= List of stadiums in the United Kingdom by capacity =

The following is a list of stadiums in the United Kingdom, ranked in order of capacity, with the minimum capacity being 5,000. Capacities are standard total capacity, including seats and any standing areas, and excluding any temporary seating. Most are used for association football (referred to as football hereafter), with others hosting rugby union, rugby league, cricket, athletics, Gaelic football, hurling, camogie, tennis, American football, speedway and greyhound racing.

== Current stadiums ==
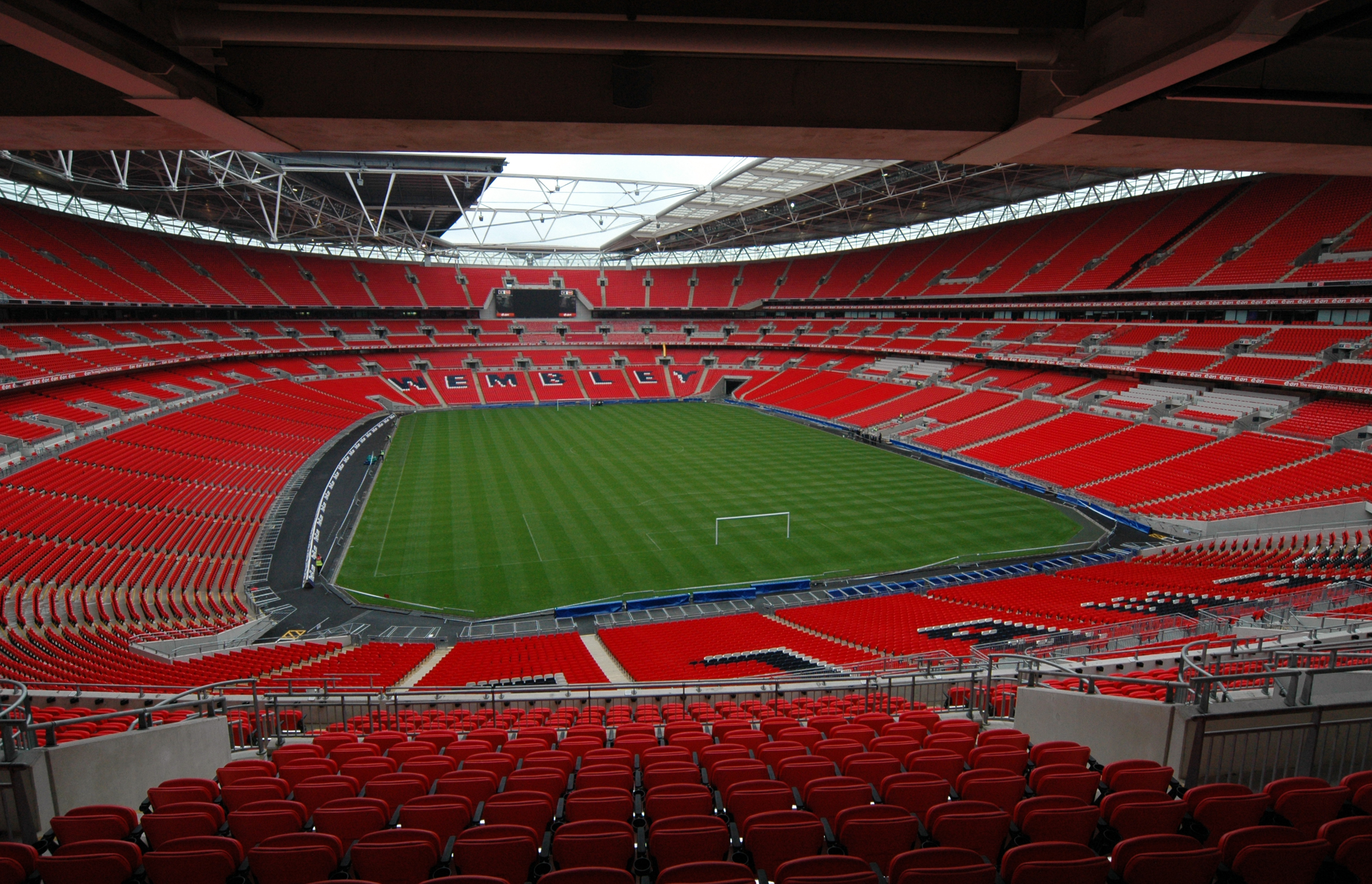
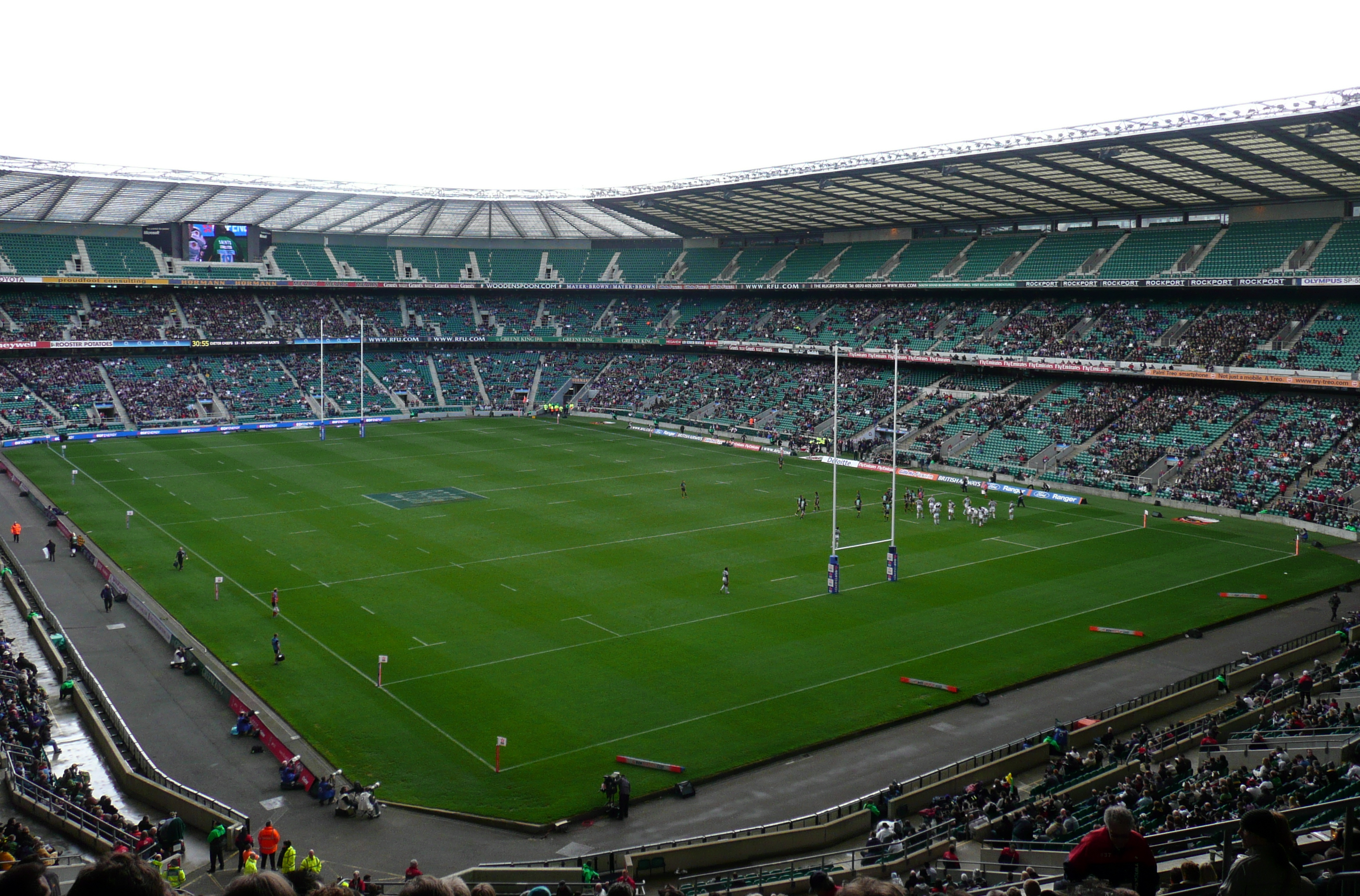
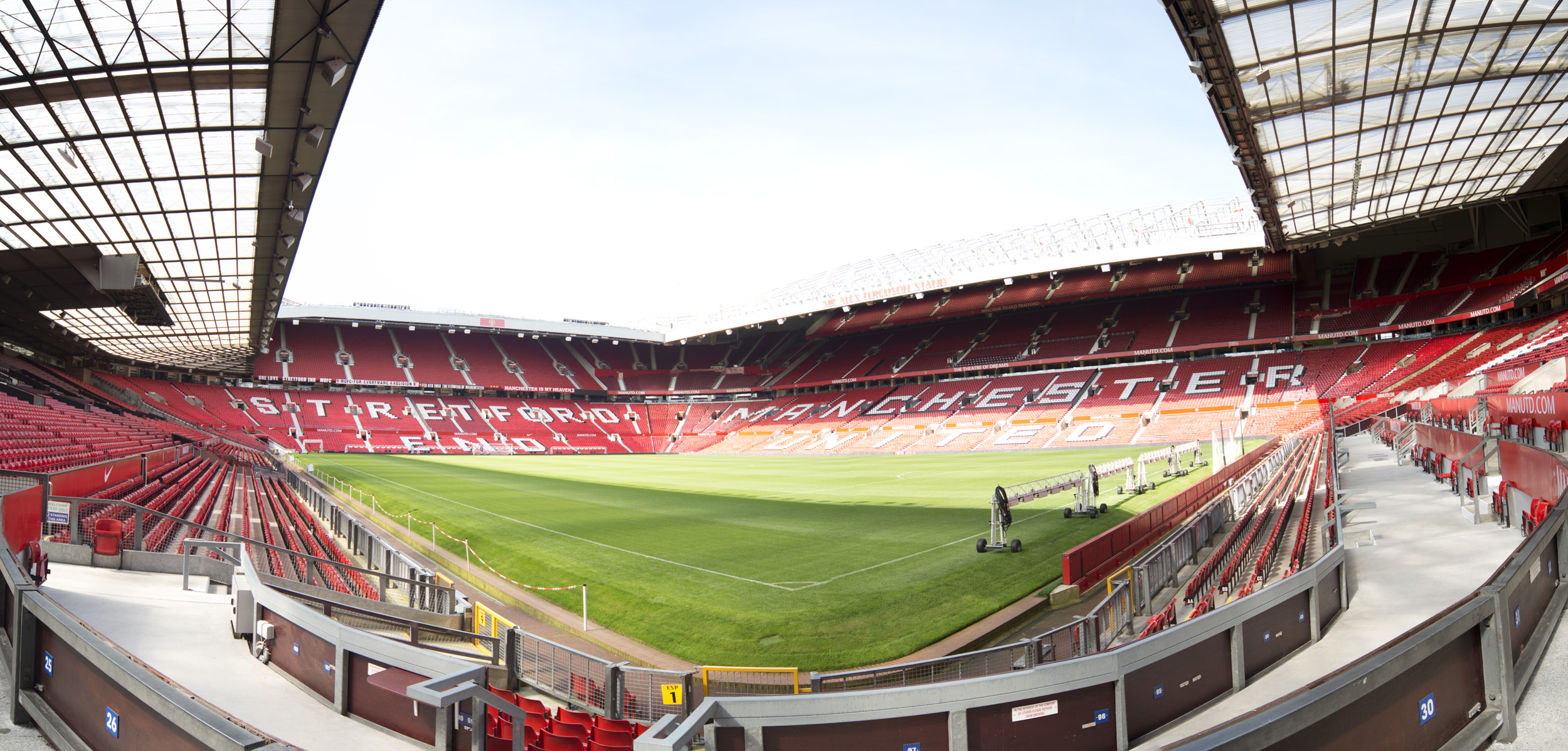
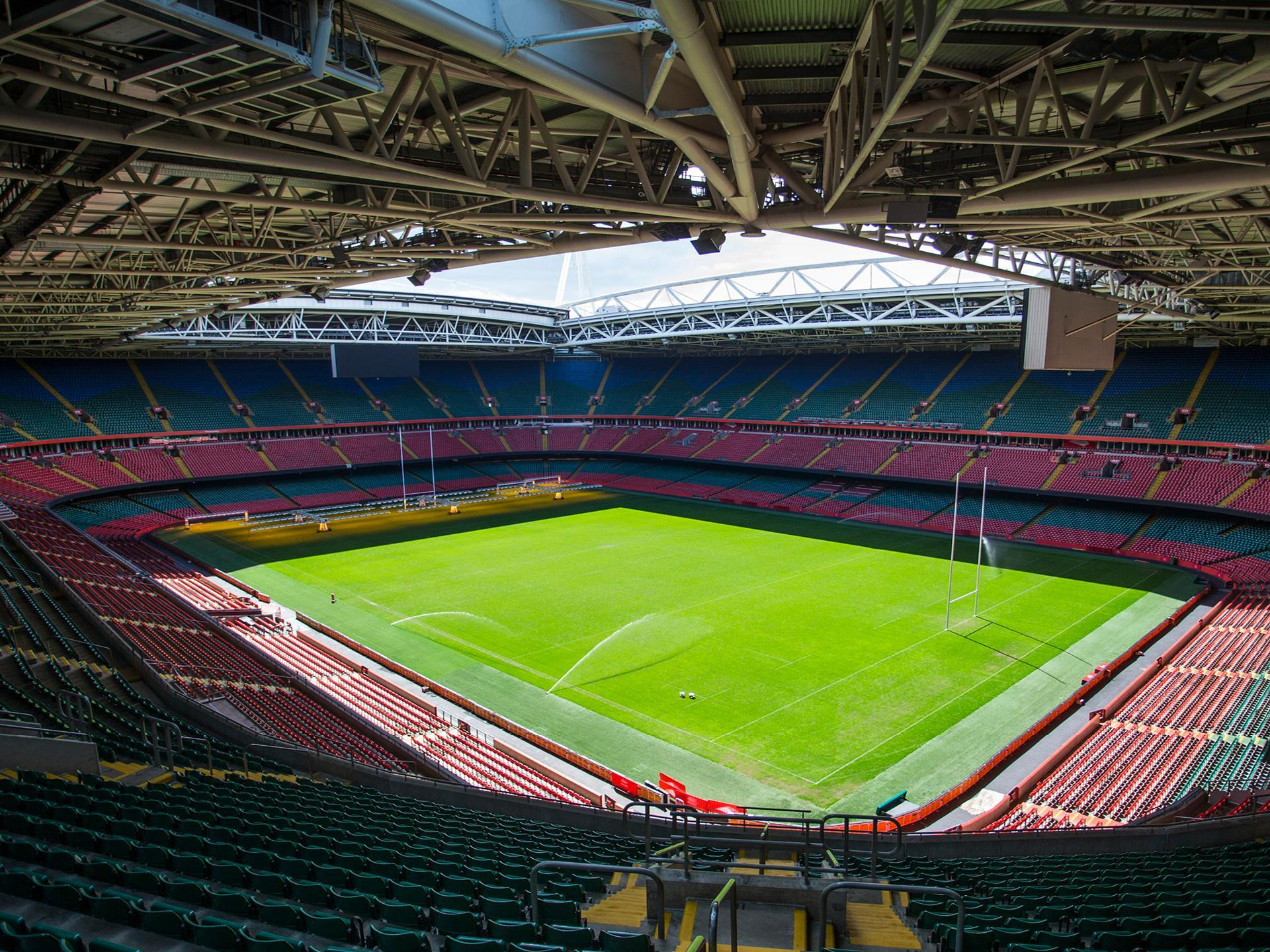
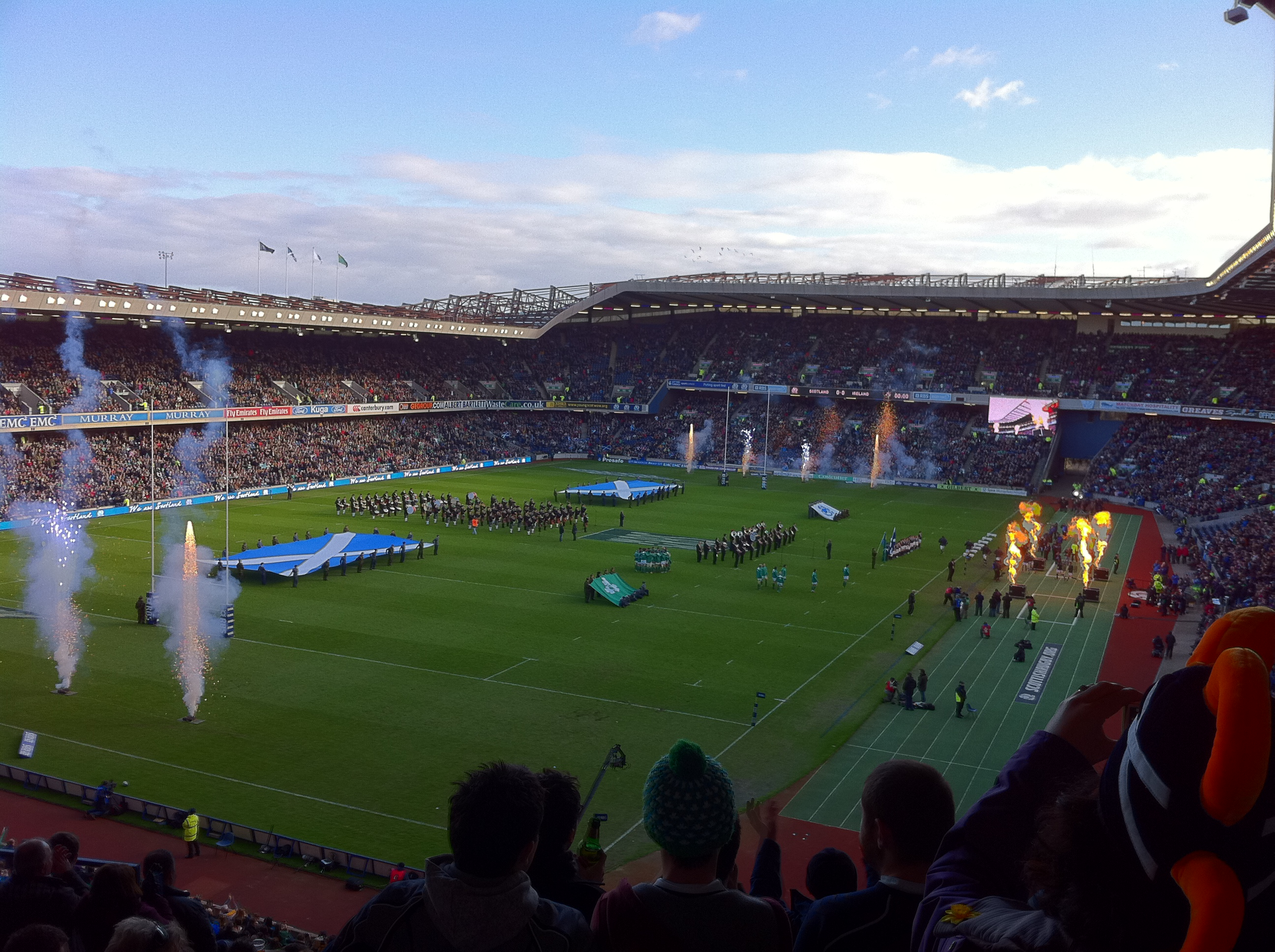
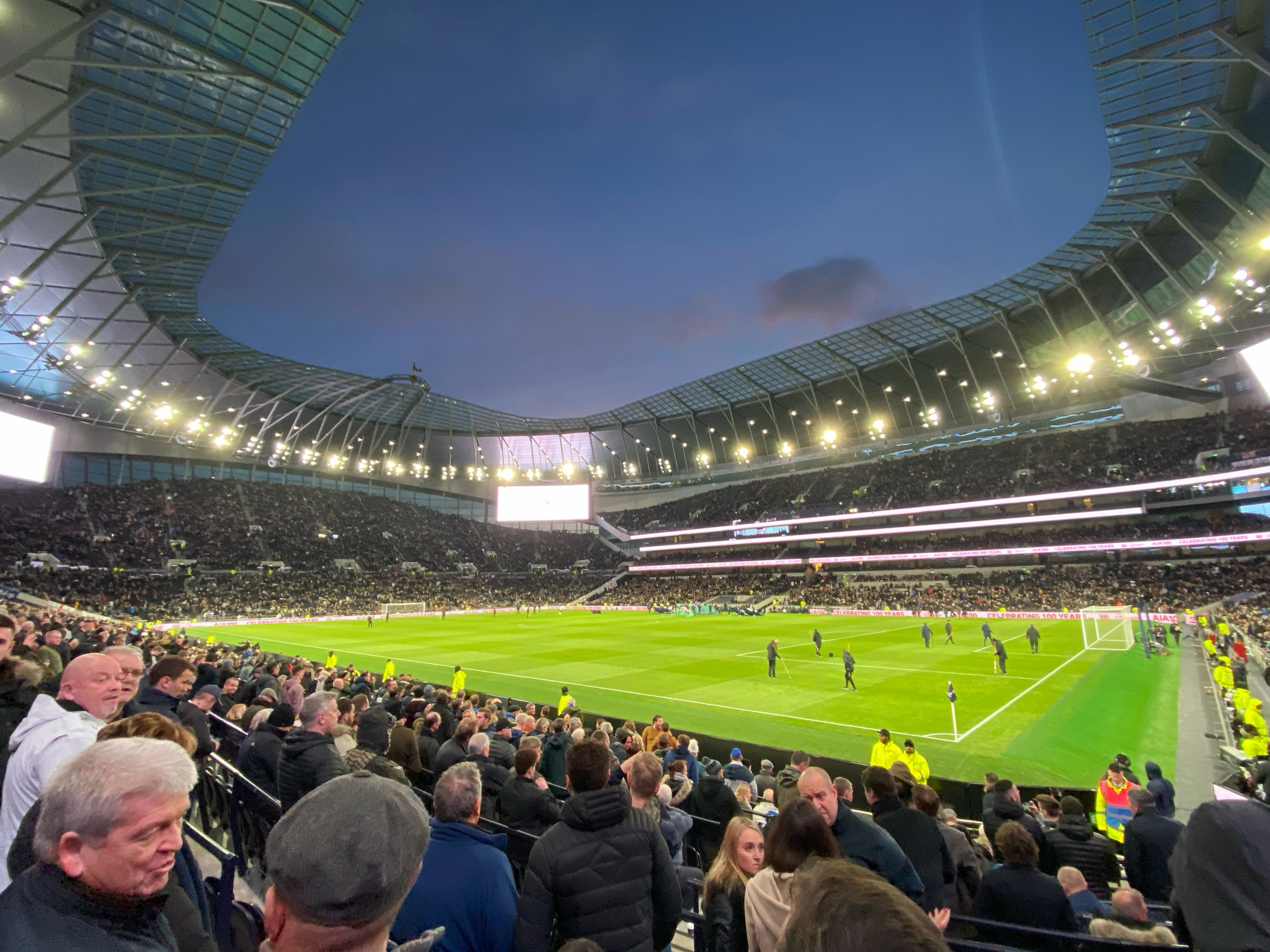
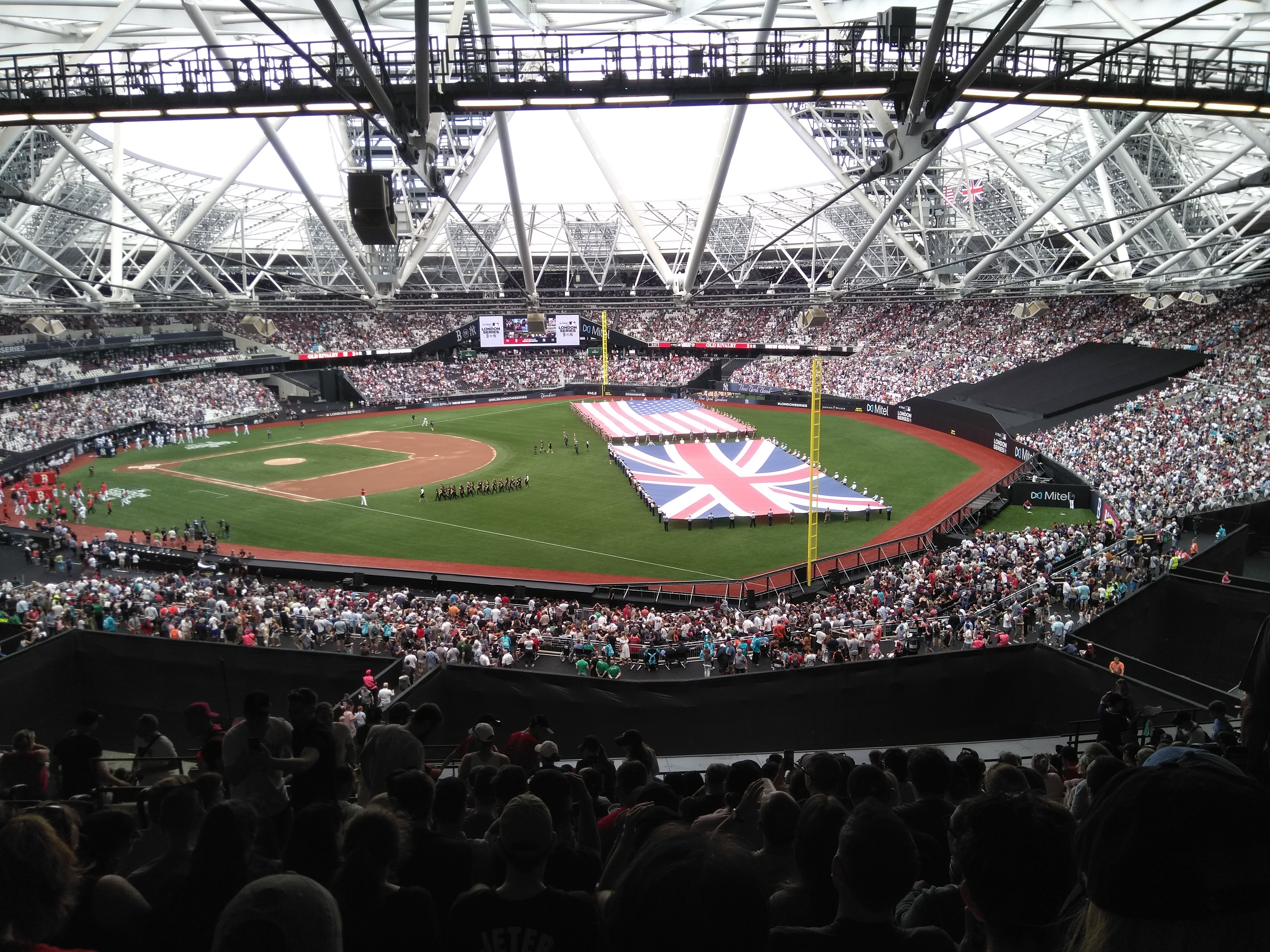
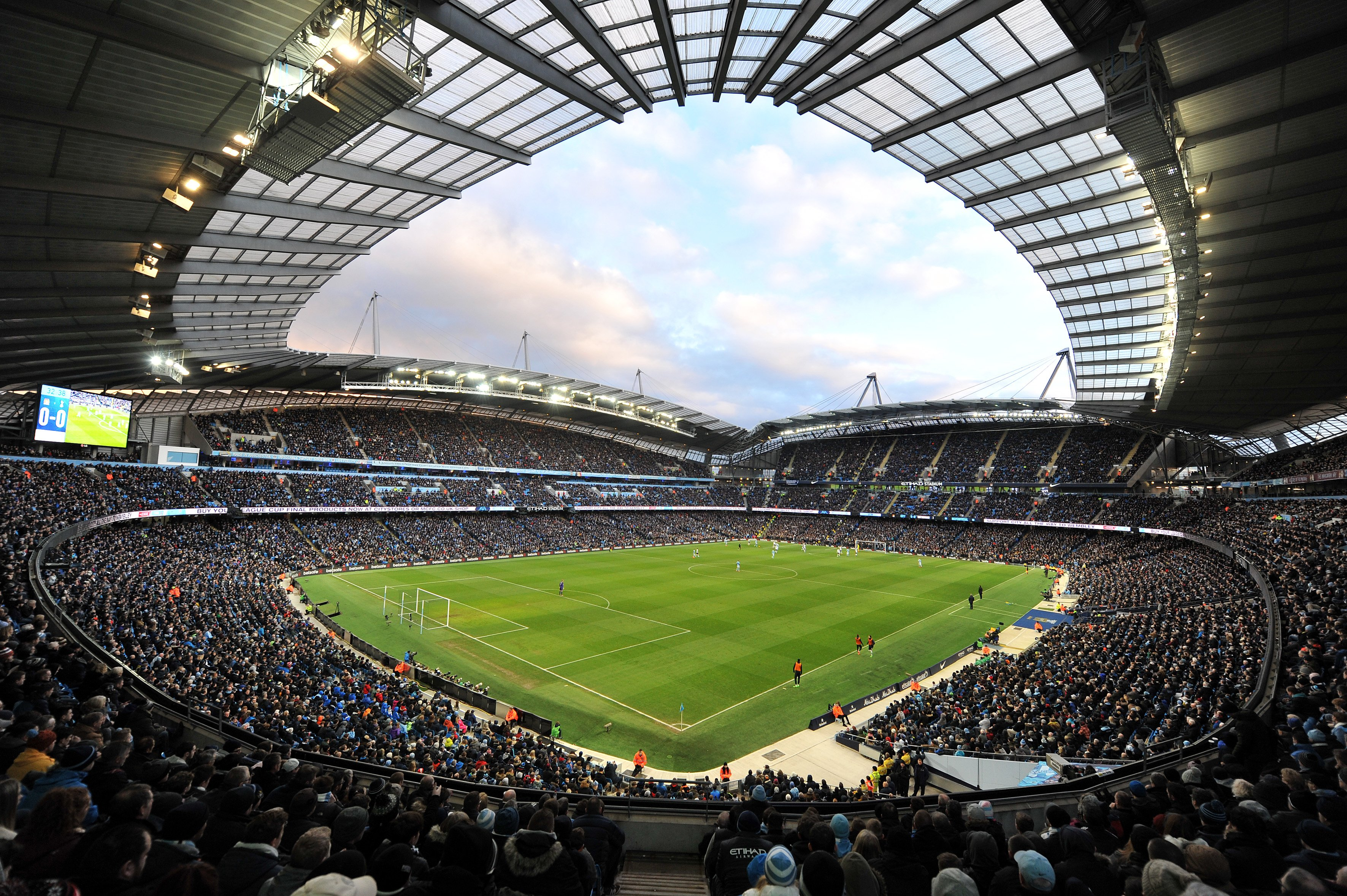
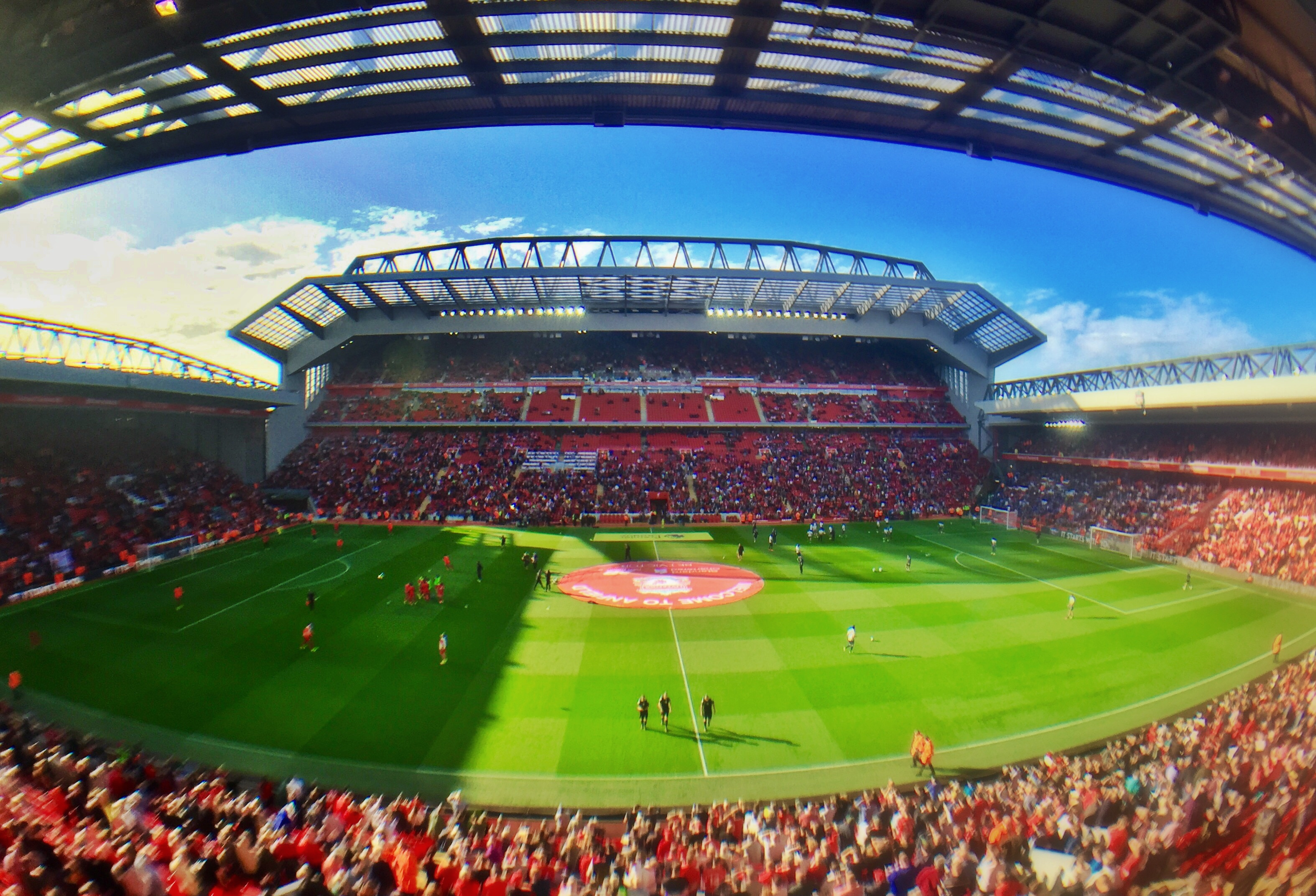
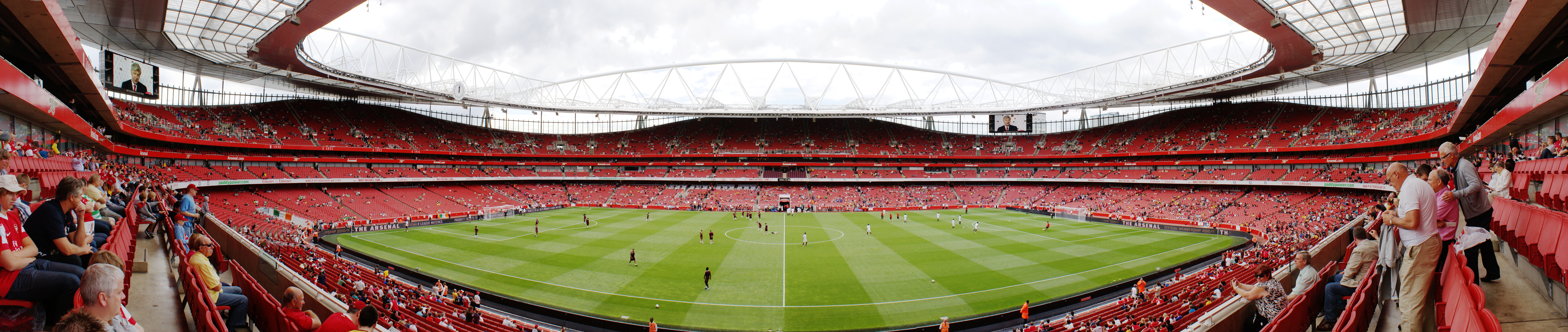
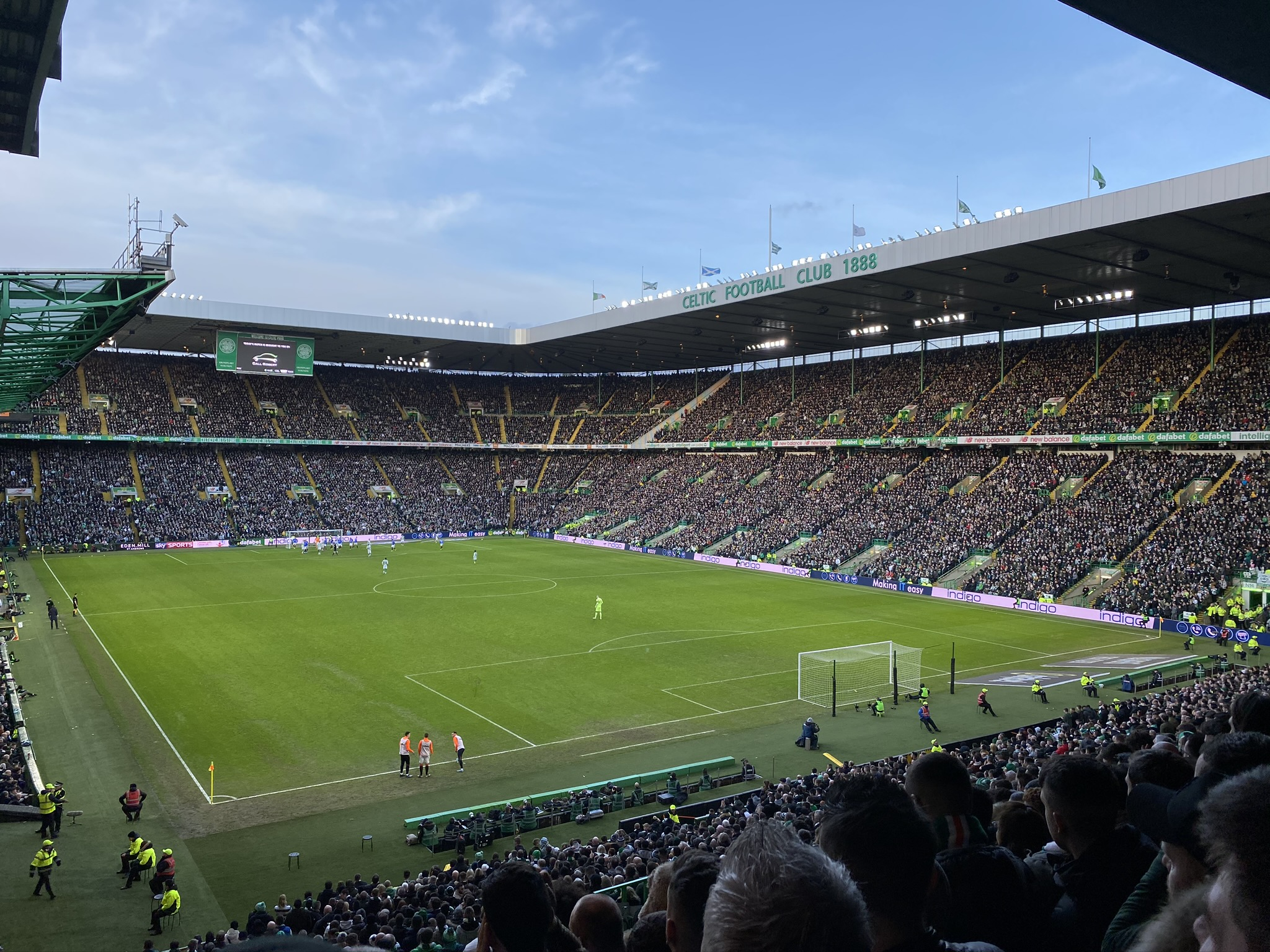
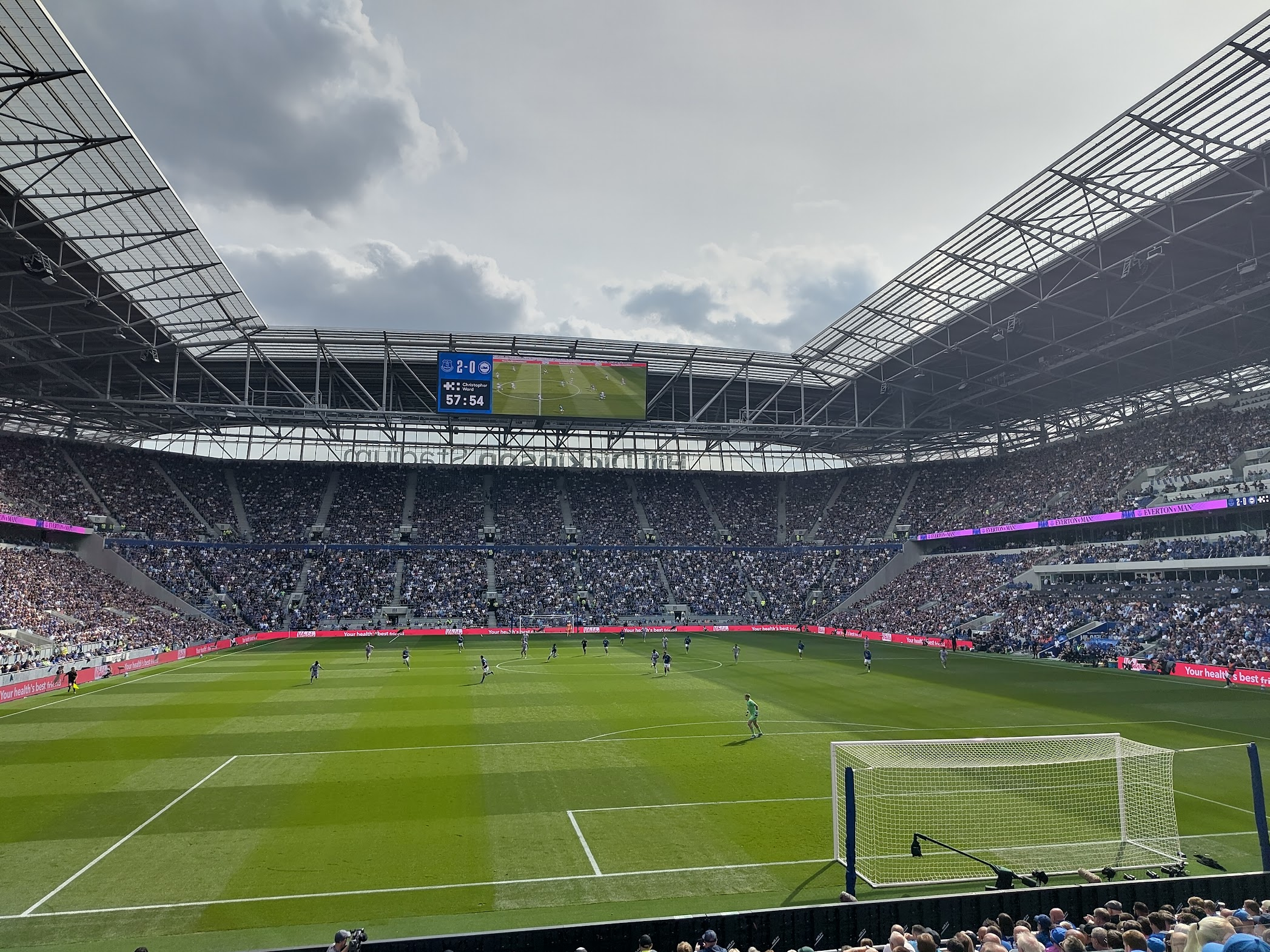
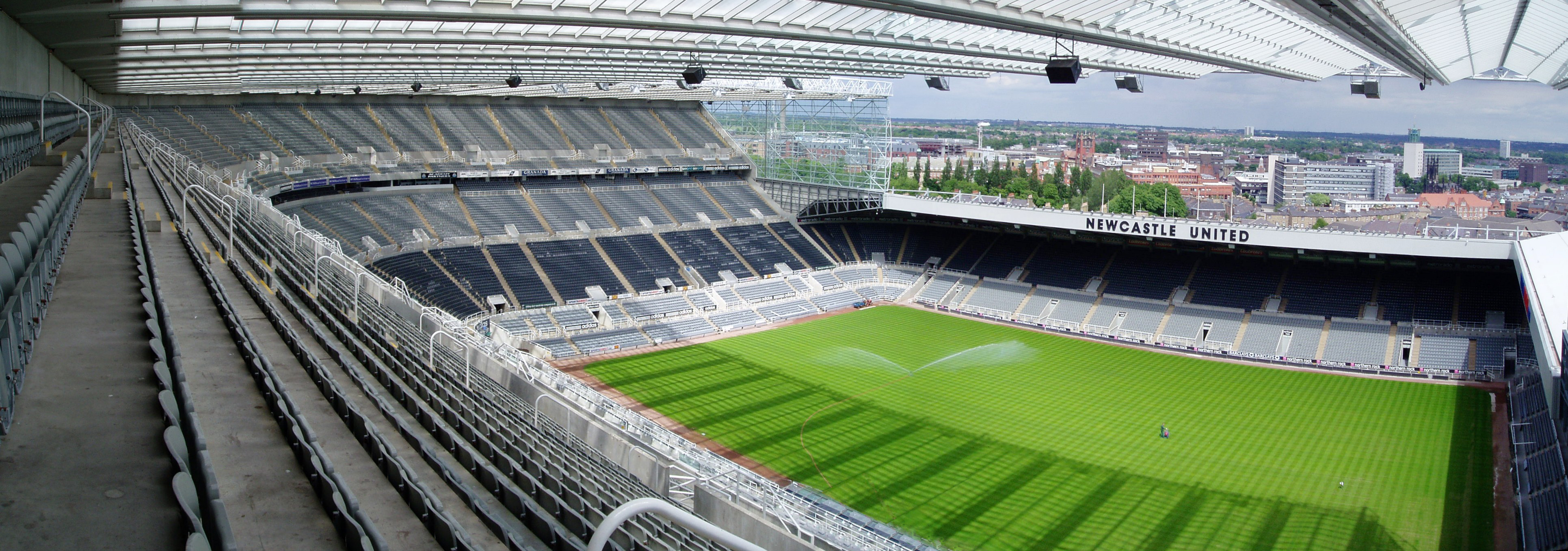
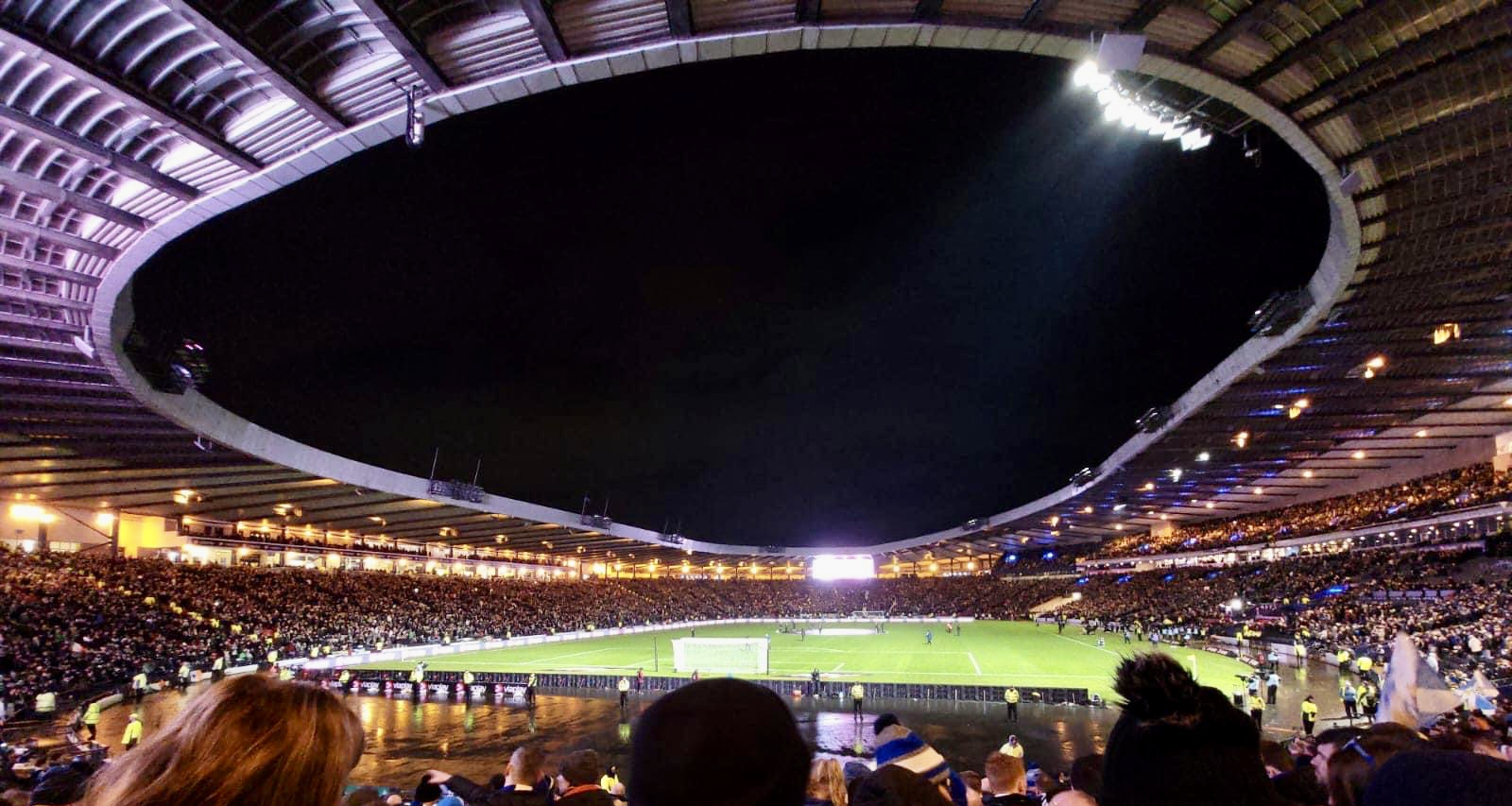
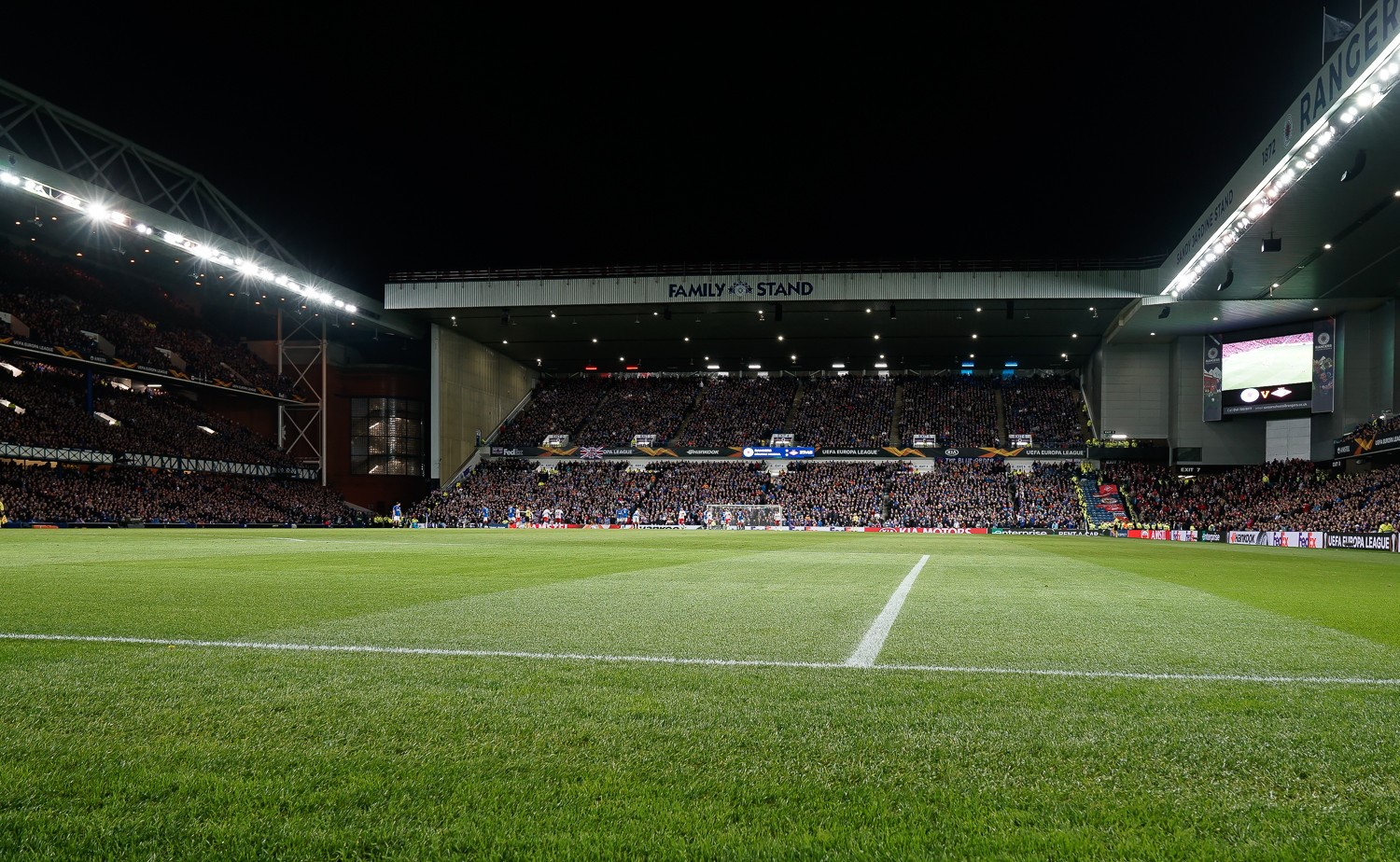
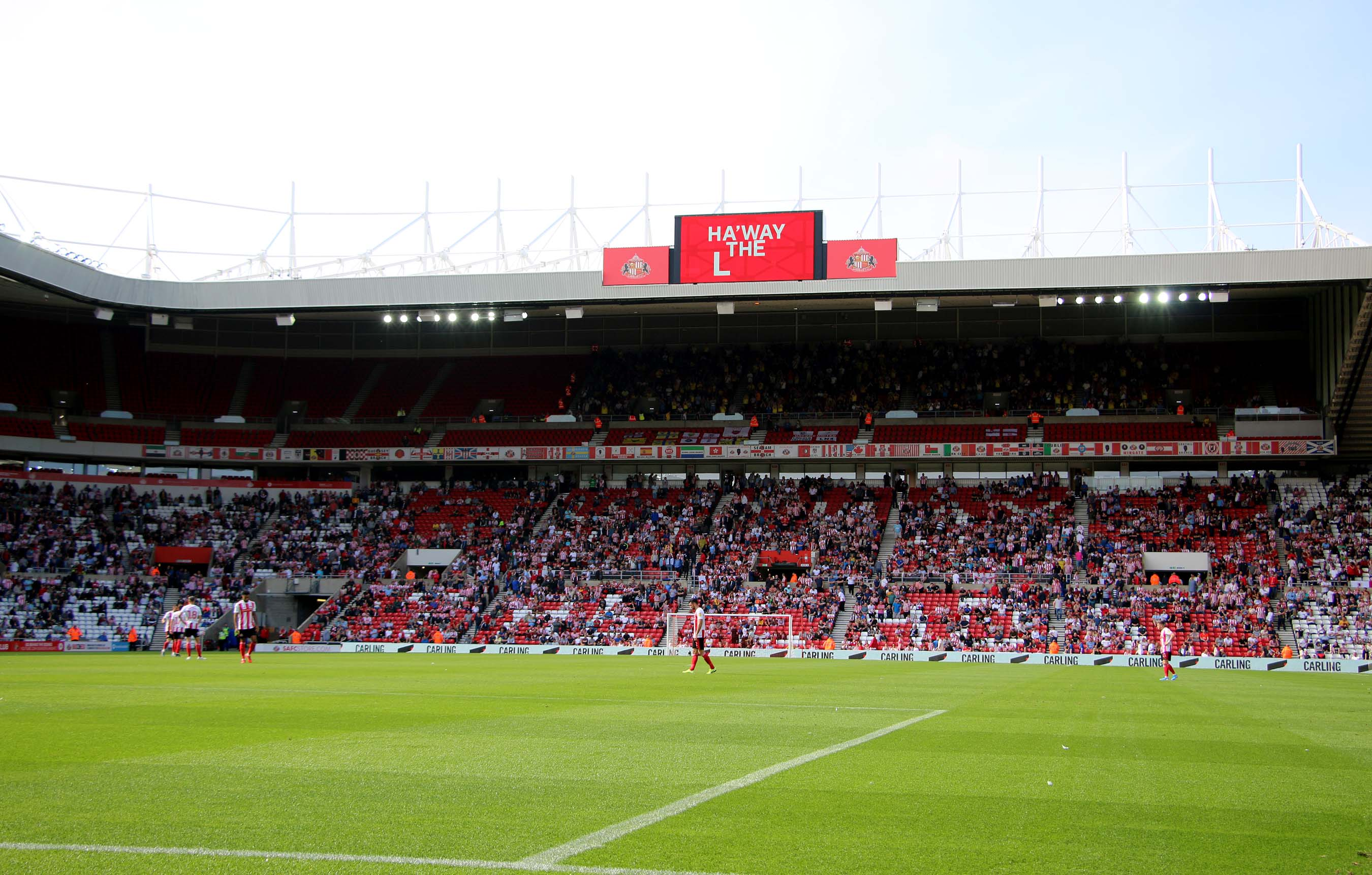
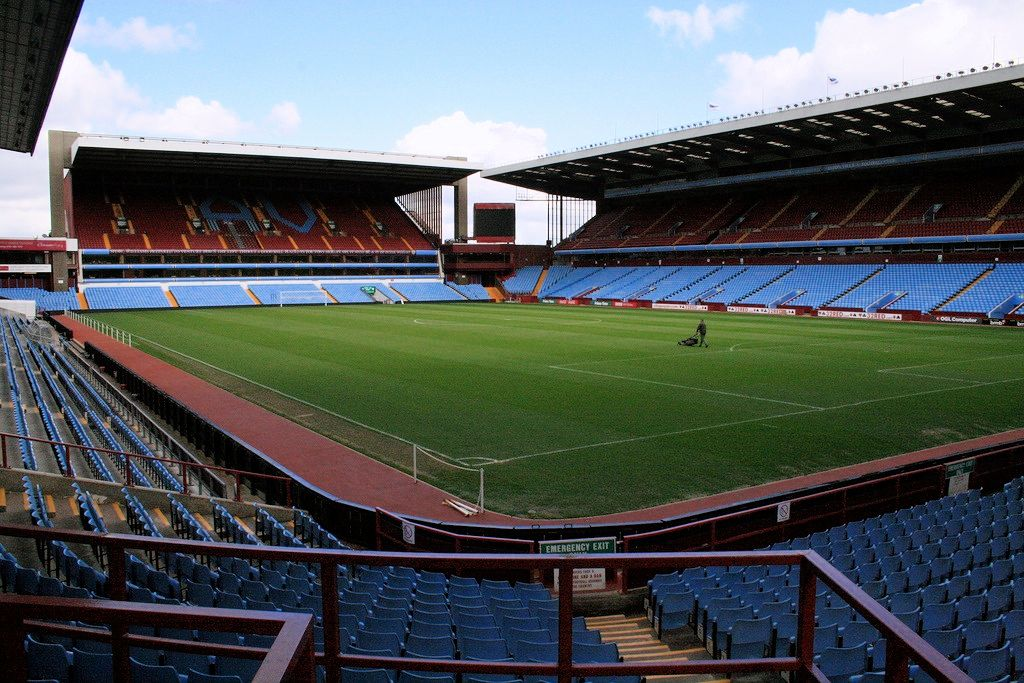
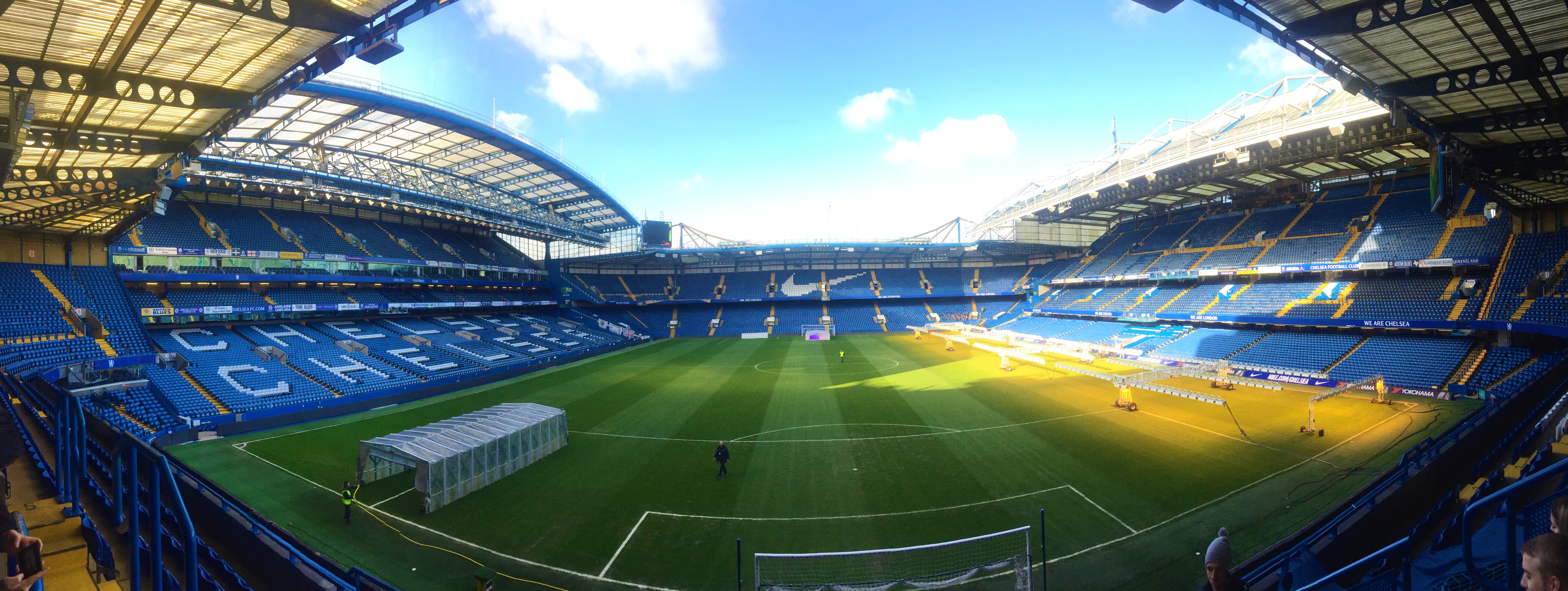
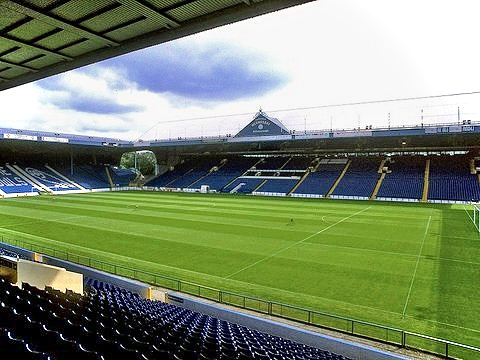
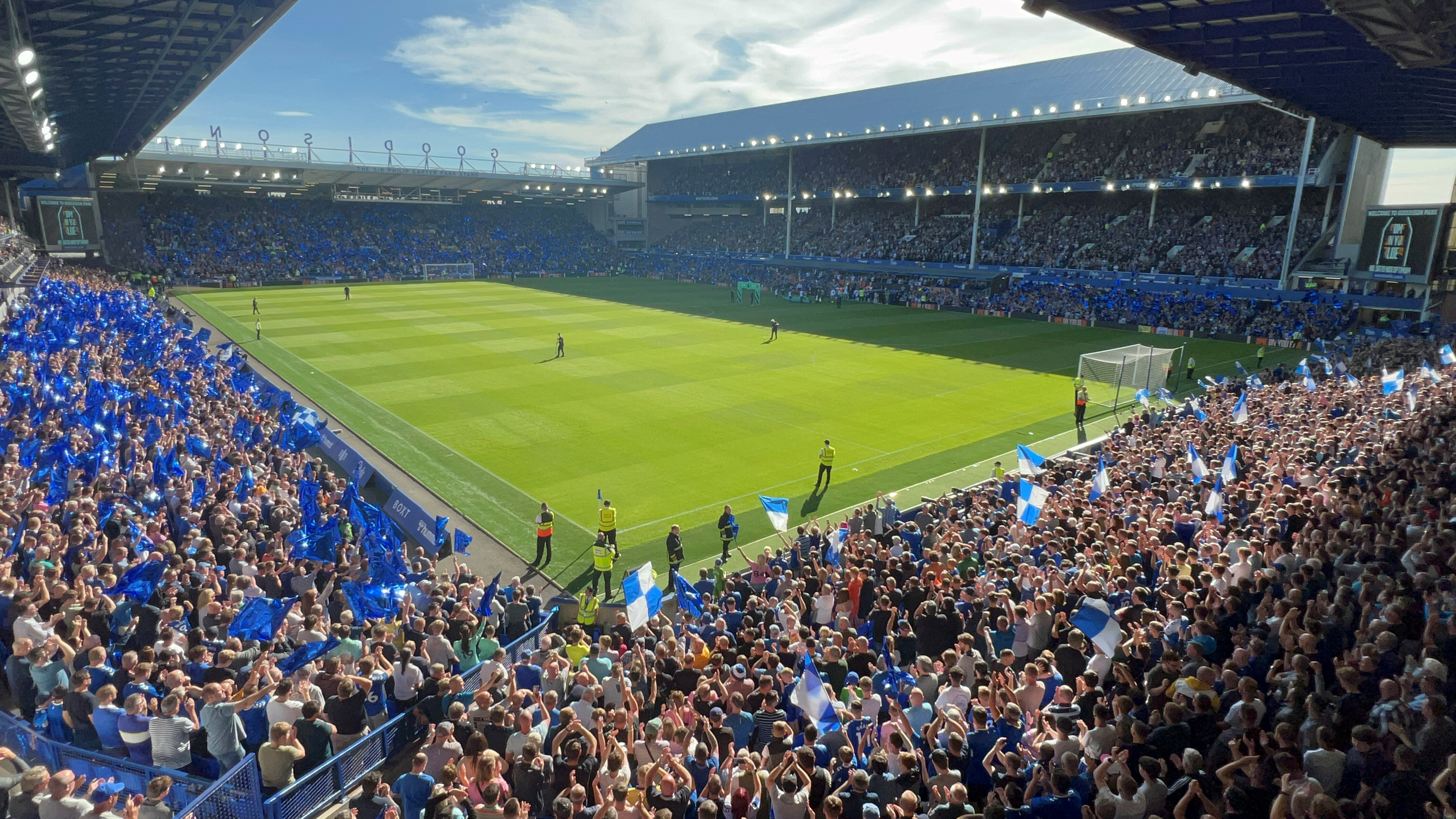
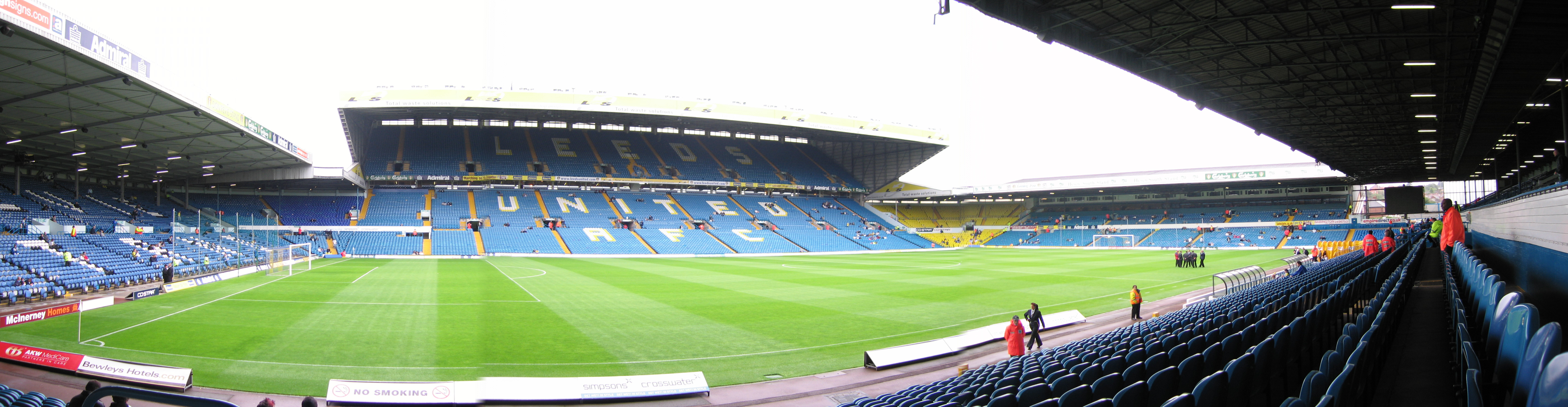
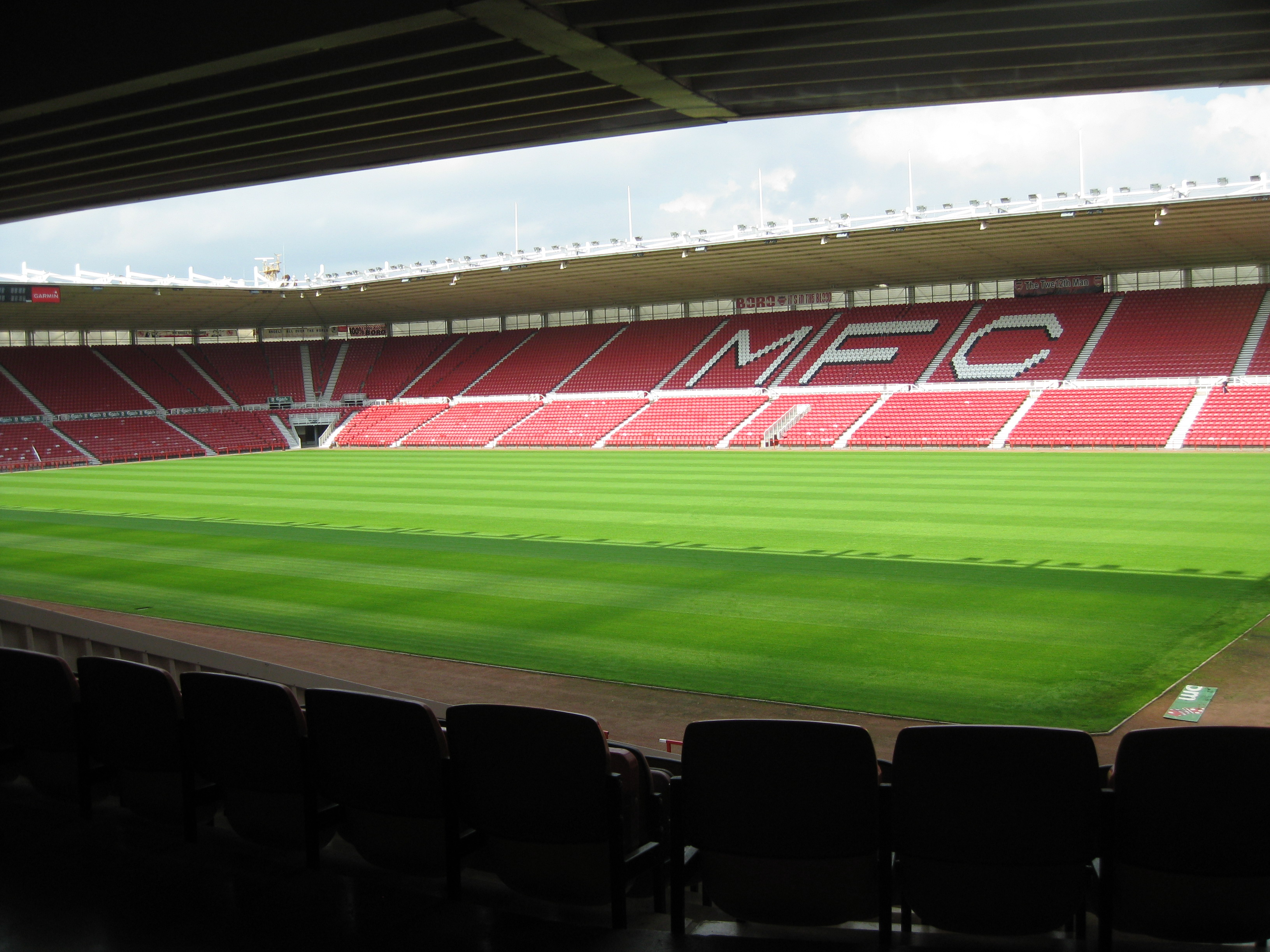
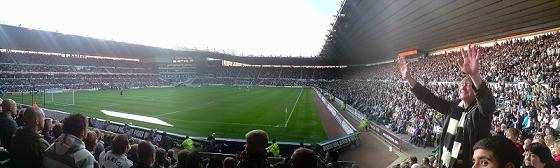
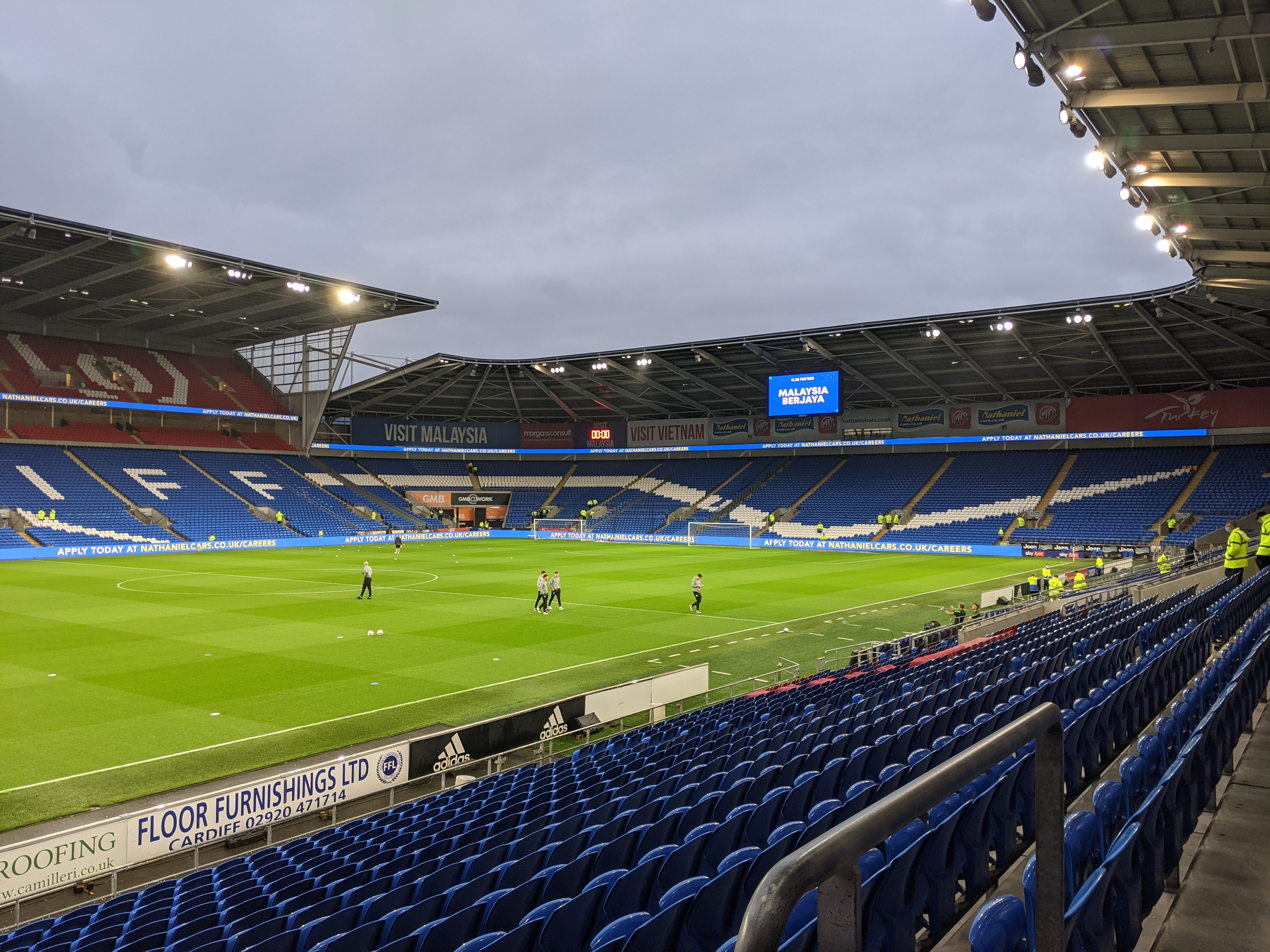
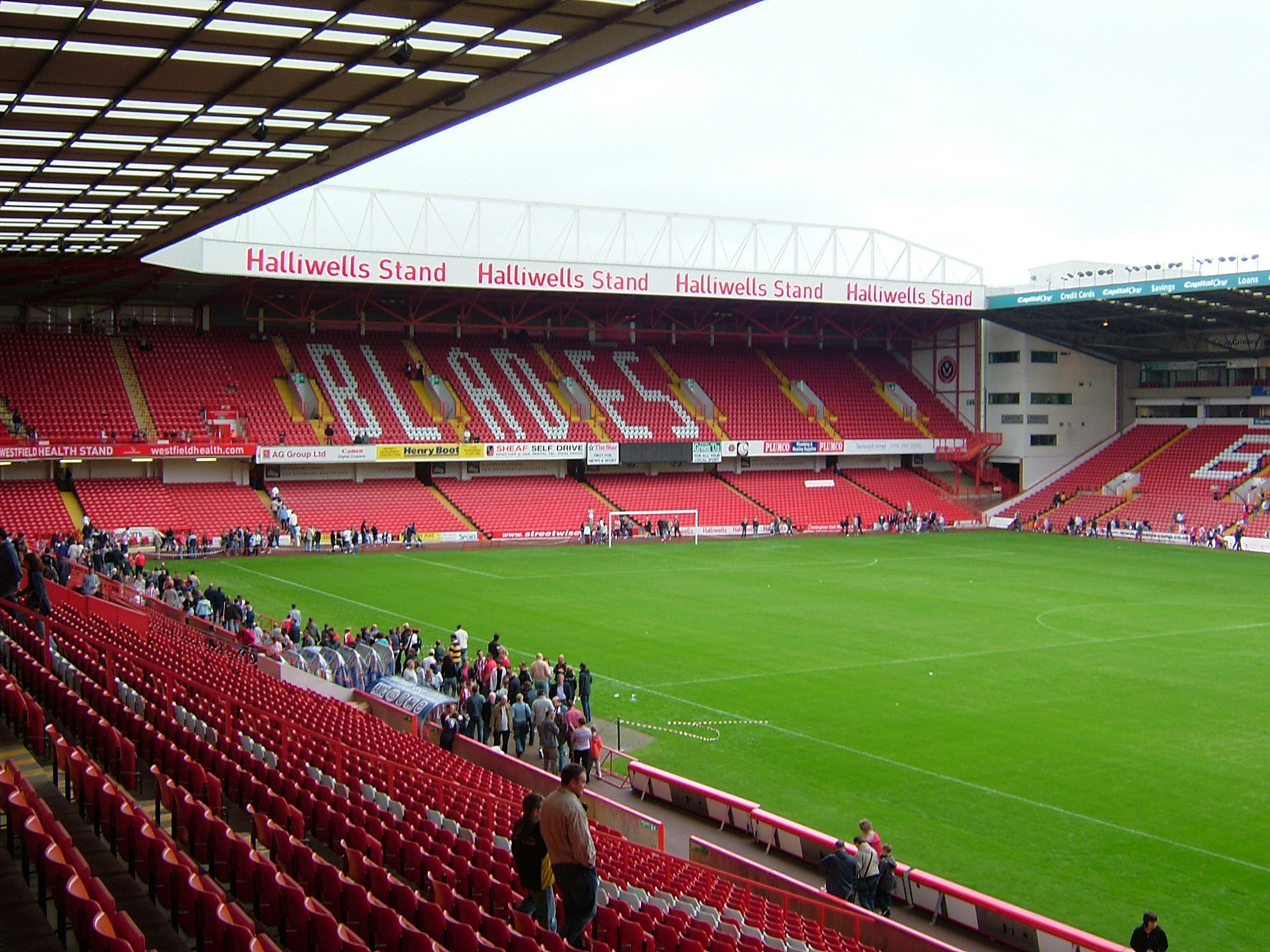
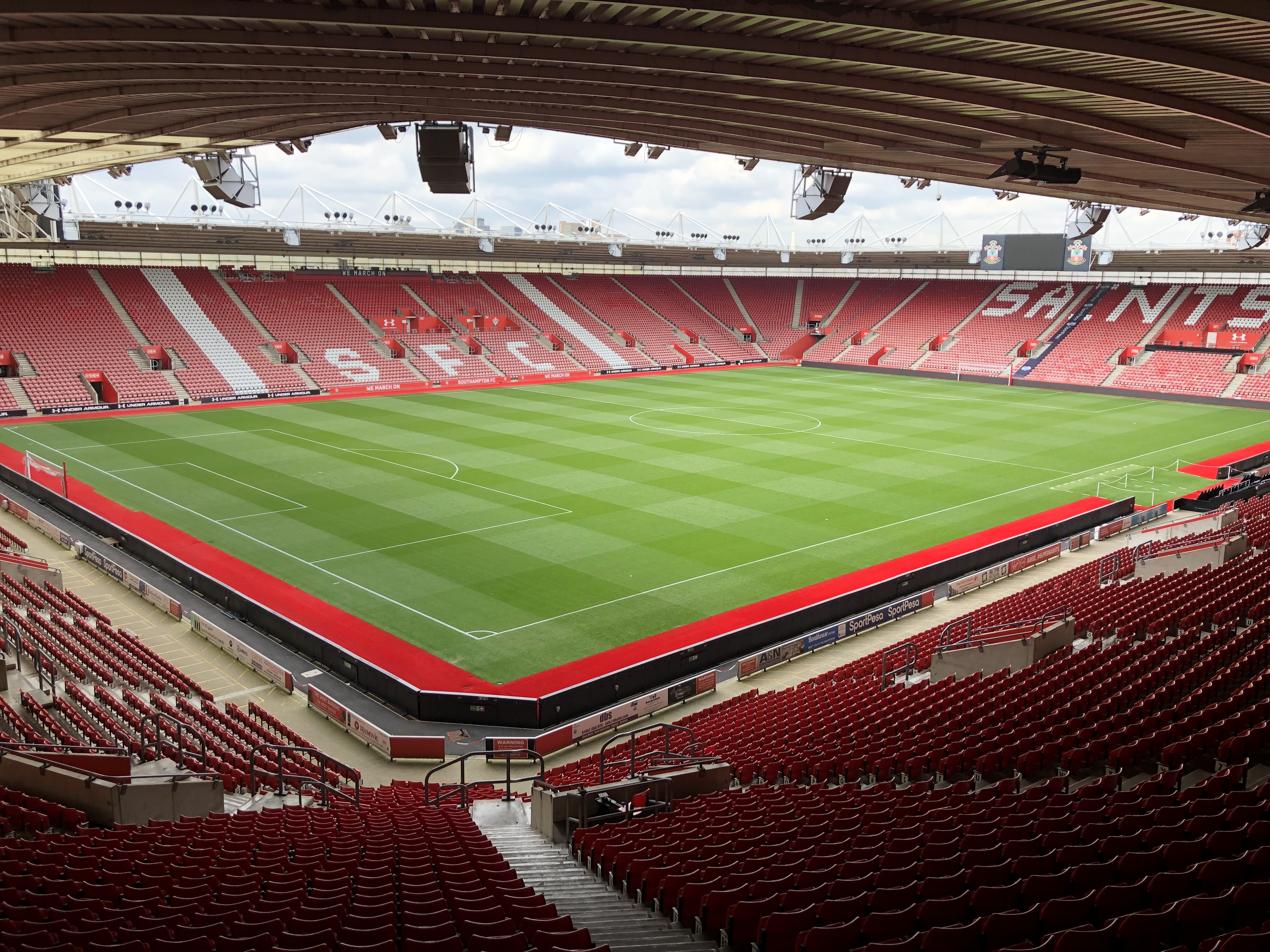
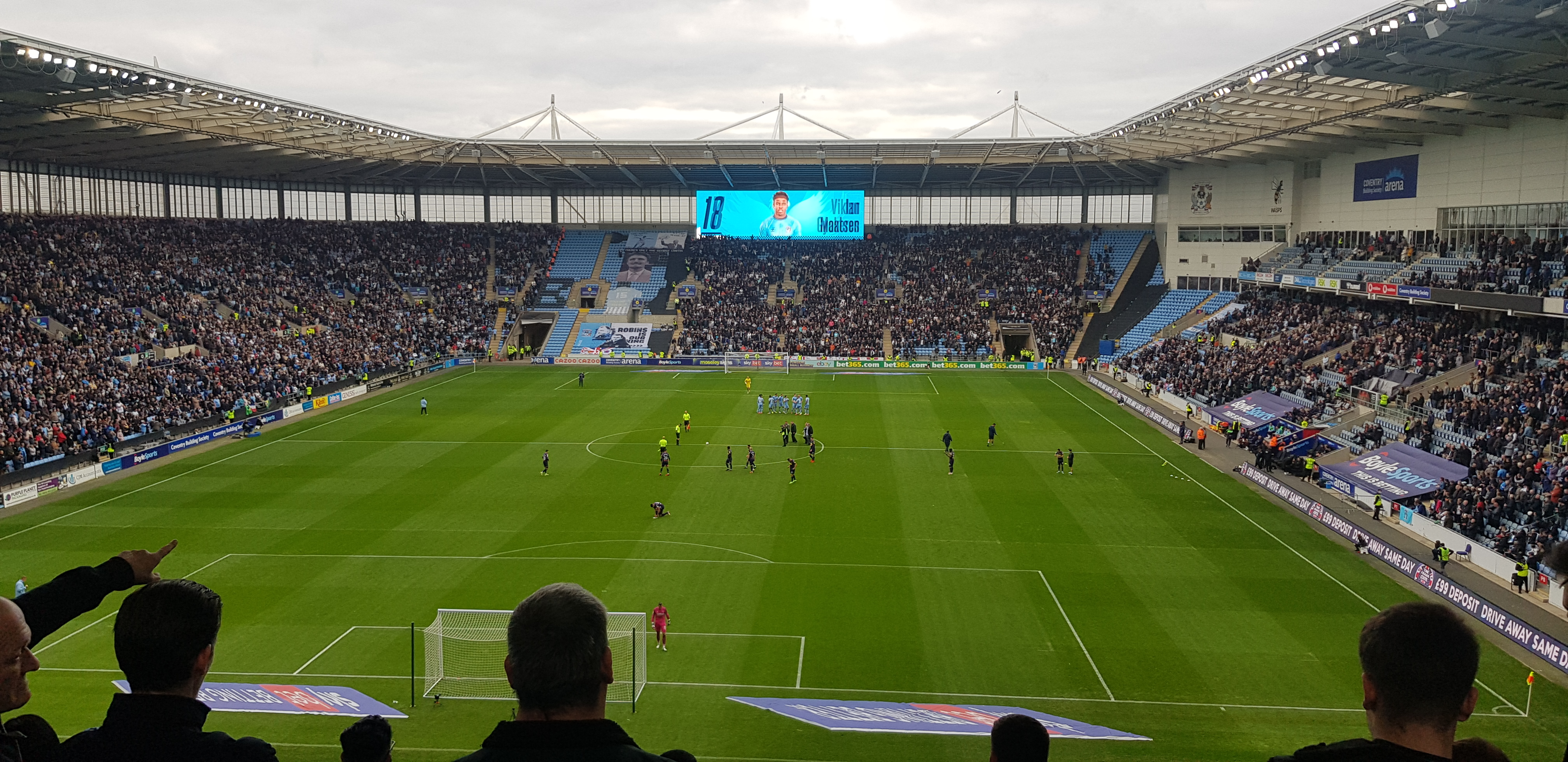
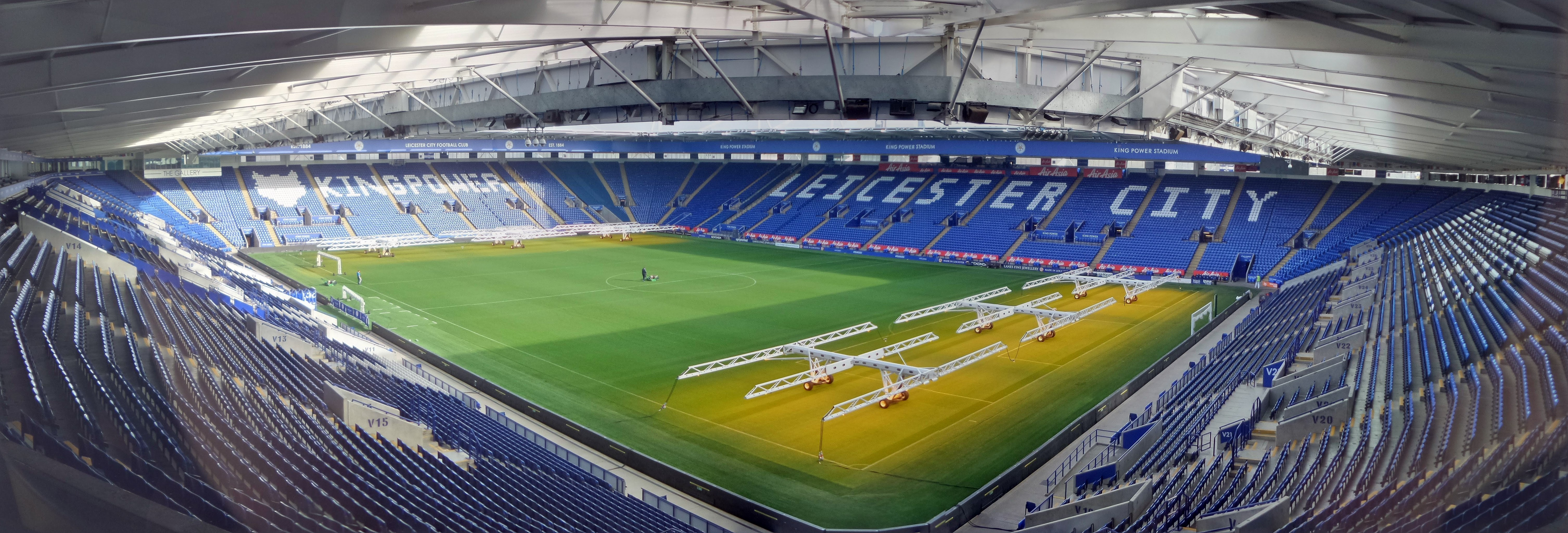
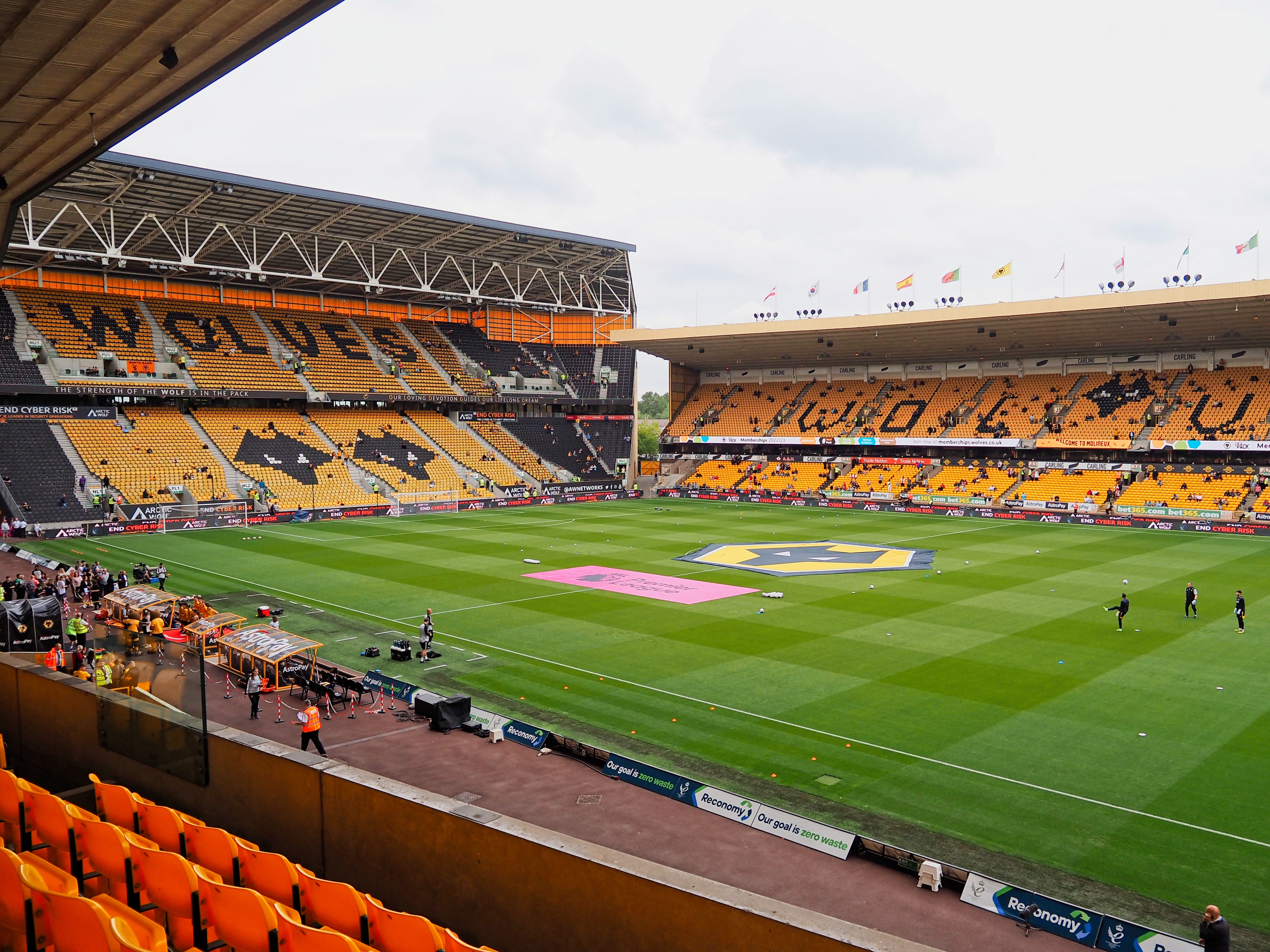
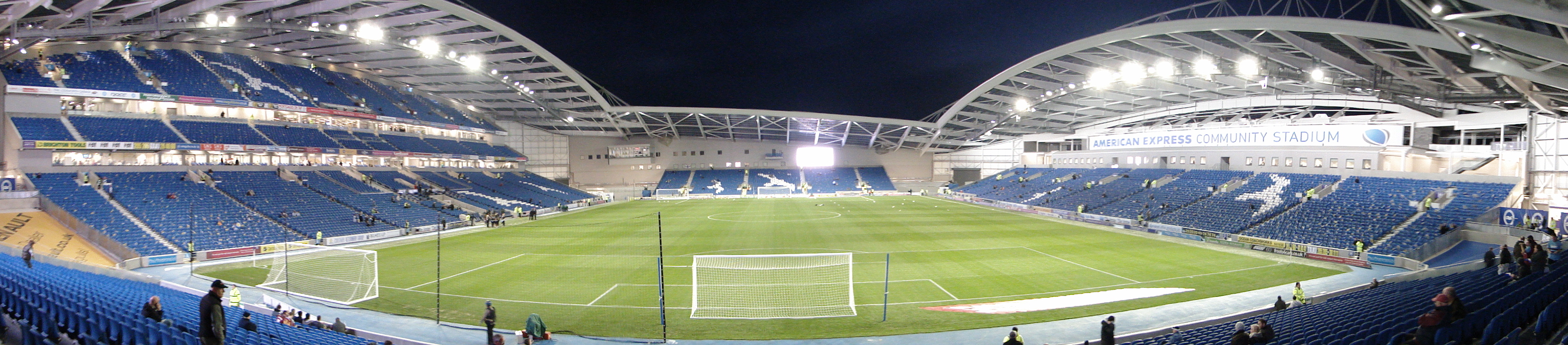
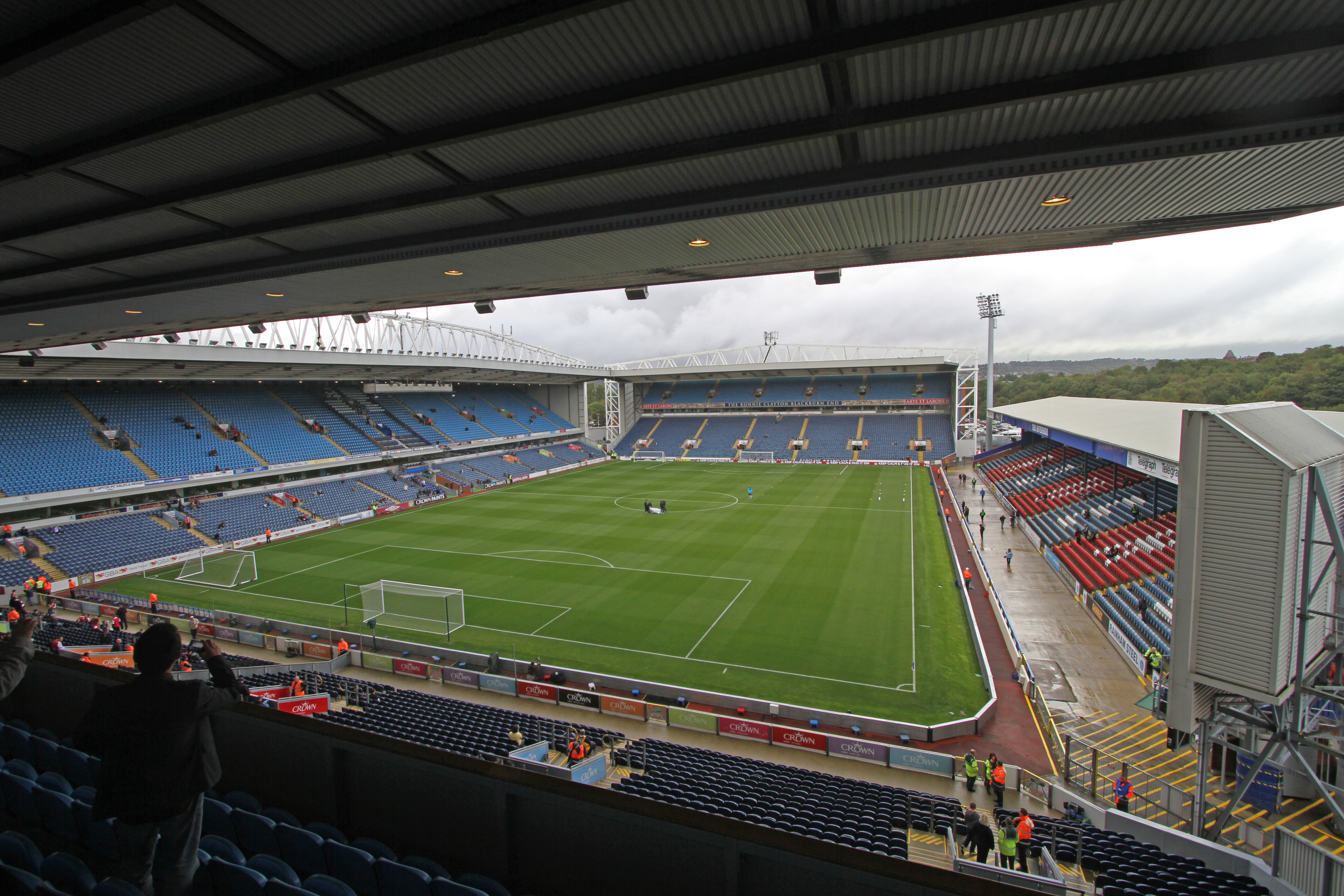
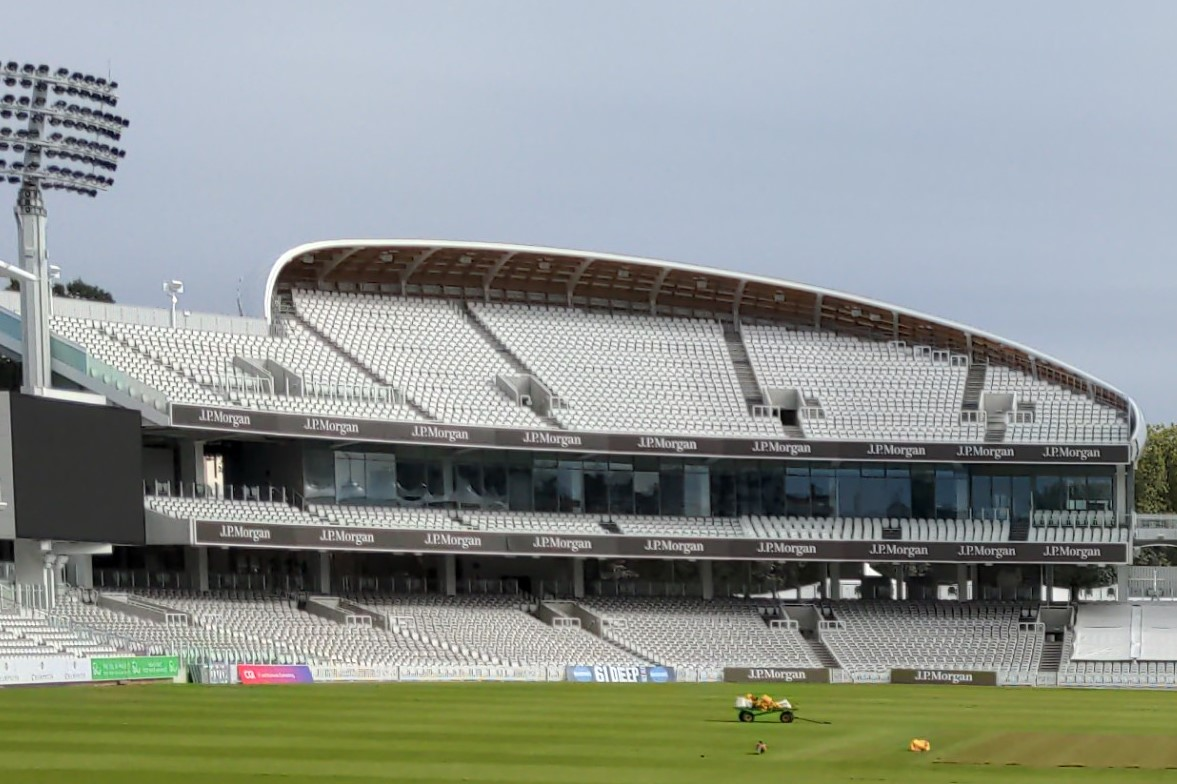
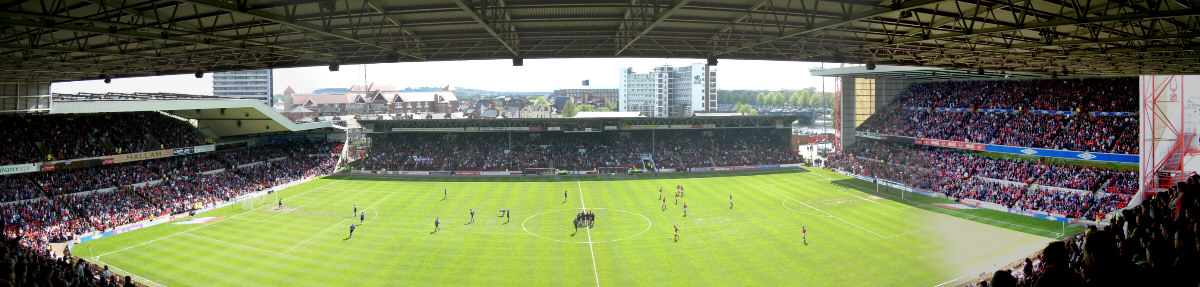
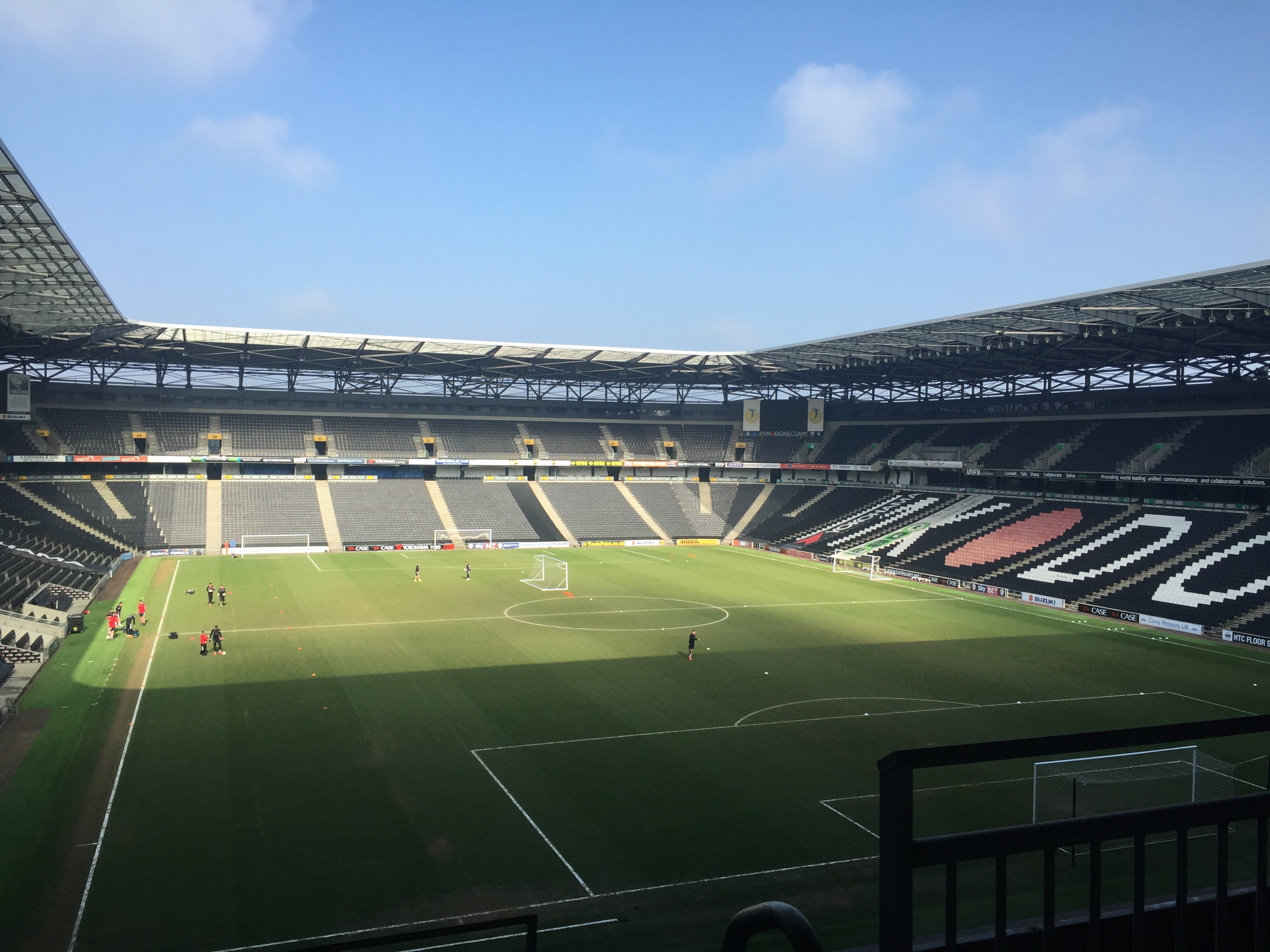
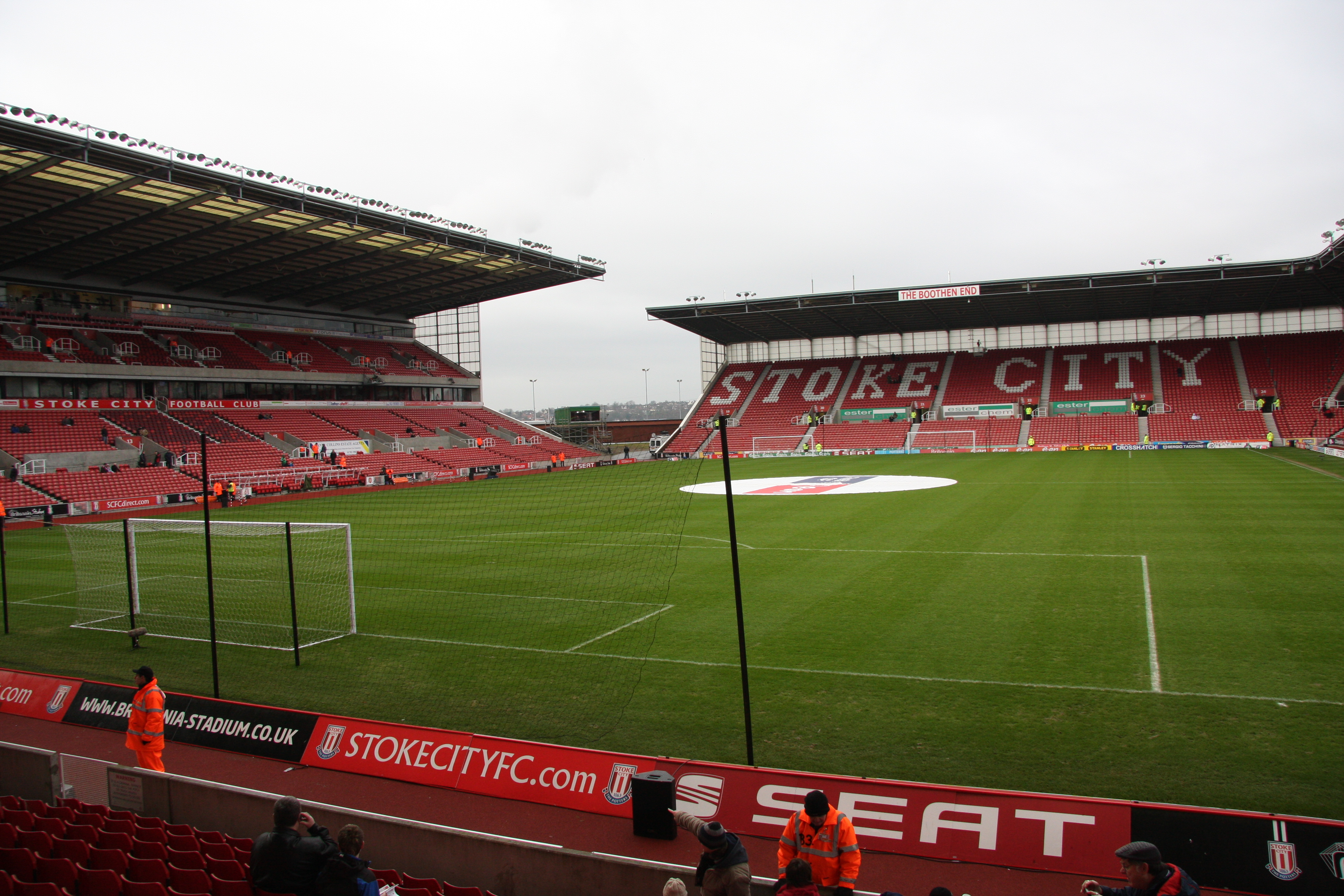
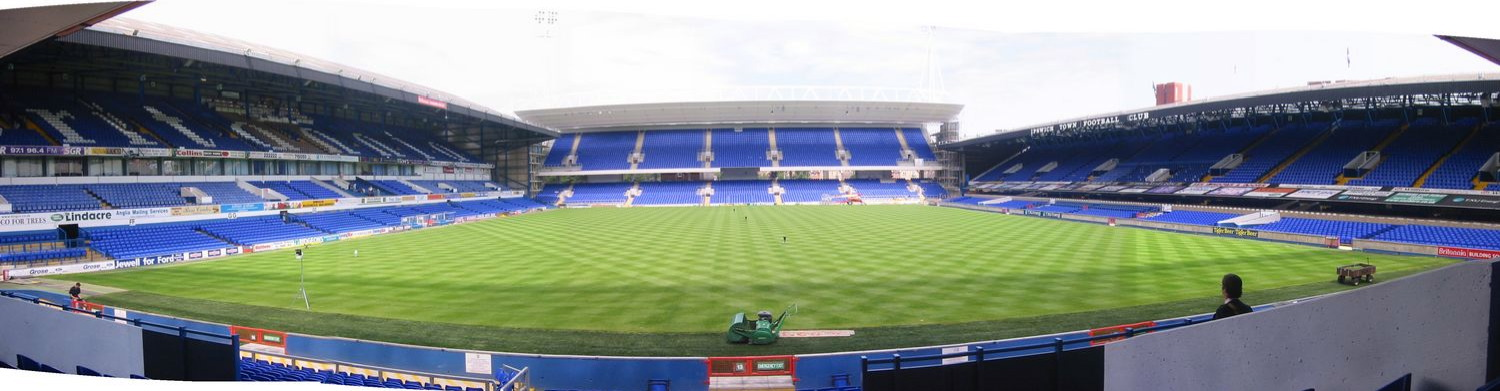
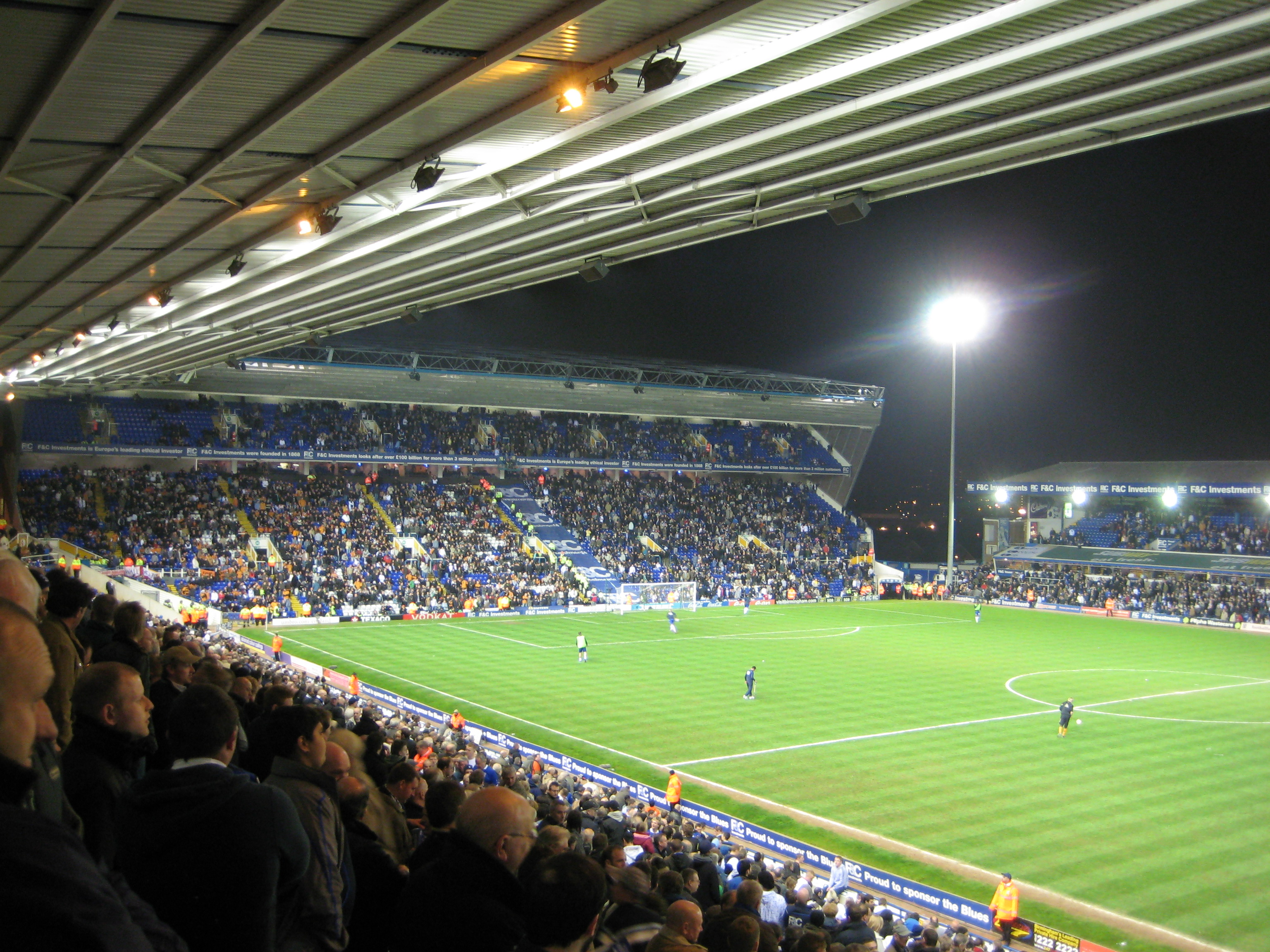
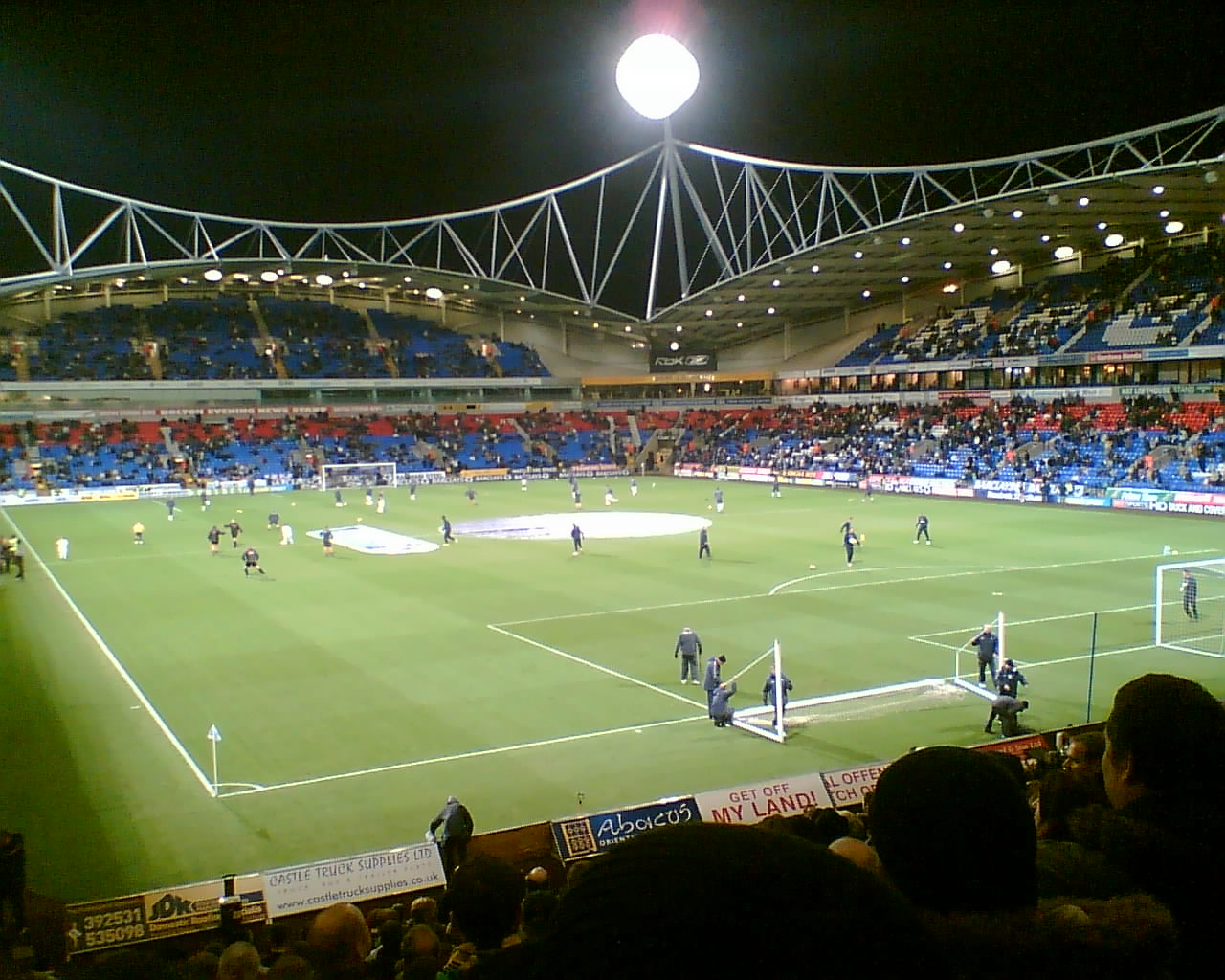
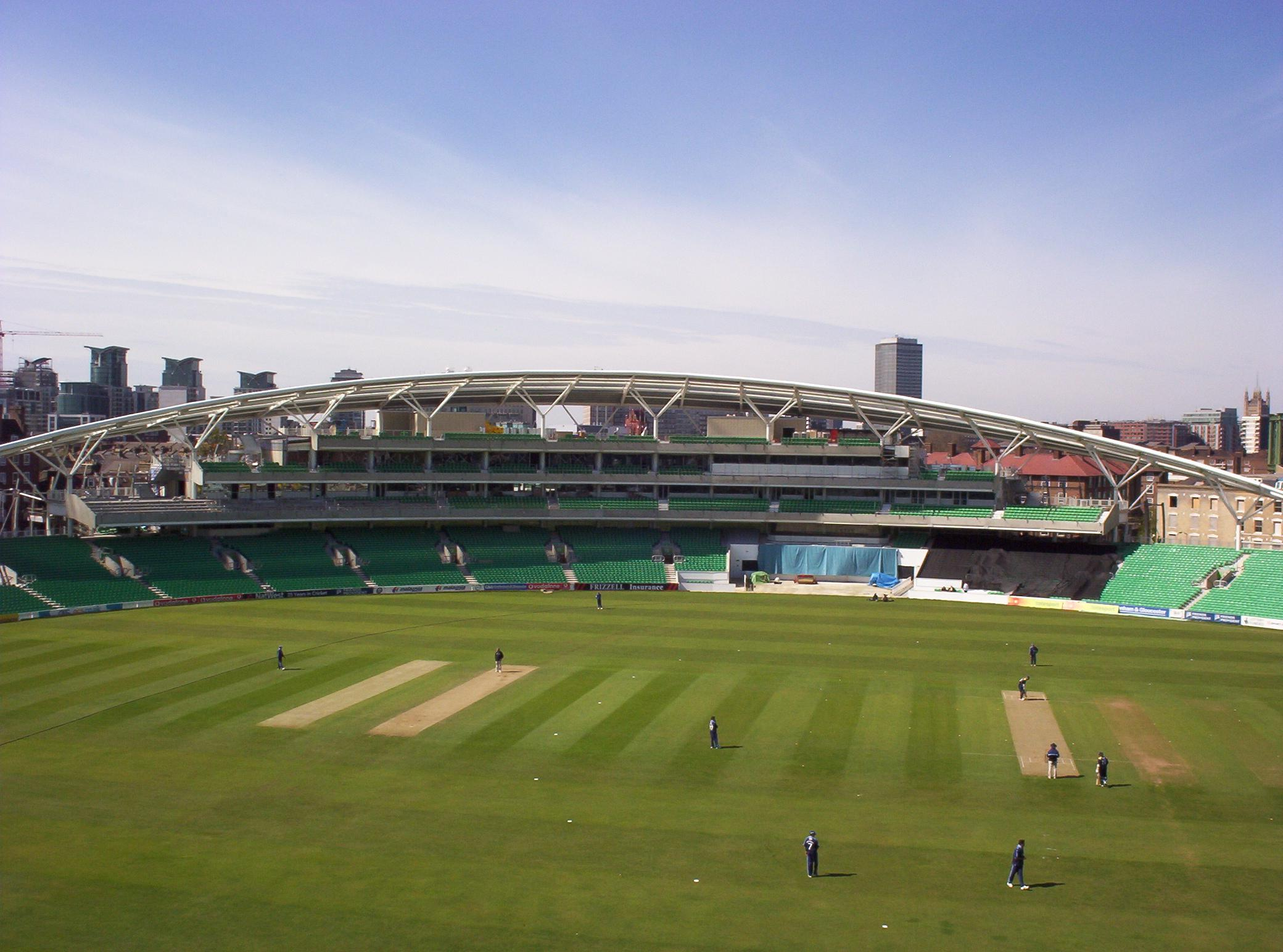
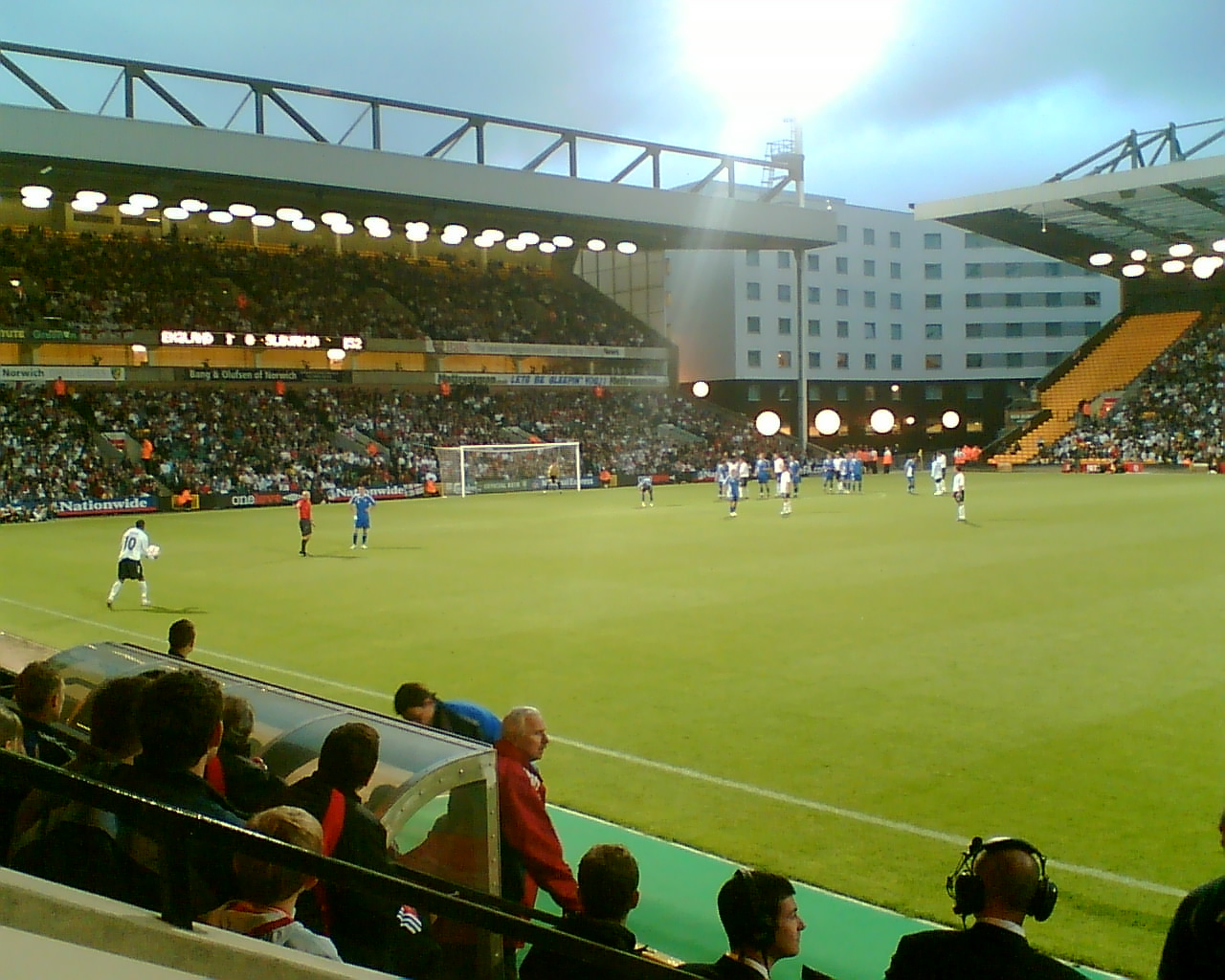
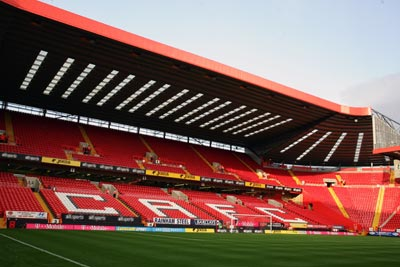
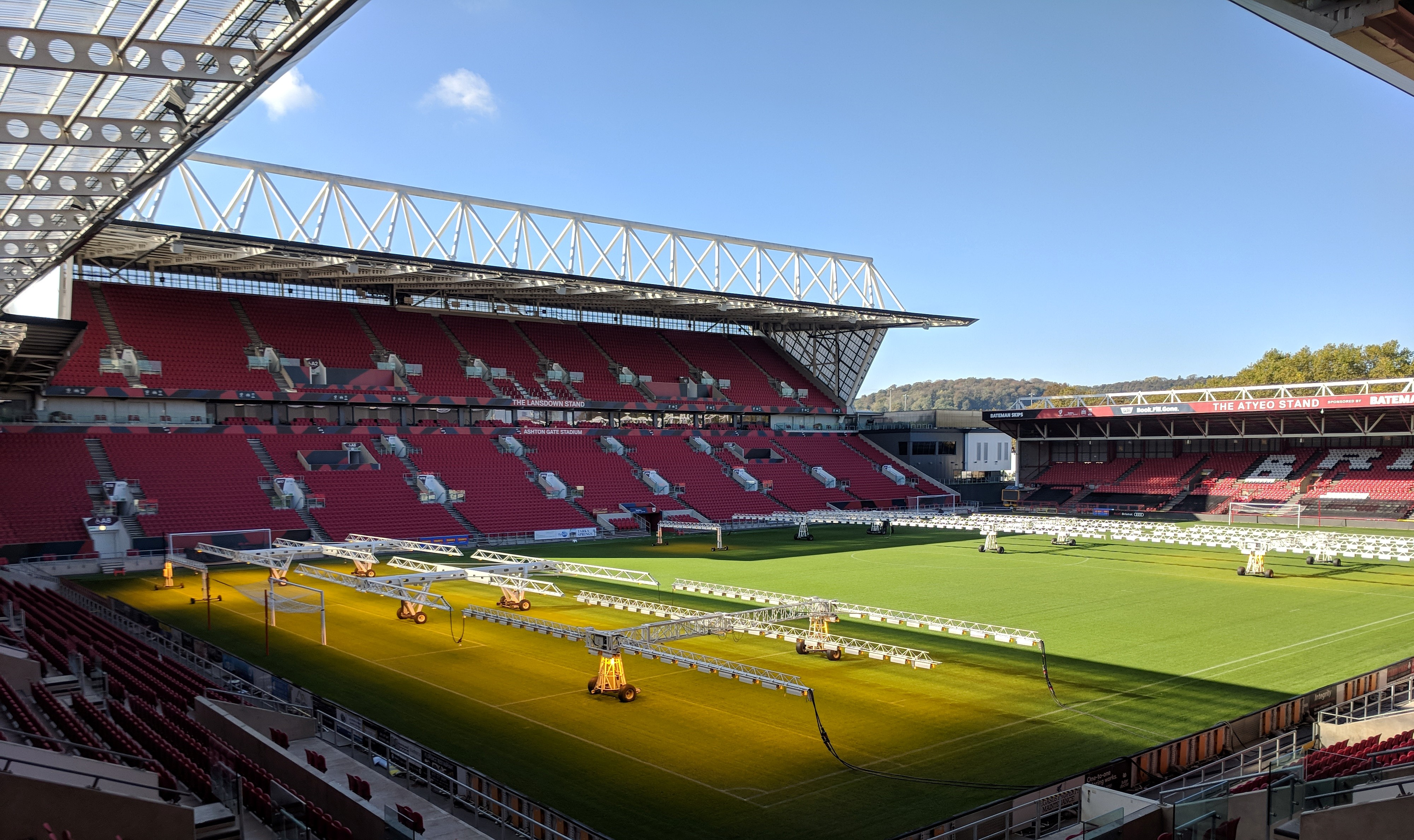
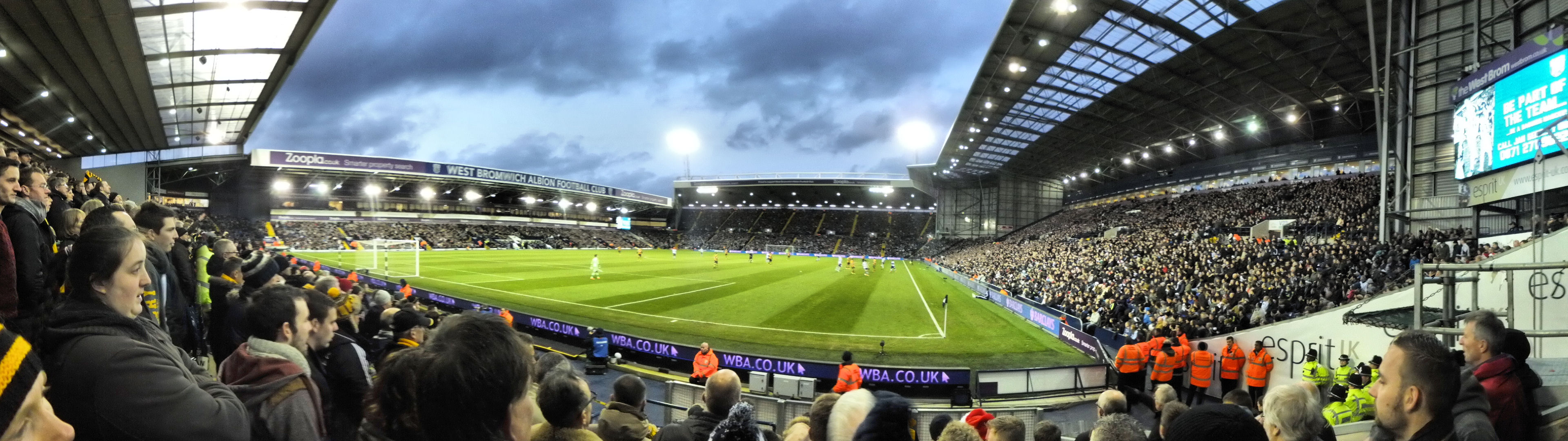
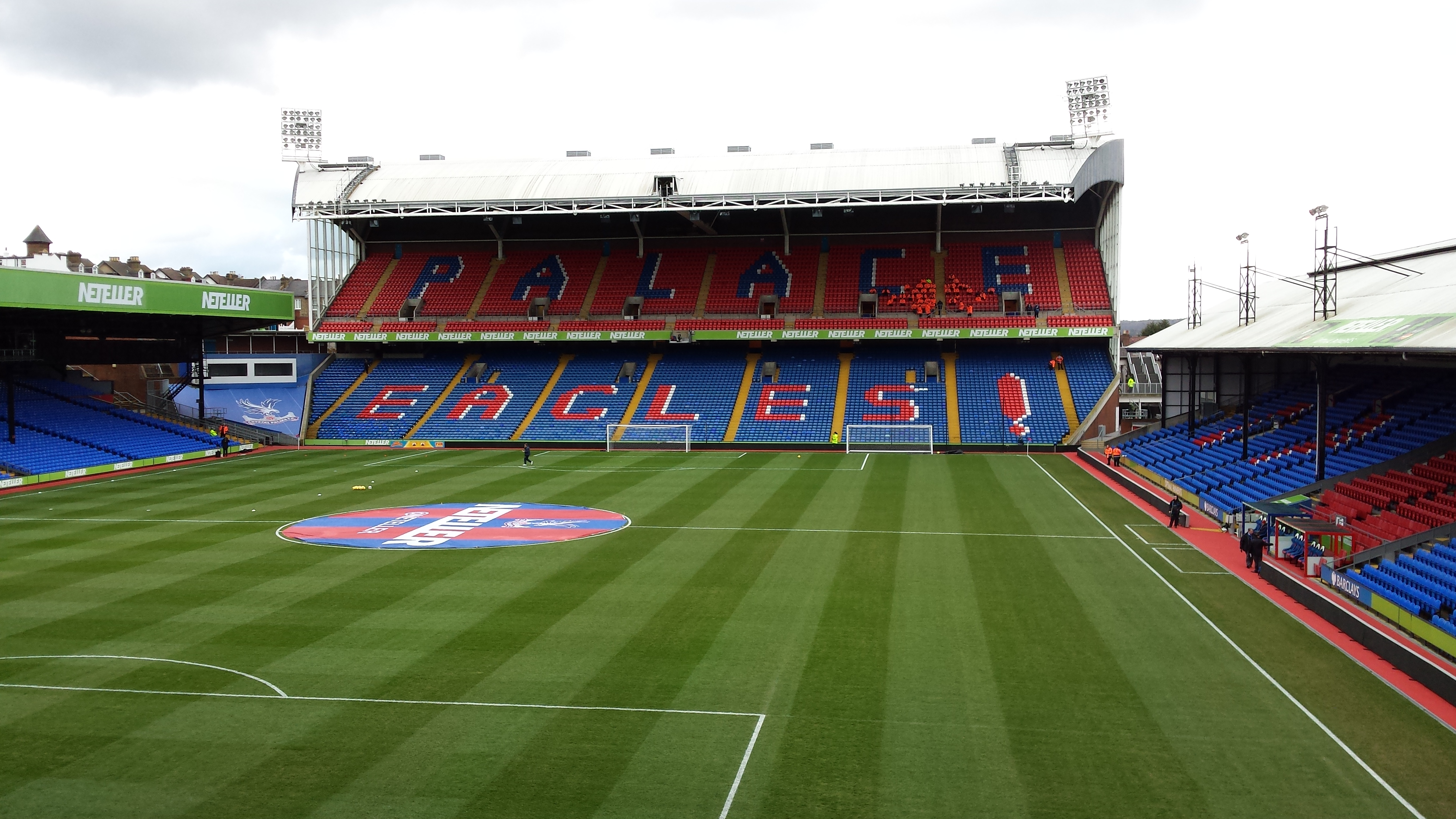
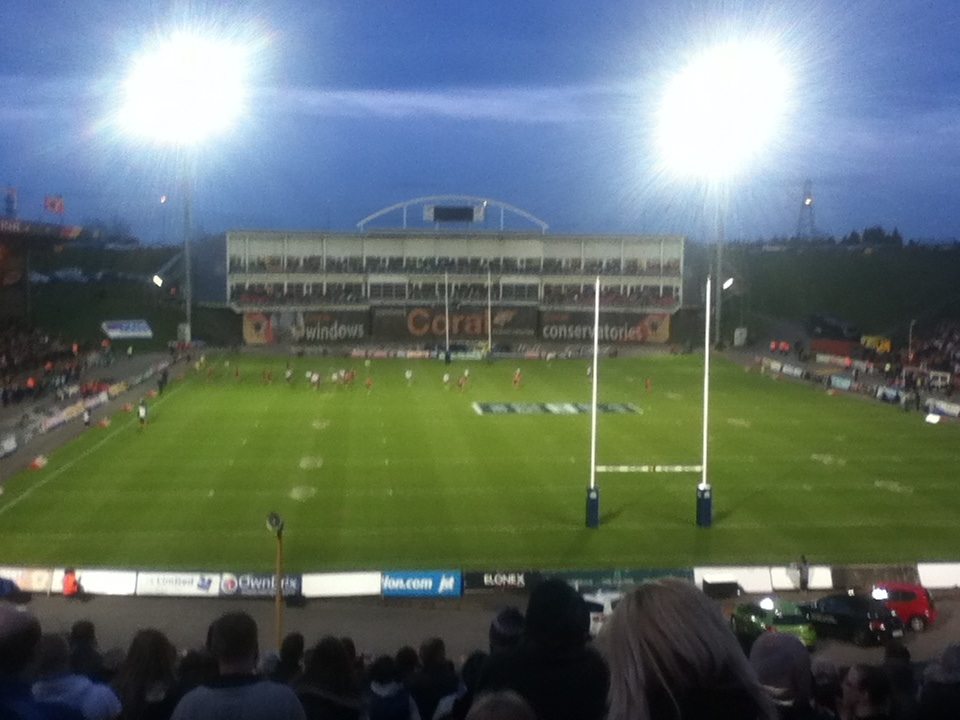
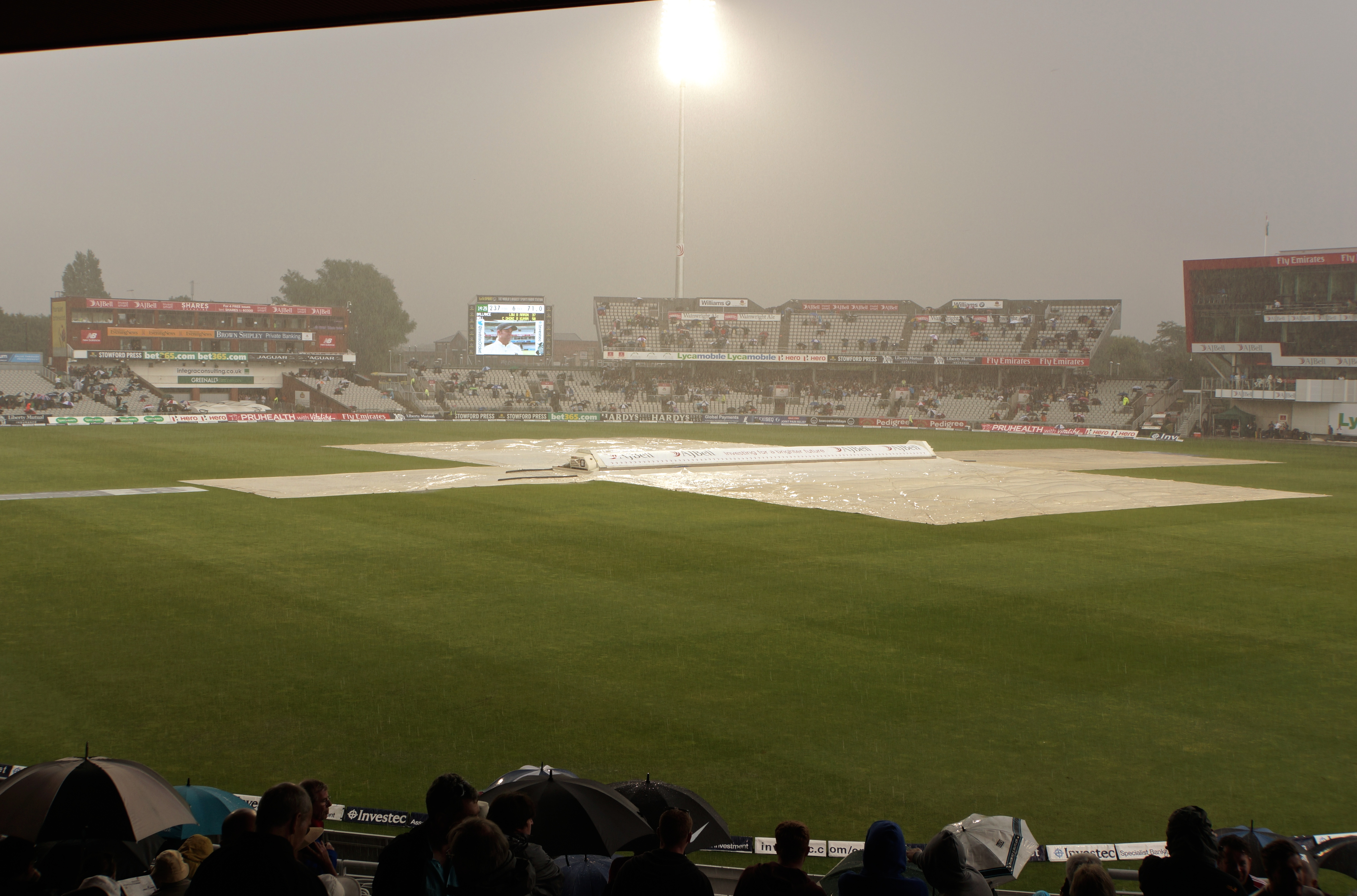
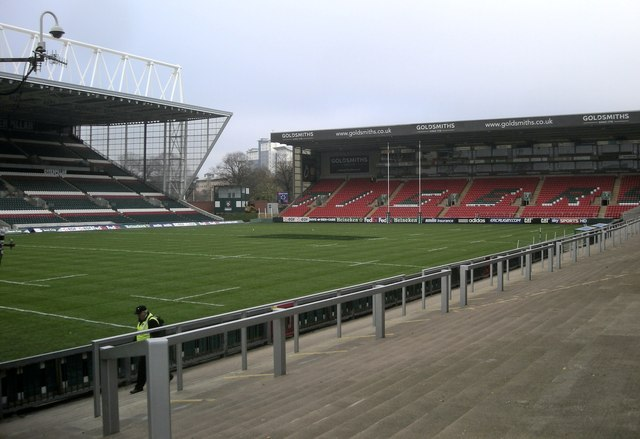
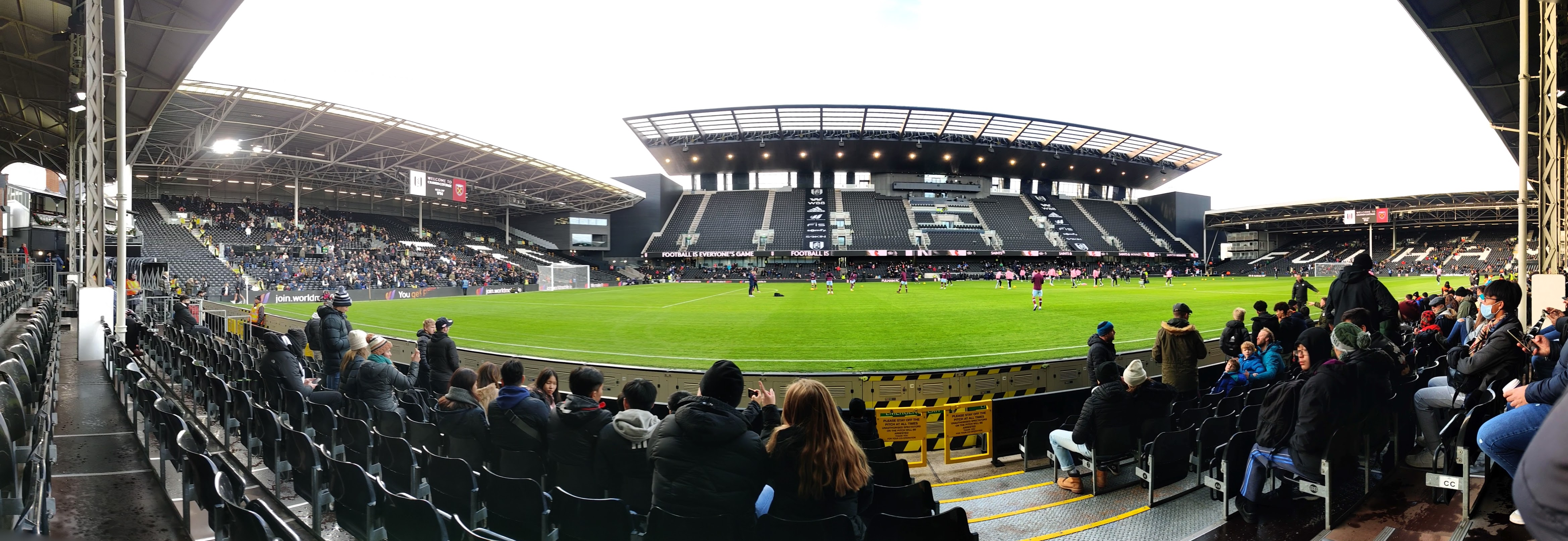
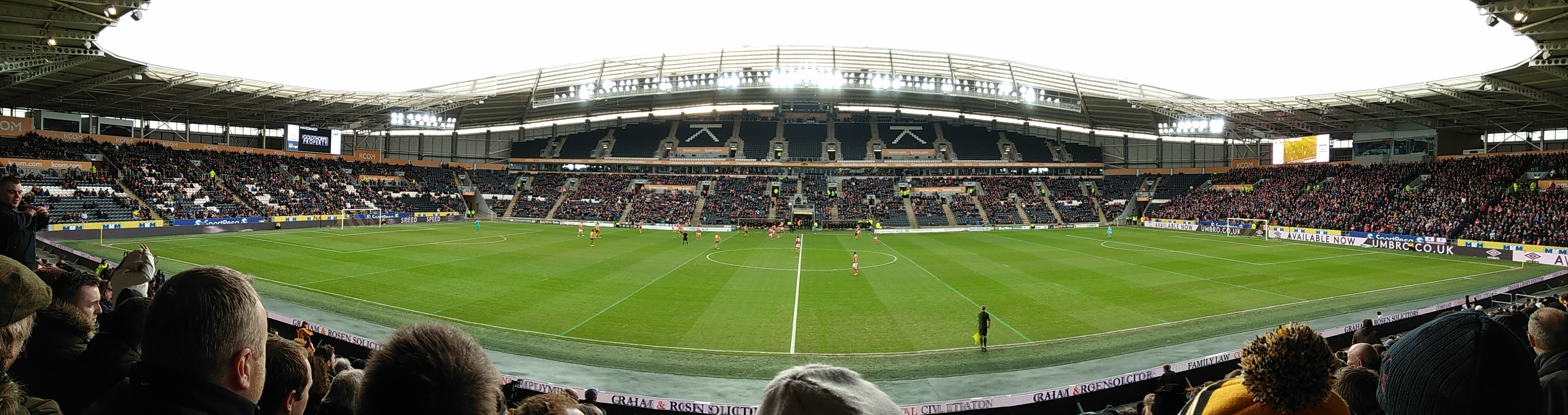
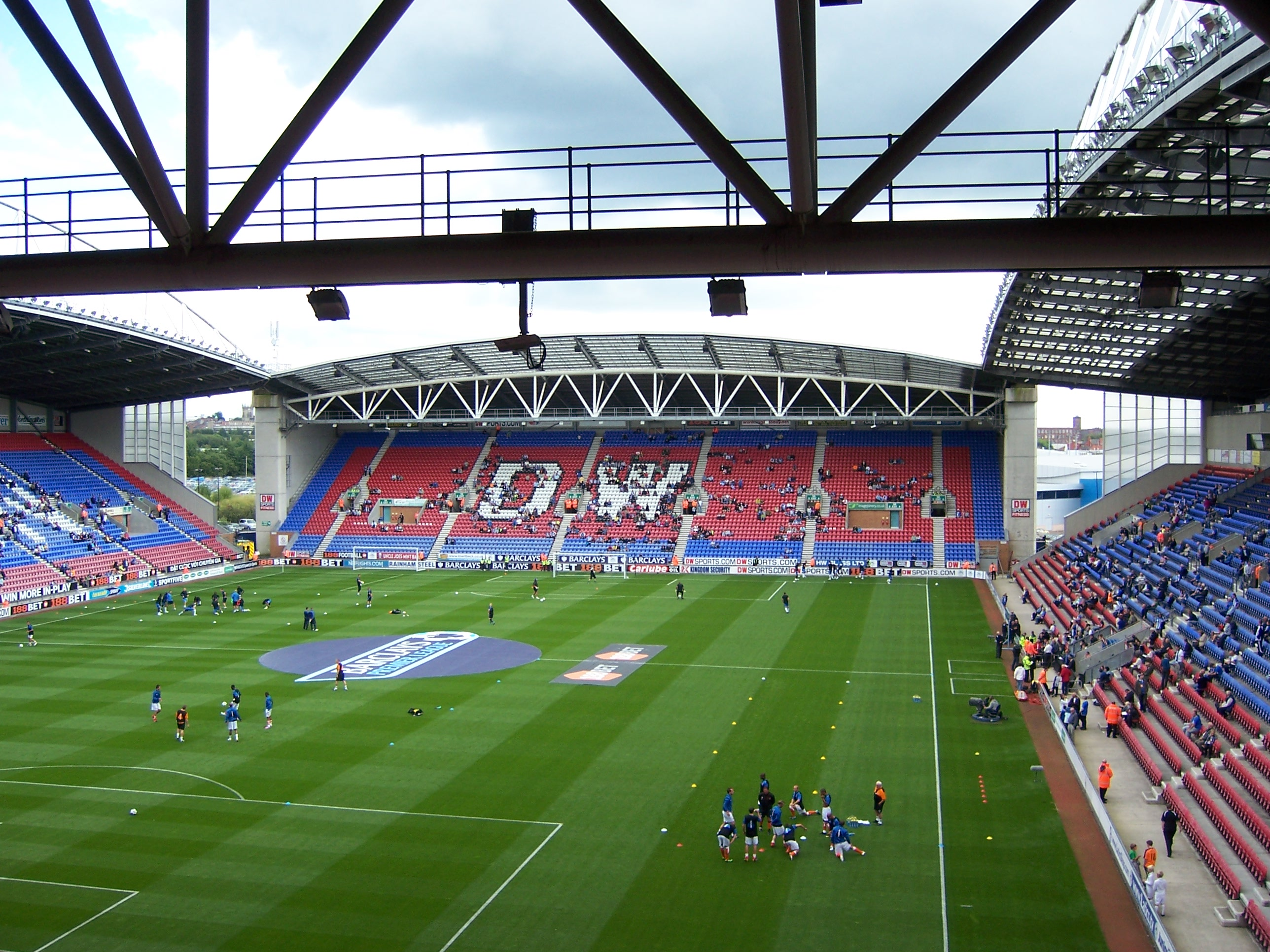
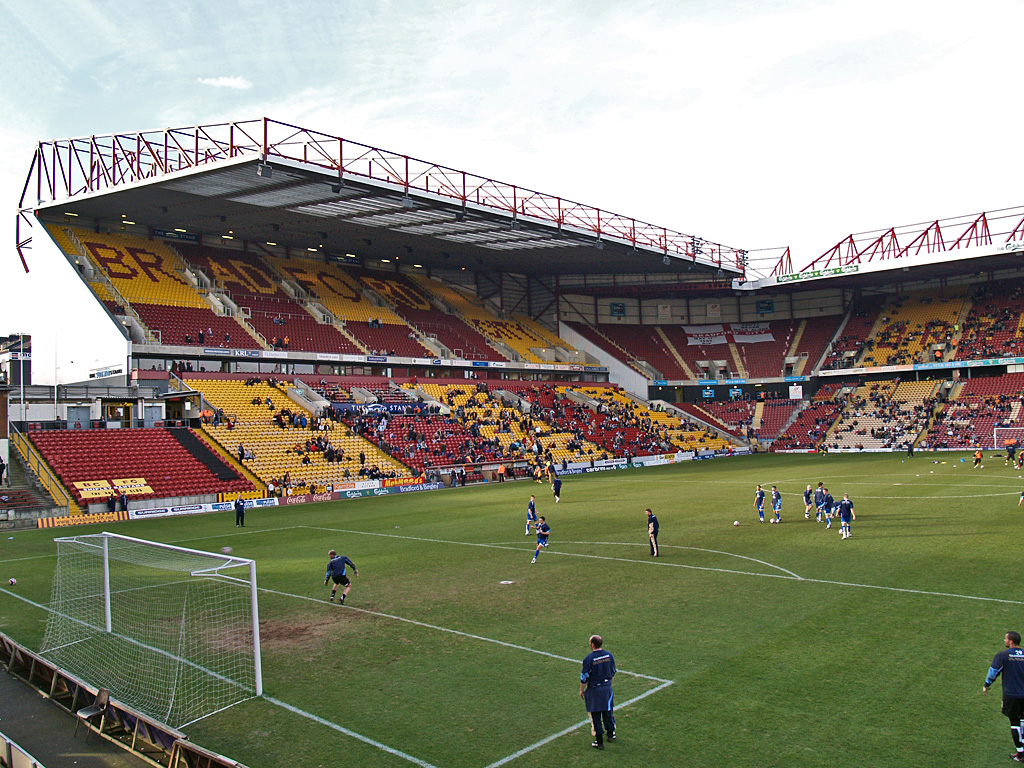
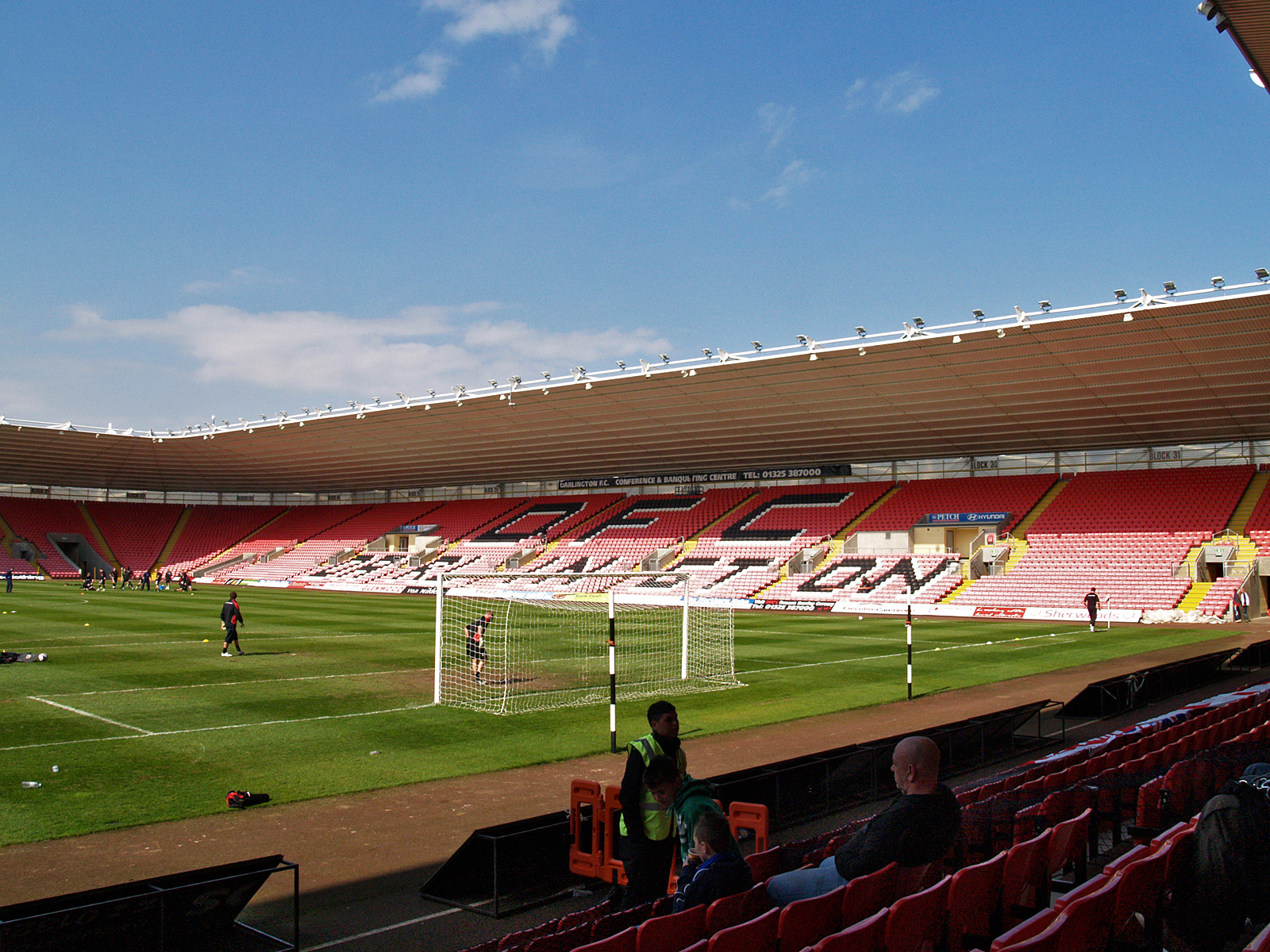
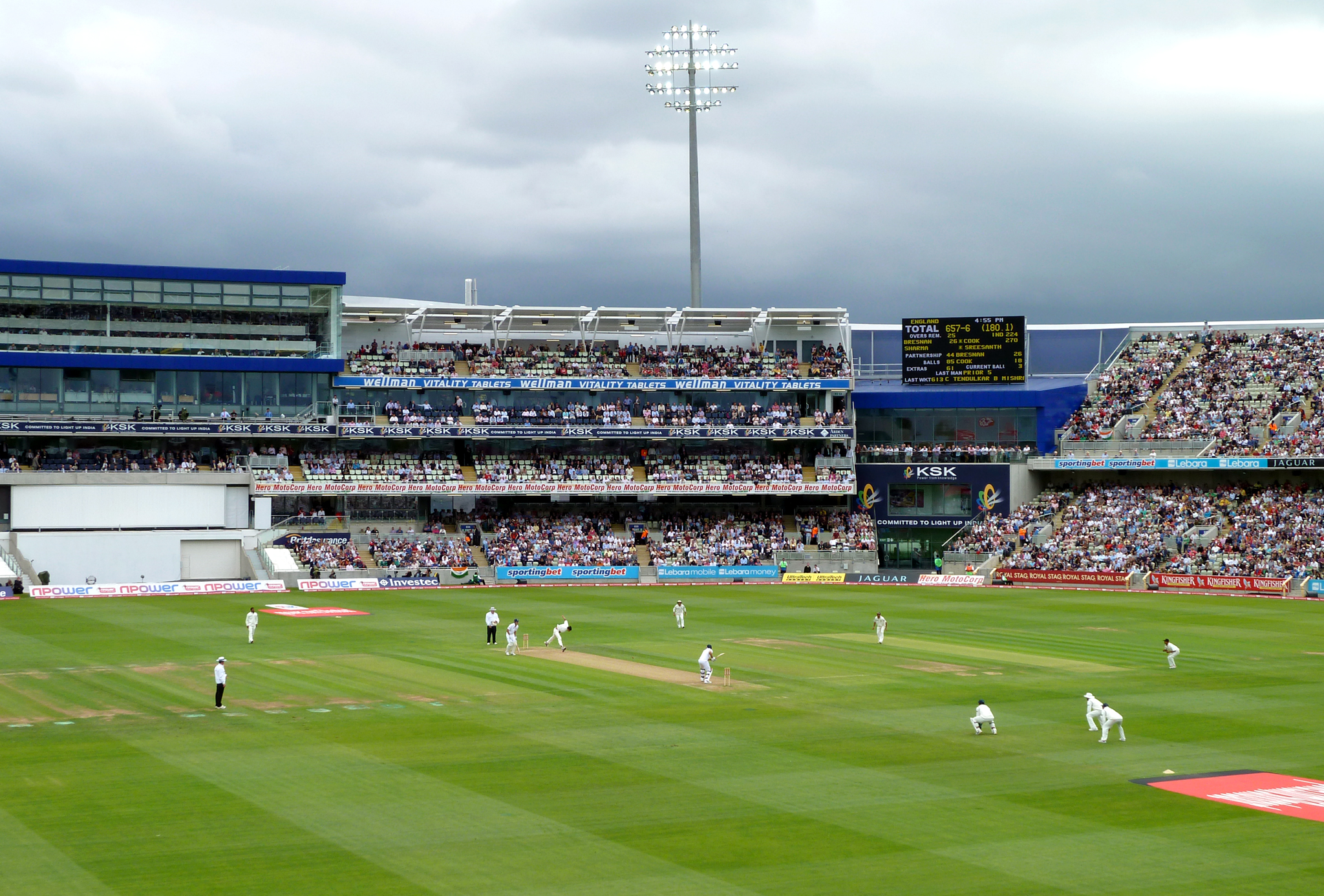
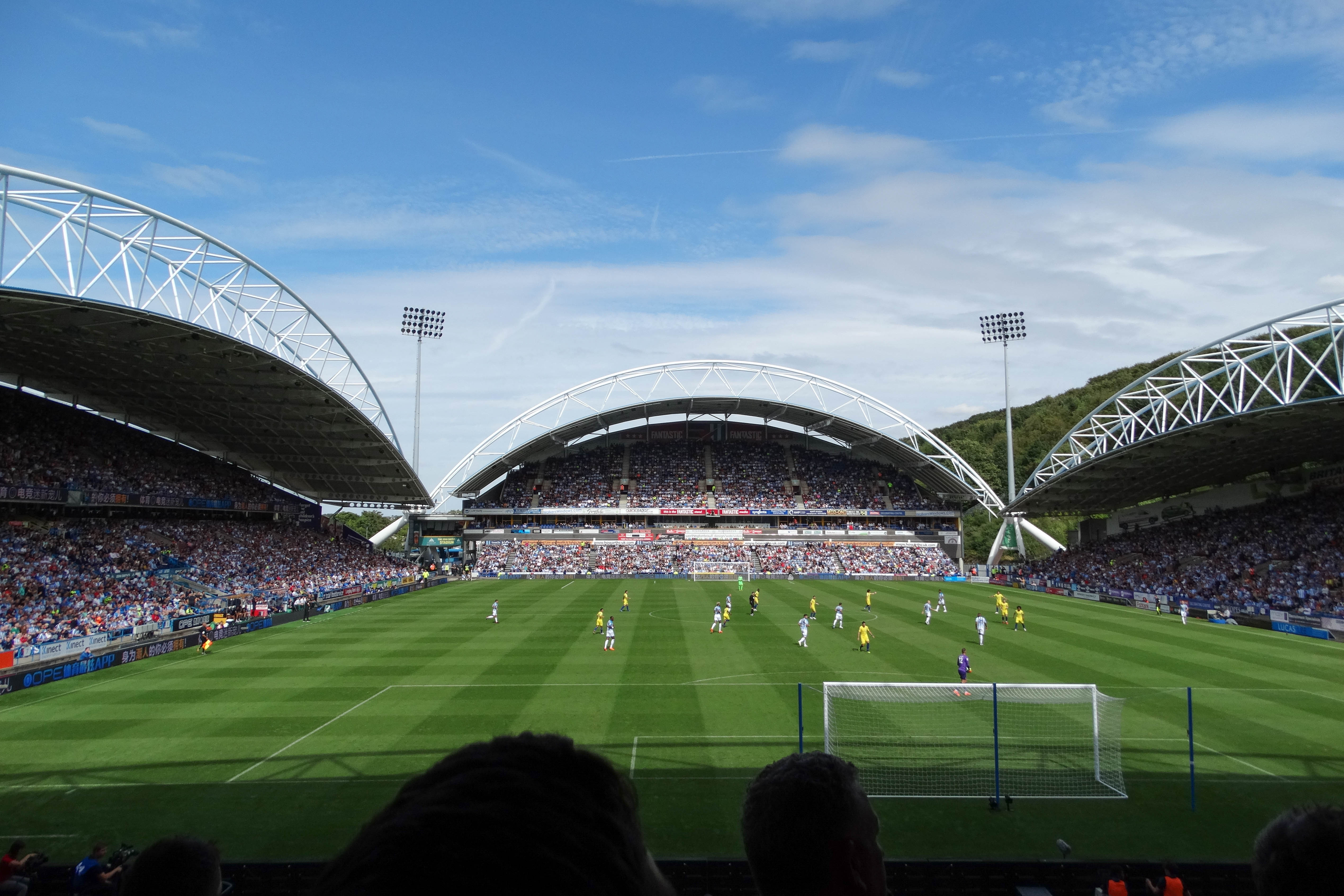
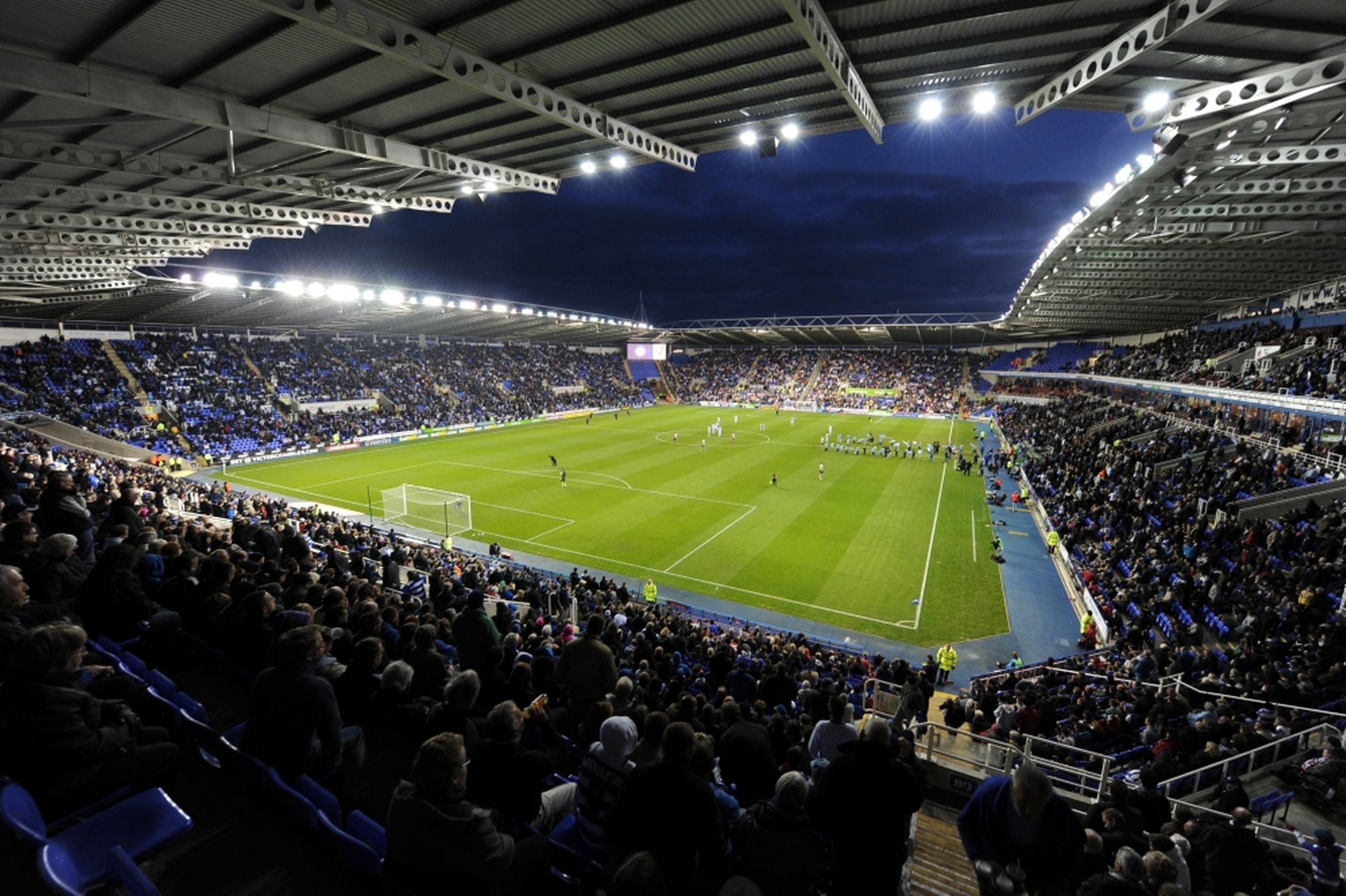
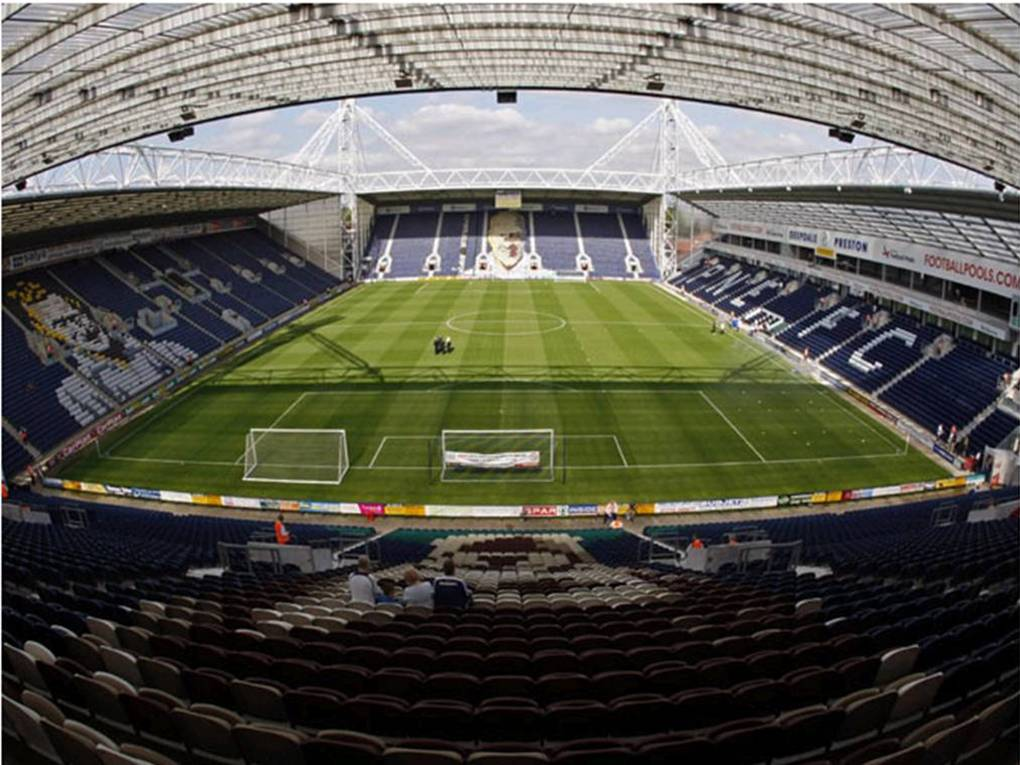
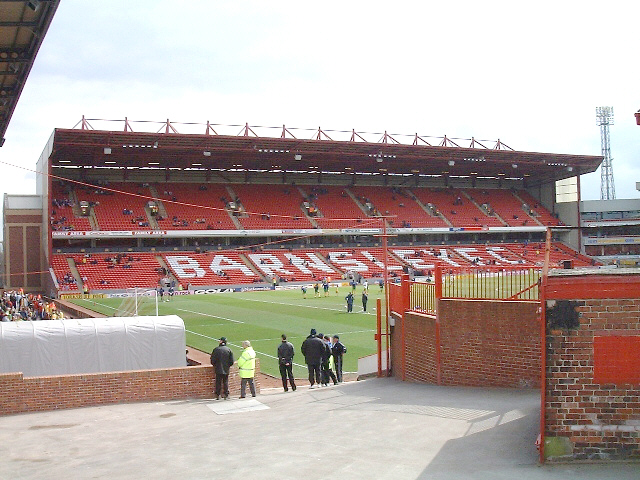
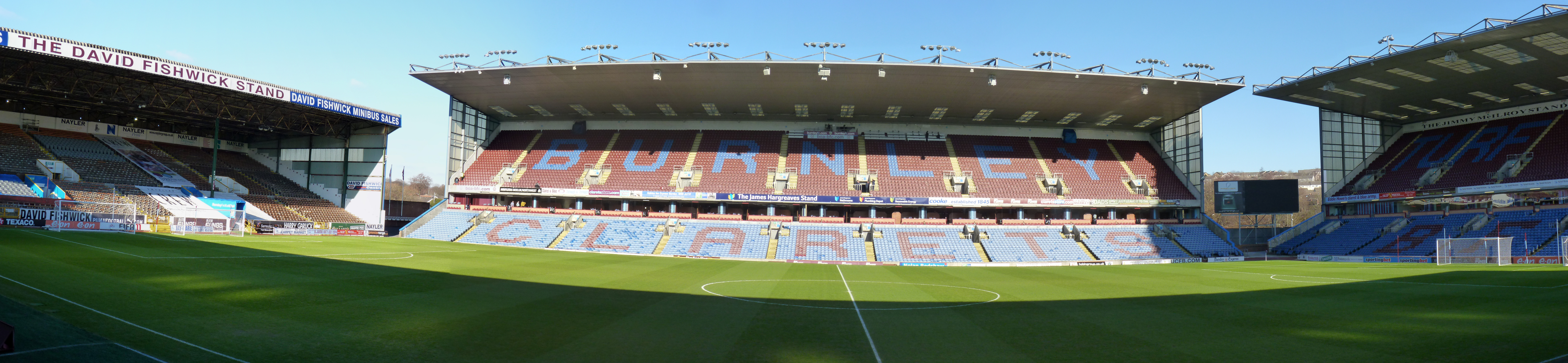
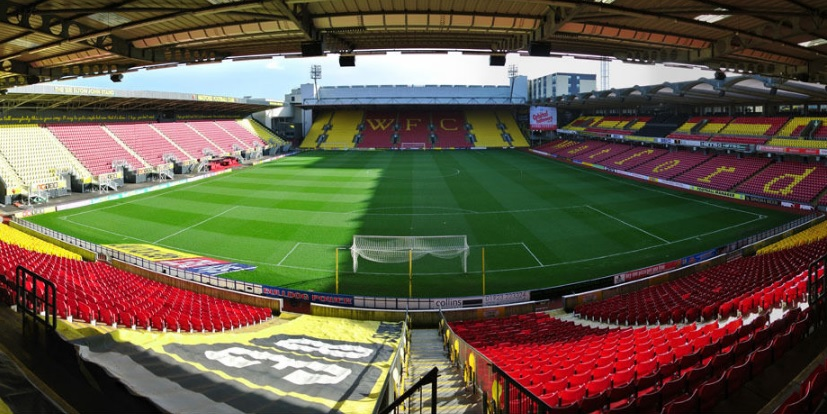
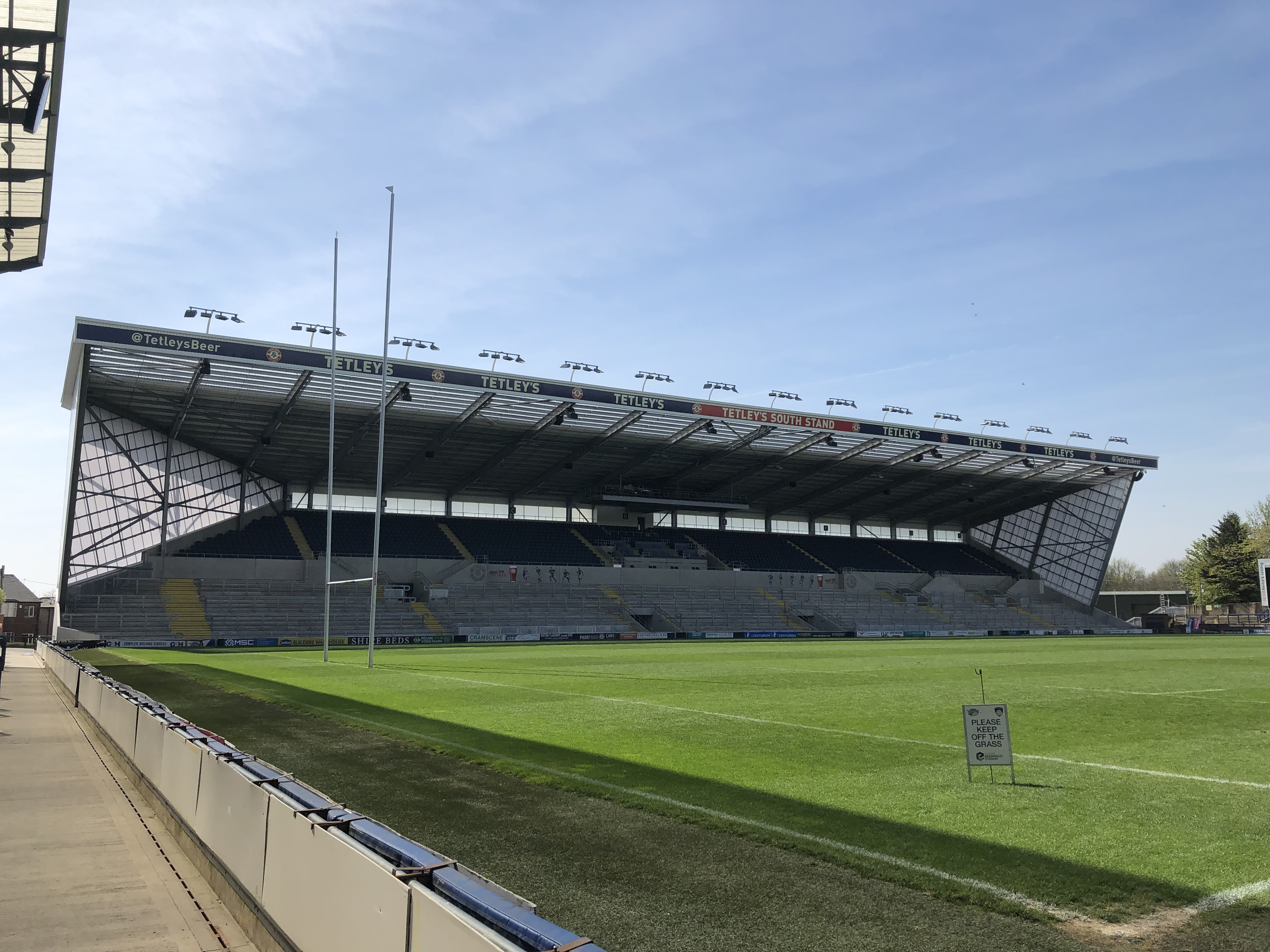
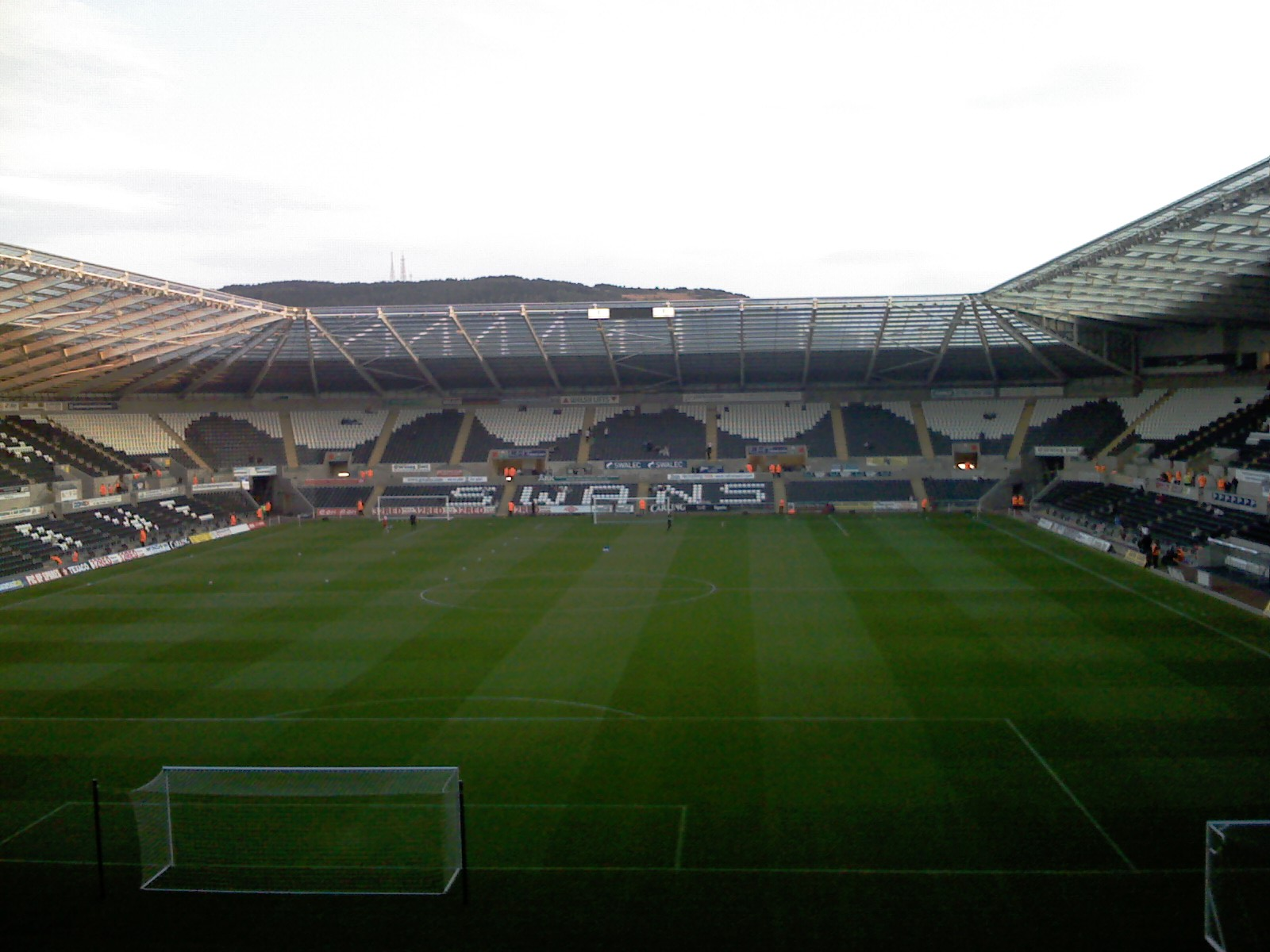
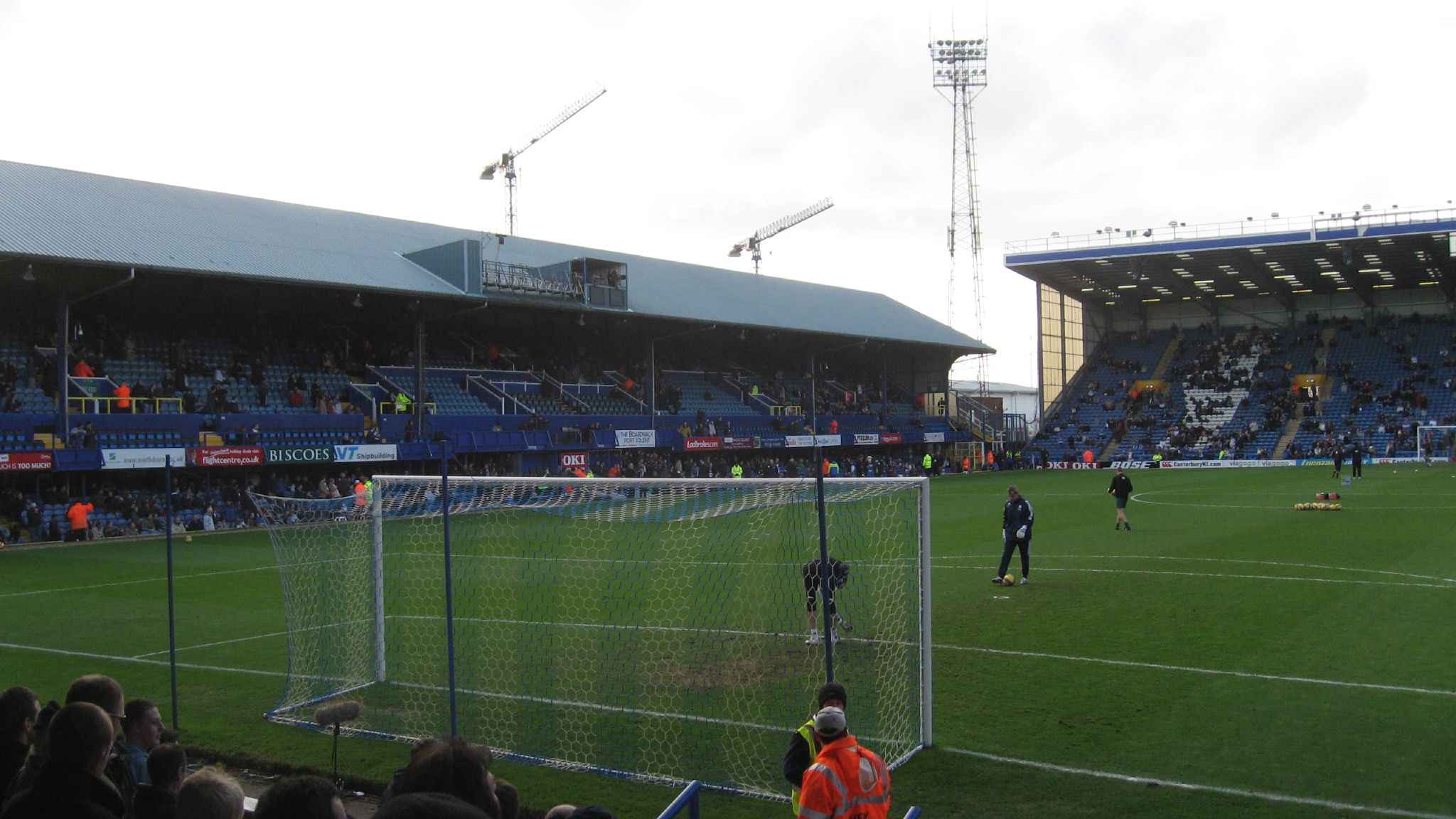
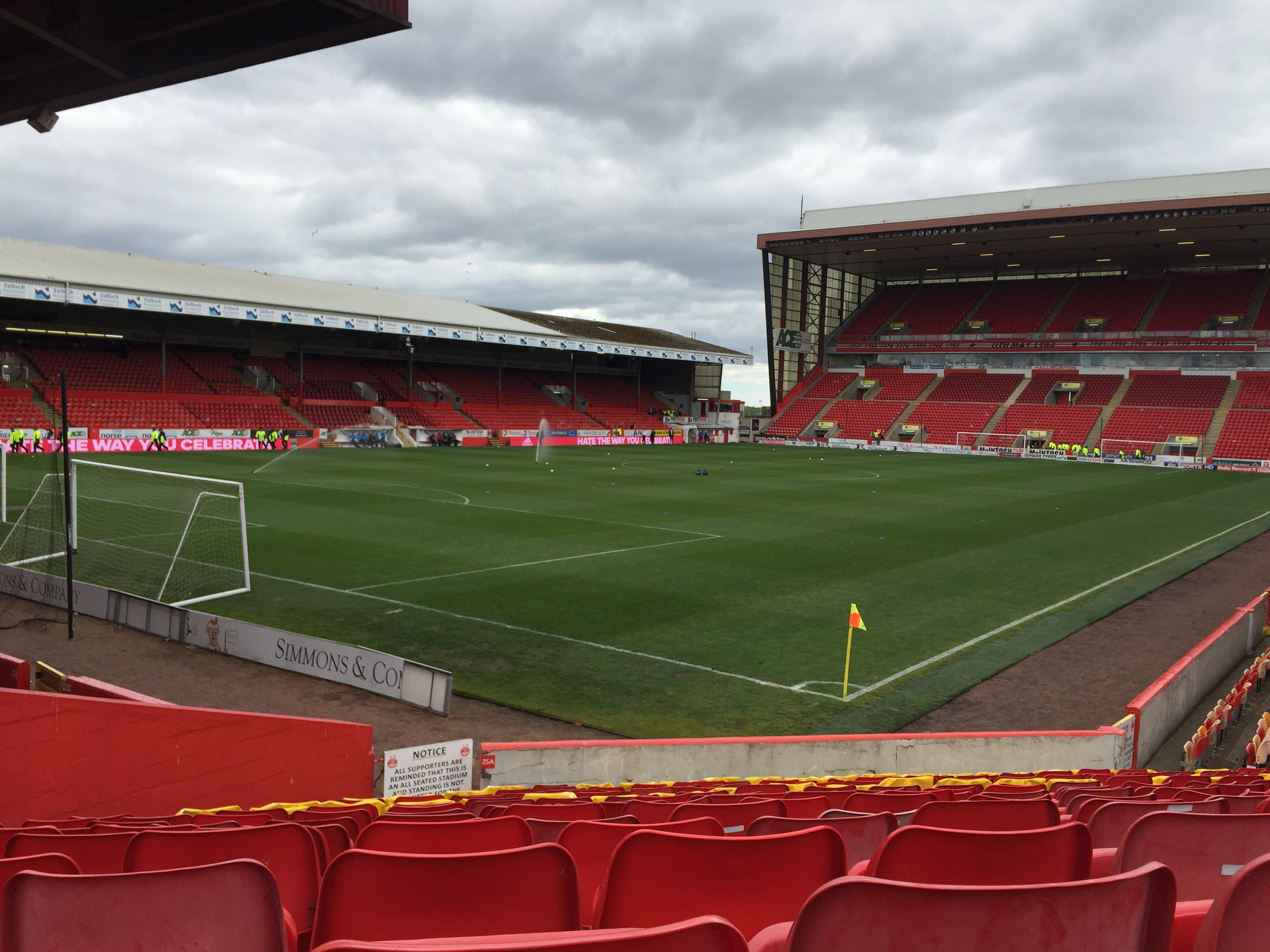
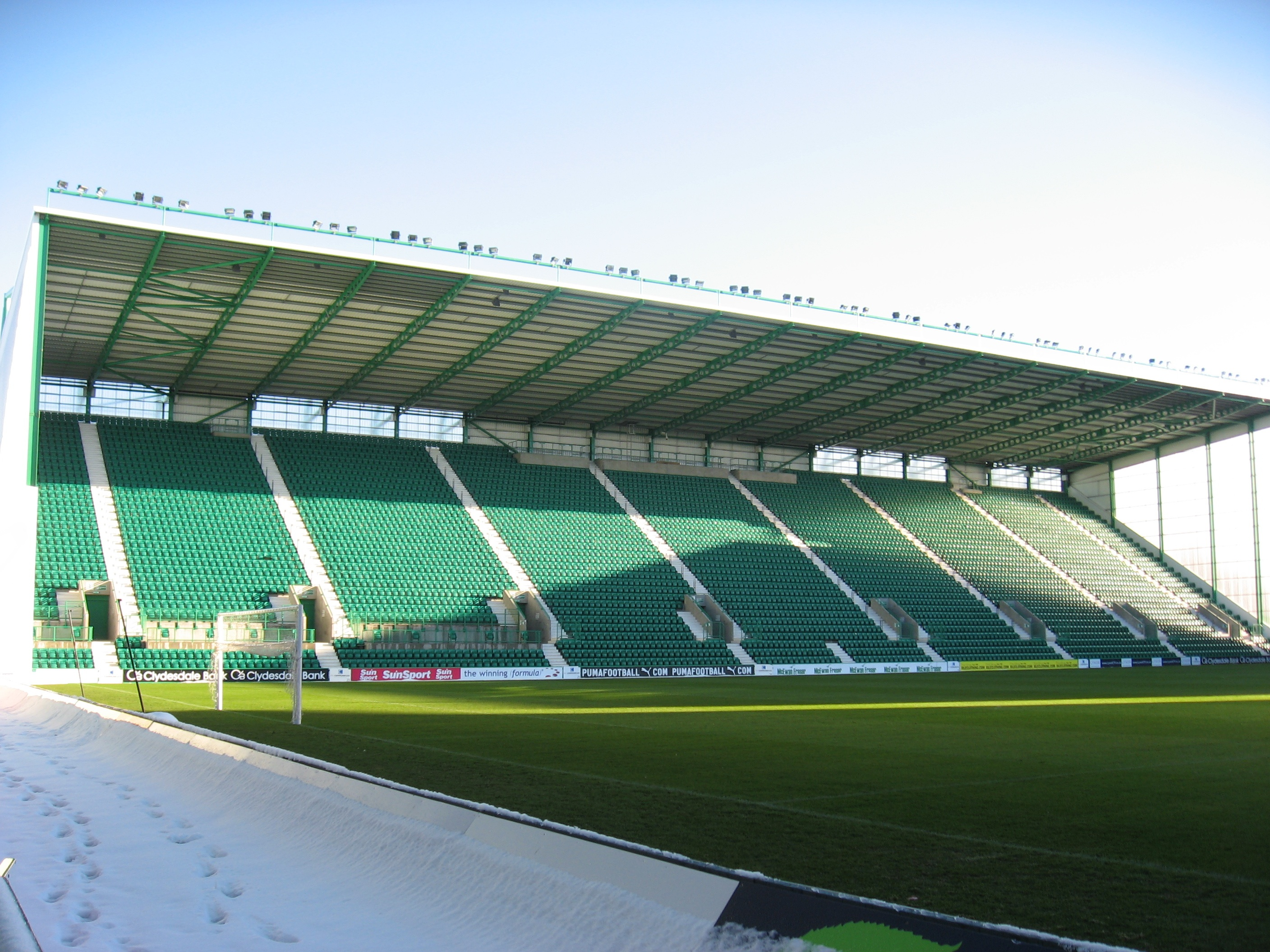
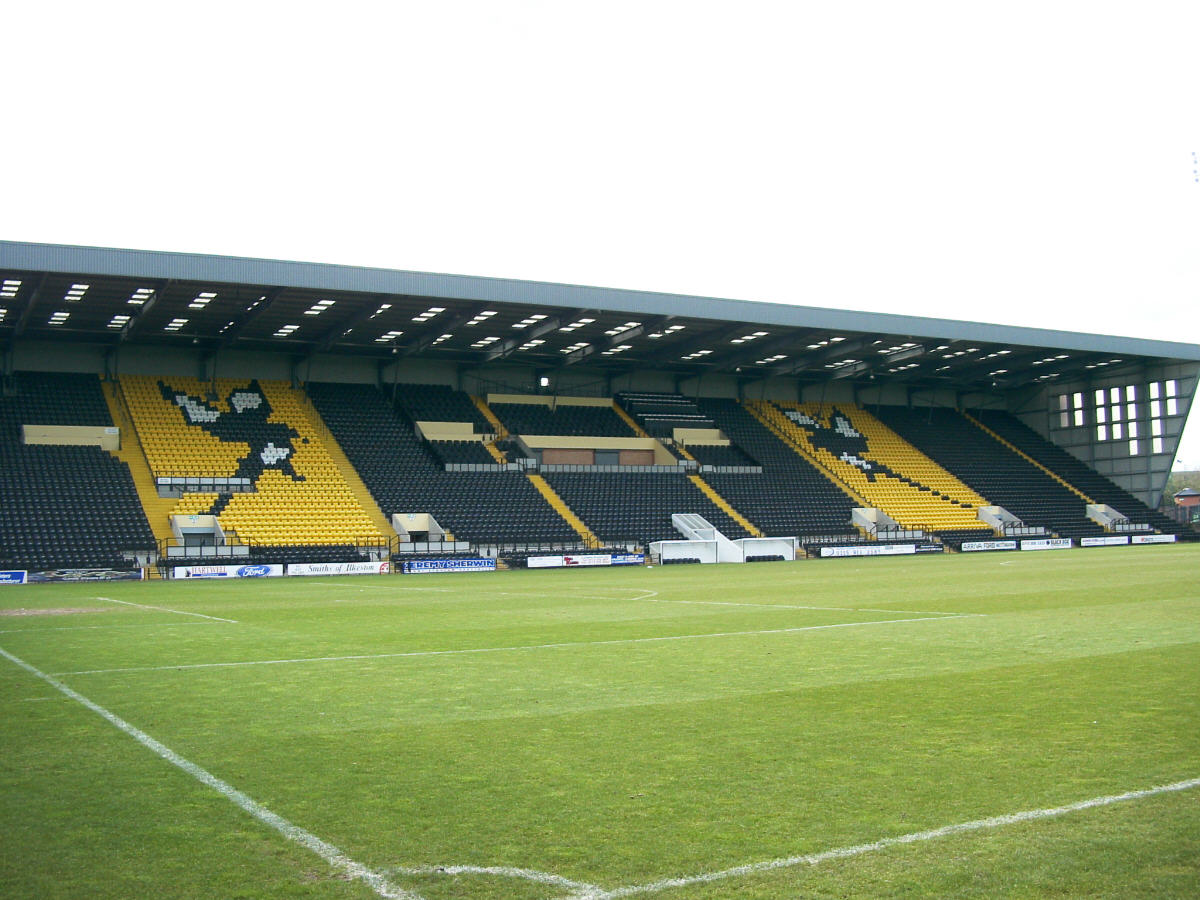
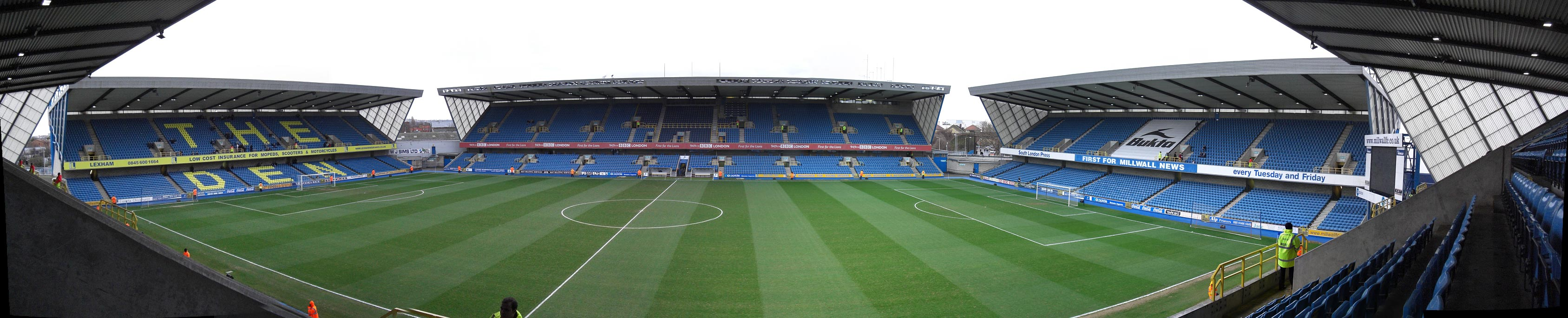
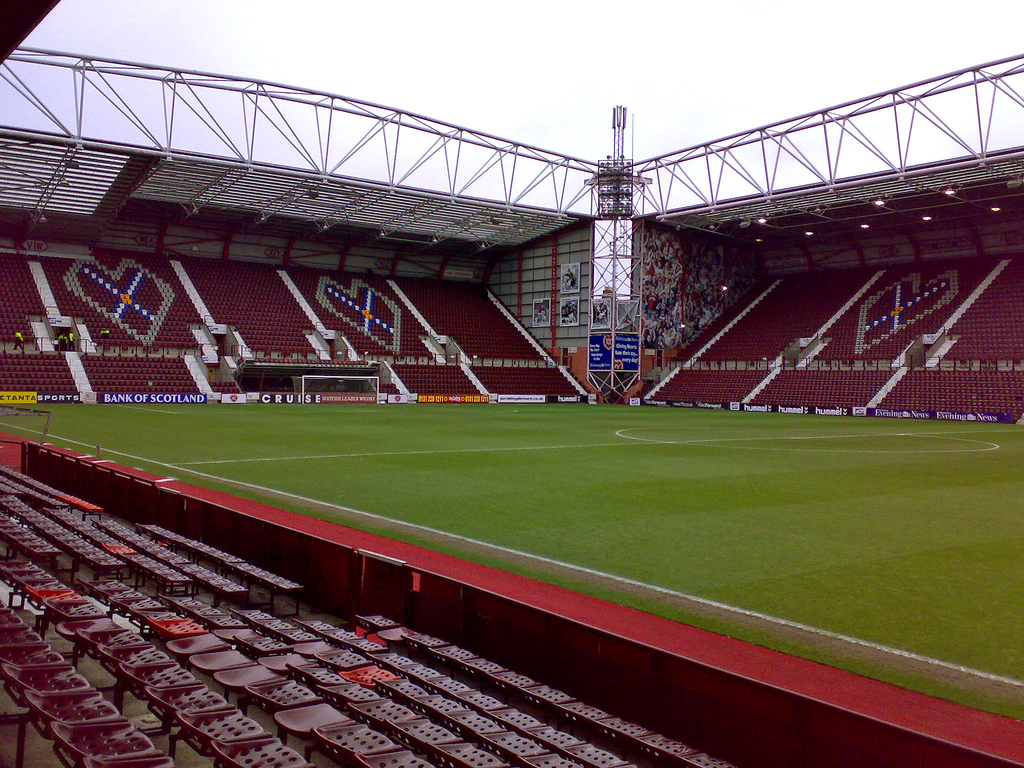
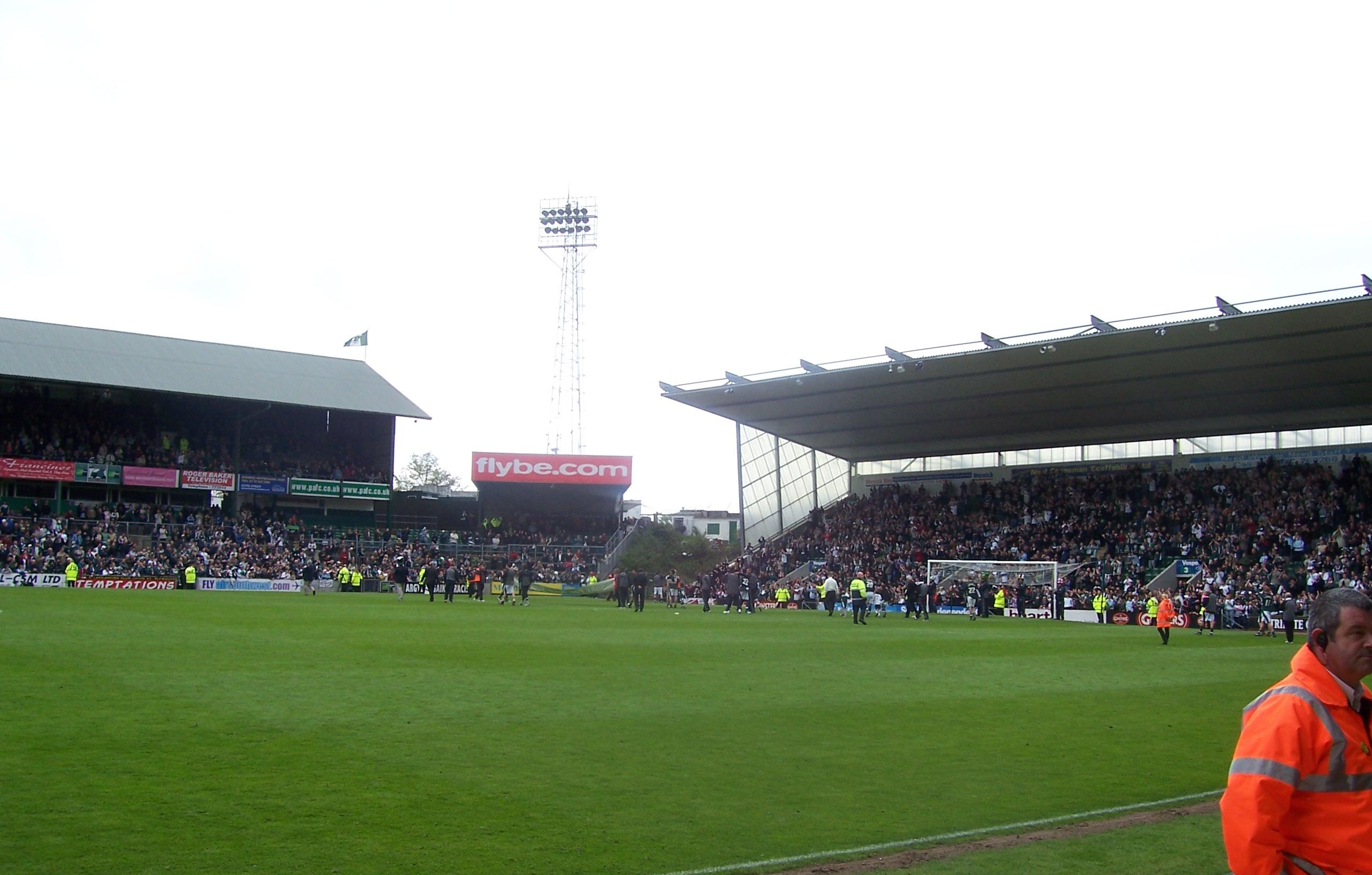
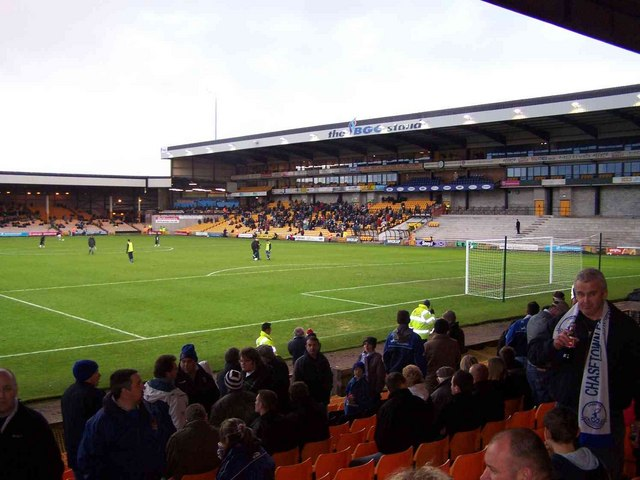
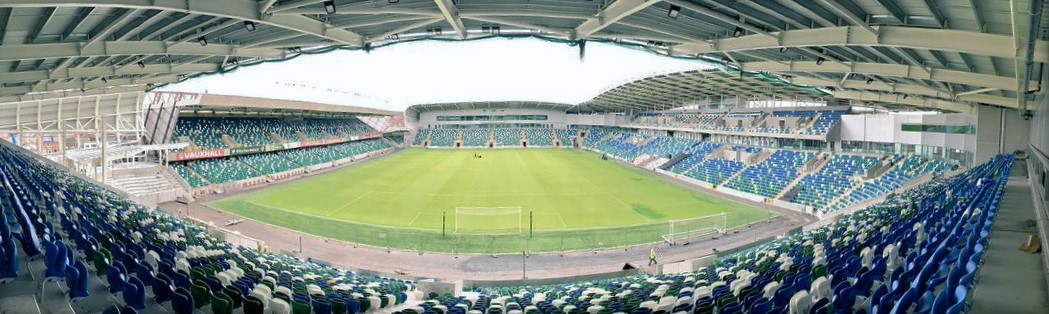
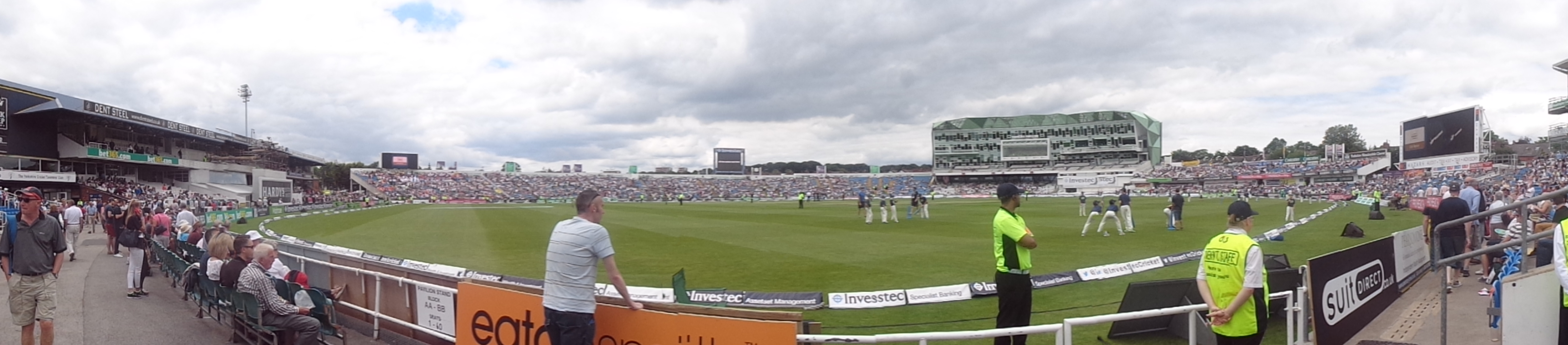
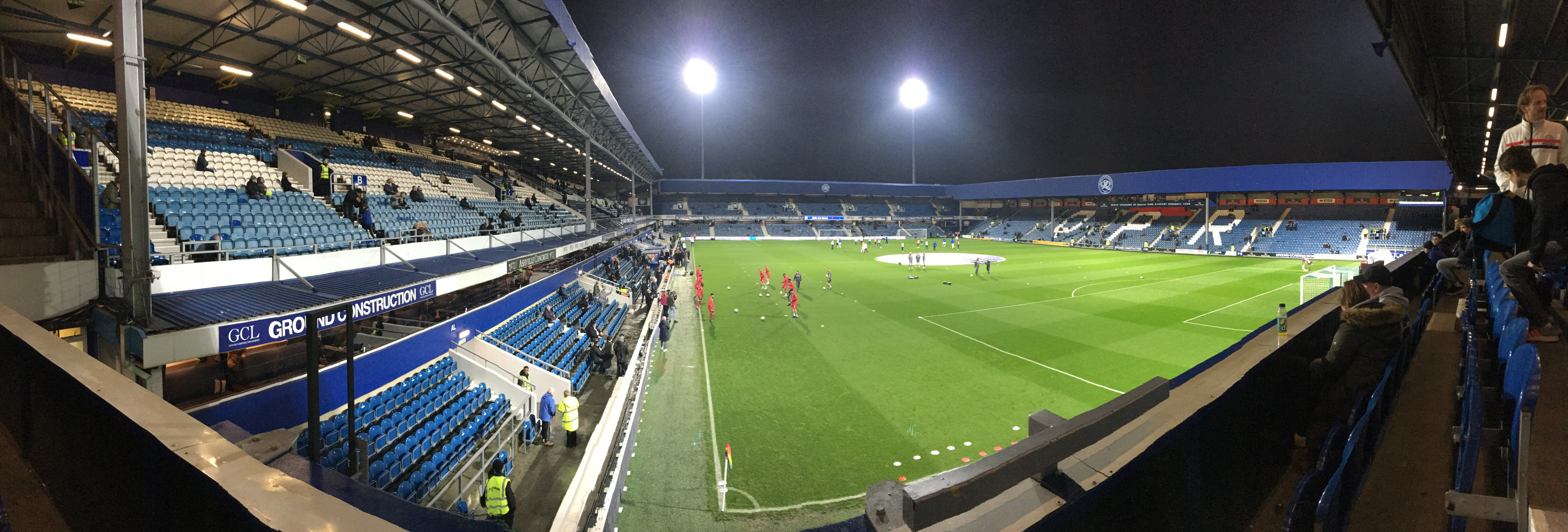
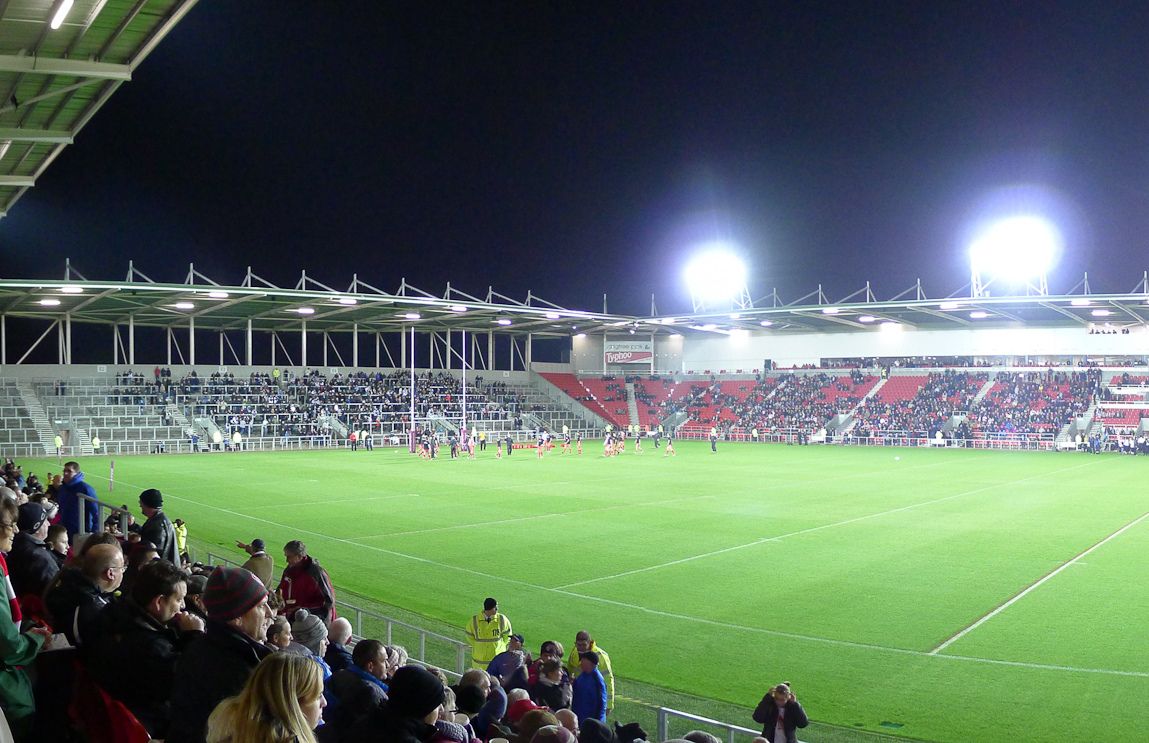
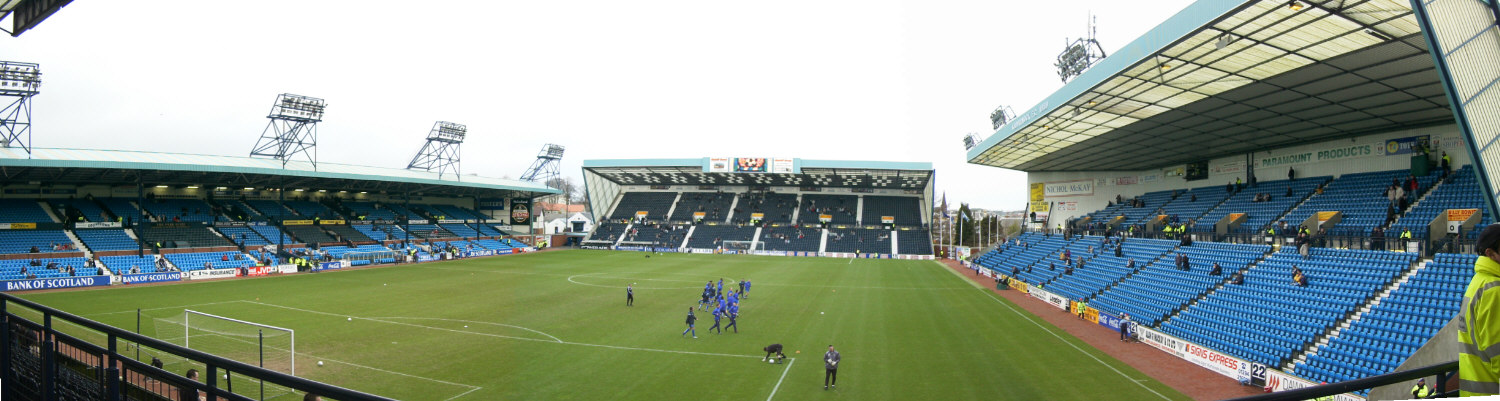
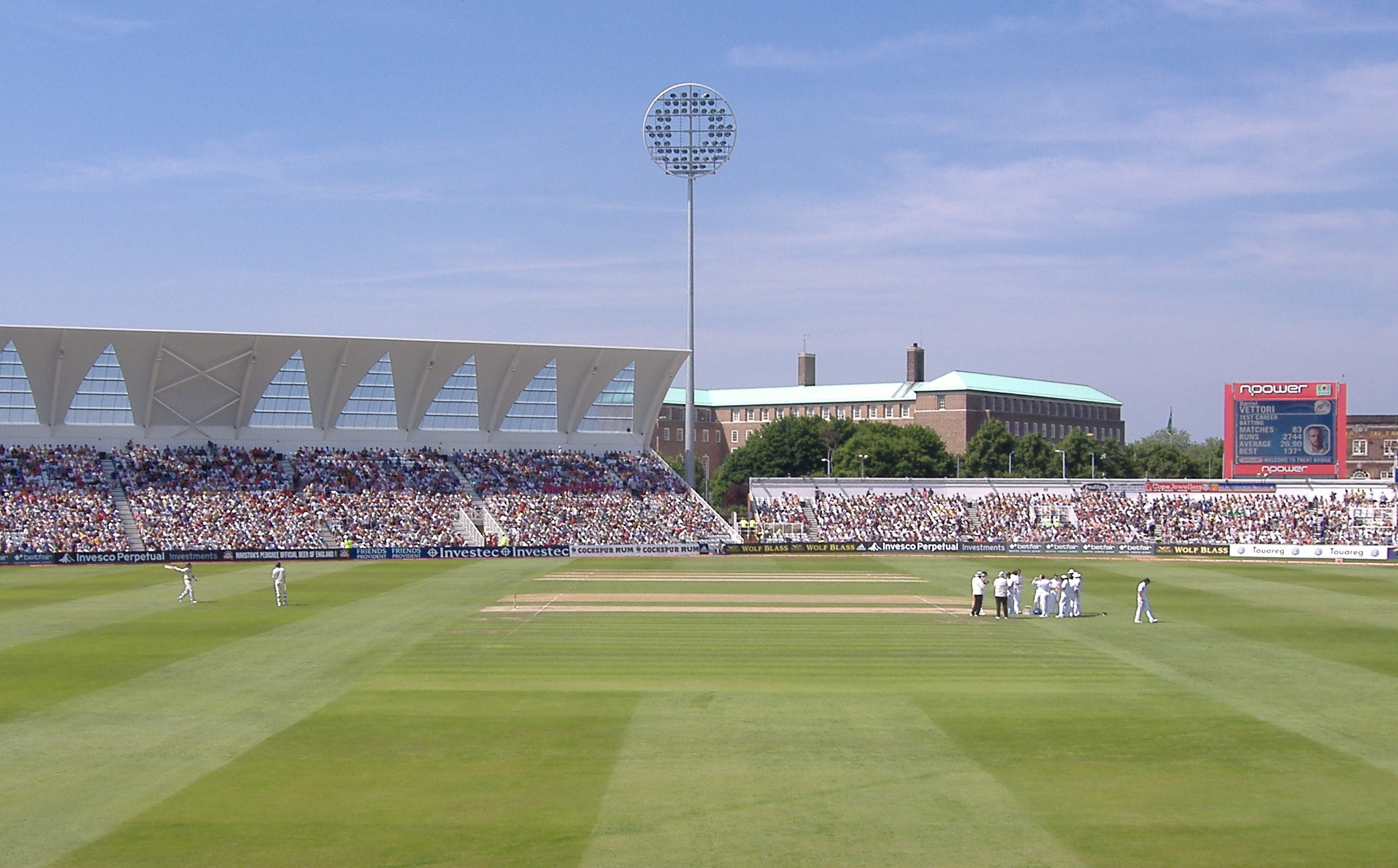
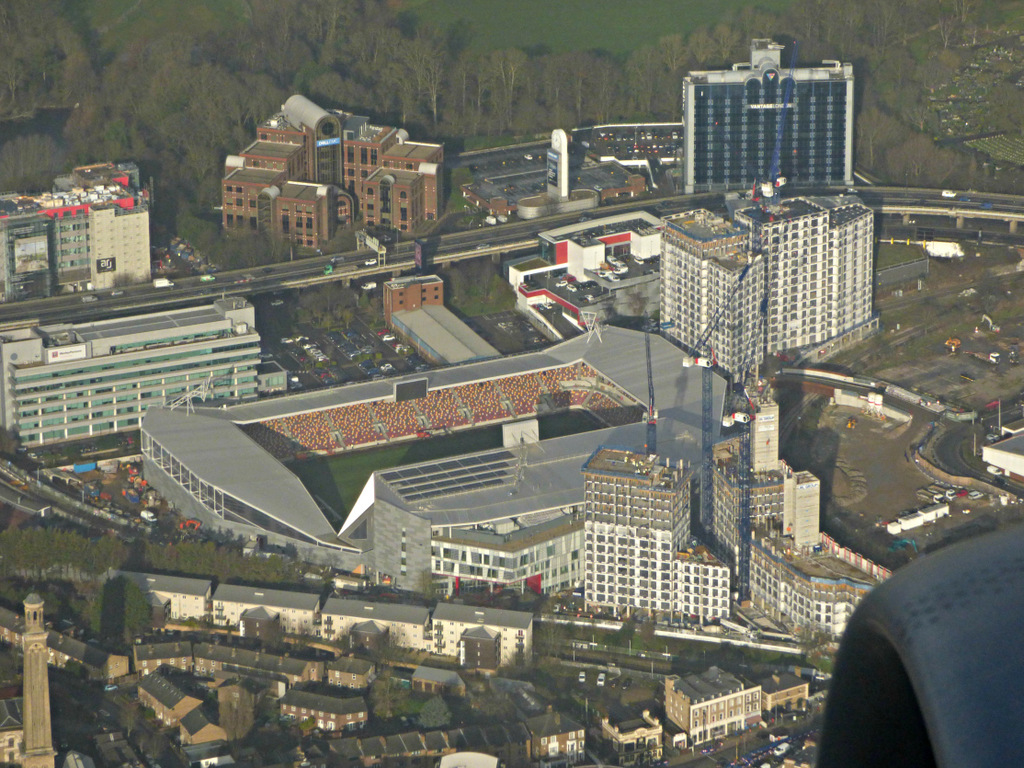
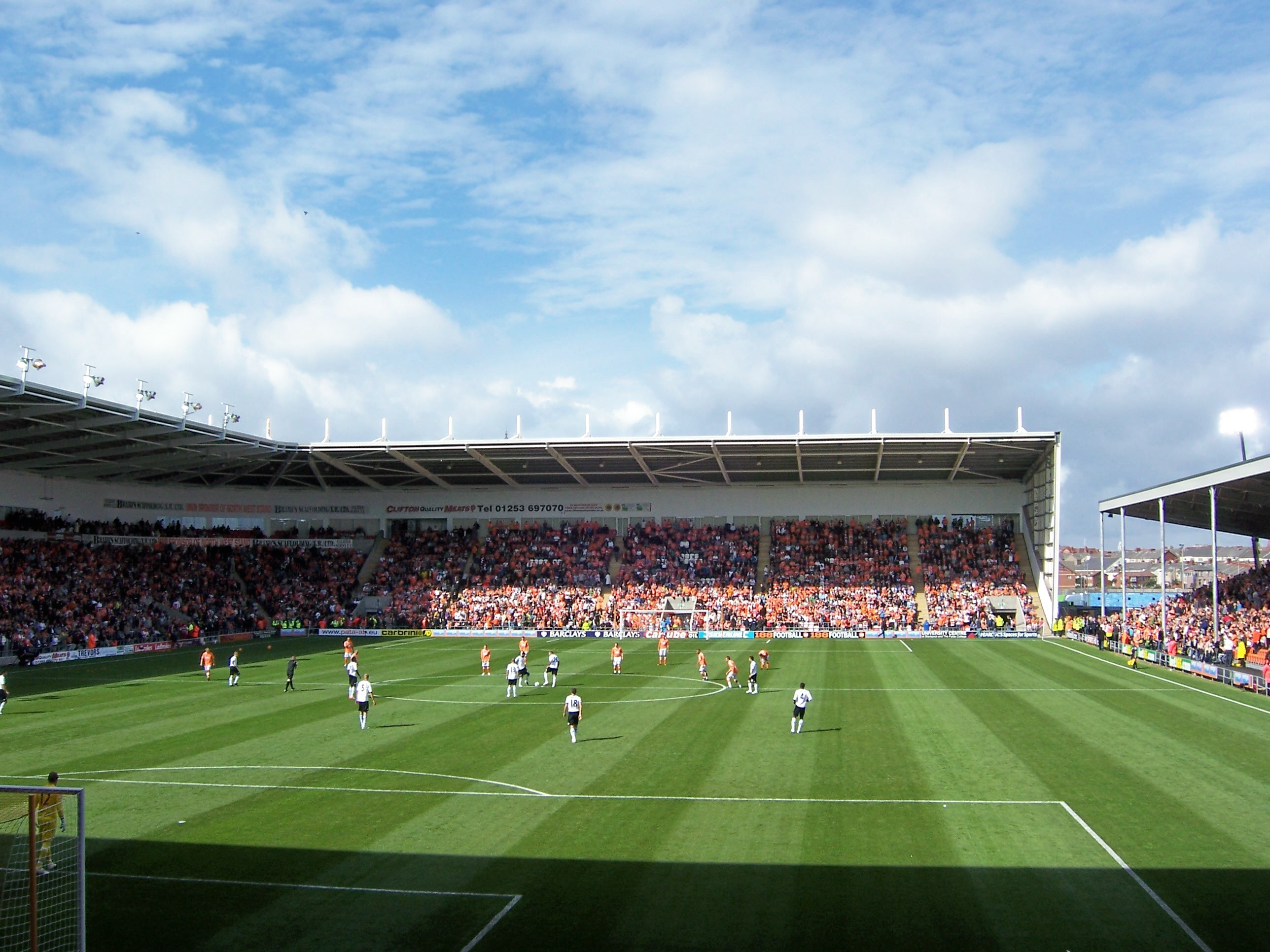
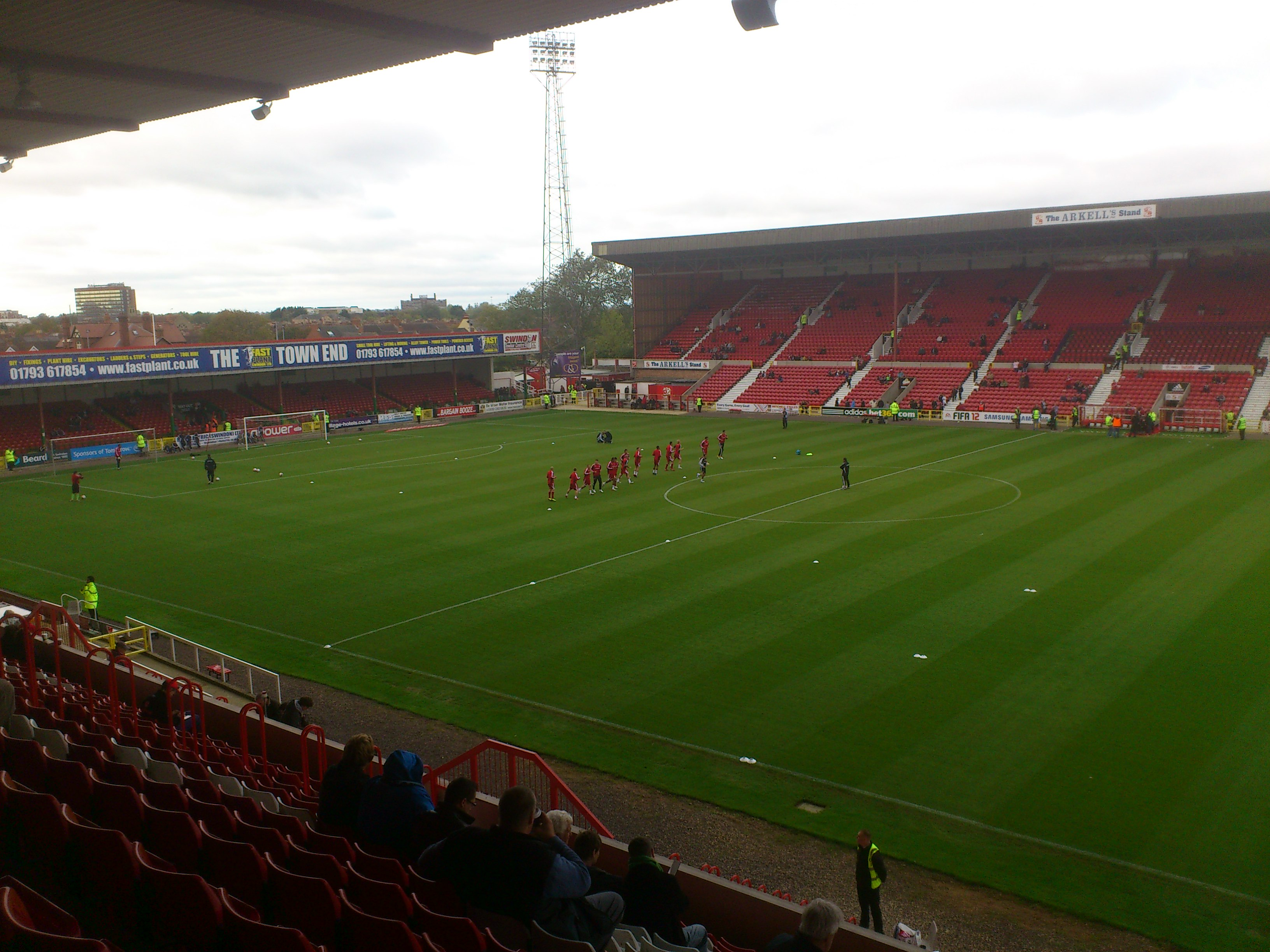
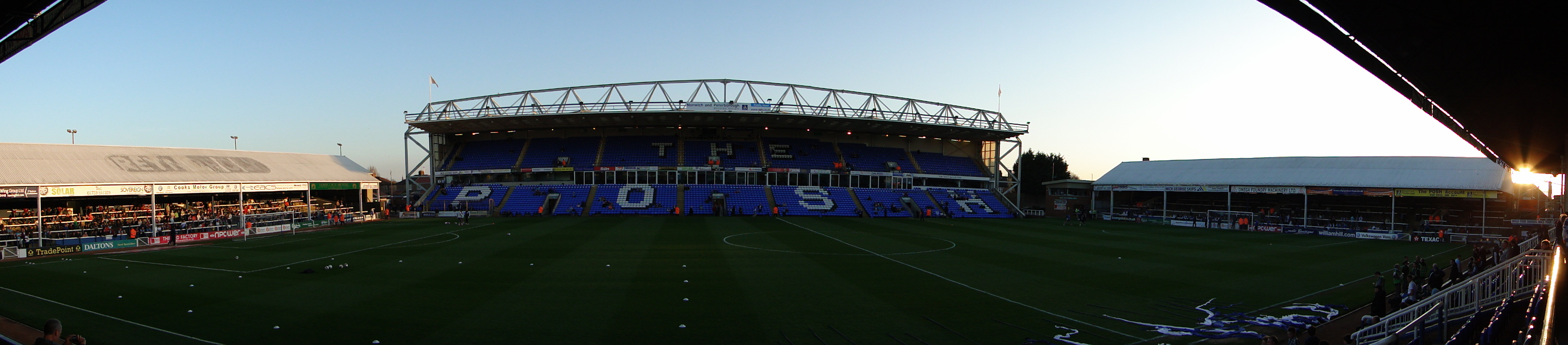
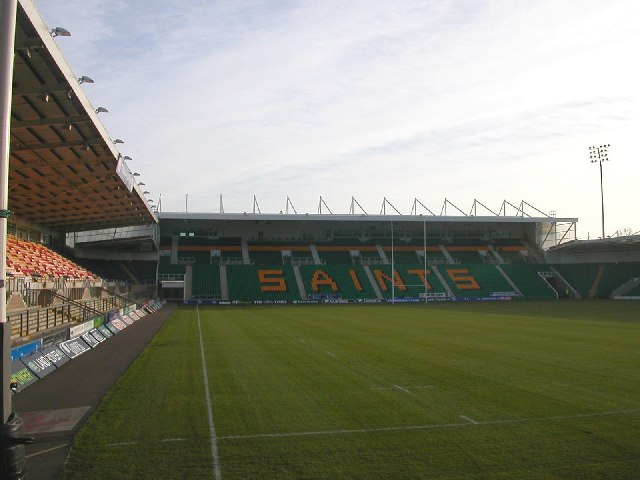
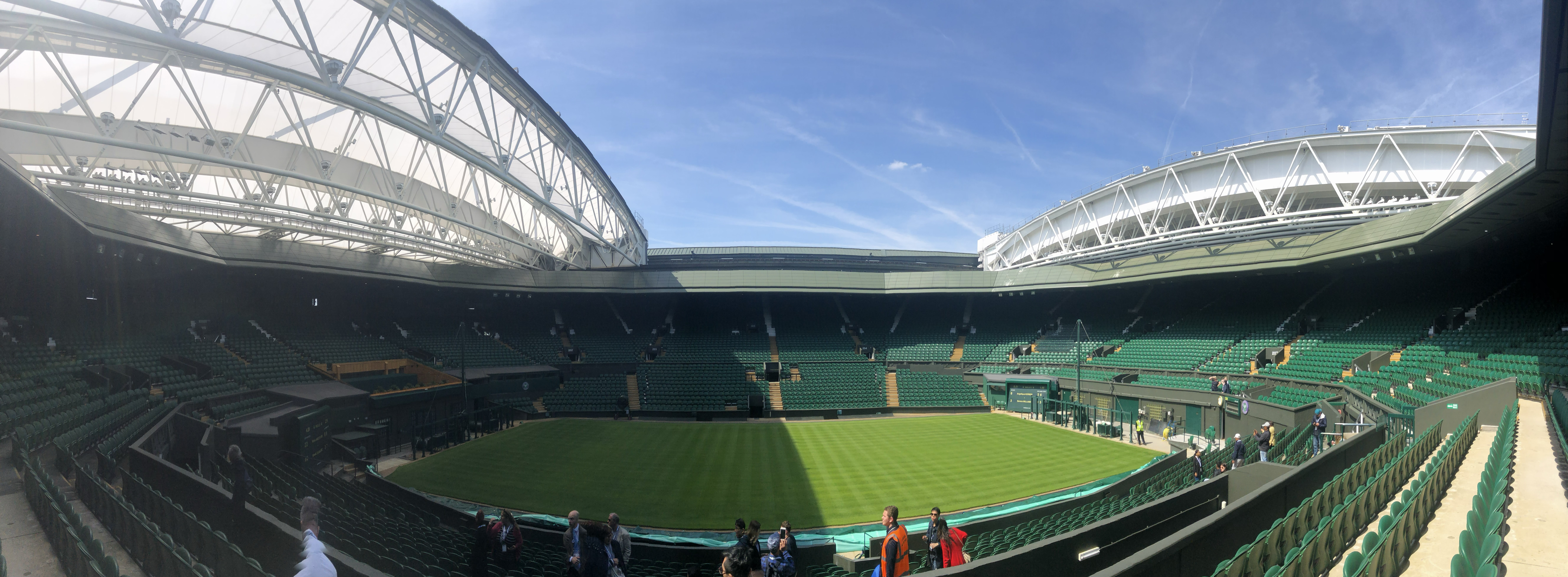
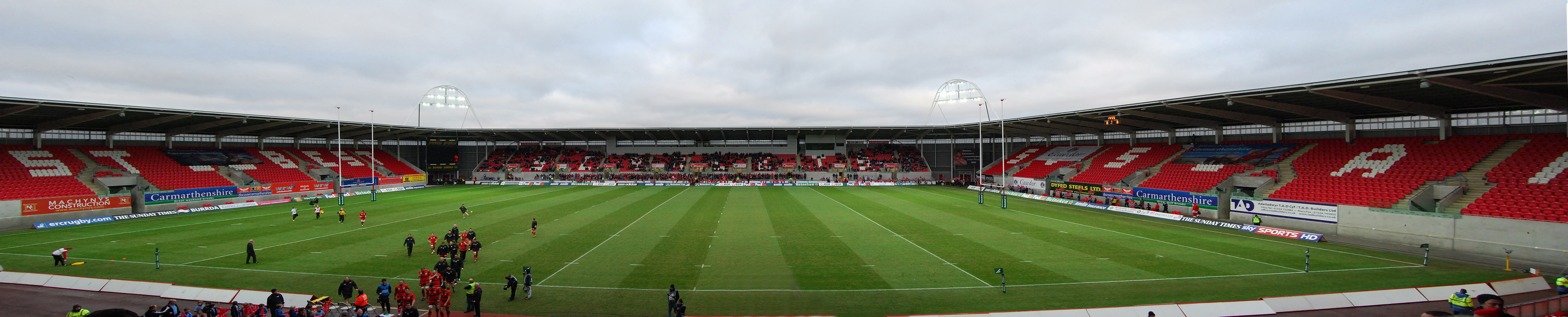
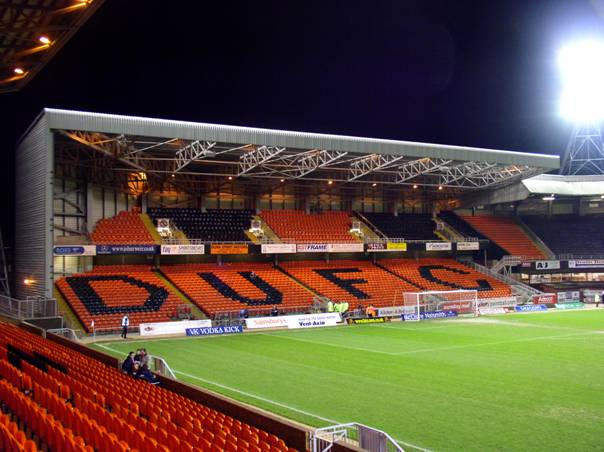
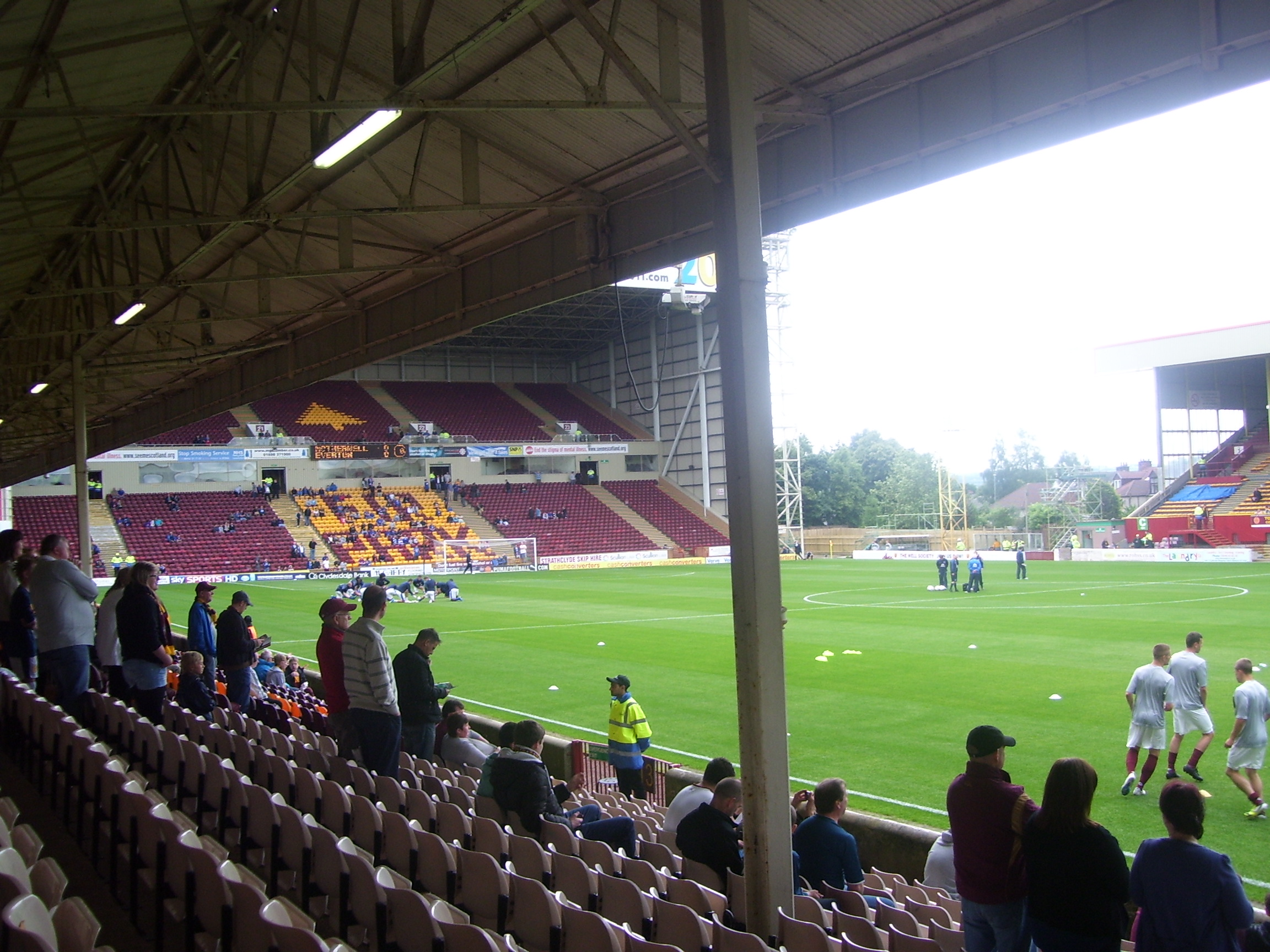
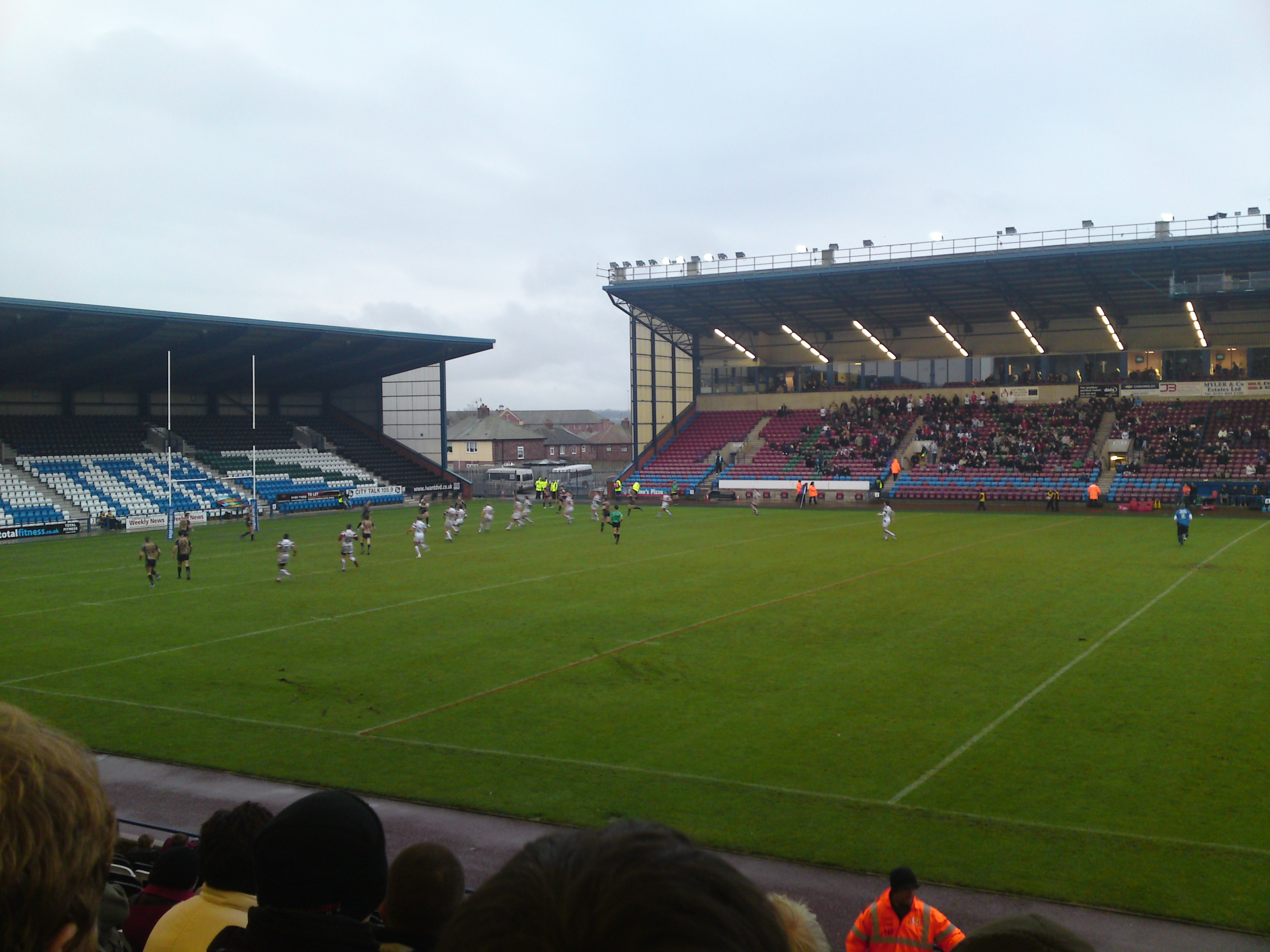
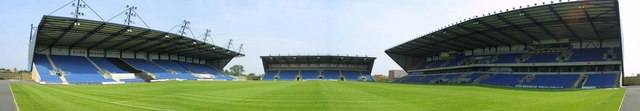
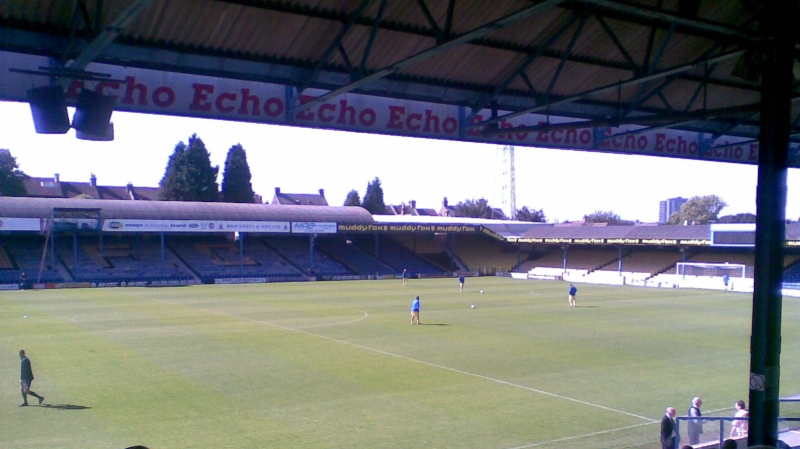
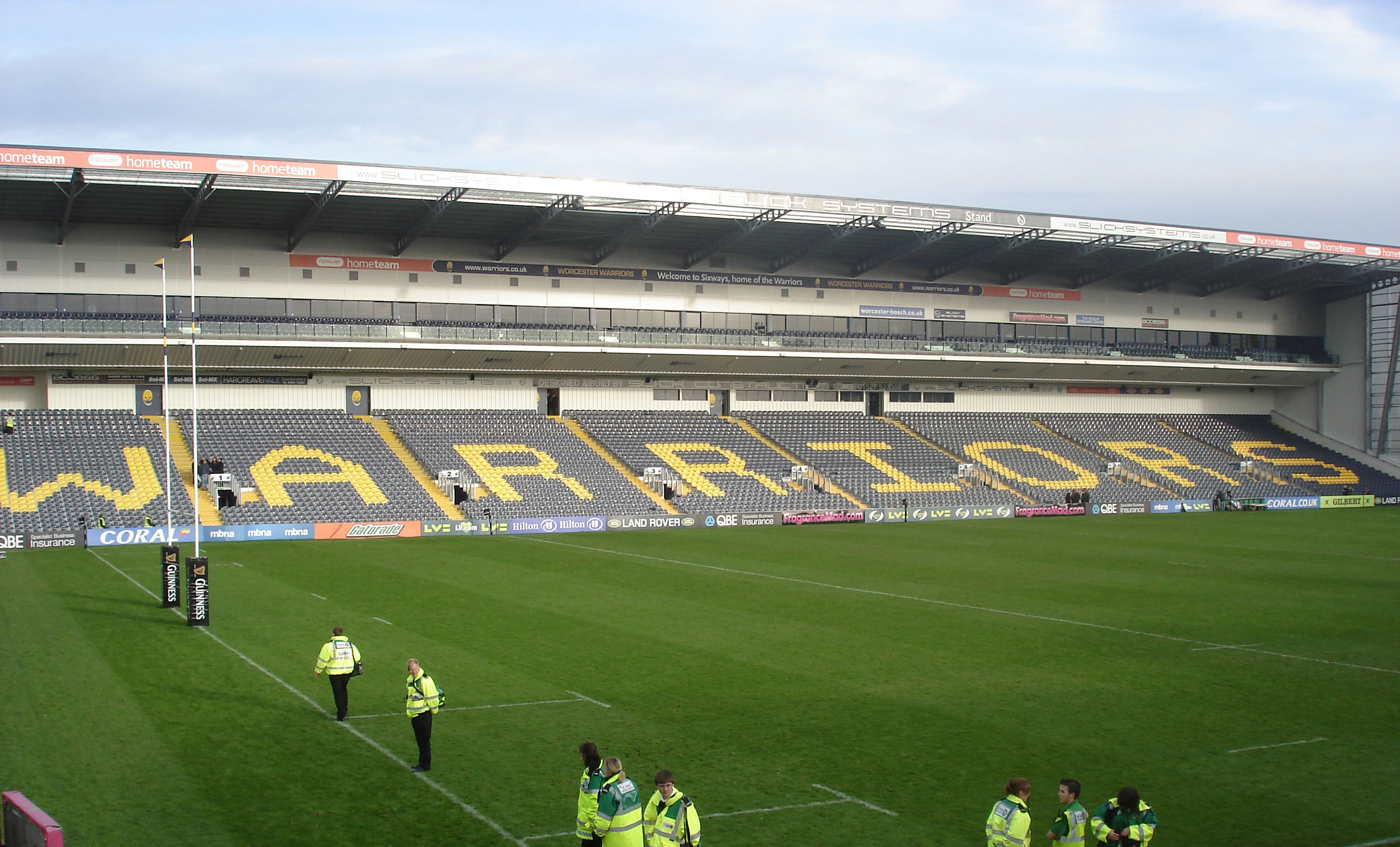
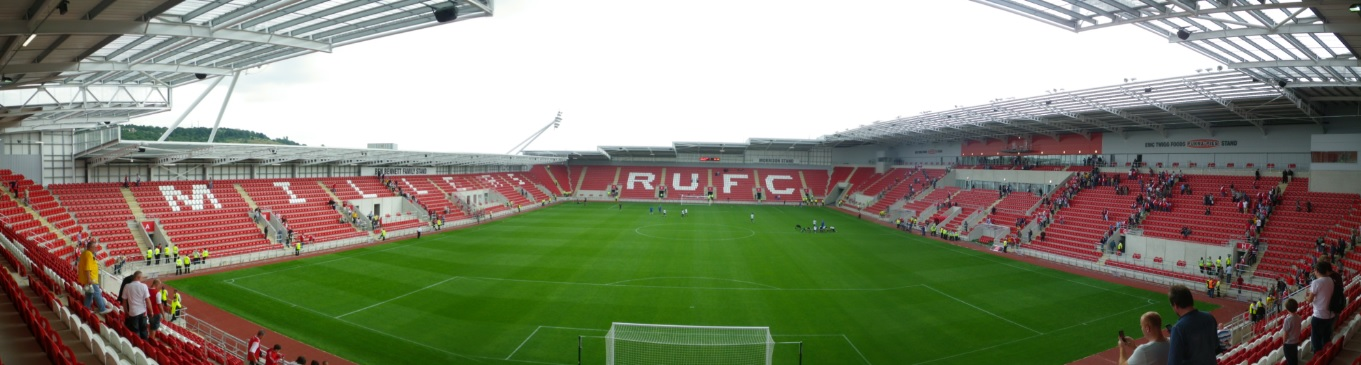
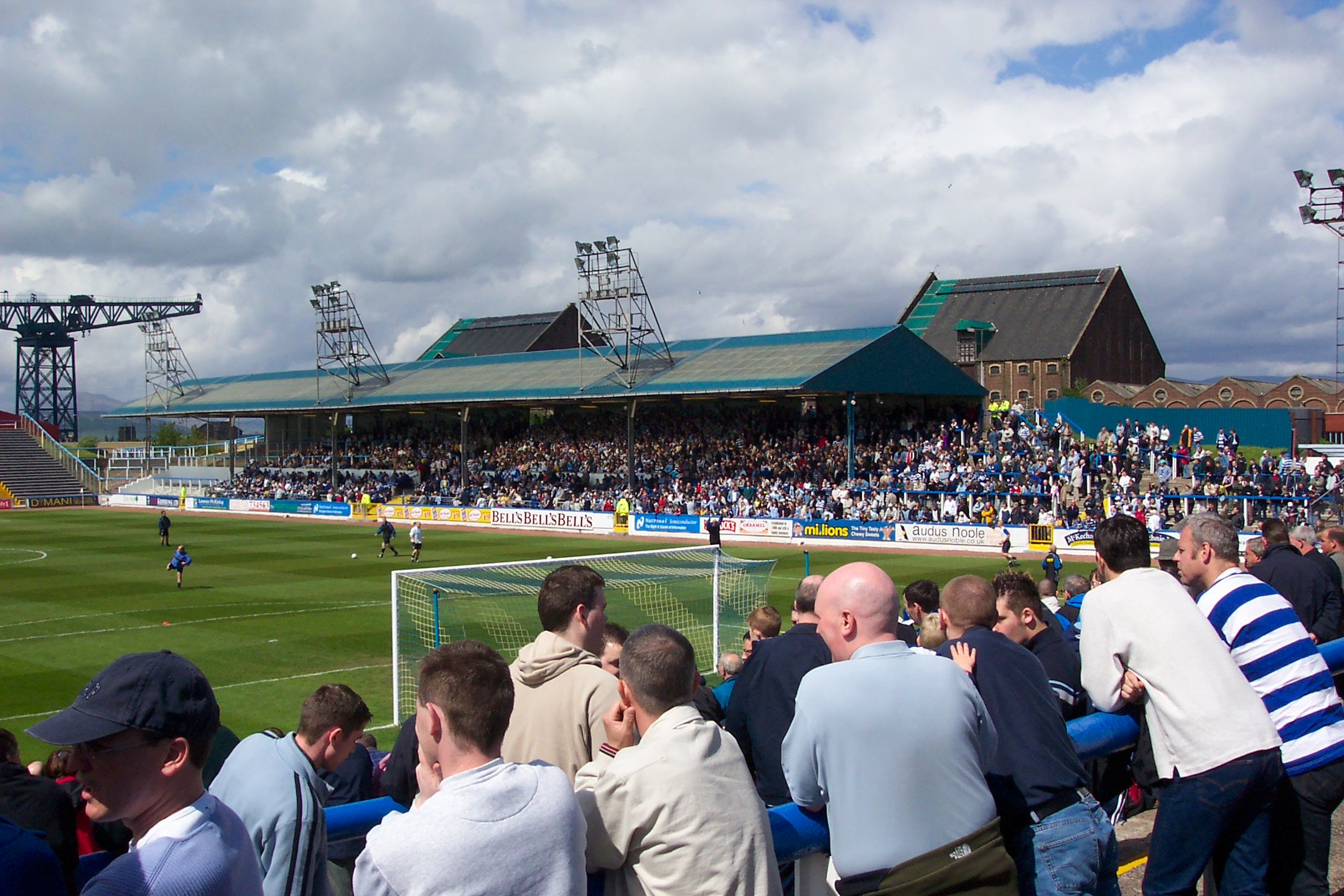
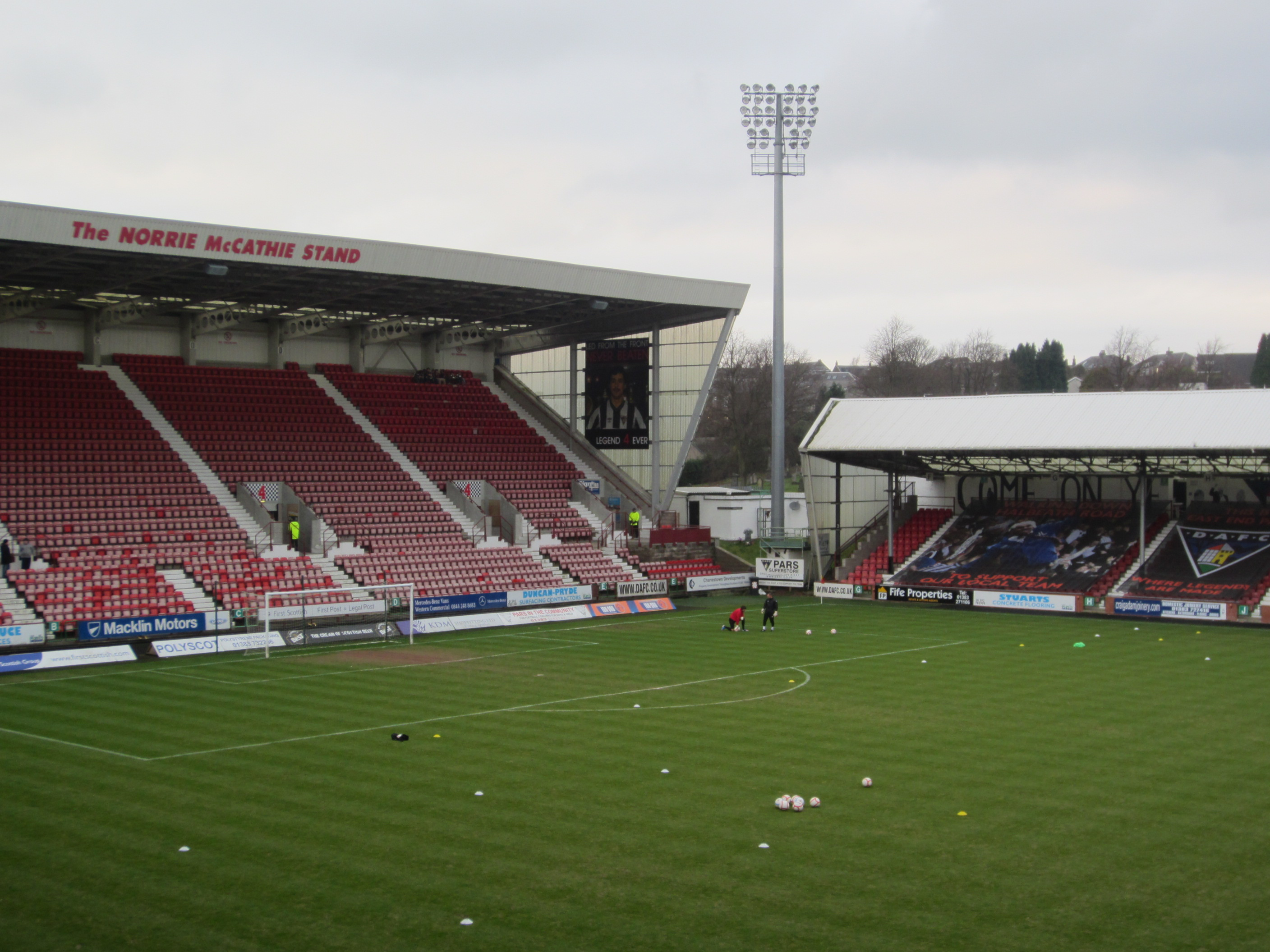
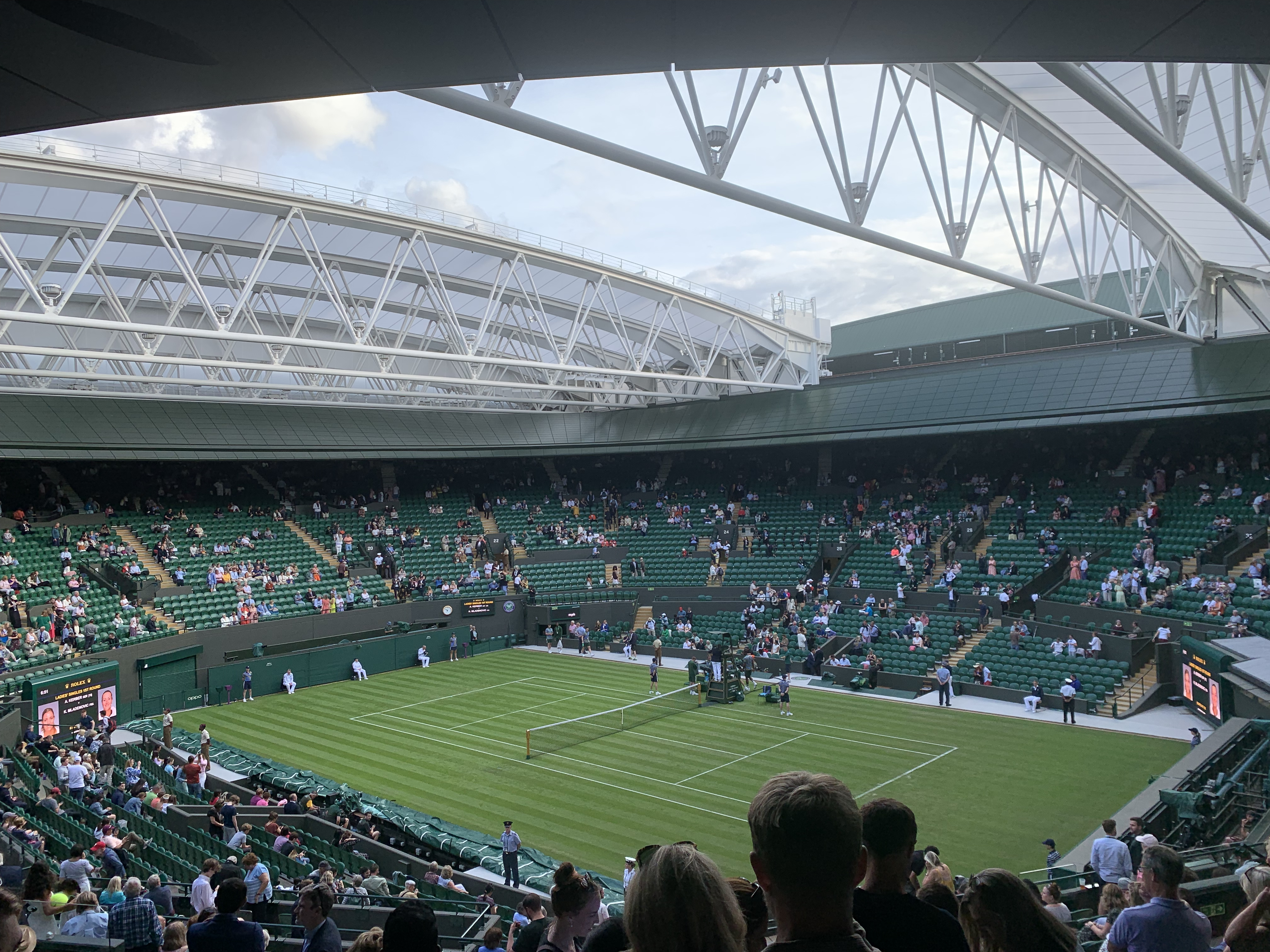
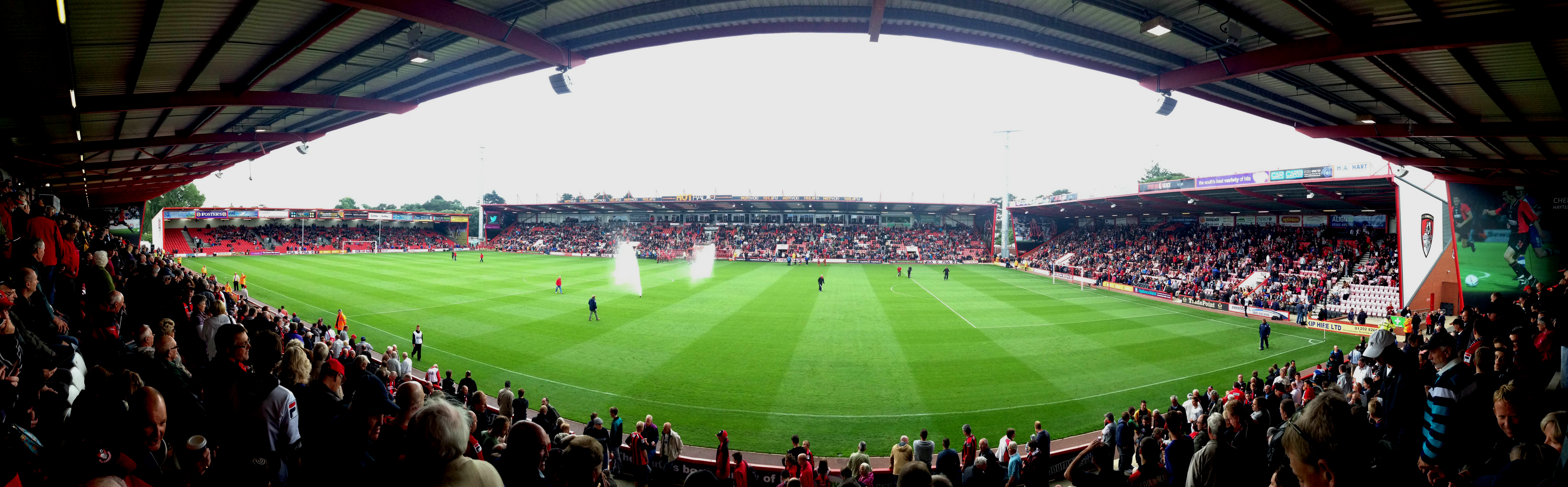
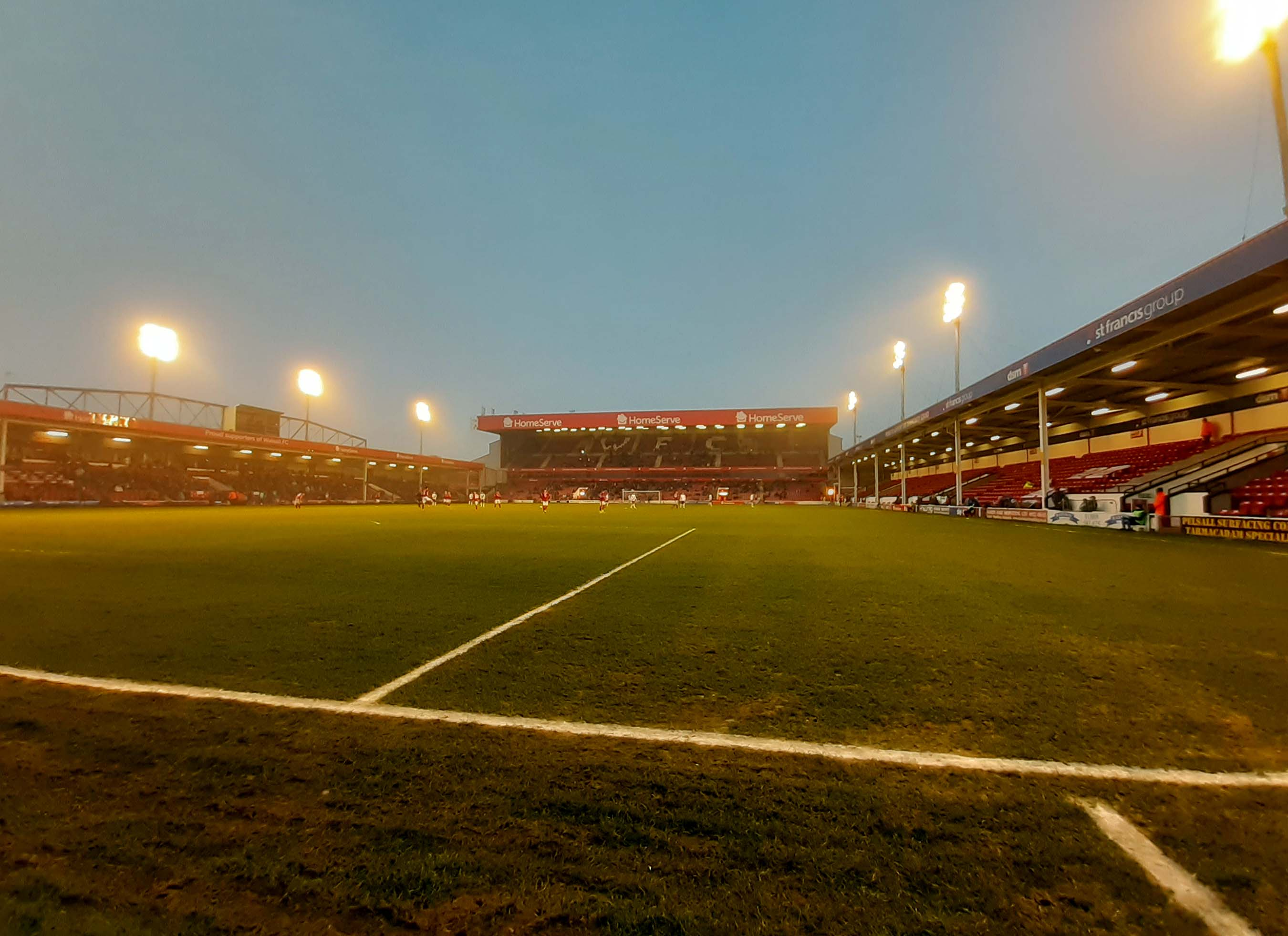
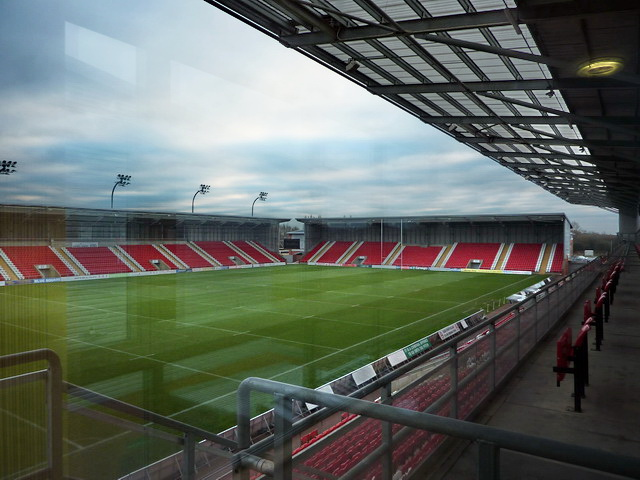
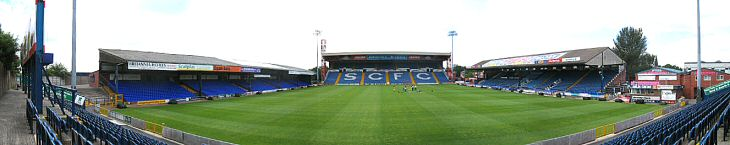
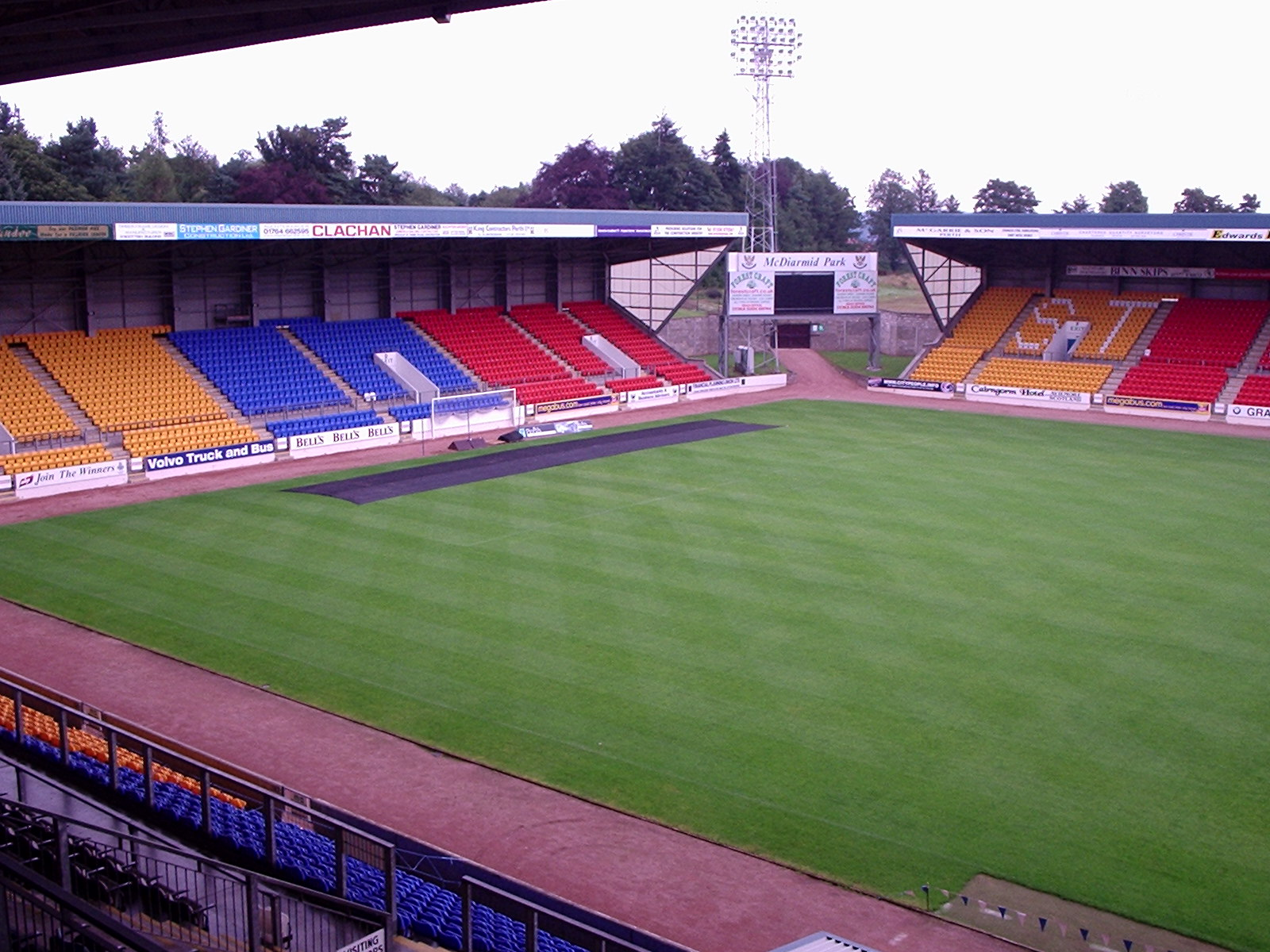
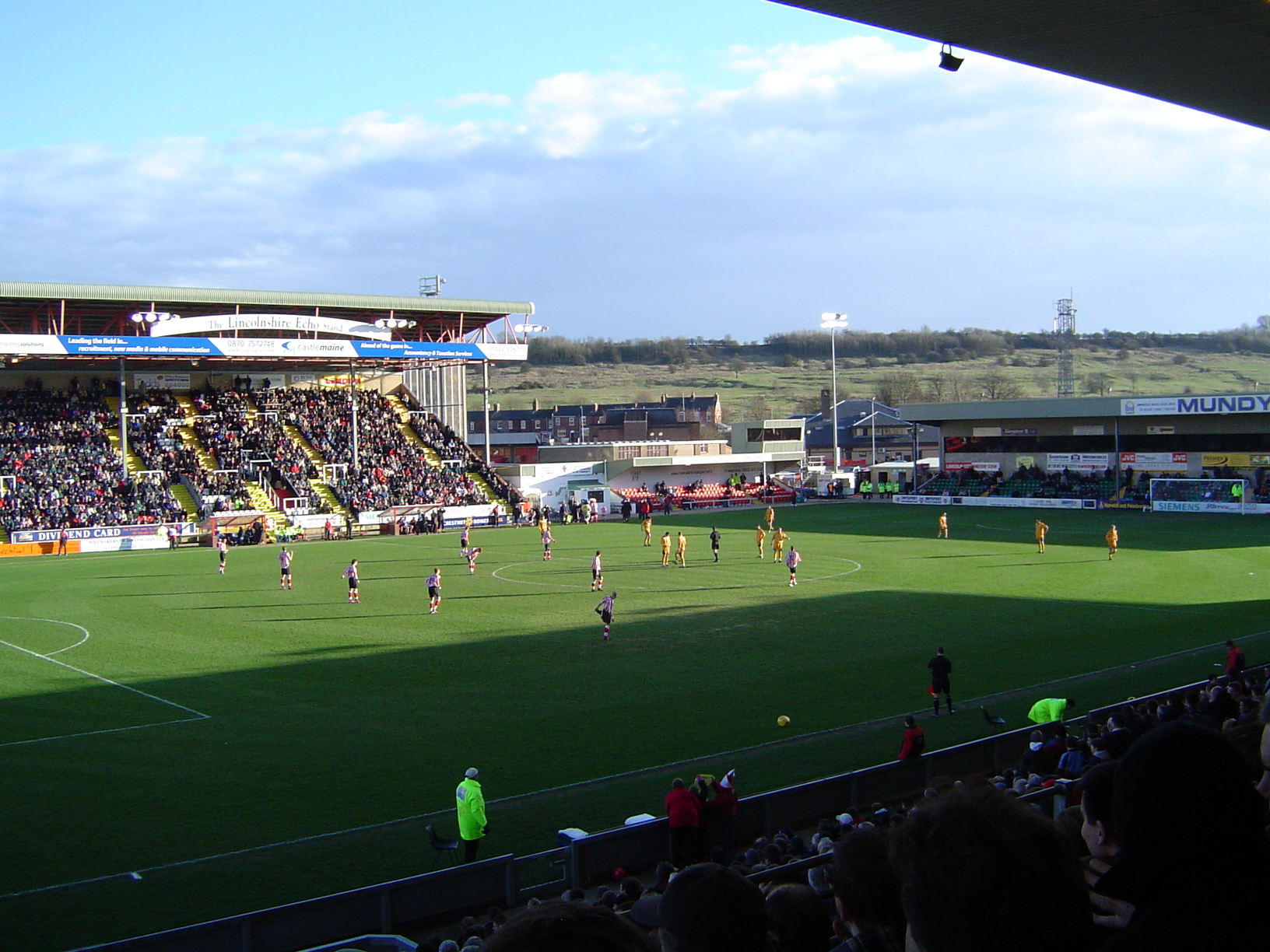
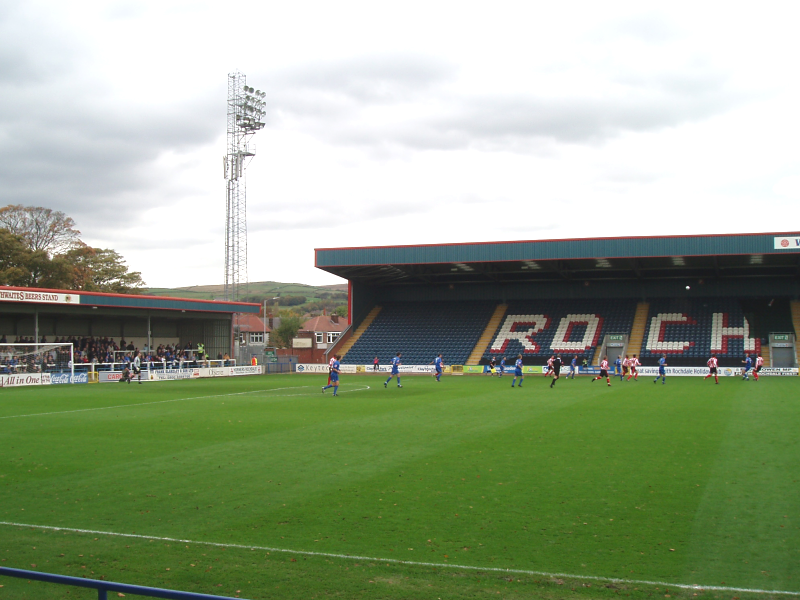
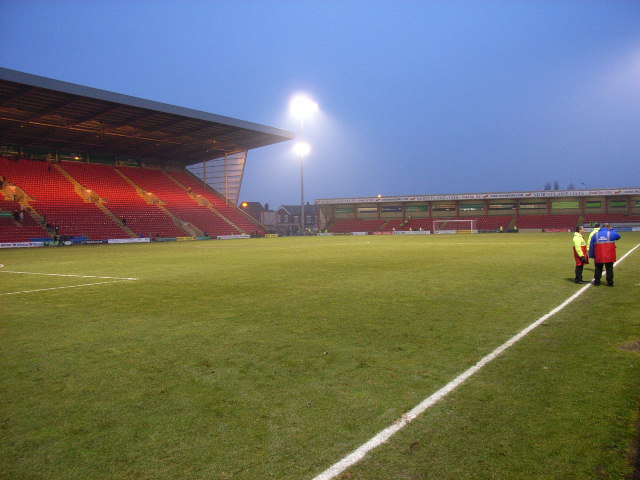
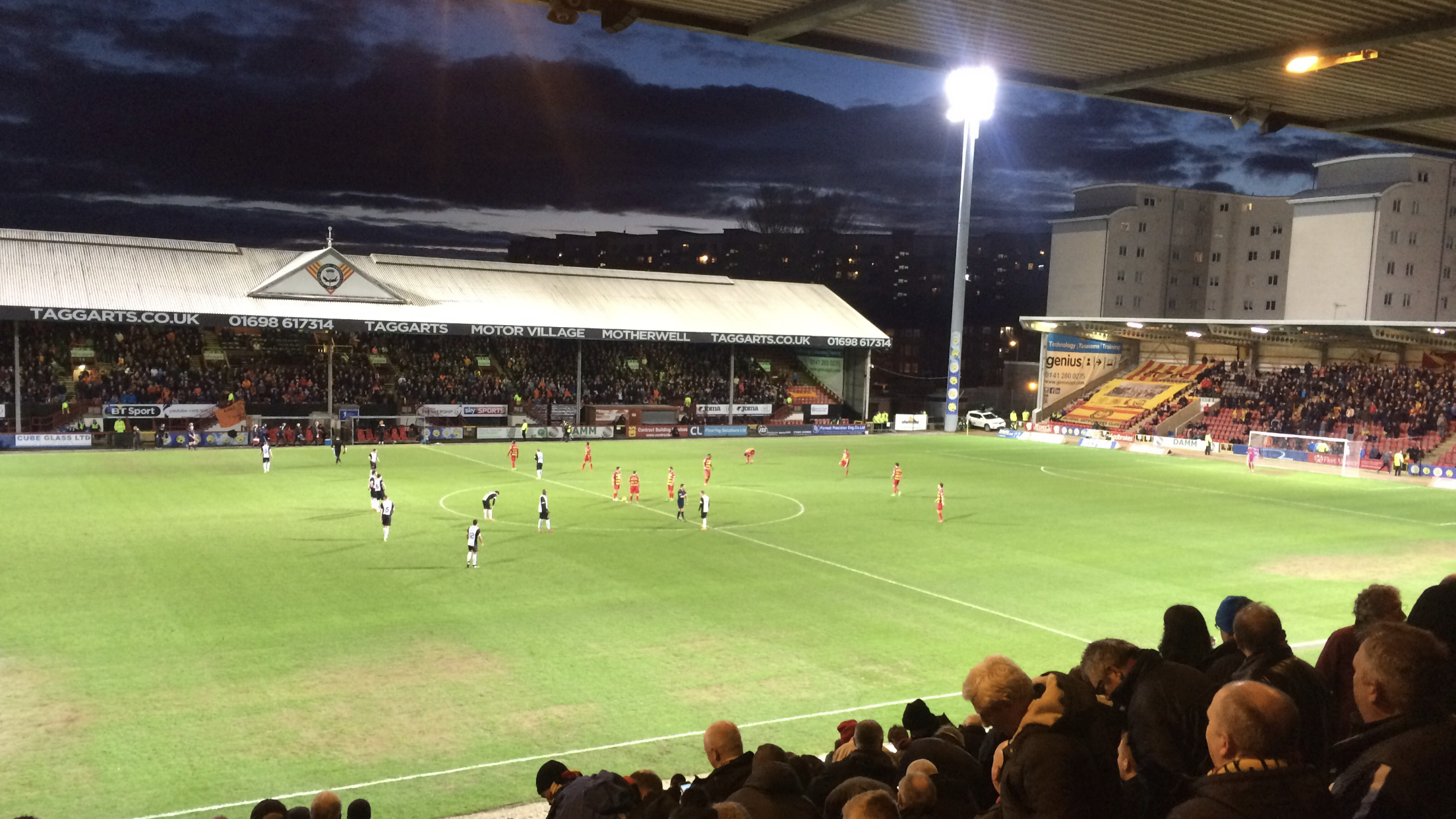
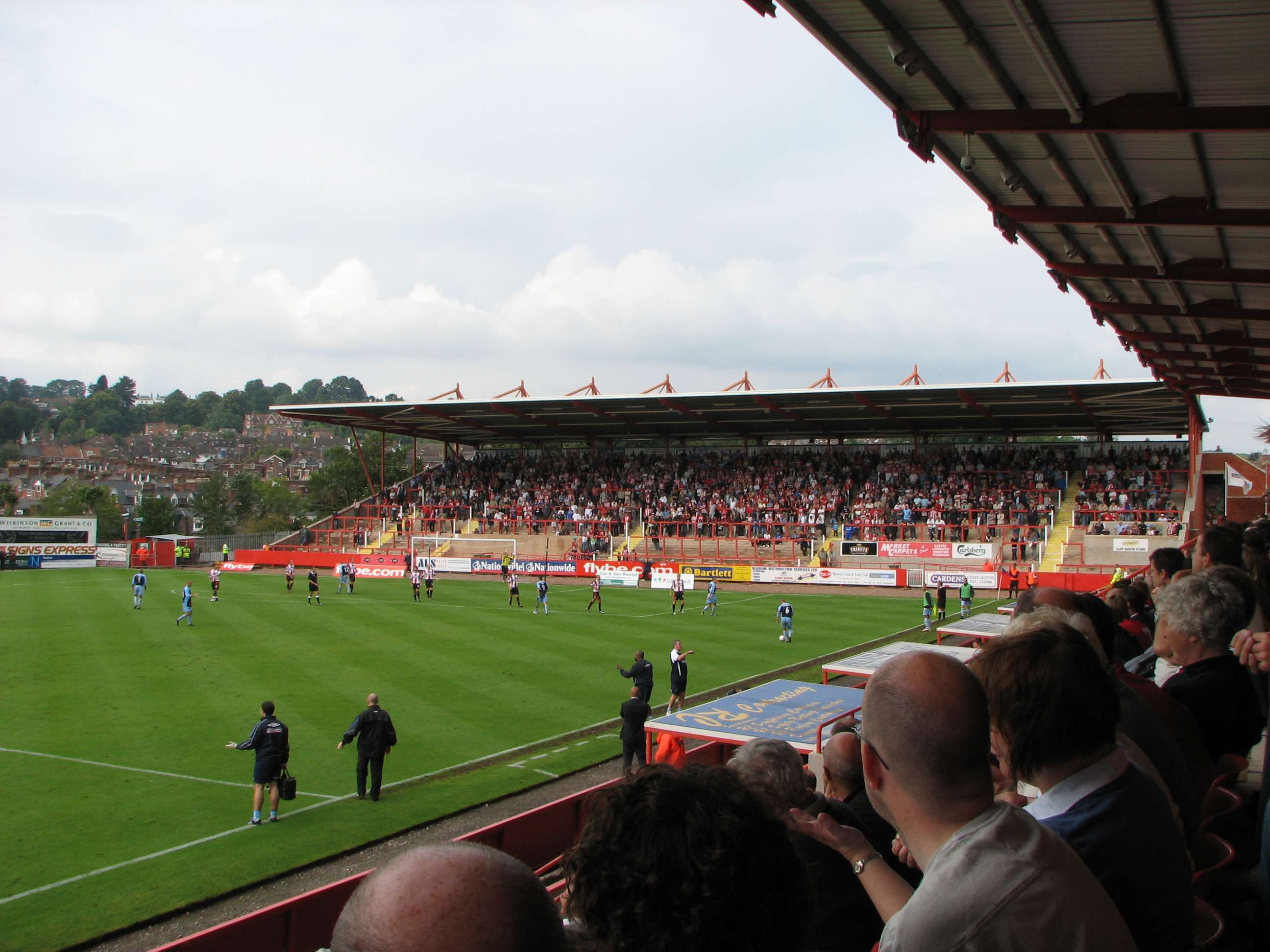
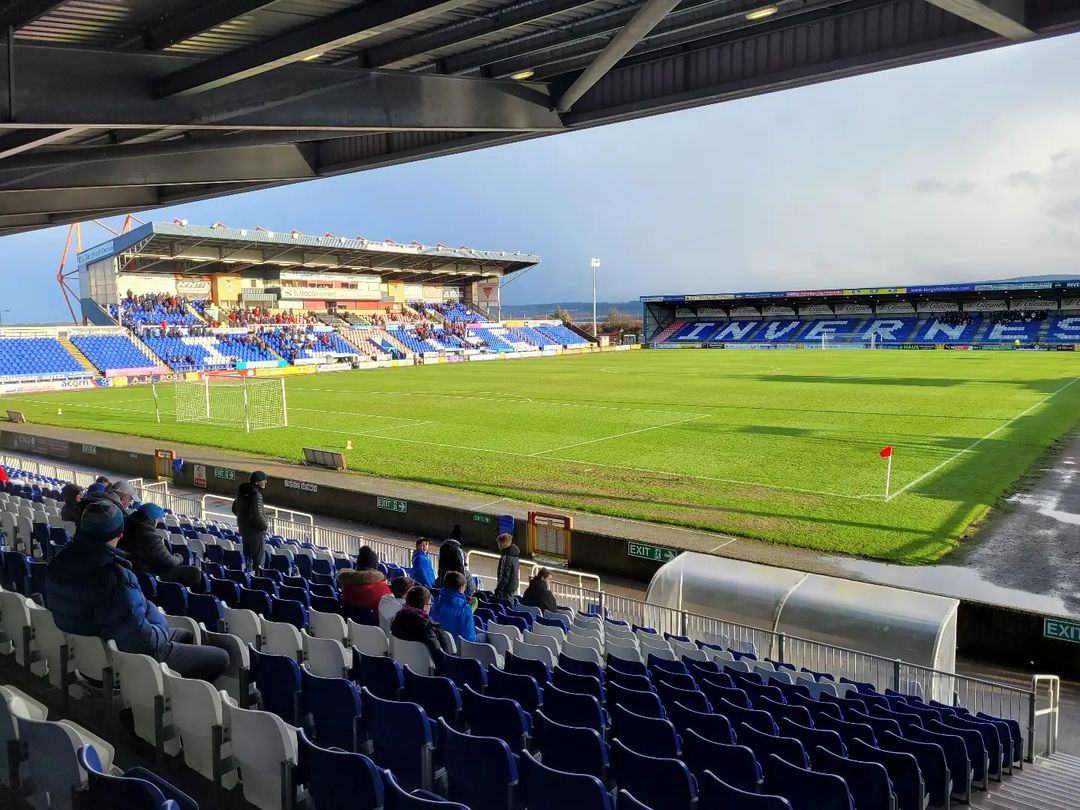
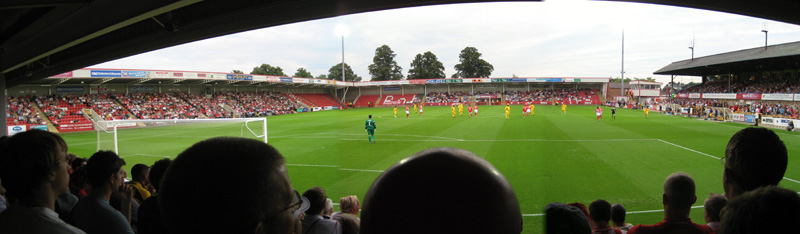
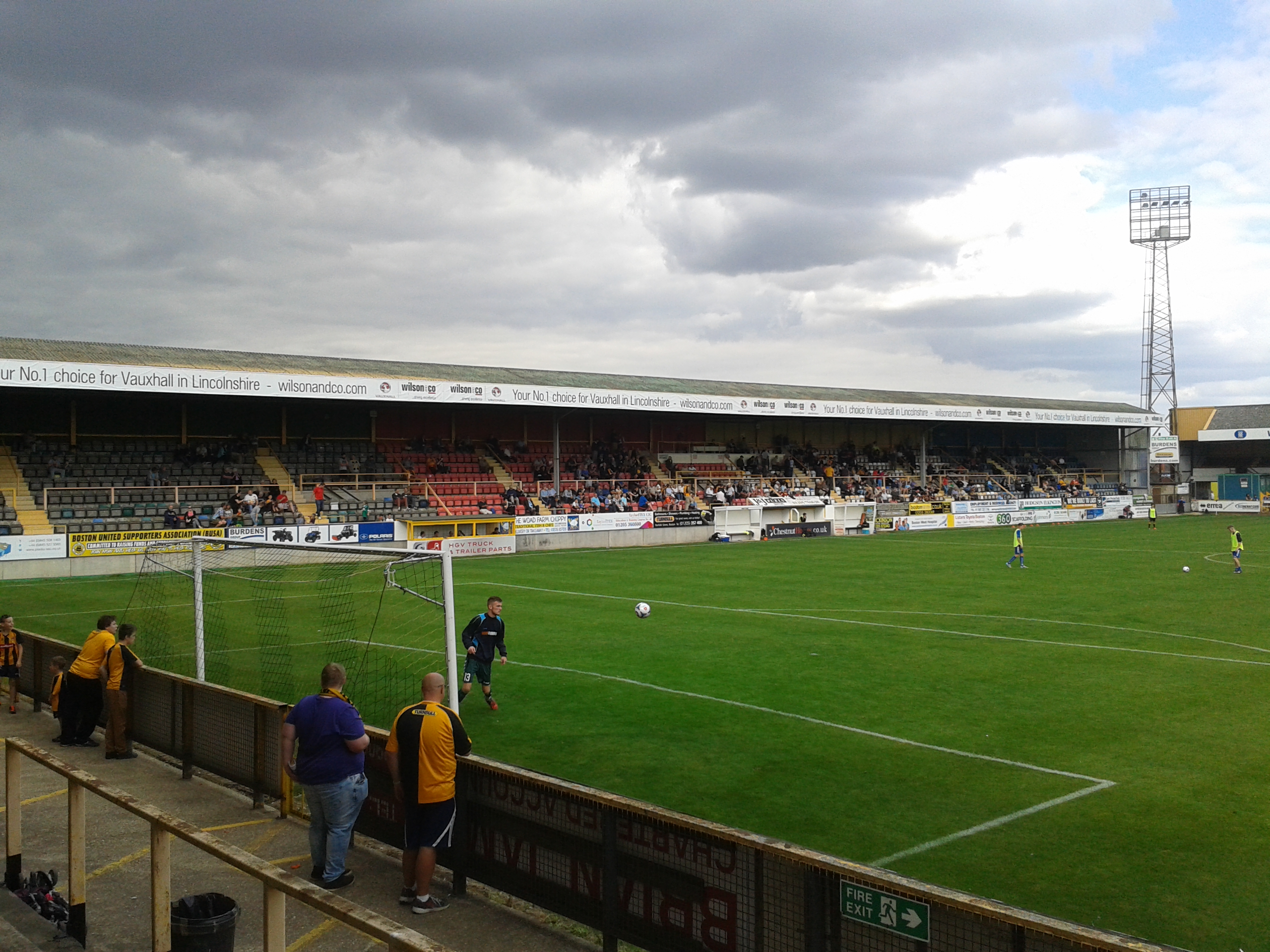
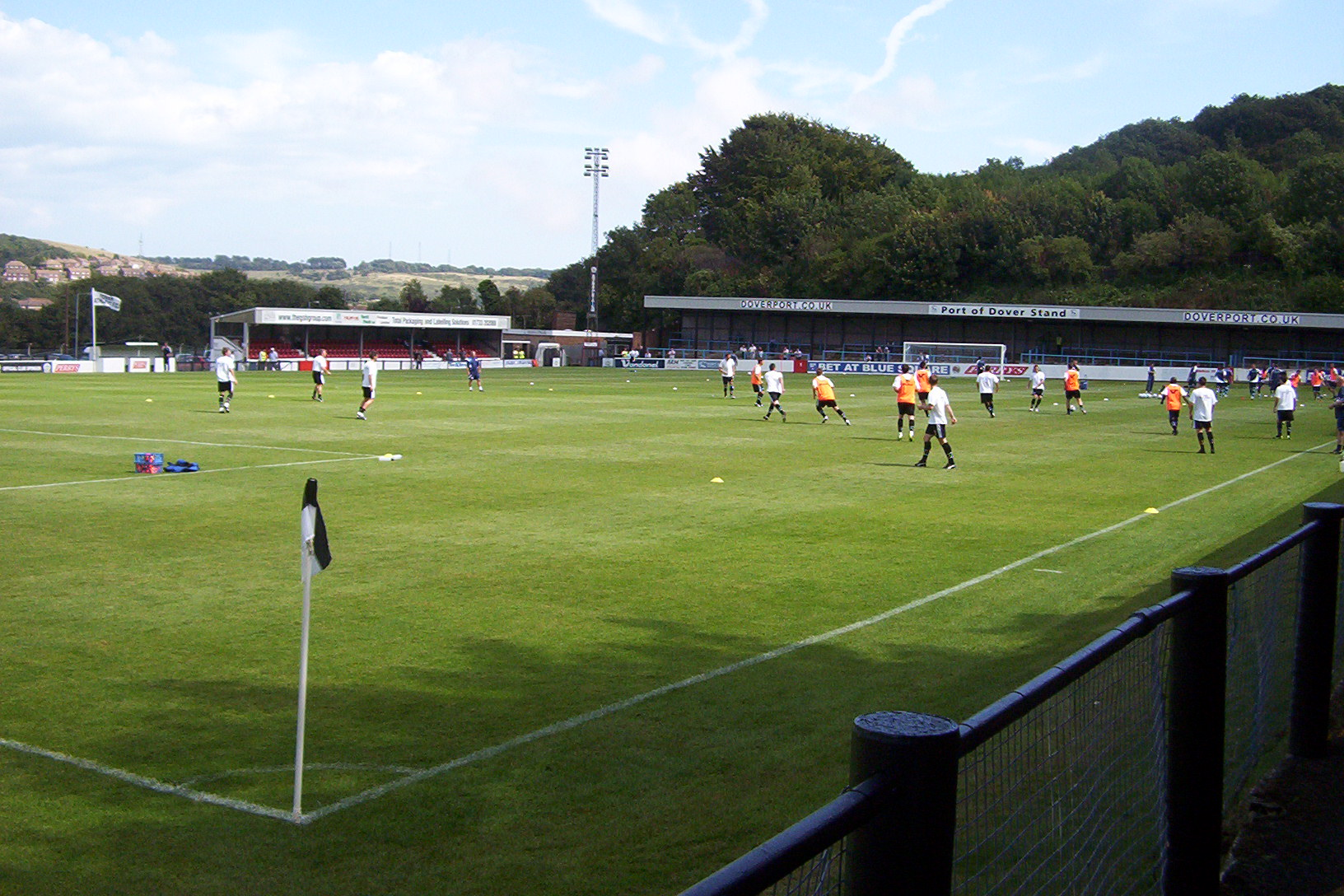
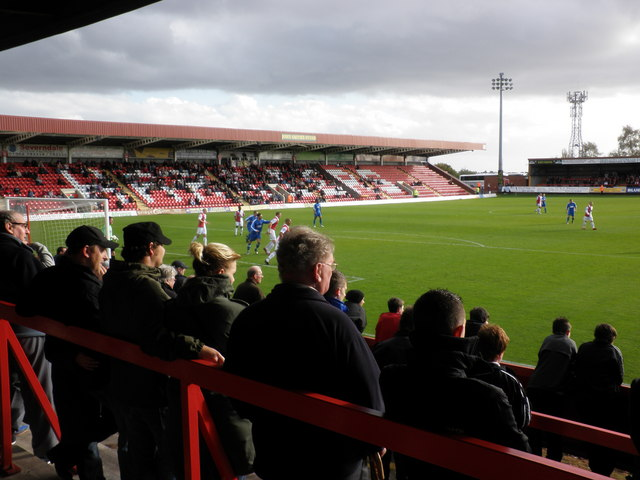
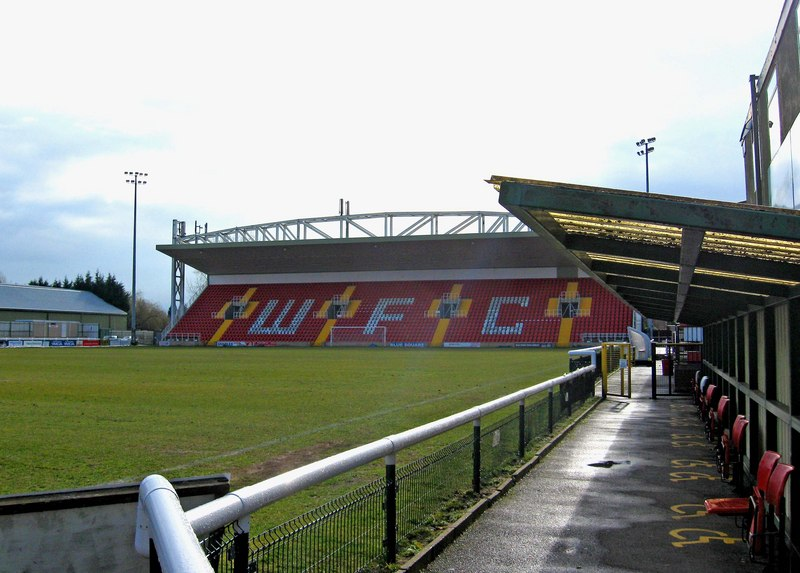
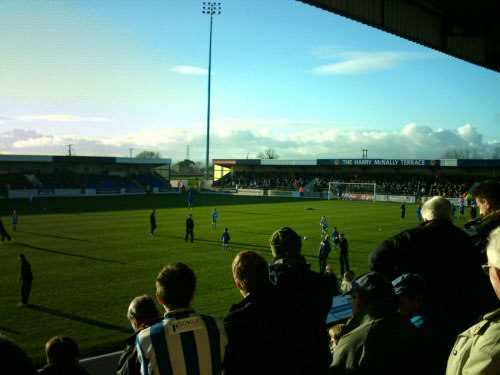
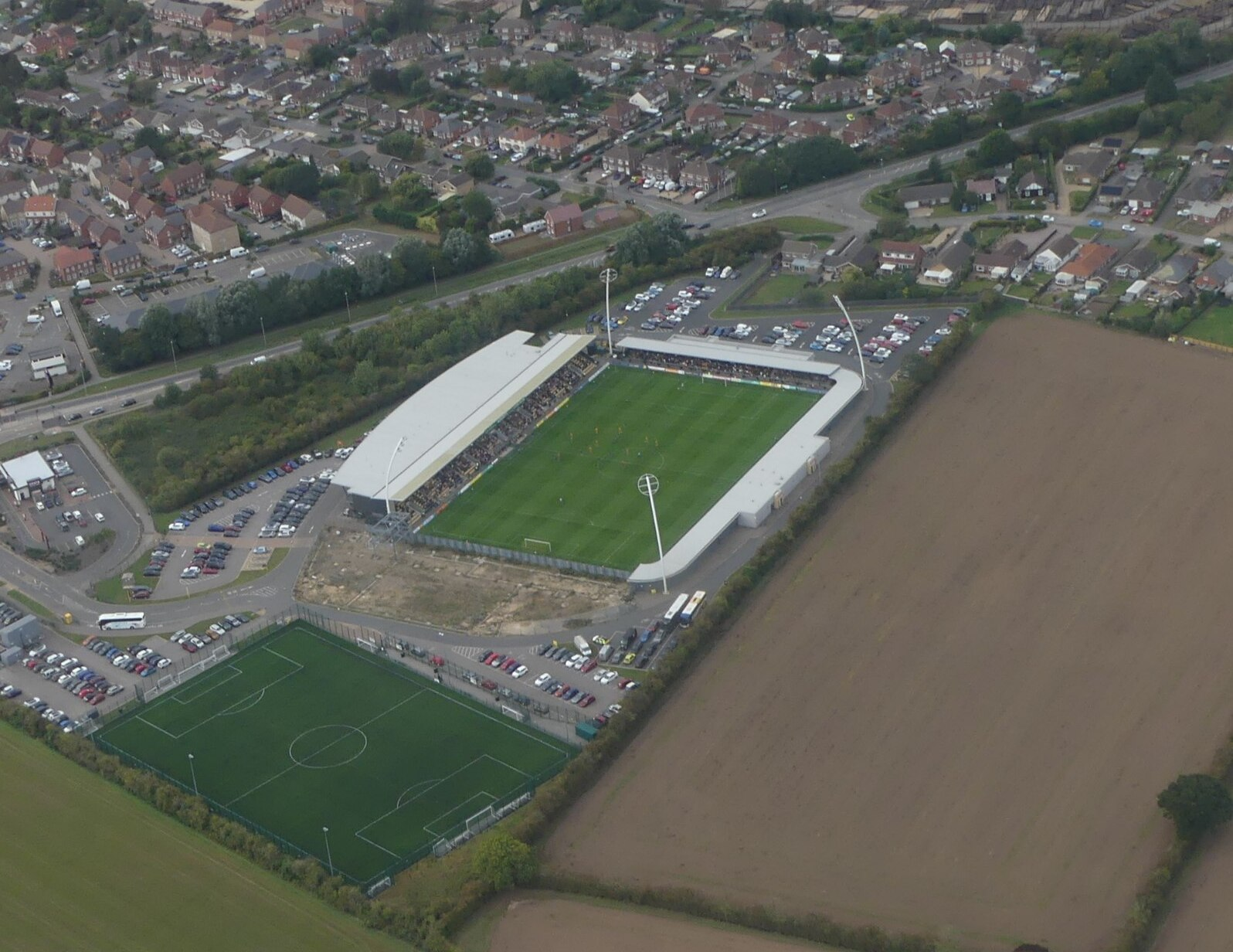
1	Wembley Stadium	90,000	London	England	England national football team	Association football, rugby league, rugby union, Gaelic football & hurling, American football, boxing, professional wrestling
2	Twickenham Stadium	82,000	London	England	England national rugby union team	Rugby union, American football
3	Old Trafford	74,197	Greater Manchester	England	Manchester United	Association football, rugby league
4	Principality Stadium	73,931	Cardiff	Wales	Wales national rugby union team	Rugby union, rugby league, association football, boxing, professional wrestling
5	Murrayfield Stadium	67,144	Edinburgh	Scotland	Scotland national rugby union team Edinburgh Rugby	Rugby union, rugby league
6	Tottenham Hotspur Stadium	62,850	London	England	Tottenham Hotspur	Association football, American football, boxing, rugby union, rugby league
7	London Stadium	62,500	London	England	West Ham United; British Athletics	Association football, athletics, rugby league, rugby union, baseball
8	Etihad Stadium	61,470	Manchester	England	Manchester City	Association football
9	Anfield	61,276	Liverpool	England	Liverpool	Association football
10	Emirates Stadium	60,704	London	England	Arsenal	Association football
11	Celtic Park	60,411	Glasgow	Scotland	Celtic	Association football
12	Hill Dickinson Stadium	52,888	Liverpool	England	Everton	Association football
13	St James' Park	52,305	Newcastle upon Tyne	England	Newcastle United	Association football, rugby league, rugby union
14	Hampden Park	51,866	Glasgow	Scotland	Scotland national football team Queen's Park	Association football
15	Ibrox Stadium	51,700	Glasgow	Scotland	Rangers	Association football
16	Stadium of Light	49,000	Sunderland	England	Sunderland	Association football
17	Villa Park	42,657	Birmingham	England	Aston Villa	Association football
18	Stamford Bridge	40,173	London	England	Chelsea	Association football
19	Hillsborough Stadium	39,732	Sheffield	England	Sheffield Wednesday	Association football
20	Goodison Park	39,414	Liverpool	England	Everton Women	Association football
21	Elland Road	37,608	Leeds	England	Leeds United	Association football, rugby league
22	Riverside Stadium	34,742	Middlesbrough	England	Middlesbrough	Association football
23	Pride Park Stadium	33,597	Derby	England	Derby County	Association football
24	Cardiff City Stadium	33,280	Cardiff	Wales	Cardiff City; Wales national football team	Association football
25	Bramall Lane	32,702	Sheffield	England	Sheffield United	Association football
26	St Mary's Stadium	32,689	Southampton	England	Southampton	Association football
27	Coventry Building Society Arena	32,609	Coventry	England	Coventry City	Association football
28	King Power Stadium	32,500	Leicester	England	Leicester City	Association football
29	Molineux Stadium	32,050	Wolverhampton	England	Wolverhampton Wanderers	Association football
30	Falmer Stadium	31,876	Brighton	England	Brighton & Hove Albion	Association football
31	Ewood Park	31,367	Blackburn	England	Blackburn Rovers	Association football
32	Lord's	31,100	London	England	Marylebone Cricket Club; Middlesex County Cricket Club	Cricket
33	City Ground	31,042	Nottingham	England	Nottingham Forest	Association football
34	Stadium MK	30,500	Milton Keynes	England	Milton Keynes Dons	Association football
35	Bet365 Stadium	30,183	Stoke-on-Trent	England	Stoke City	Association football
36	Portman Road	30,056	Ipswich	England	Ipswich Town	Association football
37	St Andrew's	29,409	Birmingham	England	Birmingham City	Association football
38	Toughsheet Community Stadium	28,723	Bolton	England	Bolton Wanderers	Association football, rugby league
39	The Oval	27,500	London	England	Surrey County Cricket Club	Cricket
40	Carrow Road	27,244	Norwich	England	Norwich City	Association football
41	The Valley	27,111	London	England	Charlton Athletic	Association football
42	Ashton Gate	27,000	Bristol	England	Bristol City; Bristol Rugby	Association football, rugby union
43	The Hawthorns	26,688	West Bromwich	England	West Bromwich Albion	Association football
44	Selhurst Park	26,309	London	England	Crystal Palace	Association football
45	Odsal Stadium	26,019	Bradford	England	Bradford Bulls	Rugby league, stock car racing
46	Old Trafford Cricket Ground	26,000	Trafford	England	Lancashire County Cricket Club	Cricket
47	Welford Road Stadium	25,849	Leicester	England	Leicester Tigers	Rugby union
48	Craven Cottage	29,600	London	England	Fulham	Association football
49	MKM Stadium	25,586	Kingston upon Hull	England	Hull City; Hull F.C.	Association football, rugby
50	Brick Community Stadium	25,138	Wigan	England	Wigan Warriors; Wigan Athletic	Rugby league, association football
51	Valley Parade	25,136	Bradford	England	Bradford City	Association football
52	The Darlington Arena	25,000	Darlington	England	Darlington Mowden Park R.F.C.	Rugby union
53	Edgbaston Cricket Ground	25,000	Birmingham	England	Warwickshire County Cricket Club	Cricket
54	Healy Park	25,000	Omagh	Northern Ireland	Omagh St. Enda's; Tyrone GAA	Gaelic football, hurling, camogie
55	Kirklees Stadium	24,500	Huddersfield	England	Huddersfield Town; Huddersfield Giants	Association football, rugby league
56	Madejski Stadium	24,161	Reading	England	Reading	Association football
57	Deepdale	23,408	Preston	England	Preston North End	Association football
58	Oakwell	23,009	Barnsley	England	Barnsley	Association football
59	Turf Moor	22,546	Burnley	England	Burnley	Association football
60	Vicarage Road	21,977	Watford	England	Watford	Association football
61	Headingley Rugby Stadium	21,050	Leeds	England	Leeds Rhinos	Rugby league, rugby union
62	Swansea.com Stadium	20,991	Swansea	Wales	Swansea City; Ospreys	Association football, rugby union
63	Fratton Park	20,899	Portsmouth	England	Portsmouth	Association football
64	Pittodrie Stadium	20,866	Aberdeen	Scotland	Aberdeen	Association football
65	Easter Road	20,421	Edinburgh	Scotland	Hibernian	Association football
66	Meadow Lane	20,211	Nottingham	England	Notts County	Association football
67	The Den	20,146	London	England	Millwall	Association football
68	Brewster Park	20,000	Enniskillen	Northern Ireland	Fermanagh GAA	Gaelic football, hurling, camogie
69	Páirc Esler	20,000	Newry	Northern Ireland	Down GAA	Gaelic football, hurling, camogie
70	Tynecastle Park	19,852	Edinburgh	Scotland	Heart of Midlothian	Association football
71	Home Park	19,500	Plymouth	England	Plymouth Argyle	Association football
72	Vale Park	19,052	Stoke-on-Trent	England	Port Vale	Association football
73	Windsor Park	18,614	Belfast	Northern Ireland	Northern Ireland national football team, Linfield	Association football
74	Celtic Park	18,500	Derry	Northern Ireland	Derry GAA	Gaelic football, hurling, camogie
75	Headingley Cricket Ground	18,350	Leeds	England	Yorkshire County Cricket Club	Cricket
76	Loftus Road	18,200	London	England	Queens Park Rangers	Association football
77	Ravenhill Stadium	18,196	Belfast	Northern Ireland	Ulster Rugby	Rugby union
78	Athletic Grounds	18,000	Armagh	Northern Ireland	Armagh GAA	Gaelic football, hurling, camogie
79	Totally Wicked Stadium	18,000	St. Helens	England	St Helens R.F.C., St. Helens Town	Rugby league
80	Rugby Park	15,003	Kilmarnock	Scotland	Kilmarnock	Association football
81	Trent Bridge	17,500	West Bridgford	England	Nottinghamshire County Cricket Club	Cricket
82	Brentford Community Stadium	17,250	London	England	Brentford, London Irish	Association football, rugby union
83	Prenton Park	16,789	Birkenhead	England	Tranmere Rovers	Association football
84	Brunton Park	16,651	Carlisle	England	Carlisle United	Association football
85	Kingsholm Stadium	16,500	Gloucester	England	Gloucester Rugby	Rugby union
86	Bloomfield Road	16,220	Blackpool	England	Blackpool	Association football
87	County Cricket Ground	16,000	Bristol	England	Gloucestershire County Cricket Club	Cricket
88	County Ground	15,728	Swindon	England	Swindon Town	Association football
89	Sophia Gardens	15,643	Cardiff	Wales	Glamorgan County Cricket Club	Cricket
90	Sandy Park	15,600	Exeter	England	Exeter Chiefs	Rugby union
91	Crystal Palace National Sports Centre	15,500	London	England	London Grand Prix, London Olympians	Athletics, American football
92	Racecourse Ground	15,500	Wrexham	Wales	Wrexham, North Wales Crusaders	Association football, rugby league
93	London Road Stadium	13,511	Peterborough	England	Peterborough United	Association football
94	Franklin's Gardens	15,249	Northampton	England	Northampton Saints	Rugby union
95	Eco-Power Stadium	15,231	Doncaster	England	Doncaster Rovers, Doncaster	Association football, rugby league
96	Halliwell Jones Stadium	15,200	Warrington	England	Warrington Wolves	Rugby league
97	Rose Bowl	15,000	West End	England	Hampshire County Cricket Club	Cricket
98	Centre Court	15,000	London	England	The Championships, Wimbledon	Tennis
99	Riverside Ground	15,000	Chester-le-Street	England	Durham County Cricket Club	Cricket
100	St Lawrence Ground	15,000	Canterbury	England	Kent County Cricket Club, Kent Spitfires	Cricket
101	The Oval	15,000	Belfast	Northern Ireland	Glentoran	Association football
102	Parc y Scarlets	14,870	Llanelli	Wales	Scarlets, Llanelli RFC, Llanelli A.F.C.*	Rugby union, association football
103	Twickenham Stoop	14,816	London	England	Harlequin, London Broncos	Rugby union
104	Recreation Ground	14,500	Bath	England	Bath Rugby	Rugby union
105	Tannadice Park	14,223	Dundee	Scotland	Dundee United	Association football
106	The Shay	14,061	Halifax	England	FC Halifax Town, Halifax	Association football, rugby league
107	Fir Park	13,677	Motherwell	Scotland	Motherwell	Association football
108	Boundary Park	13,500	Oldham	England	Oldham Athletic	Association football
109	DCBL Stadium	13,350	Widnes	England	Widnes Vikings	Rugby league
110	Alexander Stadium	12,700	Birmingham	England	Birchfield Harriers, British Athletics	Athletics
111	Cardiff Arms Park	12,500	Cardiff	Wales	Cardiff RFC	Rugby union
112	Kassam Stadium	12,500	Oxford	England	Oxford United	Association football, rugby union
113	Memorial Stadium	12,500	Bristol	England	Bristol Rovers	Association football
114	Roots Hall	12,392	Southend-on-Sea	England	Southend United	Association football
115	Craven Park	12,225	Kingston upon Hull	England	Hull Kingston Rovers	Rugby league
116	Sixways Stadium	12,024	Worcester	England	Worcester Warriors	Rugby union
117	New York Stadium	12,021	Rotherham	England	Rotherham United	Association football
118	Belle Vue	12,000	Wakefield	England	Wakefield Trinity Wildcats	Rugby league
119	Brewery Field	12,000	Bridgend	Wales	Bridgend Ravens, Bridgend Town	Rugby union, association football
120	Grace Road	12,000	Leicester	England	Leicestershire County Cricket Club	Cricket
121	Salford City Stadium	12,000	Salford	England	Salford City Reds, Sale Sharks	Rugby league, rugby union
122	Gateshead International Stadium	11,800	Gateshead	England	Gateshead, Gateshead Senators	Athletics, association football, rugby league, American football
123	Dens Park	11,775	Dundee	Scotland	Dundee	Association football
124	The Jungle	11,750	Castleford	England	Castleford Tigers	Rugby league
125	Rodney Parade	11,676	Newport	Wales	Newport RFC, Dragons Newport County	Rugby union, association football
126	Gigg Lane	11,669	Bury	England	Bury	Association football
127	Cappielow	11,589	Greenock	Scotland	Greenock Morton	Association football
128	Priestfield Stadium	11,582	Gillingham	England	Gillingham	Association football
129	Kenilworth Road	11,500	Luton	England	Luton Town	Association football
130	North Marine Road	11,500	Scarborough	England	Scarborough Cricket Club, Yorkshire County Cricket Club*	Cricket
131	East End Park	11,480	Dunfermline	Scotland	Dunfermline Athletic	Association football
132	No. 1 Court	11,429	London	England	The Championships, Wimbledon	Tennis
133	Dean Court	11,329	Bournemouth	England	A.F.C. Bournemouth	Association football
134	Pallet-Track Bescot Stadium	11,300	Walsall	England	Walsall	Association football
135	The Progress With Unity Stadium	11,000	Leigh	England	Leigh Centurions	Rugby league
136	Edgeley Park	10,852	Stockport	England	Stockport County	Association football
137	McDiarmid Park	10,696	Perth	Scotland	St. Johnstone	Association football
138	Cwmbran Stadium	10,500	Cwmbran	Wales	Cwmbran Town	Athletics, association football
139	SMH Group Stadium	10,379	Chesterfield	England	Chesterfield	Association football
140	Sincil Bank	10,307	Lincoln	England	Lincoln City	Association football
141	Spotland Stadium	10,249	Rochdale	England	Rochdale, Rochdale Hornets	Association football, rugby league
142	Kingston Park	10,200	Newcastle upon Tyne	England	Newcastle Falcons, Newcastle Thunder, Newcastle United W.F.C.	Rugby union, rugby league, association football
143	Somerset Park	10,185	Ayr	Scotland	Ayr United	Association football
144	Alexandra Stadium	10,153	Crewe	England	Crewe Alexandra	Association football
145	Firhill Stadium	10,102	Glasgow	Scotland	Partick Thistle	Association football
146	Excelsior Stadium	10,101	Airdrie	Scotland	Airdrieonians	Association football
147	Adams Park	10,000	High Wycombe	England	Wycombe Wanderers,	Association football
148	Barnet Copthall	10,000	London	England	Saracens, Shaftesbury Barnet Harriers	Rugby union, athletics
149	County Cricket Ground	10,000	Beckenham, Greater London	England	Kent County Cricket Club*	Cricket
150	Derwent Park	10,000	Workington	England	Workington Town, Workington Comets	Rugby league, speedway
151	Field Mill	10,000	Mansfield	England	Mansfield Town	Association football
152	Colchester Community Stadium	10,000	Colchester	England	Colchester United	Association football
153	Penydarren Park	10,000	Merthyr Tydfil	Wales	Merthyr Town	Association football
154	New Meadow	9,875	Shrewsbury	England	Shrewsbury Town	Association football
155	Scotstoun Stadium	9,708	Glasgow	Scotland	Glasgow Warriors	Rugby union, athletics
156	Huish Park	9,665	Yeovil	England	Yeovil Town	Association football
157	Abbey Stadium	9,617	Cambridge	England	Cambridge United	Association football
158	Blundell Park	9,546	Cleethorpes	England	Grimsby Town	Association football
159	County Cricket Ground	9,500	Derby	England	Derbyshire County Cricket Club	Cricket
160	New Plough Lane	9,300	London	England	A.F.C. Wimbledon	Association football
161	Brisbane Road	9,271	London	England	Leyton Orient	Association football
162	Glanford Park	9,088	Scunthorpe	England	Scunthorpe United	Association football
163	Stark's Park	8,867	Kirkcaldy	Scotland	Raith Rovers	Association football
164	Withdean Stadium	8,850	Brighton	England	Varndeanians Brighton & Hove Athletics Club	Association football, athletics
165	St James Park	8,830	Exeter	England	Exeter City	Association football
166	Pontypool Park	8,800	Pontypool	Wales	Pontypool RFC	Rugby union
167	Twerton Park	8,800	Bath	England	Bath City	Association football
168	Almondvale Stadium	8,716	Livingston	Scotland	Livingston	Association football
169	Palmerston Park	8,690	Dumfries	Scotland	Queen of the South	Association football
170	The Racecourse	8,500	Durham	England	Durham University CCE	Cricket
171	York Community Stadium	8,500	York	England	York City, York Knights	Association football, rugby league
172	Sixfields Stadium	8,203	Northampton	England	Northampton Town	Association football
173	Broadwood Stadium	8,086	Cumbernauld	Scotland	Broomhill	Association football
174	Ballymena Showgrounds	8,000	Ballymena	Northern Ireland	Ballymena United	Association football
175	Eugene Cross Park	8,000	Ebbw Vale	Wales	Ebbw Vale RFC, Ebbw Vale Cricket Club	Rugby union, cricket
176	New Grosvenor Stadium	8,000	Lisburn	Northern Ireland	Lisburn Distillery	Association football
177	Falkirk Stadium	7,937	Falkirk	Scotland	Falkirk	Association football
178	St Mirren Park	7,937	Paisley	Scotland	St. Mirren	Association football
179	Sardis Road	7,861	Pontypridd	Wales	Pontypridd RFC	Rugby union
180	Cougar Park	7,800	Keighley	England	Steeton, Keighley Cougars	Association football, rugby league
181	Edinburgh Rugby Stadium	7,800	Edinburgh	Scotland	Edinburgh Rugby	Rugby union
182	Brandywell Stadium	7,700	Derry	Northern Ireland	Derry City	Association football
183	Victoria Park	7,691	Hartlepool	England	Hartlepool United	Association football
184	Caledonian Stadium	7,512	Inverness	Scotland	Inverness Caledonian Thistle	Association football
185	Craven Park	7,500	Barrow-in-Furness	England	Barrow Raiders	Rugby league
186	Recreation Ground	7,500	Whitehaven	England	Whitehaven	Rugby league
187	South Kesteven Sports Stadium	7,500	Grantham	England	Grantham Town	Association football
188	Mount Pleasant	7,300	Batley	England	Batley Bulldogs	Rugby league
189	Recreation Ground	7,100	Aldershot	England	Aldershot Town	Association football
190	Whaddon Road	7,066	Cheltenham	England	Cheltenham Town	Association football
191	Queen's Park	7,000	Chesterfield	England	Chesterfield CC, Derbyshire County Cricket Club*	Cricket
192	Cherrywood Road	7,000	Farnborough	England	Farnborough	Association football
193	Academy Stadium	7,000	Manchester	England	Manchester City Women	Association football
194	Pirelli Stadium	6,912	Burton upon Trent	England	Burton Albion	Association football
195	Queen's Club Centre Court	6,858	London	England	Queen's Club Championships	Tennis
196	Post Office Road	6,816	Featherstone	England	Featherstone Rovers	Rugby league
197	Station Park	6,777	Forfar	Scotland	Forfar Athletic	Association football
198	Broadhall Way	6,722	Stevenage	England	Stevenage	Association football
199	National Speedway Stadium	6,700	Manchester	England	Belle Vue Aces	Speedway, American football
200	York Street	6,643	Boston	England	Railway Athletic	Association football
201	Bob Lucas Stadium	6,600	Weymouth	England	Weymouth	Association football
202	Gayfield Park	6,600	Arbroath	Scotland	Arbroath	Association football
203	Victoria Park	6,541	Dingwall	Scotland	Ross County	Association football
204	Hertinfordbury Park	6,500	Hertford	England	Hertford Town	Association football
205	Bower Fold	6,500	Stalybridge	England	Stalybridge Celtic, Oldham R.L.F.C.	Association football, rugby league
206	County Cricket Ground	6,500	Northampton	England	Northamptonshire County Cricket Club	Cricket
207	County Ground	6,500	Taunton	England	Somerset County Cricket Club, England women's cricket team	Cricket
208	Crabble Athletic Ground	6,500	River	England	Dover Athletic	Association football
209	Manchester Regional Arena	6,500	Manchester	England	Manchester City Women	Athletics, association football
210	Seaview	6,500	Belfast	Northern Ireland	Crusaders	Association football
211	The Showgrounds	6,500	Coleraine	Northern Ireland	Coleraine, Newry City	Association football
212	Globe Arena	6,476	Morecambe	England	Morecambe	Association football
213	The Hive Stadium	6,418	London	England	Barnet	Association football
214	Moss Rose	6,355	Macclesfield	England	Macclesfield Town	Association football
215	New Bucks Head	6,300	Telford	England	Telford United	Association football
216	Aggborough	6,238	Kidderminster	England	Kidderminster Harriers	Association football
217	Broadfield Stadium	6,134	Crawley	England	Crawley Town	Association football
218	Plainmoor	6,104	Torquay	England	Torquay United	Association football
219	Moss Lane	6,085	Altrincham	England	Altrincham	Association football
220	Victoria Road	6,078	London	England	Dagenham & Redbridge	Association football
221	Kingfield Stadium	6,036	Woking	England	Woking	Association football
222	New Douglas Park	6,018	Hamilton	Scotland	Hamilton Academical	Association football
223	Haig Avenue	6,008	Southport	England	Southport	Association football
224	County Cricket Ground	6,000	Chelmsford	England	Essex County Cricket Club*	Cricket
225	Inver Park	6,000	Larne	Northern Ireland	Larne	Association football
226	Jenner Park Stadium	6,000	Barry	Wales	Barry Town	Association football, athletics
227	Solitude	6,000	Belfast	Northern Ireland	Cliftonville	Association football
228	Taylor's Avenue	6,000	Carrickfergus	Northern Ireland	Carrick Rangers	Association football
229	The Camrose	6,000	Basingstoke	England	Basingstoke Town	Association football
230	The Gnoll	6,000	Neath	Wales	Neath F.C., Neath RFC, South Wales Scorpions	Association football, rugby union, rugby league
231	Victoria Road	6,000	Port Talbot	Wales	Port Talbot Town	Association football
232	Footes Lane	6,000	Guernsey	Guernsey	Guernsey	Association football
233	Butlin Road	6,000	Rugby	England		Association football
234	Old Deer Park	5,850	London	England	London Welsh	Rugby union
235	The Walks Stadium	5,733	King's Lynn	England	King's Lynn Town	Association football
236	The Runnymede Stadium	5,565	Egham	England	Egham Town	Association football
237	Park Avenue	5,500	Aberystwyth	Wales	Aberystwyth Town	Association football
238	Poole Stadium	5,500	Poole	England	Poole Pirates	Speedway, greyhound racing
239	Dixon Park	5,333	Ballyclare	Northern Ireland	Ballyclare Comrades, Ards	Association football
240	Deva Stadium	5,328	Chester	England	Chester	Association football
241	Edgar Street	5,227	Hereford	England	Hereford	Association football
242	Ten Acres	5,192	Eastleigh	England	Eastleigh	Association football
243	The New Lawn	5,147	Nailsworth	England	Forest Green Rovers	Association football
244	Crown Flatt	5,100	Dewsbury	England	Dewsbury Rams	Rugby league
245	Jakemans Community Stadium	5,061	Boston	England	Boston united	Association football
246	Crown Ground	5,057	Accrington	England	Accrington Stanley	Association football
247	Victoria Stadium	5,046	Northwich	England		Association football
248	Gander Green Lane	5,013	London	England	Sutton United	Association football
249	Stonebridge Road	5,011	Northfleet	England	Ebbsfleet United	Association football
250	Avenue Stadium	5,009	Dorchester	England	Dorchester Town	Association football
251	Hughenden Stadium	5,000	Glasgow	Scotland	Hillhead Jordanhill	Rugby union
252	Talbot Athletic Ground	5,000	Port Talbot	Wales	Aberavon	Rugby union
253	The Grange	5,000	Edinburgh	Scotland	Scotland national cricket team	Cricket
254	The Valley	5,000	Redditch	England	Redditch United	Association football
255	The Meadow	5,000	Chesham	England	Chesham United, Aylesbury United	Association football
256	Raymond McEnhill Stadium	5,000	Salisbury	England	Salisbury City	Association football
257	Latham Park	5,000	Newtown	Wales	Newtown	Association football
258	Mourneview Park	5,000	Lurgan	Northern Ireland	Glenavon	Association football
259	Skegoneill Avenue	5,000	Belfast	Northern Ireland	Brantwood	Association football
260	Stormont	5,000	Belfast	Northern Ireland	Civil Service North of Ireland Cricket Club	Cricket
261	Victoria Park	5,000	Buckie	Scotland	Buckie Thistle	Association football

== See also ==
- Football in the United Kingdom
- List of indoor arenas in the United Kingdom
- List of cricket grounds in England and Wales
- List of English football stadiums by capacity
- List of English rugby league stadiums by capacity
- List of English rugby union stadiums by capacity
- List of stadiums in England
- List of Gaelic Athletic Association stadiums
- List of stadiums in Ireland by capacity
- List of association football stadiums in Northern Ireland
- List of Scottish football stadiums by capacity
- List of stadiums in Wales by capacity
- List of European stadiums by capacity
- Lists of stadiums
