= List of stadiums in Ireland by capacity =

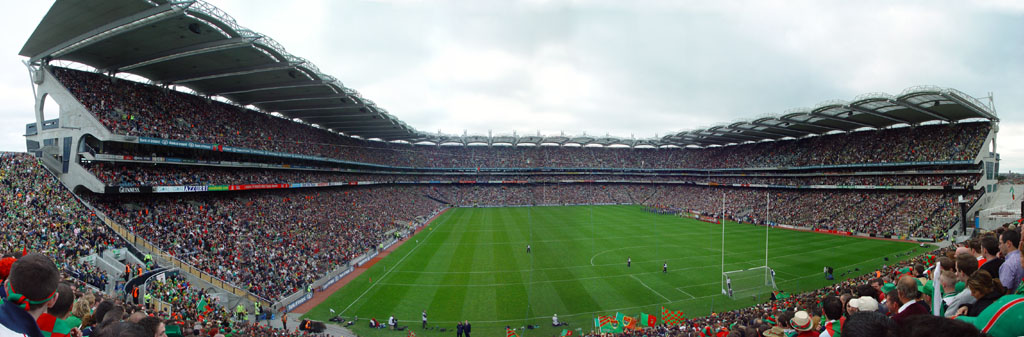
Croke Park has the largest capacity of any stadium in Ireland and the third largest in Europe

The following is a list of sports stadiums on Ireland. This includes stadiums in both Northern Ireland and the Republic of Ireland. They are ordered by their capacity. The capacity figures are permanent total capacity as authorised by the controlling body, including seating and any standing areas, and excluding any temporary seating. The minimum required capacity is 1,000.

Most stadiums are used for Gaelic games, association football, or rugby union.

== Stadiums ==
In italics are those currently under redevelopment/construction/planning. This list is not complete. Up to date as of 3 February 2026.

Rank	Stadium	Location	Owner(s) or tenants	Main use(s)	Capacity (safe)	Seated	Previous capacity	Floodlit/Lit	Image
1	Croke Park	Dublin	Gaelic Athletic Association	Gaelic football/Hurling	82,300	69,500	90,556	Yes	
2	Aviva Stadium	Dublin	IRFU/FAI/Leinster Rugby	Rugby union/Association football	51,700	51,700		Yes	
3	Semple Stadium	Thurles	Tipperary GAA	Gaelic football/Hurling	45,690	24,000	53,500	Yes	
4	Páirc Uí Chaoimh	Cork	Cork GAA	Gaelic football/Hurling	45,000	21,000	32,550	Yes	
5	Gaelic Grounds; Páirc na nGael	Limerick	Limerick GAA	Gaelic football/Hurling	44,023	20,293	49,866	Yes	
6	Fitzgerald Stadium	Killarney	Kerry GAA	Gaelic football	38,000	9,000	43,180	No	
7	St Tiernach's Park	Clones	Monaghan GAA	Gaelic football	29,000	18,500	36,000	No	
8	MacHale Park	Castlebar	Mayo GAA	Gaelic football/Hurling	27,870	27,870	38,000	Yes	
9	Nowlan Park	Kilkenny	Kilkenny GAA	Hurling	27,000	18,000	30,000	No	
10	Pearse Stadium	Galway	Galway GAA	Gaelic football/Hurling	26,197	8,000	34,000	Yes	
11	Thomond Park	Limerick	IRFU/Munster Rugby	Rugby union	25,600	15,100		Yes	
12	Breffni Park	Cavan	Cavan GAA	Gaelic football	25,030	5,030		Yes	
13	Dr. Hyde Park	Roscommon	Roscommon GAA	Gaelic football	23,900	9,000	25,000	No	
14	O'Moore Park	Portlaoise	Laois GAA	Gaelic football/Hurling	22,000	6,500		Yes	
15	RDS Arena	Dublin	Royal Dublin Society/Leinster Rugby	Equestrianism/rugby union	20,600	18,500	18,500	Yes	
16	Cusack Park	Ennis	Clare GAA	Gaelic football/Hurling	20,100	3,269	28,000	No	
17	Páirc Esler	Newry	Down GAA	Gaelic football/Hurling	20,000	8,000		Yes	
18	Windsor Park	Belfast	Linfield/IFA	Association football	18,614	18,000	24,734	Yes	
19	Markievicz Park	Sligo	Sligo GAA	Gaelic football/Hurling	18,558	3,585		No	
20	Athletic Grounds	Armagh	Armagh GAA	Gaelic football/Hurling	18,500	5,575		Yes	
21	Celtic Park	Derry	Derry GAA	Gaelic football/Hurling	18,500	3,600	22,000	Yes	
22	Ravenhill Stadium	Belfast	IRFU/Ulster Rugby	Rugby union	18,196	9,000	12,000	Yes	
23	Wexford Park	Wexford	Wexford GAA	Gaelic football/Hurling	18,000	9,000		Yes	
24	O'Connor Park	Tullamore	Offaly GAA	Gaelic football/Hurling	18,000	7,000		No	
25	Brewster Park	Enniskillen	Fermanagh GAA	Gaelic football/Hurling	18,000			Yes	
26	Healy Park	Omagh	Tyrone GAA	Gaelic football/Hurling	17,636	4,500		Yes	
27	MacCumhaill Park	Ballybofey	Donegal GAA	Gaelic football/Hurling	17,500	4,310		Yes	
28	Páirc Uí Rinn	Cork	Cork GAA	Gaelic football/Hurling	16,440	8,000		Yes	
29	Fraher Field	Dungarvan	Waterford GAA	Gaelic football/Hurling	15,000	4,000		Yes	
30	St Conleth's Park	Newbridge	Kildare GAA	Gaelic football/Hurling	15,000	3,000	13,000; 8,200	Yes	
31	Austin Stack Park	Tralee	Kerry GAA	Gaelic football/Hurling	14,000	5,000	15,000	Yes	
32	St Mary's Park	Castleblayney	Monaghan GAA	Gaelic football/Hurling	14,000	4,000		Yes	
33	Galway Sportsgrounds	Galway	Bord na gCon/Connacht Rugby	Greyhound racing/Rugby union	12,500	4,955	8,129	Yes	
34	Malahide Cricket Club Ground	Malahide	Cricket Ireland; Malahide Cricket Club	Cricket	11,500	N/A		No	
35	Cusack Park	Mullingar	Westmeath GAA	Gaelic football/Hurling	11,500		15,000	No	
36	Walsh Park	Waterford	Waterford GAA	Gaelic football/Hurling	11,046	6,000		No	
37	Páirc Tailteann	Navan	Meath GAA	Gaelic football/Hurling	11,000	5,000	30,000	Yes	
38	Dr. Cullen Park	Carlow	Carlow GAA	Gaelic football/Hurling	11,000	3,000	21,000	Yes	
39	Tallaght Stadium	Dublin	SDCC/Shamrock Rovers	Association football	10,547	10,000	8,000	Yes	
40	Páirc Seán Mac Diarmada	Carrick-on-Shannon	Leitrim GAA	Gaelic football	9,331	3,000	15,000	No	
41	Morton Stadium	Dublin	Clonliffe Harriers AC	Athletics	8,800	800		Yes	
42	St Brendan's Park	Birr	Offaly GAA	Athletics	8,800			Yes	
43	Parnell Park	Dublin	Dublin GAA	Gaelic football/Hurling	8,500	2,800	13,500	Yes	
44	O'Donnell Park	Letterkenny	Donegal GAA	Gaelic football	8,200	2,500		No	
45	Musgrave Park	Cork	IRFU/Munster Rugby	Rugby union	8,008	3,450		Yes	
46	Mallow GAA Complex	Mallow	Mallow GAA	Gaelic Football/Hurling	8,000	2,000		Yes	
47	Dubarry Park	Athlone	IRFU	Rugby union	8,000	850		Yes	
48	Turner's Cross	Cork	Cork City	Association football	7,385	7,385		Yes	
49	Aughrim County Ground	Aughrim	Wicklow GAA	Gaelic games	7,000	5,000		No	
50	O'Garney Park	Sixmilebridge	Clare GAA	Gaelic games	7,000	2,000		Yes	
51	St Jarlath's Park	Tuam	Galway GAA	Gaelic football/Hurling	6,700		26,000	No	
52	The Brandywell	Derry	Derry City	Association football	6,300	6,300	7,000	Yes	
53	Donnybrook Stadium	Dublin	Leinster Rugby	Rugby union	6,000	2,500		Yes	
54	Pearse Park	Longford	Longford GAA	Gaelic football/Hurling	6,000	2,000	18,000	No	
55	Stormont	Belfast	Cricket Ireland	Cricket	6,000			No	
56	Fr Tierney Park	Ballyshannon	Donegal GAA	Gaelic Games	5,600			No	
57	Richmond Park	Dublin	St Patrick's Athletic	Association football	5,500	2,800		Yes	
58	Bishopsgate	Longford	Longford Town	Association football	5,097	4,960		Yes	
59	The Oval	Belfast	Glentoran	Association football	5,056	3,991	26,556	Yes	
60	Eamonn Deacy Park	Galway	Galway Football Association/Galway United	Association football	5,000	3,300		Yes	
61	Pearse Park	Arklow	Wicklow GAA	Hurling	5,000			No	
62	Athlone Town Stadium	Athlone	Athlone Town	Association football	5,000	2,024		Yes	
63	Finn Park	Ballybofey	Finn Harps	Association football	4,600	400	7,000	Yes	
64	Oriel Park	Dundalk	Dundalk	Association football	4,500	3,000		Yes	
65	Dalymount Park	Dublin	Dublin City Council/Bohemians	Association football	4,500		10,000	Yes	
66	Tolka Park	Dublin	Dublin City Council/Shelbourne	Association football	4,200	4,200	9,860	Yes	
67	Templeville Road	Dublin	St Mary's College RFC	Rugby union	4,000	0		Yes	
68	National Indoor Athletics Training Centre	Abbotstown	Sport Ireland	Athletics	4,000	400		Yes	
69	St Colman's Park	Cobh	Cobh Ramblers	Association football	4,000	1,350		Yes	
70	John Fitzgerald Park	Kilmallock	Limerick GAA	Gaelic Football/Hurling	4,000			Yes	
71	The Showgrounds	Sligo	Sligo Rovers	Association football	3,873	3,873		Yes	
72	Corrigan Park	Belfast	Antrim GAA	Gaelic football/Hurling	3,700	600	5,000; 2,100	No	
73	Ballymena Showgrounds	Ballymena	Mid and East Antrim Borough Council/Ballymena United F.C.	Association football	3,600	3,600	8,426	Yes	
74	Drogheda Park	Drogheda	Gaelic Athletic Association	Gaelic football	3,500			No	
75	Seaview	Belfast	Crusaders F.C.	Association football	3,383	3,383			
76	Donegal Community Stadium	Donegal	Finn Harps FC	Association football	3,300	5,400		Yes	
77	Inver Park	Larne	Larne F.C.	Association football	3,250	3,250	1,100	Yes	
78	Castle Avenue	Dublin	Cricket Ireland	Cricket	3,200	500		No	
79	Carlisle Grounds	Bray	Bray Wanderers	Association football	3,200	3,200		Yes	
80	Mourneview Park	Glenavon F.C.	Lurgan	Association football	3,200	3,200		Yes	
81	Markets Field	Limerick	Limerick FC	Association football	3,075	1,710	3,000	Yes	
82	Buckley Park	Kilkenny		Association football	3,000	1,850		Yes	
83	UCD Bowl	Dublin	UCD AFC/UCD RFC	Association football/Rugby union	3,000	1,500		Yes	
84	The Mardyke	Cork	UCC AFC/UCC RFC	Association football/Rugby union	3,000	1,000		Yes	
85	Duggan Park	Ballinasloe	Galway GAA	Gaelic Games	3,000			Yes	
86	Waterford Regional Sports Centre	Waterford	Waterford City Council/Waterford United	Association football	2,983	5,160		Yes	
87	Solitude	Belfast	Cliftonville	Association football	2,883	2,883	6,224	Yes	
88	Shamrock Park	Portadown	Portadown F.C.	Association football	2,770	2,770	5,804	Yes	
89	National Aquatic Centre	Abbotstown	Sport Ireland	Swimming/Diving	2,500	2,500		Yes	
90	Station Road	Newbridge	Newbridge Town	Association football	2,500	850		Yes	
91	Jackman Park	Limerick		Association football	2,450	261		Yes	
92	Dixon Park	Ballyclare	Ballyclare Comrades F.C.	Association football	2,398	538		Yes	
93	The Showgrounds	Newry	Newry City A.F.C.	Association football	2,275	1,080	7,949		
94	Ferrycarrig Park	Crossabeg	Wexford F.C.	Association football	2,500	609		Yes	
95	United Park	Drogheda	Drogheda United	Association football	2,000	1,500		Yes	
96	Gortakeegan	Monaghan	Monaghan United	Association football	2,000	620		Yes	
97	Drom Soccer Park	Drum East	Salthill Devon	Association football	2,000			Yes	
98	Hermitage Park	Lixnaw	Lixnaw GAA	Gaelic Athletic Association	1,800	250		No	
99	National Indoor Training Centre	Abbotstown	Sport Ireland	Multi-Sport Arena	1,680	1,680		Yes	
100	Maginn Park	Buncrana	Inishowen Football League (Derry City Temporary Ground)	Association football	1,574	250		Yes	
101	Athlone International Arena	Athlone	TUS Athlone	Athletics	1,500	1,500		Yes	
102	Celtic Park	Castlebar	Castlebar Celtic	Association football	1,500	550		No	
103	Leah Victoria Park	Tullamore	Tullamore Town	Association football	1,500	0		Yes	
104	Hawkfield Centre of Excellence	Newbridge	Kildare GAA	Gaelic Football/Hurling	1,500	200		Yes	
105	Mounthawk Park	Tralee	Kerry F.C.	Association football	1,200	500		Yes	

== See also ==
- List of athletics tracks in Ireland
- List of Gaelic Athletic Association stadiums
- List of association football stadiums in the Republic of Ireland
- Sport in Ireland
- List of stadiums by capacity
- List of British stadiums by capacity
- List of stadiums in England
- List of stadiums in Wales by capacity
- List of European stadiums by capacity
- Lists of stadiums
