= Irish Athletics Championships =

- Sport: Indoor track and field
- Founded: 1873
- Country: Republic of Ireland, Northern Ireland
- Related competitions: Irish Indoor Athletics Championships

The Irish Athletics Championships, also known as the National Senior Track and Field Championships, is an annual outdoor track and field competition organised by Athletics Ireland, which serves as the Irish national championship for the sport.

The event was first held in College Park on Monday 7 July 1873 and has been held every year since, becoming the longest running national championships in the world.

The 152nd edition was held at Morton Stadium in Santry, Dublin on 29 and 30 June 2024.

== Events ==
The below table contains a list of all events held since 1873 claiming to be the Irish National Athletics Championships.

| Edition | Year | Event 1 | Location | Venue | Governing Body | Event 2 | Other Venue | Governing Body | Notes |
|---|---|---|---|---|---|---|---|---|---|
| 1 | 1873 | 1873 Irish Athletics Championships | Dublin | College Park | Irish Champion Athletics Club | N/A | N/A | N/A | |
| 2 | 1874 | 1874 Irish Athletics Championships | Dublin | Lansdowne Road | Irish Champion Athletics Club | N/A | N/A | N/A | |
| 3 | 1875 | 1875 Irish Athletics Championships | Dublin | Lansdowne Road | Irish Champion Athletics Club | N/A | N/A | N/A | |
| 4 | 1876 | 1876 Irish Athletics Championships | Dublin | Lansdowne Road | Irish Champion Athletics Club | N/A | N/A | N/A | |
| 5 | 1877 | 1877 Irish Athletics Championships | Dublin | Lansdowne Road | Irish Champion Athletics Club | N/A | N/A | N/A | |
| 6 | 1878 | 1878 Irish Athletics Championships | Dublin | Lansdowne Road | Irish Champion Athletics Club | N/A | N/A | N/A | |
| 7 | 1879 | 1879 Irish Athletics Championships | Dublin | Lansdowne Road | Irish Champion Athletics Club | N/A | N/A | N/A | |
| 8 | 1880 | 1880 Irish Athletics Championships | Dublin | Lansdowne Road | Irish Champion Athletics Club | N/A | N/A | N/A | |
| 9 | 1881 | 1881 Irish Athletics Championships | Dublin | Lansdowne Road | Irish Champion Athletics Club | N/A | N/A | N/A | |
| 10 | 1882 | 1882 Irish Athletics Championships | Dublin | Lansdowne Road | Dublin Athletic Club | N/A | N/A | N/A | |
| 11 | 1883 | 1883 Irish Athletics Championships | Dublin | Lansdowne Road | Dublin Athletic Club | N/A | N/A | N/A | |
| 12 | 1884 | 1884 Irish Athletics Championships | Dublin | Lansdowne Road | Dublin Athletic Club | N/A | N/A | N/A | |
| 13 | 1885 | 1885 Irish Athletics Championships | Dublin | RDS Showgrounds | Irish Amateur Athletic Association | Waterford | Tramore Racecourse | Gaelic Athletic Association | |
| 14 | 1886 | 1886 Irish Athletics Championships | Dublin | RDS Showgrounds | Irish Amateur Athletic Association | Dublin | RDS Showgrounds | Gaelic Athletic Association | |
| 15 | 1887 | 1887 Irish Athletics Championships | Dublin | RDS Showgrounds | Irish Amateur Athletic Association | Kerry | Tralee | Gaelic Athletic Association | |
| 16 | 1888 | 1888 Irish Athletics Championships | Dublin | RDS Showgrounds | Irish Amateur Athletic Association | Limerick | Limerick | Gaelic Athletic Association | |
| 17 | 1889 | 1889 Irish Athletics Championships | Dublin | RDS Showgrounds | Irish Amateur Athletic Association | Kilkenny | Kilkenny | Gaelic Athletic Association | |
| 18 | 1890 | 1890 Irish Athletics Championships | Dublin | RDS Showgrounds | Irish Amateur Athletic Association | Dublin | Drumcondra | Gaelic Athletic Association | |
| 19 | 1891 | 1891 Irish Athletics Championships | Dublin | RDS Showgrounds | Irish Amateur Athletic Association | Kerry | Tralee | Gaelic Athletic Association | |
| 20 | 1892 | 1892 Irish Athletics Championships | Dublin | RDS Showgrounds | Irish Amateur Athletic Association | Dublin | Jones Road | Gaelic Athletic Association | |
| 21 | 1893 | 1893 Irish Athletics Championships | Dublin | RDS Showgrounds | Irish Amateur Athletic Association | Dublin | Jones Road | Gaelic Athletic Association | |
| 22 | 1894 | 1894 Irish Athletics Championships | Dublin | RDS Showgrounds | Irish Amateur Athletic Association | Dublin | Jones Road | Gaelic Athletic Association | |
| 23 | 1895 | 1895 Irish Athletics Championships | Dublin | RDS Showgrounds | Irish Amateur Athletic Association | Wexford | Wexford Park | Gaelic Athletic Association | |
| 24 | 1896 | 1896 Irish Athletics Championships | Dublin | RDS Showgrounds | Irish Amateur Athletic Association | Dublin | Jones Road | Gaelic Athletic Association | |
| 25 | 1897 | 1897 Irish Athletics Championships | Dublin | RDS Showgrounds | Irish Amateur Athletic Association | Tipperary | Tipperary | Gaelic Athletic Association | |
| 26 | 1898 | 1898 Irish Athletics Championships | Dublin | RDS Showgrounds | Irish Amateur Athletic Association | Cork | Cork | Gaelic Athletic Association | |
| 27 | 1899 | 1899 Irish Athletics Championships | Dublin | RDS Showgrounds | Irish Amateur Athletic Association | Tipperary | Thurles | Gaelic Athletic Association | |
| 28 | 1900 | 1900 Irish Athletics Championships | Dublin | RDS Showgrounds | Irish Amateur Athletic Association | Not held | Not held | Gaelic Athletic Association | |
| 29 | 1901 | 1901 Irish Athletics Championships | Dublin | RDS Showgrounds | Irish Amateur Athletic Association | Limerick | Limerick | Gaelic Athletic Association | |
| 30 | 1902 | 1902 Irish Athletics Championships | Cork | Mardyke | Irish Amateur Athletic Association | Limerick | Limerick | Gaelic Athletic Association | |
| 31 | 1903 | 1903 Irish Athletics Championships | Dublin | RDS Showgrounds | Irish Amateur Athletic Association | Dublin | Jones Road | Gaelic Athletic Association | |
| 32 | 1904 | 1904 Irish Athletics Championships | Dublin | RDS Showgrounds | Irish Amateur Athletic Association | Dublin | Jones Road | Gaelic Athletic Association | |
| 33 | 1905 | 1905 Irish Athletics Championships | Dublin | RDS Showgrounds | Irish Amateur Athletic Association | Cork | Cork Athletic Grounds | Gaelic Athletic Association | |
| 34 | 1906 | 1906 Irish Athletics Championships | Dublin | RDS Showgrounds | Irish Amateur Athletic Association | Cork | Cork Athletic Grounds | Gaelic Athletic Association | |
| 35 | 1907 | 1907 Irish Athletics Championships | Dublin | RDS Showgrounds | Irish Amateur Athletic Association | Tipperary | Thurles | Gaelic Athletic Association | |
| 36 | 1908 | 1908 Irish Athletics Championships | Dublin | RDS Showgrounds | Irish Amateur Athletic Association | Cork | Fermoy | Gaelic Athletic Association | |
| 37 | 1909 | 1909 Irish Athletics Championships | Dublin | RDS Showgrounds | Irish Amateur Athletic Association | Cork | Mallow | Gaelic Athletic Association | |
| 38 | 1910 | 1910 Irish Athletics Championships | Dublin | RDS Showgrounds | Irish Amateur Athletic Association | Cork | Mallow | Gaelic Athletic Association | |
| 39 | 1911 | 1911 Irish Athletics Championships | Dublin | RDS Showgrounds | Irish Amateur Athletic Association | Cork | Mallow | Gaelic Athletic Association | |
| 40 | 1912 | 1912 Irish Athletics Championships | Dublin | RDS Showgrounds | Irish Amateur Athletic Association | Cork | Fermoy | Gaelic Athletic Association | |
| 41 | 1913 | 1913 Irish Athletics Championships | Dublin | RDS Showgrounds | Irish Amateur Athletic Association | Cork | Mallow | Gaelic Athletic Association | |
| 42 | 1914 | 1914 Irish Athletics Championships | Dublin | RDS Showgrounds | Irish Amateur Athletic Association | Cork | Mallow | Gaelic Athletic Association | |
| 43 | 1915 | 1915 Irish Athletics Championships | Cork | Fermoy | Gaelic Athletic Association | N/A | N/A | N/A | |
| 44 | 1916 | 1916 Irish Athletics Championships | Cork | Mallow | Gaelic Athletic Association | N/A | N/A | N/A | |
| 45 | 1917 | 1917 Irish Athletics Championships | Limerick | | Gaelic Athletic Association | N/A | N/A | N/A | |
| 46 | 1918 | 1918 Irish Athletics Championships | Limerick | | Gaelic Athletic Association | N/A | N/A | N/A | |
| 47 | 1919 | 1919 Irish Athletics Championships | Dublin | Lansdowne Road | Gaelic Athletic Association | Limerick | Limerick | Gaelic Athletic Association | |
| 48 | 1920 | 1920 Irish Athletics Championships | Dublin | Lansdowne Road | Irish Amateur Athletic Association | Dublin | Croke Park | Gaelic Athletic Association | |
| 49 | 1921 | 1921 Irish Athletics Championships | Dublin | Lansdowne Road | Irish Amateur Athletic Association | Dublin | Croke Park | Gaelic Athletic Association | |
| 50 | 1922 | 1922 Irish Athletics Championships | Dublin | Lansdowne Road | Irish Amateur Athletic Association | Dublin | Croke Park | Gaelic Athletic Association | |
| 51 | 1923 | 1923 Irish Athletics Championships | Dublin | Croke Park | National Athletic and Cycling Association | N/A | N/A | N/A | |
| 52 | 1924 | 1924 Irish Athletics Championships | Dublin | Croke Park | National Athletic and Cycling Association | N/A | N/A | N/A | |
| 53 | 1925 | 1925 Irish Athletics Championships | Dublin | Croke Park | National Athletic and Cycling Association | N/A | N/A | N/A | |
| 54 | 1926 | 1926 Irish Athletics Championships | Dublin | Croke Park | National Athletic and Cycling Association | N/A | N/A | N/A | Video of the national championships from 1926 in Croke Park |
| 55 | 1927 | 1927 Irish Athletics Championships | Dublin | Croke Park | National Athletic and Cycling Association | N/A | N/A | N/A | |
| 56 | 1928 | 1928 Irish Athletics Championships | Dublin | Croke Park | National Athletic and Cycling Association | N/A | N/A | N/A | |
| 57 | 1929 | 1929 Irish Athletics Championships | Dublin | Croke Park | National Athletic and Cycling Association | N/A | N/A | N/A | |
| 58 | 1930 | 1930 Irish Athletics Championships | Dublin | Croke Park | National Athletic and Cycling Association | N/A | N/A | N/A | |
| 59 | 1931 | 1931 Irish Athletics Championships | Dublin | Croke Park | National Athletic and Cycling Association | N/A | N/A | N/A | |
| 60 | 1932 | 1932 Irish Athletics Championships | Dublin | Croke Park | National Athletic and Cycling Association | N/A | N/A | N/A | |
| 61 | 1933 | 1933 Irish Athletics Championships | Dublin | Croke Park | National Athletic and Cycling Association | N/A | N/A | N/A | |
| 62 | 1934 | 1934 Irish Athletics Championships | Cork | Fermoy | National Athletic and Cycling Association | N/A | N/A | N/A | |
| 63 | 1935 | 1935 Irish Athletics Championships | Kilkenny | Kilkenny | National Athletic and Cycling Association | N/A | N/A | N/A | |
| 64 | 1936 | 1936 Irish Athletics Championships | Tipperary | Clonmel | National Athletic and Cycling Association | N/A | N/A | N/A | |
| 65 | 1937 | 1937 Irish Athletics Championships | Dublin | Morgan's School, Castleknock | Amateur Athletic Union of Éire | Kerry | Killarney | National Athletic and Cycling Association | |
| 66 | 1938 | 1938 Irish Athletics Championships | Dublin | Lansdowne Road | Amateur Athletic Union of Éire | Meath | Drogheda | National Athletic and Cycling Association | |
| 67 | 1939 | 1939 Irish Athletics Championships | Dublin | Lansdowne Road | Amateur Athletic Union of Éire | Tipperary | Thurles | National Athletic and Cycling Association | |
| 68 | 1940 | 1940 Irish Athletics Championships | Dublin | College Park | Amateur Athletic Union of Éire | Cork | Fermoy | National Athletic and Cycling Association | |
| 69 | 1941 | 1941 Irish Athletics Championships | Dublin | College Park | Amateur Athletic Union of Éire | | Drogheda and Enniscorthy | National Athletic and Cycling Association | |
| 70 | 1942 | 1942 Irish Athletics Championships | Dublin | College Park | Amateur Athletic Union of Éire | | Dundalk and Enniscorthy | National Athletic and Cycling Association | |
| 71 | 1943 | 1943 Irish Athletics Championships | Dublin | College Park | Amateur Athletic Union of Éire | | Dundalk and Clonmel | National Athletic and Cycling Association | |
| 72 | 1944 | 1944 Irish Athletics Championships | Dublin | College Park | Amateur Athletic Union of Éire | Louth | Dundalk | National Athletic and Cycling Association | |
| 73 | 1945 | 1945 Irish Athletics Championships | Dublin | College Park | Amateur Athletic Union of Éire | | Dundalk and Ballinasloe | National Athletic and Cycling Association | |
| 74 | 1946 | 1946 Irish Athletics Championships | Dublin | Lansdowne Road | Amateur Athletic Union of Éire | Louth | Dundalk | National Athletic and Cycling Association | |
| 75 | 1947 | 1947 Irish Athletics Championships | Dublin | Lansdowne Road | Amateur Athletic Union of Éire | Louth | Dundalk | National Athletic and Cycling Association | |
| 76 | 1948 | 1948 Irish Athletics Championships | Dublin | College Park | Amateur Athletic Union of Éire | | Ballinasloe and Blarney | National Athletic and Cycling Association | |
| 77 | 1949 | 1949 Irish Athletics Championships | Dublin | Lansdowne Road | Amateur Athletic Union of Éire | Louth | Dundalk | National Athletic and Cycling Association | |
| 78 | 1950 | 1950 Irish Athletics Championships | Dublin | College Park | Amateur Athletic Union of Éire | Louth | Dundalk | National Athletic and Cycling Association | |
| 79 | 1951 | 1951 Irish Athletics Championships | Dublin | Shelbourne Stadium | Amateur Athletic Union of Éire | Dublin | Iveagh Grounds | National Athletic and Cycling Association | |
| 80 | 1952 | 1952 Irish Athletics Championships | Dublin | Shelbourne Stadium | Amateur Athletic Union of Éire | Dublin | Iveagh Grounds | National Athletic and Cycling Association | |
| 81 | 1953 | 1953 Irish Athletics Championships | Dublin | Shelbourne Stadium | Amateur Athletic Union of Éire | Belfast | Casement Park | National Athletic and Cycling Association | |
| 82 | 1954 | 1954 Irish Athletics Championships | Dublin | Shelbourne Stadium | Amateur Athletic Union of Éire | Dublin | Iveagh Grounds | National Athletic and Cycling Association | |
| 83 | 1955 | 1955 Irish Athletics Championships | Dublin | College Park | Amateur Athletic Union of Éire | Dublin | Iveagh Grounds | National Athletic and Cycling Association | |
| 84 | 1956 | 1956 Irish Athletics Championships | Dublin | College Park | Amateur Athletic Union of Éire | Dublin | Iveagh Grounds | National Athletic and Cycling Association | |
| 85 | 1957 | 1957 Irish Athletics Championships | Dublin | Lansdowne Road | Amateur Athletic Union of Éire | Dublin | Iveagh Grounds | National Athletic and Cycling Association | |
| 86 | 1958 | 1958 Irish Athletics Championships | Dublin | Santry Stadium | Amateur Athletic Union of Éire | Dublin | Iveagh Grounds | National Athletic and Cycling Association | |
| 87 | 1959 | 1959 Irish Athletics Championships | Dublin | Santry Stadium | Amateur Athletic Union of Éire | Dublin | Iveagh Grounds | National Athletic and Cycling Association | |
| 88 | 1960 | 1960 Irish Athletics Championships | Dublin | Santry Stadium | Amateur Athletic Union of Éire | Dublin | Iveagh Grounds | National Athletic and Cycling Association | |
| 89 | 1961 | 1961 Irish Athletics Championships | Dublin | Santry Stadium | Amateur Athletic Union of Éire | Cork | Fermoy | National Athletic and Cycling Association | |
| 90 | 1962 | 1962 Irish Athletics Championships | Dublin | Santry Stadium | Bord Lúthchleas na hÉireann | Kerry | Killarney | National Athletic and Cycling Association | |
| 91 | 1963 | 1963 Irish Athletics Championships | Dublin | Santry Stadium | Bord Lúthchleas na hÉireann | Kerry | Killarney | National Athletic and Cycling Association | |
| 92 | 1964 | 1964 Irish Athletics Championships | Dublin | Santry Stadium | Bord Lúthchleas na hÉireann | County Wexford | Gorey | National Athletic and Cycling Association | |
| 93 | 1965 | 1965 Irish Athletics Championships | Dublin | Santry Stadium | Bord Lúthchleas na hÉireann | Cork | Banteer | National Athletic and Cycling Association | |
| 94 | 1966 | 1966 Irish Athletics Championships | Dublin | Santry Stadium | Bord Lúthchleas na hÉireann | Cork | Banteer | National Athletic and Cycling Association | |
| 95 | 1967 | 1967 Irish Athletics Championships | Dublin | Santry Stadium | Bord Lúthchleas na hÉireann | Tipperary | Tipperary | Bord Lúthchleas na hÉireann (Women) | |
| 96 | 1968 | 1968 Irish Athletics Championships | Dublin | Santry Stadium | Bord Lúthchleas na hÉireann | N/A | N/A | N/A | |
| 97 | 1969 | 1969 Irish Athletics Championships | Dublin | Santry Stadium | Bord Lúthchleas na hÉireann | N/A | N/A | N/A | |
| 98 | 1970 | 1970 Irish Athletics Championships | Cork | Banteer | Bord Lúthchleas na hÉireann | N/A | N/A | N/A | |
| 99 | 1971 | 1971 Irish Athletics Championships | Dublin | Santry Stadium | Bord Lúthchleas na hÉireann | N/A | N/A | N/A | |
| 100 | 1972 | 1972 Irish Athletics Championships | Cork | Banteer | Bord Lúthchleas na hÉireann | N/A | N/A | N/A | |
| 101 | 1973 | 1973 Irish Athletics Championships | Cork | Mardyke | Bord Lúthchleas na hÉireann | N/A | N/A | N/A | |
| 102 | 1974 | 1974 Irish Athletics Championships | Dublin | Santry Stadium | Bord Lúthchleas na hÉireann | N/A | N/A | N/A | |
| 103 | 1975 | 1975 Irish Athletics Championships | Dublin | Belfield | Bord Lúthchleas na hÉireann | N/A | N/A | N/A | |
| 104 | 1976 | 1976 Irish Athletics Championships | Limerick | | Bord Lúthchleas na hÉireann | N/A | N/A | N/A | |
| 105 | 1977 | 1977 Irish Athletics Championships | Dublin | Belfield | Bord Lúthchleas na hÉireann | N/A | N/A | N/A | |
| 106 | 1978 | 1978 Irish Athletics Championships | Dublin | Belfield | Bord Lúthchleas na hÉireann | N/A | N/A | N/A | |
| 107 | 1979 | 1979 Irish Athletics Championships | Dublin | Belfield | Bord Lúthchleas na hÉireann | N/A | N/A | N/A | |
| 108 | 1980 | 1980 Irish Athletics Championships | Dublin | Belfield | Bord Lúthchleas na hÉireann | N/A | N/A | N/A | |
| 109 | 1981 | 1981 Irish Athletics Championships | Dublin | Morton Stadium | Bord Lúthchleas na hÉireann | N/A | N/A | N/A | |
| 110 | 1982 | 1982 Irish Athletics Championships | Dublin | Morton Stadium | Bord Lúthchleas na hÉireann | N/A | N/A | N/A | |
| 111 | 1983 | 1983 Irish Athletics Championships | Dublin | Morton Stadium | Bord Lúthchleas na hÉireann | N/A | N/A | N/A | |
| 112 | 1984 | 1984 Irish Athletics Championships | Dublin | Morton Stadium | Bord Lúthchleas na hÉireann | N/A | N/A | N/A | |
| 113 | 1985 | 1985 Irish Athletics Championships | Cork | Cork Institute of Technology | Bord Lúthchleas na hÉireann | N/A | N/A | N/A | |
| 114 | 1986 | 1986 Irish Athletics Championships | Offaly | Tullamore Harriers | Bord Lúthchleas na hÉireann | N/A | N/A | N/A | |
| 115 | 1987 | 1987 Irish Athletics Championships | Offaly | Tullamore Harriers | Bord Lúthchleas na hÉireann | N/A | N/A | N/A | |
| 116 | 1988 | 1988 Irish Athletics Championships | Dublin | Morton Stadium | Bord Lúthchleas na hÉireann | N/A | N/A | N/A | |
| 117 | 1989 | 1989 Irish Athletics Championships | Cork | Cork Institute of Technology | Bord Lúthchleas na hÉireann | N/A | N/A | N/A | |
| 118 | 1990 | 1990 Irish Athletics Championships | Offaly | Tullamore Harriers | Bord Lúthchleas na hÉireann | N/A | N/A | N/A | |
| 119 | 1991 | 1991 Irish Athletics Championships | Dublin | Morton Stadium | Bord Lúthchleas na hÉireann | N/A | N/A | N/A | |
| 120 | 1992 | 1992 Irish Athletics Championships | Dublin | Belfield | Bord Lúthchleas na hÉireann | N/A | N/A | N/A | |
| 121 | 1993 | 1993 Irish Athletics Championships | Dublin | Belfield | Bord Lúthchleas na hÉireann | N/A | N/A | N/A | |
| 122 | 1994 | 1994 Irish Athletics Championships | Dublin | Morton Stadium | Bord Lúthchleas na hÉireann | N/A | N/A | N/A | |
| 123 | 1995 | 1995 Irish Athletics Championships | Dublin | Morton Stadium | Bord Lúthchleas na hÉireann | N/A | N/A | N/A | |
| 124 | 1996 | 1996 Irish Athletics Championships | Dublin | Morton Stadium | Bord Lúthchleas na hÉireann | N/A | N/A | N/A | |
| 125 | 1997 | 1997 Irish Athletics Championships | Dublin | Morton Stadium | Bord Lúthchleas na hÉireann | N/A | N/A | N/A | |
| 126 | 1998 | 1998 Irish Athletics Championships | Dublin | Morton Stadium | Bord Lúthchleas na hÉireann | N/A | N/A | N/A | |
| 127 | 1999 | 1999 Irish Athletics Championships | Dublin | Morton Stadium | Bord Lúthchleas na hÉireann | N/A | N/A | N/A | |
| 128 | 2000 | 2000 Irish Athletics Championships | Dublin | Morton Stadium | Athletics Ireland | N/A | N/A | N/A | |
| 129 | 2001 | 2001 Irish Athletics Championships | Dublin | Morton Stadium | Athletics Ireland | N/A | N/A | N/A | |
| 130 | 2002 | 2002 Irish Athletics Championships | Dublin | Morton Stadium | Athletics Ireland | N/A | N/A | N/A | |
| 131 | 2003 | 2003 Irish Athletics Championships | Dublin | Morton Stadium | Athletics Ireland | N/A | N/A | N/A | |
| 132 | 2004 | 2004 Irish Athletics Championships | Dublin | Morton Stadium | Athletics Ireland | N/A | N/A | N/A | |
| 133 | 2005 | 2005 Irish Athletics Championships | Dublin | Morton Stadium | Athletics Ireland | N/A | N/A | N/A | |
| 134 | 2006 | 2006 Irish Athletics Championships | Dublin | Morton Stadium | Athletics Ireland | N/A | N/A | N/A | |
| 135 | 2007 | 2007 Irish Athletics Championships | Dublin | Morton Stadium | Athletics Ireland | N/A | N/A | N/A | |
| 136 | 2008 | 2008 Irish Athletics Championships | Dublin | Morton Stadium | Athletics Ireland | N/A | N/A | N/A | |
| 137 | 2009 | 2009 Irish Athletics Championships | Dublin | Morton Stadium | Athletics Ireland | N/A | N/A | N/A | |
| 138 | 2010 | 2000 Irish Athletics Championships | Dublin | Morton Stadium | Athletics Ireland | N/A | N/A | N/A | |
| 139 | 2011 | 2011 Irish Athletics Championships | Dublin | Morton Stadium | Athletics Ireland | N/A | N/A | N/A | |
| 140 | 2012 | 2012 Irish Athletics Championships | Dublin | Morton Stadium | Athletics Ireland | N/A | N/A | N/A | |
| 141 | 2013 | 2013 Irish Athletics Championships | Dublin | Morton Stadium | Athletics Ireland | N/A | N/A | N/A | |
| 142 | 2014 | 2014 Irish Athletics Championships | Dublin | Morton Stadium | Athletics Ireland | N/A | N/A | N/A | |
| 143 | 2015 | 2015 Irish Athletics Championships | Dublin | Morton Stadium | Athletics Ireland | N/A | N/A | N/A | |
| 144 | 2016 | 2016 Irish Athletics Championships | Dublin | Morton Stadium | Athletics Ireland | N/A | N/A | N/A | |
| 145 | 2017 | 2017 Irish Athletics Championships | Dublin | Morton Stadium | Athletics Ireland | N/A | N/A | N/A | |
| 146 | 2018 | 2018 Irish Athletics Championships | Dublin | Morton Stadium | Athletics Ireland | N/A | N/A | N/A | |
| 147 | 2019 | 2019 Irish Athletics Championships | Dublin | Morton Stadium | Athletics Ireland | N/A | N/A | N/A | |
| 148 | 2020 | 2020 Irish Athletics Championships | Dublin | Morton Stadium | Athletics Ireland | N/A | N/A | N/A | |
| 149 | 2021 | 2021 Irish Athletics Championships | Dublin | Morton Stadium | Athletics Ireland | N/A | N/A | N/A | |
| 150 | 2022 | 2022 Irish Athletics Championships | Dublin | Morton Stadium | Athletics Ireland | N/A | N/A | N/A | |
| 151 | 2023 | 2023 Irish Athletics Championships | Dublin | Morton Stadium | Athletics Ireland | N/A | N/A | N/A | |
| 152 | 2024 | 2024 Irish Athletics Championships | Dublin | Morton Stadium | Athletics Ireland | N/A | N/A | N/A | |
| 153 | 2025 | 2025 Irish Athletics Championships | Dublin | Morton Stadium | Athletics Ireland | N/A | N/A | N/A | |

== Championships records ==
=== Men ===
| Event | Record | Athlete/Team | Date | Place | Ref. |
|---|---|---|---|---|---|
| 200 m | 20.30 (+0.1 m/s) NR | Paul Hession | 21 July 2007 | Dublin | |
| 10,000 m walk (track) | 38:27.57 NR | Robert Heffernan | 21 July 2008 | Santry | |
| 20,000 m walk (track) | 1:23:51.12 NR | Bobby O'Leary | 14 July 1991 | Santry | |

=== Women ===
| Event | Record | Athlete/Team | Date | Place | Ref. |
|---|---|---|---|---|---|
| 100 m | 11.13 (+0.7 m/s) NR | Rhasidat Adeleke | 30 June 2024 | Dublin | |
| 200 m | | | | | |
| Discus throw | 57.60 m | Patricia Walsh | 7 July 1984 | Dublin | |
| Hammer throw | 73.21 m NR | Eileen O'Keeffe | 21 July 2007 | Dublin | |
| Javelin throw | 54.92 m NR | Anita Fitzgibbon | 27 July 2013 | Dublin | |
| 5000 m walk (track) | 20:02.60 NR | Gillian O'Sullivan | 13 July 2002 | Santry | |

== See also ==
- Irish Indoor Athletics Championships
- List of Irish records in athletics
- List of athletics tracks in Ireland
