= Athletics Ireland =

Governing body for athletics on the island of Ireland

Athletics Ireland (Athletic Association of Ireland)
- Sport: Athletics
- Abbreviation: AAI
- Founded: 1885
- Affiliation: World Athletics
- Regional affiliation: EAA
- Headquarters: Dublin, Ireland
- President: John Cronin

Official website
- www.athleticsireland.ie
- (Republic of Ireland)

Athletics Ireland, officially the Athletic Association of Ireland (AAI), is the governing body for athletics in the Republic of Ireland, with athletics defined as including track and field athletics, road running, race walking, cross country running, mountain running and ultra distance running. The organisation's jurisdiction covers the whole island of Ireland (Northern Ireland is also covered by the jurisdiction of UK Athletics) and it is affiliated to the International Association of Athletic Federations. Its remit is to promote athletics from recreational running, schools competitions and to support elite athletes in international competitions.

The association has provincial councils in each of Ireland's four provinces, and county boards in the majority of Ireland's 32 traditional counties.

== History ==
The AAI in its present form was established in 2000, but the history of sports governing bodies in Ireland is complicated because of the partition of the country in 1923. In 1884 the Gaelic Athletic Association (GAA) was formed and the Irish Amateur Athletic Association (IAAA) was formed in 1885. The Cross County Association of Ireland (CCAI) was established in 1886 and later became a subsidiary of the IAAA. In 1923 the National Athletic and Cycling Association (NACA) was established merging the IAAA, the CCAI, and the Athletics Council of the GAA, with the GAA thenceforth concentrating on Gaelic games. The NACA was then admitted to membership of the IAAF. In July 1924 the Northern Ireland Amateur Athletic, Cycling and Cross Country Association (NIAAA) was formed over a dispute concerning an Easter Monday athletics meeting in Belfast, breaking away from the NACA. The Amateur Athletic Association (AAA) accepted this breakaway group under its jurisdiction.

The IAAF adopted an amendment to its constitution in 1930 which defined member organisations as being contiguous with political entities. The NACA rejected this ruling and was suspended from the IAAF. In 1937 some clubs seceded from the NACA to set up the Irish Amateur Athletic Union (IAAU) and this body became a member of the IAAF the following year while the NACA's suspension was made permanent. NACA later changed their name to the National Athletic and Cultural Association of Ireland (NACAI).

The IAAU became the Amateur Athletic Union of Eire (AAUE) which represented Ireland at subsequent Olympic games. In 1967 Bord Lúthchleas na hÉireann (BLE) was formed.

In 1987, and with improved north-south relations, BLE and NACAI signed an agreement allowing athletes affiliated to both bodies to represent Ireland. BLE and NACAI dissolved completely in 2000 to form the Athletics Association of Ireland (Athletics Ireland).

== Kit suppliers ==
Ireland's kits are currently supplied by German sports brand Adidas.

== See also ==
- Irish Athletics Championships
- List of athletics tracks in Ireland
- Irish Indoor Athletics Championships
- List of Irish records in athletics
