= Community Stadium =

Community Stadium may refer to:

- American Express Community Stadium
- Brentford Community Stadium
- Brick Community Stadium
- Colchester Community Stadium
- Donegal Community Stadium
- Falkirk Community Stadium
- Hilken Community Stadium
- Kyperounda Community Stadium
- Laithwaite Community Stadium
- Merseyrail Community Stadium
- Midland Community Stadium
- Moston Community Stadium
- Psevdas Community Stadium
- Salford Community Stadium
- Toughsheet Community Stadium
- University of Lethbridge Community Stadium
- VBS Community Stadium
- York Community Stadium
