= Cathal Doyle =

Irish athlete (born 1997)

Personal information
- Nationality: Irish
- Born: 12 November 1997 (age 28)

Sport
- Sport: Athletics
- Event: Middle distance running
- Club: Clonliffe Harriers

Achievements and titles
- Personal bests: 800m: 1:48.51 (Belfast, 2023); 1500m: 3:32.15 (Rome, 2025); Mile: 3:52.06 (Dublin, 2024); 3000m: 8:02.28 (Sheffield, 2024)

Cathal Doyle OLY (born 12 November 1997) is an Irish middle-distance runner. He is a multiple-time Irish champion over 1500 metres. He competed at the 2024 Olympic Games.

== Biography ==
From Swords in County Dublin, he runs for Clonliffe Harriers Athletic Club. He attended the University of Portland in the United States. He ran a sub-four-minute mile at the Morton Mile in 2022, despite competing with a fractured elbow and broken wrist.

Doyle won back-to-back outdoor titles in 2022 and 2023 at the Irish Athletics Championships over 1500 metres, winning his first national senior title in a time of 3:59.36, and his second in 3:40.11. He competed for the Irish team at the 2023 European Athletics Team Championships held in Chorzów, Silesia, Poland between 20 and 25 June 2023, finishing second in his 1500 metres in 3.43.36.

In February 2024, he edged out Nick Griggs with a dive on the line to win the 1500m final at the Irish Indoor Athletics Championships at Abbotstown. In June 2024, he won the Irish Athletics Championships 1500 metres title in Dublin. He set a new personal best of 3:52.06 for the mile run in Dublin, in July 2024. He competed at the 2024 Summer Olympics over 1500 metres, reaching the semi-final with a win in the repechage round. In his semi-final he placed tenth and did not proceed to the final.

He won the metric mile at the Irish Indoor Athletics Championship at Abbotstown on 23 February 2025. He was named as part of the Irish team for the 2025 European Athletics Indoor Championships in Apeldoorn. He tripped in the heats of the 1500 metres and despite finishing the race in a solo time trial, he was unsuccessful in his appeal to be reinstated. He ran a new personal best of 3:32.15 in the 1500 metres at the Diamond League event at the 2025 Golden Gala in Rome on 6 June 2025. He won the 1500m at the 2025 Irish Athletics Championships. In September 2025, he competed at the 2025 World Championships in Tokyo, Japan, without advancing to the semi-finals.

In July 2026, Doyle's attempt for a fifth consecutive Irish 1500 metres title was ended as he placed second to Andrew Coscoran in 3:44.79. In August, he competed at the 2026 European Athletics Championships in Birmingham, England, in the 1500 metres.
