= Josh Cullen =

Josh Cullen may refer to:

- Josh Cullen (musician) (born 1993), Filipino singer and songwriter
- Josh Cullen (footballer, born 1996), Irish footballer
- Josh Cullen (footballer, born 2008), Irish footballer
