= Corey Sheridan =

Irish footballer (born 2008)

Personal information
- Full name: Corey Cummins-Sheridan
- Date of birth: 6 June 2008 (age 18)
- Place of birth: Ballyshannon, County Donegal
- Height: 1.83 m (6 ft 0 in)
- Position: Goalkeeper

Team information
- Current team: Finn Harps
- Number: 1

Youth career
- Erne Wanderers
- 2022–2025: Finn Harps

Senior career*
Years	Team	Apps	(Gls)
2025–	Finn Harps	19	(0)

International career^{‡}
2025	Republic of Ireland U17	1	(0)
- * Club domestic league appearances and goals as of 22:57, 19 September 2026 (UTC) ‡ National team caps and goals as of 22:57, 19 September 2026 (UTC)

Corey Cummins-Sheridan (born 6 June 2008) is an Irish professional footballer who plays as a goalkeeper for League of Ireland First Division club Finn Harps and represents the Republic of Ireland at youth international level.

Sheridan played youth football with Erne Wanderers before joining Finn Harps in 2022. He made his debut for the club when he was 17 and has been playing in goals frequently ever since.

Sheridan originally represented Northern Ireland at U17 level before switching to the Republic of Ireland in 2025, whom he would go on to represent at the FIFA U-17 World Cup.

== Early life ==
Sheridan played GAA with Aodh Ruadh CLG, from which he was selected to represent Ulster GAA in 2024.

== Club career ==
=== Finn Harps ===
On 13 September 2024, Sheridan was included on the bench for League of Ireland First Division club Finn Harps in a game against Longford Town.

Sheridan was signed to a senior contract for the 2025 season, alongside teammates Adam McDaid and Josh Cullen. On 20 June 2025, Sheridan made his debut for the club against Athlone Town. Sheridan kept four straight clean sheets in his first four games in goals for Finn Harps.

Sheridan re-signed for the club for the 2026 season.

== International career ==
=== Northern Ireland ===
On 14 March 2025, Sheridan was named in the Northern Ireland U17 squad for their 2025 U17 Euro qualifiers, where he was the second-choice keeper behind Finn McDonnell.

=== Republic of Ireland ===
On 1 September 2025, Sheridan was called up to the Republic of Ireland U17 squad for the first time having made the switch from Northern Ireland. On 7 September, he made his debut for the side in a 3–0 win over Turkey. Sheridan was included in the squad that travelled to the 2025 FIFA U-17 World Cup alongside Finn Harps teammates, Josh Cullen and Gavin McAteer. Sheridan was Ireland's third-choice keeper at the tournament behind Alex Noonan and George Moloney.

Sheridan was called up to the Republic of Ireland U19 squad in March 2026, but had to withdraw due to injury.

== Career statistics ==
=== Club ===
As of match played 18 September 2026

Appearances and goals by club, season and competition
Club	Season	League			National cup (Note: Includes FAI Cup)		Total	
Club	Season	Division	Apps	Goals	Apps	Goals	Apps	Goals
Finn Harps	2024	LOI First Division	0	0	0	0	0	0
Finn Harps	2025	LOI First Division	7	0	1	0	8	0
Finn Harps	2026	LOI First Division	12	0	0	0	12	0
Finn Harps	Total		19	0	1	0	20	0
Career total			19	0	1	0	20	0
