= Gavin McAteer =

Irish footballer (born 2008)

Personal information
- Date of birth: 2 July 2008 (age 18)
- Place of birth: Milford, County Donegal, Ireland
- Height: 1.72 m (5 ft 8 in)
- Position: Attacking midfielder

Team information
- Current team: Finn Harps
- Number: 11

Youth career
- Milford United
- 2017–2024: Finn Harps

Senior career*
Years	Team	Apps	(Gls)
2024–	Finn Harps	77	(5)

International career^{‡}
2025	Republic of Ireland U17	12	(0)
2026–	Republic of Ireland U19	8	(1)
- * Club domestic league appearances and goals as of 16:10, 11 November 2025 (UTC) ‡ National team caps and goals as of 14:41, 15 November 2026 (UTC)

Gavin McAteer (born 2 July 2008) is an Irish professional footballer who plays as an attacking midfielder for League of Ireland First Division club Finn Harps. He also plays at youth international level for the Republic of Ireland.

McAteer joined Finn Harps from his local club Milford United when he was only 9 years old, making his senior debut for the at the age of 15.

McAteer is a Republic of Ireland youth international and has represented Ireland at the FIFA U-17 World Cup.

== Club career ==
=== Finn Harps ===
On 24 May 2024, McAteer made his debut for League of Ireland First Division club Finn Harps at the age of 15 years and 327 days, making him the youngest player to ever feature in the League of Ireland for the club. On 3 June, McAteer came on for the last ten minutes in his first game at Finn Park, where he assisted an 89th-minute equaliser to secure a 1–1 draw against Athlone Town. On 3 July, McAteer signed his first professional contract with the club.

During 2025, McAteer spent time on trial with Premier League club Nottingham Forest and Scottish Premiership side Celtic. On 22 September 2025, McAteer scored his first goal for the club in a 1–3 defeat against Wexford.

On 13 March 2026, McAteer got a goal and an assist to go from 0–2 down to a 2–2 draw against Treaty United.

== International career ==
On 12 February 2025, McAteer made his debut for the Republic of Ireland U17s in a friendly against Finland. McAteer was included in the Republic of Ireland squad for the 2025 FIFA U-17 World Cup alongside Finn Harps teammates, Josh Cullen and Corey Sheridan. McAteer featured twice in the tournament as Ireland topped their gorup and made it to the Round of 16.

On 25 March 2026, McAteer made his debut for the Republic of Ireland U19s, drawing 1–1 against Poland in a 2027 U19 Euros qualifier.

== Career statistics ==
=== Club ===
As of match played 18 October 2026

Appearances and goals by club, season and competition
Club	Season	League			National cup (Note: Includes FAI Cup)		Total	
Club	Season	Division	Apps	Goals	Apps	Goals	Apps	Goals
Finn Harps	2024	LOI First Division	15	0	1	0	16	0
Finn Harps	2025	LOI First Division	30	1	2	0	32	1
Finn Harps	2026	LOI First Division	32	4	1	0	33	4
Finn Harps	Total		77	5	4	0	81	5
Career total			77	5	4	0	81	5
