= St Tiernach's Park =

GAA stadium in Clones, Ireland

- Páirc Thiarnaigh Naofa
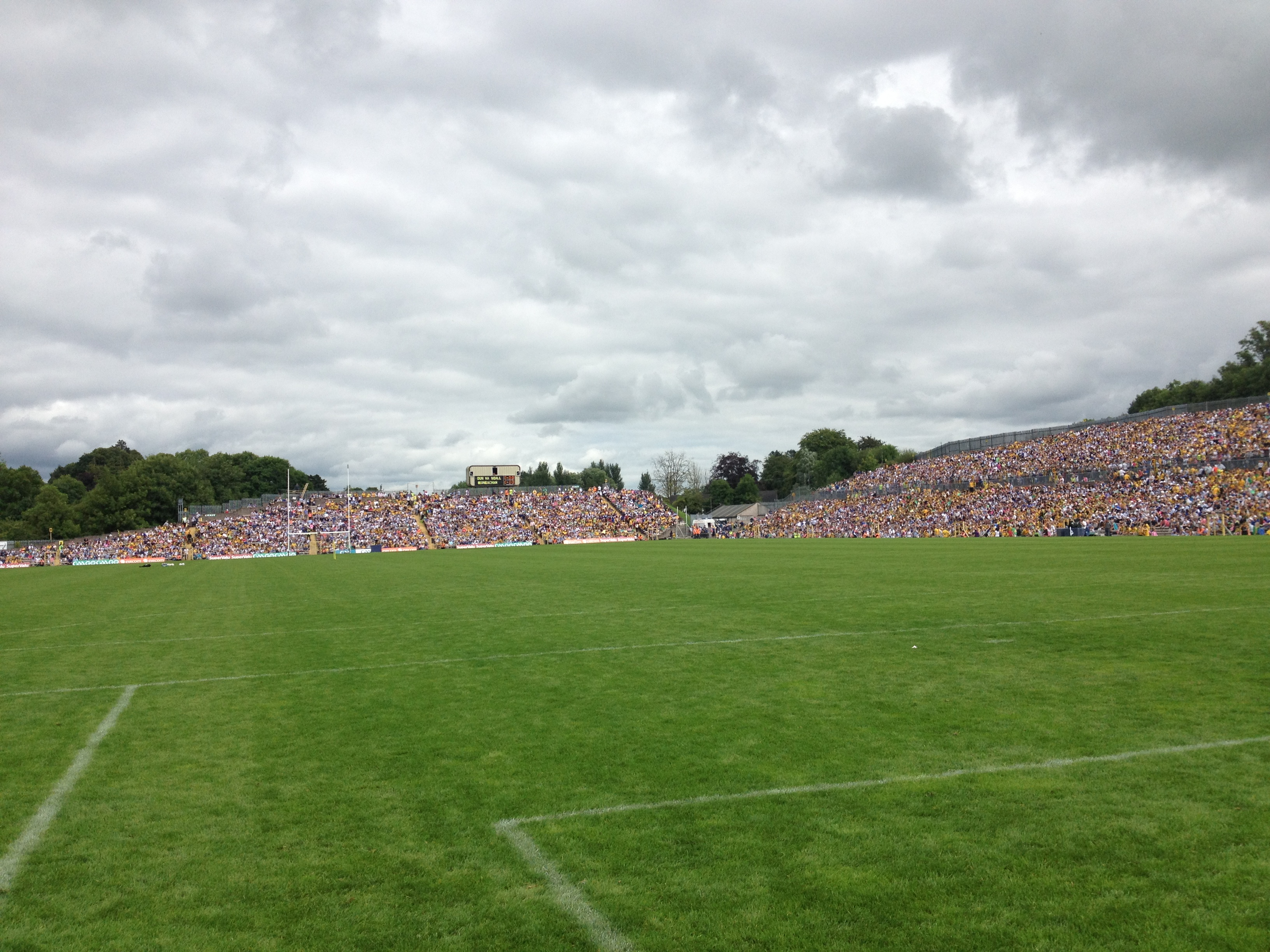
- Interactive map of St Tiernach's Park
- Address: 25 Roslea Terrace, Largy, County Monaghan, H23 AH74
- Location: Ireland
- Coordinates: 54°11′8″N 7°13′58″W
- Owner: Clones GAA Monaghan GAA Ulster GAA
- Capacity: 29,000 Capacity history: 36,500 29,000 (2019–present)
- Field size: 142 x 87 m
- Public transit: Jubilee Road bus stop

Construction
- Opened: 1944
- Renovated: 1992/93
- Cost: IR£4.5 million

Tenant
- Monaghan GAA

St Tiernach's Park is the principal GAA stadium of Ulster GAA located in County Monaghan, Ireland. It is used mainly for Gaelic football.

Such is its association with the town of Clones (/ˈkloʊnɪs/ KLOH-nis), which is located to the south, that the venue itself is often referred to simply as Clones. With a current capacity of 29,000, it hosts major Gaelic football matches such as the Ulster Senior Football Championship final and is home to Clones GAA and Monaghan GAA.

== History ==
The ground is named after Saint Tiarnach (Tigearnach, d. AD 548), who founded Clones as a monastic settlement c. AD 500. From 1888 to 1943 a mixture of grounds were used as venues for the Ulster GAA Senior Football Final, the first time in Clones being 1906. The final was held at St Tiernach's Park in Clones almost continuously over the 60 years from 1943 until 2003, apart from twice in Cavan, and 8 times at Casement Park in Belfast. Between 2004 and 2006, due to increased capacity, the Ulster Final was played at Croke Park in Dublin. However, with the 2007 Leinster Senior Football Championship final being scheduled for the same date, that year's Ulster Final was restored to Clones, with Tyrone narrowly defeating Monaghan by a scoreline of 1–15 to 1–13. The Ulster Final has been held in Clones every year since 2007. The capacity of St Tiernach's Park capacity was originally 36,500 spectators, but that was reduced in 2019 following a health and safety review. 2019 marked the 75th anniversary of St Tiernach's Park.

== Structure ==
The covered stand on one side of St Tiernach's Park is called the Gerry Arthurs Stand. It is named after Gerry Arthurs (1906–1991), who was treasurer of the Ulster Council for 42 years (1934 – 1976). In 2009, Arthurs was named in the Sunday Tribune's list of the 125 Most Influential People in GAA History. On the other side of the ground is the Pat McGrane Stand (seated), with The Hill (standing) behind it. The terrace behind the goals on the town side is called O'Duffy Tce, with the seating on the opposite side called the Eastern Stand.

== Facilities ==
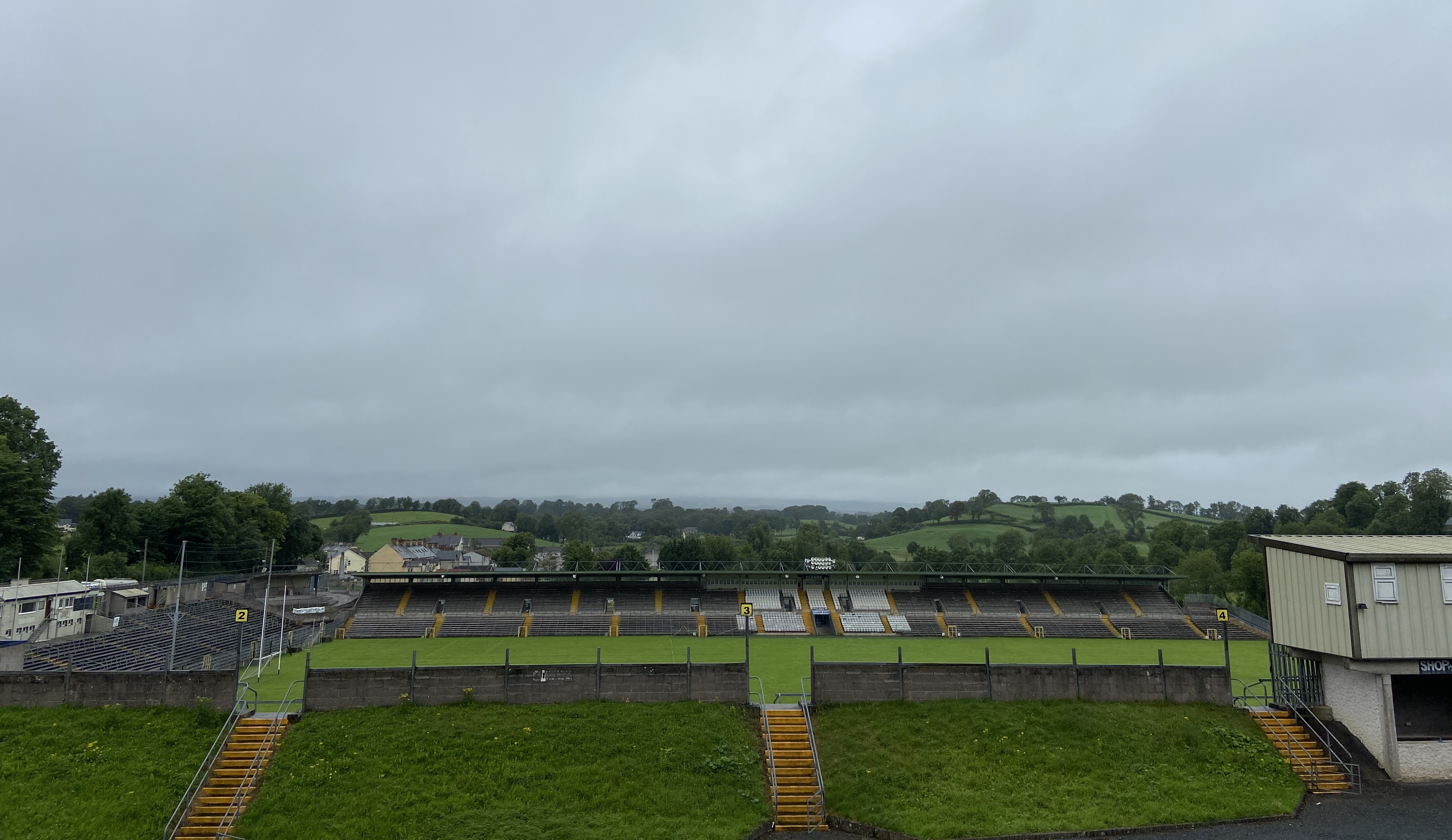
St Tiernach's Park in July 2020

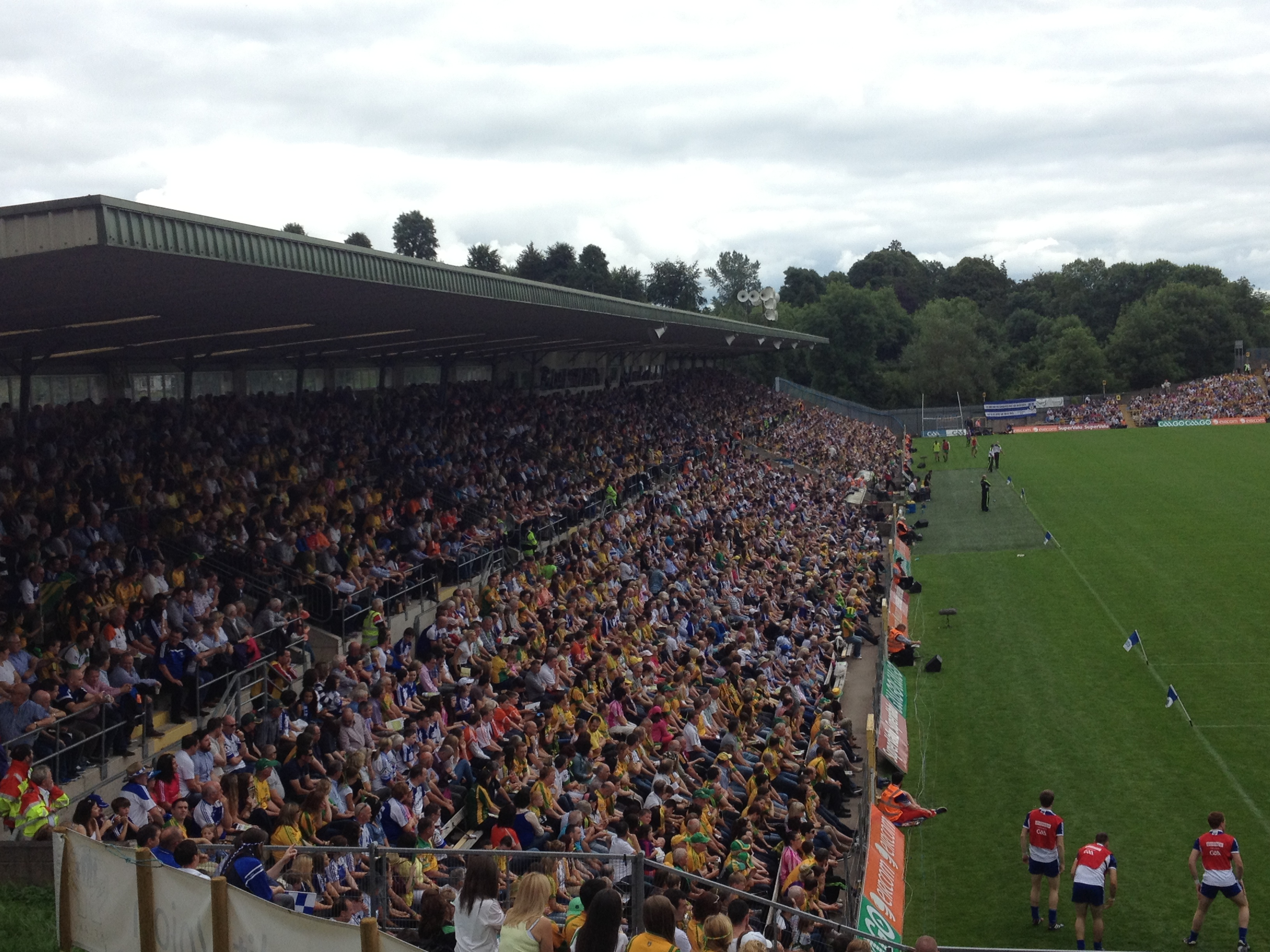
St Tiernach's Park during the 2014 Ulster Final

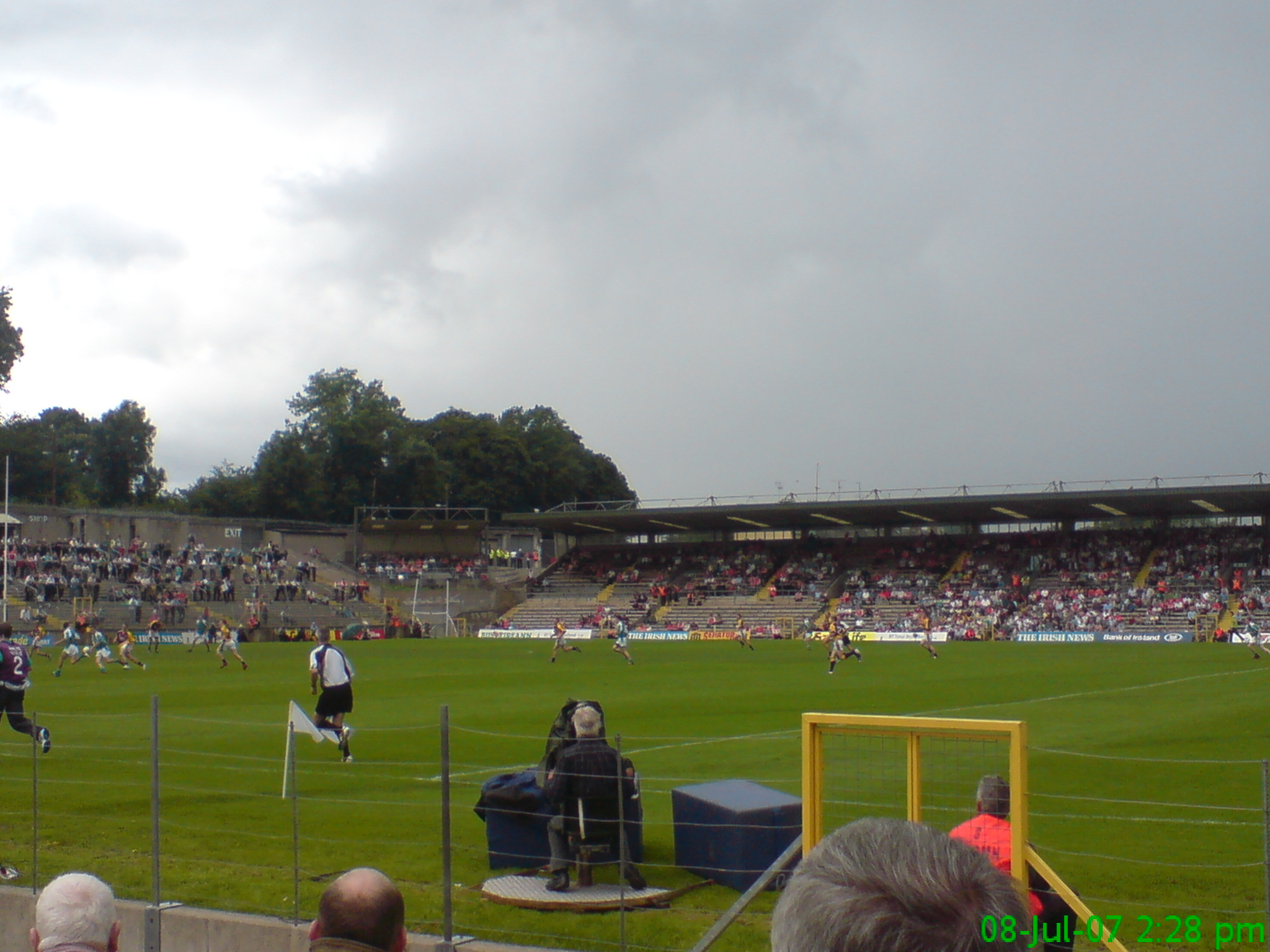
2007 GAA match

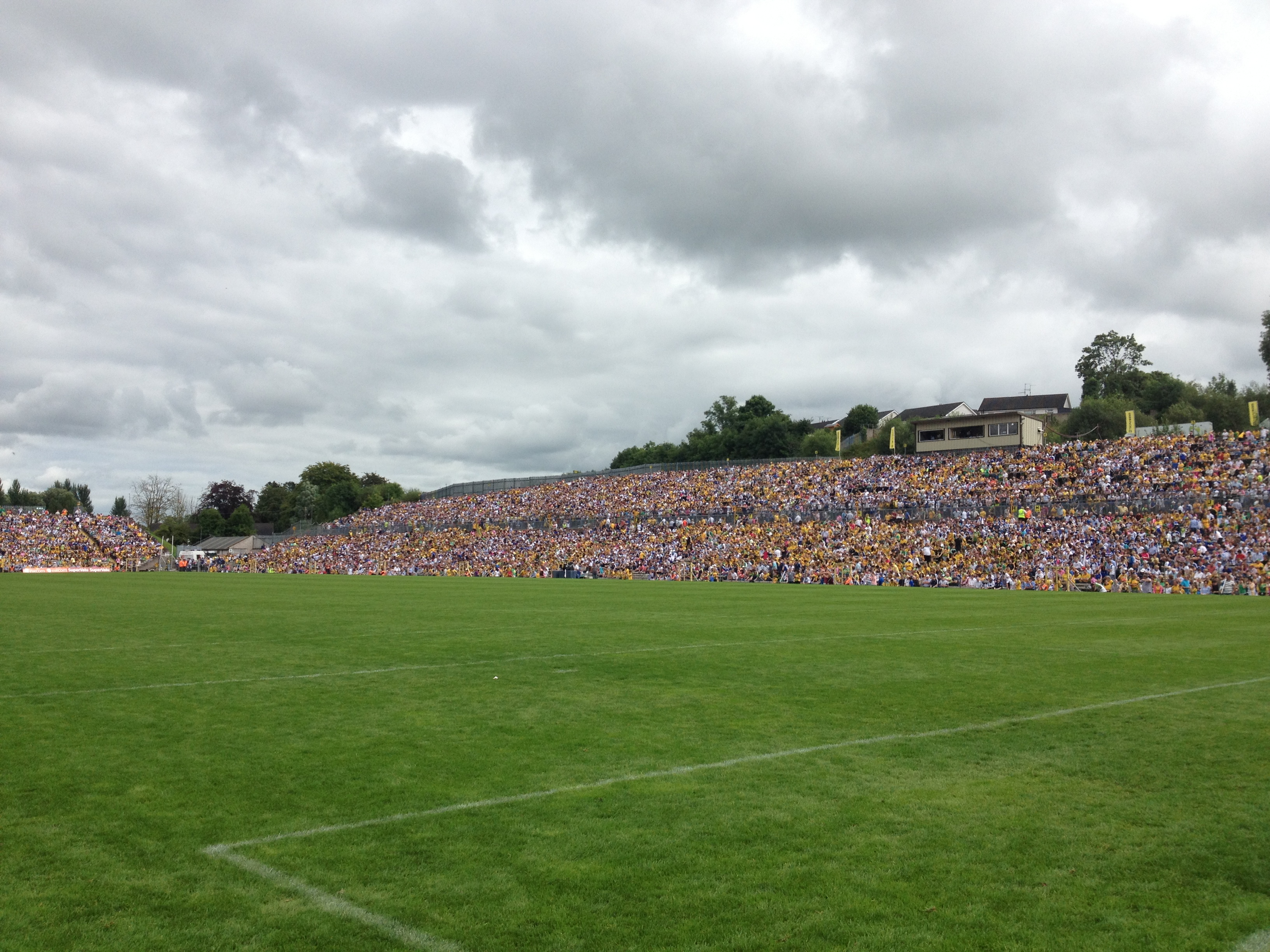
St Tiernach's Park during the 2014 Ulster Final

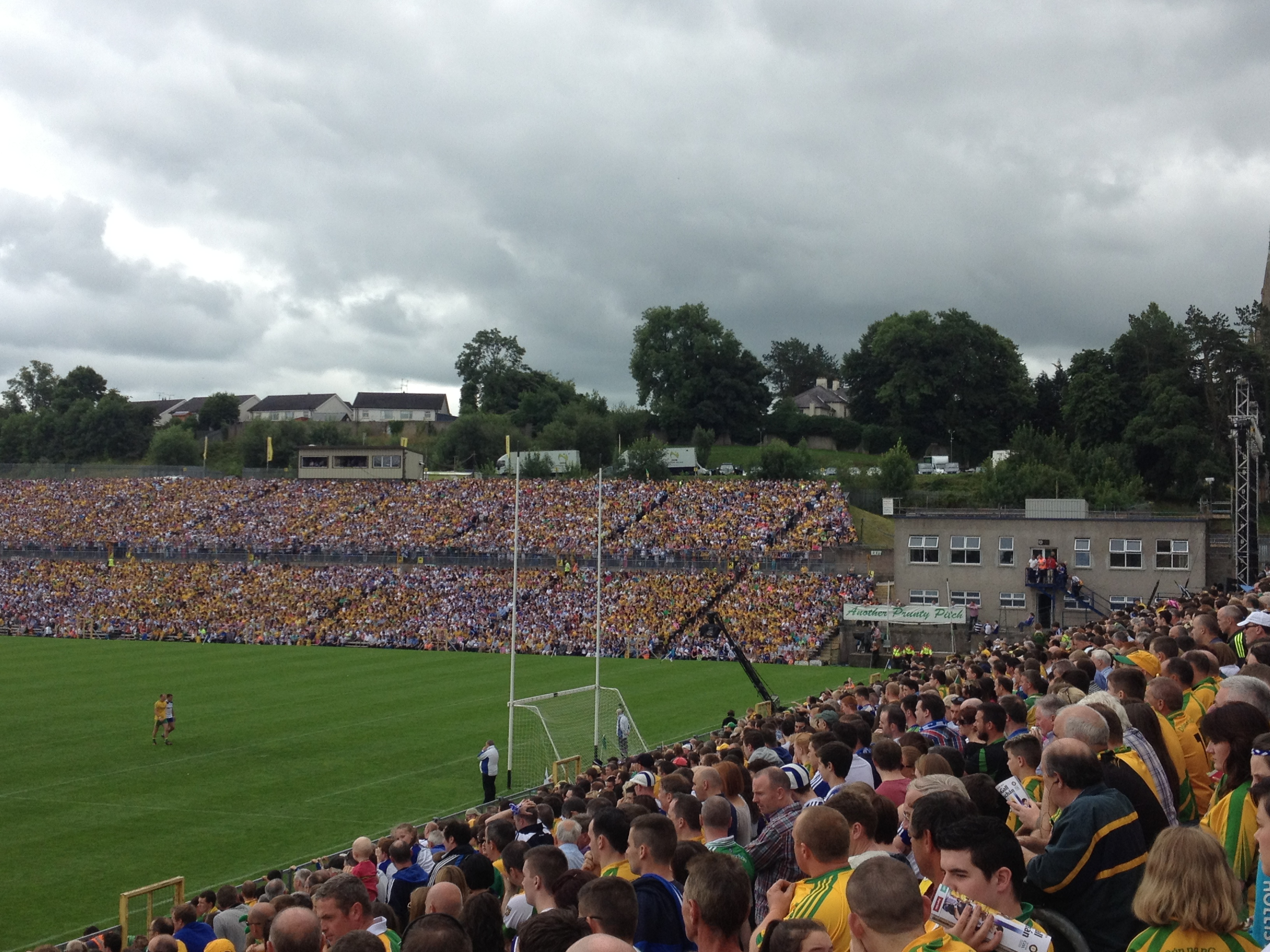
St Tiernach's Park during the 2014 Ulster Final

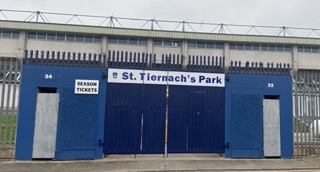
St Tiernach's Park Entrance

== See also ==
- List of Gaelic Athletic Association stadiums
- List of stadiums in Ireland by capacity
