= Irish Amateur Athletic Association =

The Irish Amateur Athletic Association or IAAA was a governing body for athletic sports in Ireland between 1885 and 1923.

The IAAA was formed as the Irish offshoot of the English Amateur Athletic Association in 1885. This was partially in reaction to the formation of the more nationalist Gaelic Athletic Association (GAA) in 1884. The Cross County Association of Ireland (CCAI) was established in 1886 and later became a subsidiary of the IAAA.

In 1923 the National Athletic and Cycling Association (NACA) was established merging the IAAA, the CCAI, and the Athletics Council of the GAA, with the GAA thenceforth concentrating on Gaelic games.
