= National Athletic and Cycling Association =

Federation of athletics and cycling clubs in Ireland

The National Athletic and Cycling Association (NACA or N.A. and C.A.), from 1990 the National Athletic and Cycling Association of Ireland (NACAI or NACA(I)) was a federation of sports clubs in the island of Ireland practising athletics or bicycle racing or both. It existed from 1922 to 2000, though for most of the period it was not the sole governing body in Ireland for either sport. Its refusal to recognise the partition of Ireland got it expelled from the International Amateur Athletics Federation (IAAF) and the Union Cycliste Internationale (UCI). Clubs formerly in the NACAI are now affiliated to Athletics Ireland or Cycling Ireland, each formed by the merger of the NACAI with rival bodies respectively affiliated to the IAAF and the UCI.

== Foundation ==
The NACA was formed on 19 July 1922, from a merger of the Irish Amateur Athletic Association or IAAA (including its subsidiary the Cross Country Association of Ireland), the Irish Cycling Association (ICA) and the Athletics Council of the Gaelic Athletic Association (GAA). The GAA was Irish nationalist and mainly rural, while the IAAA and ICA members were mainly unionists, universities, and the urban middle class. The IAAA was linked to the Amateur Athletic Association of England (AAA).

The unionist-dominated Northern Ireland and the nationalist Irish Free State had recently been separated politically, and the GAA was prepared to surrender its authority to ensure national unity in athletics and cycling and avoid a division which would reinforce the reality of partition. The GAA after 1923 thus restricted itself to Gaelic games, ceding athletics and cycling to NACA, with which it remained on friendly terms. John J. Keane, previously Chairman of the GAA Athletic Council, became first NACA President. Whereas the GAA had a ban on members of the RUC and British Army, the NACA narrowly voted not to introduce such a measure.

The NACA affiliated to the IAAF on 11 January 1924, and sent teams to the Olympics of 1924, 1928, and 1932. It also sent five athletes to the 1930 British Empire Games in Canada. In each case, the team was claimed to represent "Ireland" rather than the Irish Free State.

In 1937, the National Cycling Association (NCA) was formed as a NACA subsidiary for cycling clubs, and affiliated to the UCI. The Rás Tailteann was its headline event, an 8-day stage race whose name reflected the Tailteann Games.

== Splits and isolation ==
Already by 1925 there was a split, with the Northern Ireland Amateur Athletic, Cycling and Cross Country Association (NIAAA) formed over a dispute concerning an Easter Monday sports meeting in Belfast, which as well as athletics featured greyhound racing and associated betting, which had been allowed by the IAAA but not by NACA. Since the meeting was to raise funds for Belfast Celtic F.C., with an Irish nationalist fanbase, the NACA alienated nationalists as well as unionists in Belfast. The NIAAA affiliated to the English AAA in 1930, with its unionist president Thomas Moles encouraging links within the UK, and Dawson Bates, the NI Home Affairs minister, lobbying the AAA.

In 1931, Eoin O'Duffy was president of the NACA, and raised at the IAAF the dispute with the British AAA over jurisdiction over Northern Ireland. The IAAF deferred a decision till its conference at the 1932 Olympics. In the meantime O'Duffy tried to resolve the matter by proposing an Irish Amateur Athletic Union (IAAU) in negotiations between NACA and the NIAAA, to have an agreed flag containing the arms of the four provinces on a background of St Patrick's Blue. However, the proposal foundered when an NACA general meeting insisted that the flag used at international events be the Irish tricolour rather than the IAAU flag. The IAAF decided in 1932 not to intervene in the Northern jurisdiction dispute.

In 1934, the IAAF amended its constitution to require member associations to be delimited by international political boundaries. After a year's delay, the NACA council voted 24 to 27 to reject the IAAF decision and was suspended the following month. There was no Irish team at the 1936 Olympics, other Irish sports boycotting in solidarity with the NACA exclusion. In 1937, some clubs in the Irish Free State left NACA and formed an Irish Amateur Athletic Union (IAAU, the same name as the abortive 1932 proposal) whose remit excluded Northern Ireland. The IAAU applied to join the IAAF, but due to British objections to the name "Ireland" was required to rename itself the Amateur Athletic Union of Éire (AAUE). AAUE affiliation in 1938 meant the NACA was definitively expelled from the IAAF. Most Irish athletics clubs remained in NACA, and it was NACA that was affiliated to the Irish Olympic Council, though it was AAUE athletes who competed at the Olympics. Ronnie Delany's gold medal in the 1956 1500 m was not mentioned at the next NACA executive meeting. In 1959, Tom O'Riordan's scholarship with the Idaho State Bengals was jeopardised when he ran for his local NACA club while visiting home in Tralee. The AAUE, whose Secretary Louis Vandendries was on holiday, reported him to the IAAF, which suspended him; upon Vandendries' return he defused the controversy by informing the IAAF that O'Riordan was now in good standing with the AAUE.

The UCI emulated the IAAF in 1947 by requiring the NCA to disclaim Northern Ireland, expelling it when it refused. In 1949, several clubs broke away from the NCA to form Cumann Rothaíochta na hÉireann (CRE), which would restrict its area of jurisdiction to the Republic of Ireland. The CRE was recognised by the UCI, as was the Northern Ireland Cycling Federation (NICF), formed the same year and linked to the British Cycling Federation. The CRE and NICF co-operated and organised the Tour of Ireland, which attracted fewer Irish cyclists than the NCA's Rás Tailteann but more from abroad. A joint CRE–NICF Ireland team competed in international events, from which the NCA was excluded. Rogue NCA teams joined the 1955 amateur world road race championship and the 1972 Olympics road race in protest at their exclusion.

The GAA had always co-operated with the NACA, and its ban on members playing British sports was extended to ban those competing in athletics and cycling events not authorised by the NACA. The NACA retained some international links, through the International Labour Sports Federation (CSIT). Joe Christle, NCA official and organiser of the Rás Tailteann, was both a socialist and physical force republican.

== Dissolution ==
In 1979, the Irish Cycling Tripartite Committee (ICTC) was formed to link the NCA, NICF, and ICF (Irish Cycling Federation, the successor to the CRE). In 1987 all three merged into the Federation of Irish Cyclists (FIC), now operating as Cycling Ireland.

After many failed attempts at unification, Bord Luthchleas na hÉireann (BLÉ) was formed in 1967 by the merger of the AAUE and most clubs of the NACA. However, some NACA clubs refused to join BLÉ, though in 1987 the rump NACA reached agreement with BLÉ allowing joint international representation. The GAA officially tolerated BLÉ, but some county boards refused to co-operate with it, and the rule favouring the NACA was not repealed.

In 2000, both bodies were dissolved into the Athletics Association of Ireland, which forms Athletics Ireland together with the NIAAA.

== Presidents ==
The presidents of the NACA were:

Years	President	Notes
1922–29	John J. Keane	Also founded the Irish Olympic Council
1929–31	Eamonn N.M. O'Sullivan	
1931–33	Eoin O'Duffy	Then Garda Síochána Commissioner; also founded the Blueshirts
1933–34	Donal Barrett	
1934–36	Patrick C. Moore	
1936–40	Francis J. O'Dea	
1940–41	Myles J. Byrne	
1942–44	Eoin O'Duffy	
1944–54	Thomas Cullen	
1954–57	Sean Toomey	
1957–67	Thomas McDonagh	A chief superintendent in the Garda Síochána
1967–69	Edward P. Stanley	
1969–71	David Browne	
1971–73	Denis O'Brien	
1973–76	Liam Simpson	
1976–78	Patrick Crehan	
1978–81	John Hassett	
1981–82	Frank McEvoy	
1982–85	Paddy Desmond	
1985–88	Brian Kirk	
1988–90	James Kelly	
1990–91	Brian Vallely	
1991–95	Donal Webb	
1995–97	Rita Brady	
1997–99	Michael Heery	
