= Finn Harps F.C. =

Finn Harps
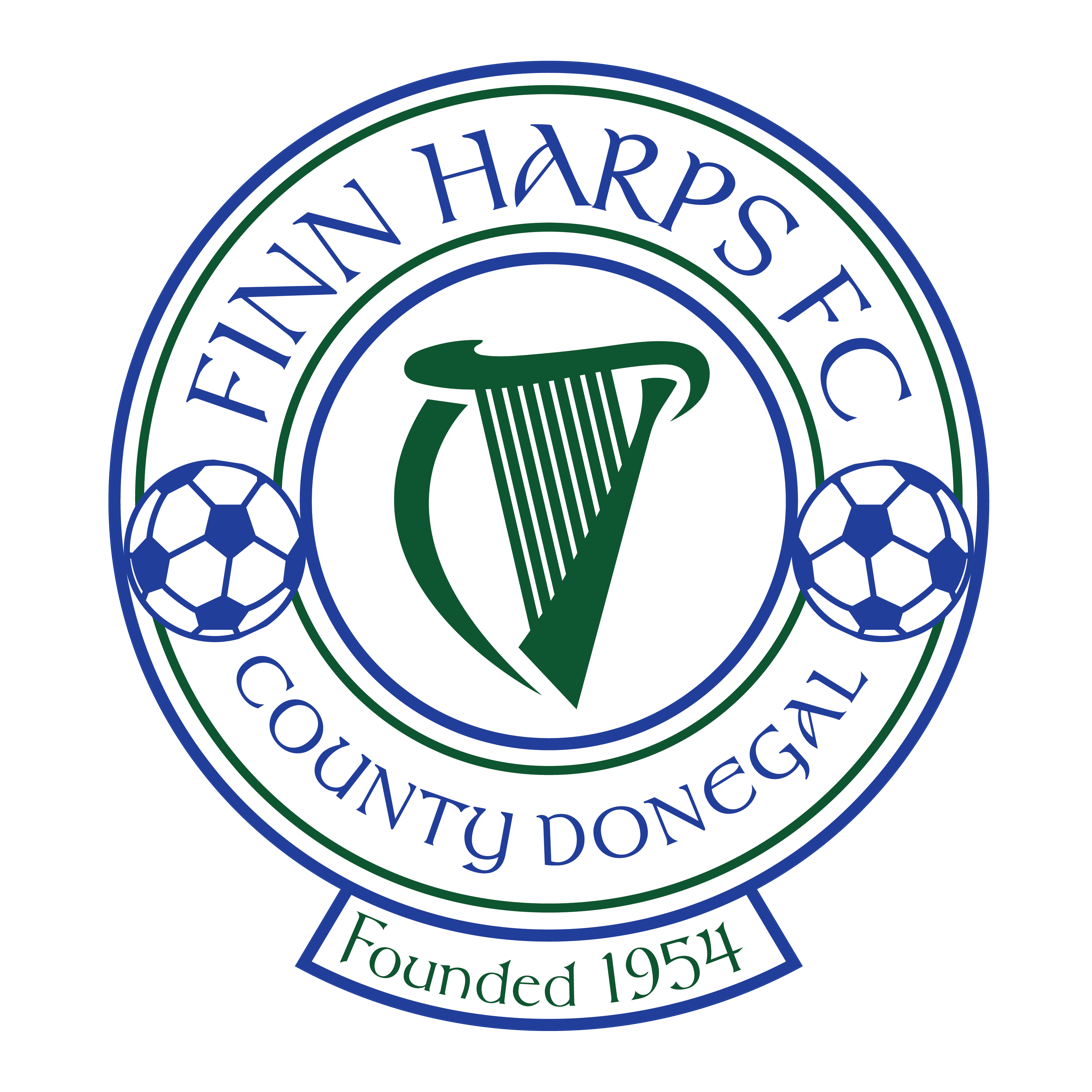
- Full name: Finn Harps Football Club
- Nickname: The Harps
- Short name: Finn Harps
- Founded: 1954; 72 years ago
- Ground: Finn Park, Ballybofey, County Donegal
- Capacity: 4,458 (351 seated)
- Chairman: Ian Harkin
- Manager: Patrick McEleney (interim)
- League: League of Ireland First Division
- 2026: League of Ireland First Division, 10th of 10
- Website: www.finnharps.ie
Home colours	Away colours

Finn Harps Football Club is a fan-owned Irish football club that plays in the First Division of the League of Ireland, as of 2023. The club was founded in 1954 and elected to the league in 1969. They hail from Ballybofey, County Donegal and play their home matches at Finn Park in Ballybofey. The club's colours are blue and white, and they go by the nickname Harps. The main successes of the club include winning an FAI Cup in 1973–74 and the First Division title in 2004. They also contested the 1999 FAI Cup Final, a second replay of which ended in a narrow defeat, the first replay having been lost to a draw with 30 seconds left to play.

Finn Harps share a local rivalry with Derry City with whom they contest the Northwest Derby.

== History ==
=== Early years ===
Finn Harps was formed in 1954 as a junior club. The club's name derives from the river that runs through Ballybofey – the River Finn – and a traditional Irish symbol – the harp. They first came to national prominence by winning the 1968 FAI Junior Cup. This enabled them to compete in the 1969 FAI Intermediate Cup. After they were knocked out of that competition, club directors Fran Fields and Patsy McGowan decided to apply to the League of Ireland for membership. The club was admitted into the senior ranks in May 1969 and played their first senior game against Shamrock Rovers on 17 August 1969. They lost the game 10–2. After initial worries that the club were not of sufficient standard, the club became a considerable force during the 1970s.

=== 1970s: A decade of dominance ===
Chart of yearly table positions for Finn Harps in League of Ireland

Finn Harps won their first senior trophy, the Dublin City Cup, in 1971–72, after a goal from club legend and all-time League of Ireland record goalscorer Brendan Bradley defeated Cork Hibernians at Dalymount Park. This was significant as before others had dismissed the idea of Finn Harps in the league. Two years later, Dalymount Park was again the scene as the club secured its first and only FAI Cup win. Two goals from Brendan Bradley and one from Charlie Ferry saw off the challenge of St Patrick's Athletic. Finn Harps qualified for European competitions on four occasions during the 1970s. They appeared in the UEFA Cup three times against Aberdeen, Derby County and Everton respectively, after finishing as runners-up in the league. They appeared once in the European Cup Winners Cup, playing Turkish Cup winners Bursaspor. The club was again runner-up in the League of Ireland Cup finals of 1974 and 1975 to Waterford and Bohemians respectively. Through the 1970s, the club never once finished in the bottom half of the table and were widely respected for their attractive and attacking football style. The 1974 final was the first to be broadcast in colour.

=== Slow decline ===
The 1980s saw a gradual decline of the club when it came to competing against the best in Ireland. An FAI Cup semi-final in 1981 and a League of Ireland First Division Shield final defeat by EMFA were the highlights of the decade for them and by 1985 the club had been relegated to the newly formed First Division. A series of managerial changes occurred over the following few years in an attempt to raise the club's status, but signs of improvement did not appear until the early 1990s. Patsy McGowan took over as manager for the third time at the start of the 1992–93 season. The next three seasons saw the club finish in the play-off position twice, though they were beaten both times (once by Cobh Ramblers and once by Athlone Town). The club let McGowan go before his aim of promotion could be completed. Following this the club's fortunes improved.

Nevertheless, Finn Harps won promotion at the end of the 1995–96 season, thus bringing an end to end their 11-season spell in the First Division. During the summer of 1996, a consortium of businessmen offered to take control of the club, but - when their offer was rejected - the manager and certain members of the club committee resigned. The club appointed Charlie McGeever as manager and, despite time being against him, he managed to assemble a squad for the opening of the 1996–97 season. By the season's conclusion, he had ensured that the club's Premier Division status was retained. Off the field, the remaining committee members set the club up as a co-operative society, selling shares to the ordinary supporters, to ensure that the club would be owned and run by the people whom they felt would truly care about it. A long-term blueprint for the future was put in place.

In 1998–99, Finn Harps finished fourth in the Premier Division; one point behind Shelbourne in third position and just missed out on Europe. They made it to the 1999 FAI Cup Final but lost to Bray Wanderers after a number of replays, leaving themselves with nothing to show (bar the Irish News Cup) for what is considered to be one of their most impressive seasons. After a very poor start to the 1999–00 season, and with the team having won one point from a possible 21, McGeever resigned as manager. The club appointed Gavin Dykes as manager and, though he managed to retain the club's Premier Division status, they were forced to go public company due to financial difficulties and debts amounting to £280,000. The following season, and after an abysmal run of results, Dykes resigned. Fan-favourite Jonathan Speak took his place as new financial structures were put into place and a newly appointed fund-raising committee established along with numerous supporter clubs around the country. However, after a run of 14 games undefeated and a late-season fightback, Finn Harps were ultimately relegated to the First Division on the last day of the season. This ended a five-year run in the top flight.

=== The yo-yo years ===
Speak's first full season in charge saw the club finish second to Drogheda United in the First Division, thus securing them a play-off place for promotion. Longford Town beat them on penalties. The following season saw the club finish third and lose at the play-off semi-final stage to Galway United. Speak managed to hold most of the squad together, despite their top-scorer Kevin McHugh (who formed a successful forward partnership with English striker Damien Whitehead) attracting the interest of several Premier Division clubs. Considered bookmaker's favourites to lift the 2003 title and win promotion, Finn Harps began well but fell to fourth position after having gone without a win for a month by mid-September. This poor run included a home-loss to the neighbouring northwest club Sligo Rovers and a home-draw against league leaders Dublin City, the latter game billed as a must-win match. Despite losing only two games for the entire season, the nine draws cost Speak his job. Speak's assistant, Sean McGowan, took temporary charge until a suitable placement was found and steadied the club with two wins from two. Approaching the final third of the season, the club appointed Noel King as manager. They were rejuvenated and stormed back to the top of the First Division table with a club record-equalling six wins on the trot. With only four games remaining, Finn Harps led the table by a point but losses away to Bray Wanderers and Dublin City handed the title to Dublin City and left Finn Harps in the now-dreaded playoffs once again. They disposed of Bray Wanderers in the semi-finals but lost in the final to local rivals Derry City, who had finished ninth in that season's Premier Division.

Noel King lasted six games into the 2004 season before leaving the club by mutual consent, with the amount of travelling the Dubliner had to endure being cited as one of the main reasons for his departure. Sean McGowan, his assistant, once again took charge for two games but within ten days the club announced a shock replacement. Felix Healy, the former Derry City player and manager who had won all domestic major honours with his home-town club, would be the new manager. Fans viewed this as a bold move by the Finn Harps board of directors, considering Healy's history with the club's fiercest rivals. However, Healy - in the club's golden jubilee year - won the club's first First Division title and achieved the promotion to the Premier Division that had eluded so many managers before him. However, the following season saw the club struggle in the Premier Division and Harps sacked Healy in July. Anthony Gorman agreed to become player-manager until the end of the season. However, at the season's end and with Finn Harps relegated again, Gorman agreed to take the position on a full-time basis only to leave following the 2006 season as his efforts to lead the club to promotion failed. In 2007, after Paul Hegarty took charge of managing the team, financial difficulties that had nearly bankrupted the club some seasons earlier became more prevalent so the club - struggling in the lower half of the First Division - put all players on sale. The 2007 season started sluggishly with a number of defeats and "bore draws" (notably against Monaghan United), but a lengthy unbeaten run left the club in second place in the league, only one point behind Cobh Ramblers. They emerged as victors over Dundalk from the first round of the First Division play-off, with a 2–0 win. The first leg of the final play-off round against Waterford United ended at Finn Park with Harps taking a 3–0 advantage to the Waterford RSC ahead of the return leg, which ended 3–3. Thus, Harps secured promoted to the Premier Division 6–3 on aggregate.

In 2008, Harps began the conversion from a semi-professional, part-time club to a full-time setup over the off-season, with 16 full-time players on the books as of the opening day of the season. The conversion succeeded but relegation beckoned once again for the club, this time on the final day. Though they won their game, Galway United's win sealed the fate of Harps. In 2009, Finn Harps played in the FAI First Division, on a semi-professional basis once again. On 11 May 2009, Paul Hegarty left the club, citing "personal reasons". James Gallagher replaced Hegarty as manager. On 3 May 2011, Peter Hutton took over as manager, while former Northern Ireland international and fellow former Derry City player Felix Healy also arrived to take the role of club director of football. Following the final home game of the 2013 season (a 3–2 win against champions Athlone Town), Hutton announced his resignation as manager.

=== Rejuvenation and the 'Ollie Years' ===
On 25 November 2013, the club named Galway native and former Fanad United manager Ollie Horgan as manager for the 2014 season.

In his first season in charge, Horgan led the club to an FAI Cup semi final for the first time in 15 years, before being beaten by Premier Division side St. Patrick's Athletic in Richmond Park. The 2015 season concluded with Finn Harps securing promotion to the League of Ireland Premier Division by beating Limerick 2–1 on aggregate in a famous relegation/promotion playoff, the second leg of which occurred on 6 November 2015. Against all the odds, Horgan managed to keep Finn Harps in the Premier Division in 2016, however, in their second season back in the top flight they were relegated once again. They spent 2018 in the First Division, achieving immediate promotion - again at the expense of Limerick in the relegation/promotion play-off, though this time on a 3-0 aggregate score.

2019 saw another relegation battle, as Harps defeated Drogheda United in the relegation play-off game in Finn Park to retain their Premier Division status for 2020.

2019-20 marks Harps's fiftieth season in the League of Ireland.

In a COVID-19 disrupted 2020 season, Harps again managed to avoid the drop, with a last day of the season win against Waterford F.C. securing their place in the Premier Division again under Horgan, in what was his seventh season in charge of Harps.

The 2021 season got off to a good start with Adam Foley securing a win over Bohemians. May 2021 would see Finn Harps get their first ever away success over Derry City at league level.

The end of the Horgan era for Finn Harps came at the end of the 2022 season, with the departure of manager Ollie Horgan and relegation from the Premier Division. This ended a long spell of years in the Premier Division, with six out of seven seasons spent at the top tier of Irish football for the club.

=== Return to the First Division ===
On 2 December 2022, Finn Harps unveiled Dave Rogers as their new manager, on a full-time four-year contract. Ten days later, Darren Murphy was announced as Rogers new full time assistant manager. After a disastrous 2023 season on the pitch, Finn Harps parted company with Dave Rogers on 23 September, with assistant manager Darren Murphy placed as interim manager until the end of the season, himself assisted by Tommy Canning and Kevin McHugh.

On 3 November 2023, Harps announced the appointment of Darren Murphy to become the Head Coach for the upcoming season. In his first pre-season match, Harps secured a 2–2 draw in front of the home crowd against Derry City.

Under Darren Murphy, the team had a good start to the season, peaking at 2nd place in the early stages but came short to the play-off places to Bray Wanderers in the 2024 season.

A shaky start to Harps 2025 season with an away loss to Kerry FC 2-0 saw Harps placed 10th position at the end of Gameweek 5 in the First Division for the first time since the reign of Dave Rogers. Numerous losses were accounted until a 5-0 win home to Bray Wanderers in Gameweek 6 secured Harps first win of the 2025 season.

On 25 March, the club confirmed the departure of manager Darren Murphy from the club. Following an interim basis with joint management by Kevin McHugh, Eamon Curry and Tommy Canning the club announced on 2 April 2025 that McHugh was confirmed to be the next manager of Finn Harps.

Within the first half of the 2025 season, Harps recorded only five wins, along with eight draws and ten defeats in the league. New introductions were brought into the squad to strengthen the team's performances, with Patrick Ferry and William Oduwa departing the club. Harps confirmed the signing of Kieran Cooney, a Saint Kitts & Nevis international on 4 July. On 3 September, goalkeeper Oisín Cooney transferred to Burnley Under-21 side becoming the latest Finn Harps Academy player to join a Premier League 2 side after having 12 appearances for the first team.

The club secured a quarter-final in the 2025 FAI Cup after recording wins over UCD and Bray Wanderers at home respectively. Harps were knocked out in the Quarter-Final stage, following a 3-0 defeat home to Cork City.

On 26 July 2026, Kevin McHugh resigned as manager of Harps. On 29 July, the club appointed Patrick McEleney as Interim Head Coach. McEleney, alongside his brother Shane McEleney served as the interim coaches for the remainder of Harps' 2026 campaign in which the club finished 10th in the First Division, a record low for the club.

=== The Freddy Gonzalez Era ===
On 26 June 2026, Finn Harps announced a proposed takeover by Filipino entrepreneur and former footballer Freddy Gonzalez, potentially ending the club's supporter-owned operating model. Gonzalez pledged an initial investment of over €4 million towards improvements to Finn Park, staffing, training facilities and the transition to a full-time professional squad.

On 19 October 2026, members of the Finn Harps Co-operative Society voted 396–3 in favour of the acquisition, with one abstention. A second vote on 3 November confirmed the decision, with 322 votes in favour, two against and one abstention.

Under the proposed agreement, Gonzalez would assume control of the club's football operations and existing debts, while the co-operative would retain the new stadium project and proposed Centre of Excellence. The transaction is expected to be finalised in early December 2026, subject to outstanding legal arrangements.

== Stadium ==
Finn Harps play at Finn Park in Ballybofey, County Donegal. Finn Park is formed mainly of open terracing surrounding the football pitch. In 2005, the terraces were renovated for health and safety reasons as new concrete surfaces replaced the old viewing slopes. In total, the ground's capacity accommodates approximately 6,000 spectators. The stadium has one covered stand, which also caters for 350 seated supporters. The area allocated to supporters of visiting teams is the terrace opposite the seated stand (situated in the Shed End). The pitch dimensions measure 110 yards in length by 80 yards in width. Sitting on the banks of the River Finn, Finn Park is prone to waterlogging in times of wet weather.

=== New stadium ===
The club planned to move to a new covered 6,600 all-seater stadium just across the River Finn in Stranorlar. The proposal would also feature an FAI Regional Development Centre. Club shareholders gave the club's board a mandate in 2005 to proceed with the stadium plans. Planning permission was obtained in mid-2005. Approval to proceed to tender was obtained from the Football Association of Ireland in early 2006 and local developers, Joseph McMenamin and Sons, won the tender process and had their tender approved a year later. Finn Harps received funding of €750,000 in 2007 to commence works at the new stadium. They hoped to be in the new stadium for the 2013 season. Work ceased on the new stadium due to the recession and lack of funds. Work was expected to resume on the stadium in early 2011 but in the end it did not restart until late 2014.

Revised plans were unveiled in May 2022, showing a 6,130 capacity ground, with all four sides covered, and a seating capacity of 3,330.

== Colours and crests ==
Old Finn Harps crest	More modern crest	The golden jubilee crest

The traditional colours of Finn Harps are blue and white. The club played in white jerseys and blue shorts upon entry into the League of Ireland. Their away strip was all green. Since that time Harps have played in either white or blue jerseys as their primary colour and used green, yellow or white as their away colours. In the 1975/76 and 1976/77 Harps wore blue and white stripes and repeated this during 1983/84 and 1984/85.

Harps kits and training gear is currently manufactured by Joma Sports, and the club's jerseys are sponsored by The Kernan Group, with Letterkenny Medics sponsoring the back. The current home strip is made up of a blue jersey with black pattern across the shoulders and chest, white shorts and socks with the home goalkeeping kit being a black jersey with black shorts and black socks. The current away strip consists of a white jersey with black pattern, black collared trim, black shorts and black socks, the away goalkeeping kit is made up of a neon green jersey, neon green shorts and neon green socks.

Finn Harps have sported various crests throughout their history. All, largely circular in composition, have featured a harp and new designs have essentially been modernised updates of the previous crest. The harp has traditionally been a symbol of Ireland. Footballs have also been a common feature.

The modern stylised crests contain the club's name in a Gaelic-style font, similar to the Gandalf and Stonehenge typefaces.

For the club's golden jubilee year, 2004, they introduced a new golden crest which was very similar to their early crest. Bar this crest, blue, green and white have been common colours used.

In 2010, Finn Harps decided to play in an all-white kit due to demand from supporters after they wore an all-white kit against Shelbourne to celebrate 40 years in the League of Ireland in 2009. They reverted to blue home kits in 2011.

For the 2021 season, Joma sport has been announced as the jersey partner.

== Supporters ==
Finn Harps supporters share a rivalry with their north-west neighbours, Derry City. The most exciting encounter between the two sides was perhaps the 2003 relegation play-off between the two sides. A Brandywell Stadium packed with both sets of fans witnessed a Finn Harps side managed by Noel King (a former Derry City manager) lose a highly charged affair that finished 2–1 to Derry after an extra-time goal from Derry City favourite, Liam Coyle. A rivalry is maintained between the two clubs, yet both have encountered times of trouble in recent years. One team has often been helped by the other in this regard. Harps' other main derby is with southern neighbours Sligo Rovers. Harps have a good relationship with Shamrock Rovers. The clubs have provided financial assistance to each other in the past and both sets of supporters socialise together when the clubs play one another. The club's anthem "The Finn Harps Song" can often be heard being sung by the club's supporters and its lyrics "they follow them in Donegal, Derry and Tyrone" illustrates that the main core of the Harps support comes from the North West of Ireland.

== Rivalries ==
Finn Harps and Derry City share what is called the Northwest Rivalry. It has been hotly contested since Derry entered the League in 1985. The close proximity of the two Ulster clubs, being only 30 miles apart, has contributed to the rivalry. The strong contrast between the two clubs, Rural/Urban and the gulf in success, has aided the rivalry. Both sets of fans can be frequently heard singing songs about each other. Many players have played for both clubs, such as José Mukendi, but the most notable of whom is Kevin McHugh. Finn Harps also share a rivalry with Sligo Rovers due to the proximity of the clubs. Although this rivalry is viewed as important, the Derry rivalry is seen as more important by Harps fans.

== Players ==
=== Squad ===
As of February 2026

Note: Flags indicate national team as defined under FIFA eligibility rules; some limited exceptions apply. Players may hold more than one non-FIFA nationality.

No.	Pos.	Nation	Player
1	GK	IRL	Corey Sheridan
2	DF	IRL	Josh Cullen
3	DF	SCO	Ronan Ferns
4	DF	IRL	Conor Tourish
5	MF	IRL	Oran Brogan
6	DF	IRL	Joel Bradley-Walsh
7	MF	POR	Bernardo Monteiro
8	MF	ENG	Max Hutchison
10	MF	IRL	Tony McNamee
11	MF	IRL	Gavin McAteer
13	DF	IRL	Troy Preston Holder
14	DF	IRL	Darragh Coyle

No.	Pos.	Nation	Player
17	MF	IRL	Conor McGranaghan
18	MF	NIR	Ciaron Harkin (on loan from Sligo Rovers)
20	MF	BRA	Guillherme Rego Priosti (on loan from Sligo Rovers)
23	MF	NZL	Finn McKenlay
24	MF	IRL	Adam McDaid
25	GK	BRA	Lorenzo Piaia Barbosa
34	DF	IRL	James McAteer
28	FW	IRL	Aaron McLaughlin
31	GK	IRL	Ryan McConnell
41	MF	IRL	Lukas Doherty

== Technical staff ==
Position	Staff
Manager	Patrick McEleney (interim)
Assistant manager	Shane McEleney (interim)
First-team Coach	Shane Porter
Goalkeeper Coach	Ciaran Gallagher
First-team physio	Seamus Bogle
Fitness Coach	Eoin Logue
Kitman	Allan Foxton
Head of Youth Development	Darren Murray

== Honours ==
- FAI Cup
  - Winners: 1973–74
- League of Ireland
  - Runners-up: 1972–73, 1975–76, 1977–78
- League of Ireland First Division
  - Winners: 2004
  - Runners-up: 2015, 2018
- Dublin City Cup
  - Winners: 1971–72
- Irish News Cup
  - Winners: 1998–99
- FAI Junior Cup
  - Winners: 1967–68
- First Division Cup
  - Winners: 2002–03

== European record ==
=== Overview ===
Competition	Matches	W	D	L	GF	GA
UEFA Cup	6	0	0	6	3	33
European Cup Winners' Cup	2	0	1	1	2	4
TOTAL	8	0	1	7	5	37

=== Matches ===
Season	Competition	Round	Opponent	Home	Away	Aggregate
1973–74	UEFA Cup	1R	(Scotland) Aberdeen	1-3	1-4	7-2
1974–75	European Cup Winners' Cup	1R	(Turkey) Bursaspor	0–0	2–4	2–4
1976–77	UEFA Cup	1R	(England) Derby County	1–4	0–12	1–16
1978–79	UEFA Cup	1R	(England) Everton	0–5	0–5	0–10
