= Clonliffe Harriers =

Athletics club in Dublin, Ireland

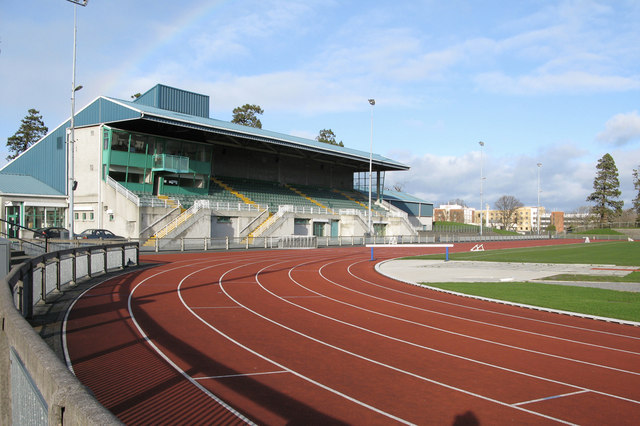
Morton stadium, the home track of Clonliffe Harriers.

Clonliffe Harriers is an athletics club based in Dublin, Ireland. It was founded in 1886, and is one of the oldest athletics clubs in Ireland.

It has been based in Morton Stadium since the 1950s but was originally based in Clonliffe. The Santry grounds originally formed part of Santry Court and were leased by the club from 1956 by Grangegorman Mental Hospital.

The club has coaching and training programs in several disciplines and in all levels. The club competes during the winter in cross country and road events. This involves all ages from under 10 to senior, veterans and all standards.

== Achievements ==
Clonliffe Harriers have won national titles in various national championships in both men's and women's championships.

Championships	Number of wins	Years
National Senior Cross-Country Championships	19	1976, 1977, 1980, 1981, 1982, 1984, 1986, 1987, 1988, 1989, 1991, 1992, 2000, 2004, 2005, 2006, 2007, 2008, 2009
National Road Relay (Senior Men) Championships	1	2006
National Half Marathon (Senior Men) Champions	1	2006
National Marathon (Ladies) Champions	2	2004, 2005
National Ladies Intermediate Cross-Country Champions	1	2005
National Senior Cross Country Championships	7	2003-09
National Junior Cross Country Championships	2	1983, 2009
National Track and Field League (Premier men)	9	2008, 2009, 2015, 2016, 2017, 2018, 2019, 2021, 2022

== Notable members ==
Clonliffe Harriers has been home to nationally and internationally successful athletes, who have competed in both track and field disciplines and cross-country. In 2024, Cathal Doyle became the 23rd Clonliffe Harrier athlete to qualify for the Olympics when he qualified for the 2024 Summer Olympics in Paris in the 1,500m. Below is a list of the 23 Olympians who have competed for the club:

- London 1908 - Joe Deakin, George Mayberry and John Reid
- Stockholm 1912 - Timothy Carroll
- Antwerp 1920 - Herbert Carmichael Irwin and Timothy Carroll (2nd)
- Paris 1924 - Norman McEachern
- Amsterdam 1928 - Norman McEachern (2nd)
- London 1948 - John Joe Barry, Paul Dolan, David Guiney
- Helsinki 1952 - Paul Dolan (2nd)
- Rome 1960 - Michael Hoey, Gerry McIntyre
- Mexico 1968 - Frank Murphy
- Munich 1972 - Frank Murphy (2nd), Claire Walsh, Danny McDaid
- Los Angeles 1984 - Jerry Kiernan
- Seoul 1988 - Anne Keenan-Buckley
- Barcelona 1992 - Bobby O'Leary
- Atlanta 1996 - Niall Bruton
- Athens 2004 - Alistair Cragg
- Beijing 2008 - Alistair Cragg (2nd)
- London 2012 - Alistair Cragg (3rd), Mark Kenneally
- Tokyo 2020 - Marcus Lawler, Stephen Scullion
- Paris 2024 - Cathal Doyle

== See also ==
- List of athletics tracks in Ireland
