= Josh Cullen (footballer, born 2008) =

Irish footballer (born 2008)

Personal information
- Date of birth: 30 March 2008 (age 18)
- Place of birth: Donegal, County Donegal, Ireland
- Height: 1.82 m (6 ft 0 in)
- Position: Defender

Team information
- Current team: Finn Harps
- Number: 2

Youth career
- Donegal Town
- 2021–2024: Finn Harps

Senior career*
Years	Team	Apps	(Gls)
2025–	Finn Harps	52	(0)

International career^{‡}
2025	Republic of Ireland U17	7	(0)
2026–	Republic of Ireland U19	7	(1)
- * Club domestic league appearances and goals as of 16:08, 11 November 2026 (UTC) ‡ National team caps and goals as of 14:42, 15 November 2026 (UTC)

Josh Cullen (born 30 March 2008) is an Irish professional footballer who plays as a defender for League of Ireland First Division club Finn Harps. He also plays at youth international level for the Republic of Ireland.

Cullen played youth football with Donegal Town before joining Finn Harps at U14 level. He signed his first senior contract with the club in 2025.

McAteer is a Republic of Ireland youth international and has represented Ireland at the FIFA U-17 World Cup.

== Club career ==
=== Finn Harps ===
On 11 February 2025, Cullen signed a senior contract with League of Ireland First Division club Finn Harps, alongside teammates Adam McDaid and Corey Sheridan. On 28 February, Cullen made his debut for the club against Treaty United at Markets Field. On 15 August, Cullen scored his first goal for the club in a 3–1 win over Bray Wanderers in the FAI Cup.

Cullen re-signed for the club for the 2026 season.

== International career ==
On 28 May 2025, Cullen was called up to the Republic of Ireland U17s for the first time. Cullen was included in the squad that travelled to the 2025 FIFA U-17 World Cup alongside Finn Harps teammates, Gavin McAteer and Corey Sheridan. Cullen started Ireland's final group game against Paraguay, where he kept a clean sheet.

In March 2026 Cullen was called up to the Republic of Ireland U19s for the first time, and started in their first 2027 U19 Euros qualifier against Poland.

== Career statistics ==
=== Club ===
As of match played 16 October 2026

Appearances and goals by club, season and competition
Club	Season	League			National cup (Note: Includes FAI Cup)		Total	
Club	Season	Division	Apps	Goals	Apps	Goals	Apps	Goals
Finn Harps	2025	LOI First Division	24	0	3	1	27	1
Finn Harps	2026	LOI First Division	28	0	1	0	29	0
Finn Harps	Total		52	0	4	1	56	1
Career total			52	0	4	1	56	1
