= GAA =

Gaa may refer to:

== Compounds ==
- Glacial (water-free), acetic acid
- Acid alpha-glucosidase, also known as glucosidase, alpha; acid, an enzyme
- a codon for glutamic acid

== Government ==
- GADA 601, Argentine Army unit Grupo de Artillería Antiaérea 601 (Anti-Aircraft Artillery Group 601)
- General Allotment Act, US law passed in 1887 regarding Indian land
- Group Areas Acts, South African apartheid laws
- General Appropriation Act, the legislative act used in some countries for a national or state budget

== Organisations ==
- Gaelic Athletic Association, governing body of Gaelic games such as hurling and Gaelic football
- Gay Activists Alliance, New York City gay rights organisation 1969–81
- Gemmological Association of Australia, an educational organisation based in Sydney
- Global Accounting Alliance, an accounting organisation
- Global Aquaculture Alliance, an international non-profit trade association
- Grenada Athletic Association, the governing body for the sport of athletics in Grenada
- Guam Adventist Academy, a private school in Guam

== Other uses ==
- Gaa language, a language of Nigeria
- Ga'a, a military leader in the ancient Oyo Empire in West Africa
- gaa, the ISO 639 code for the Ga language of Ghana
- GAA, the ICAO airline code for Business Express Airlines
- Gaelic football, an Irish team sport commonly known as GAA
- Generic Authentication Architecture, a mobile phone specification
- Goals against average, goalkeeping statistic used by several sports and many leagues
- Ford GAA engine
- Gate-all-around, a specific type of 3D transistors
