= Morton Stadium =

Athletics facility in Dublin, Ireland

Coordinates: 53.401179°N 6.245063°W

- Staid de Mortún
- National Athletics Stadium, Santry Stadium
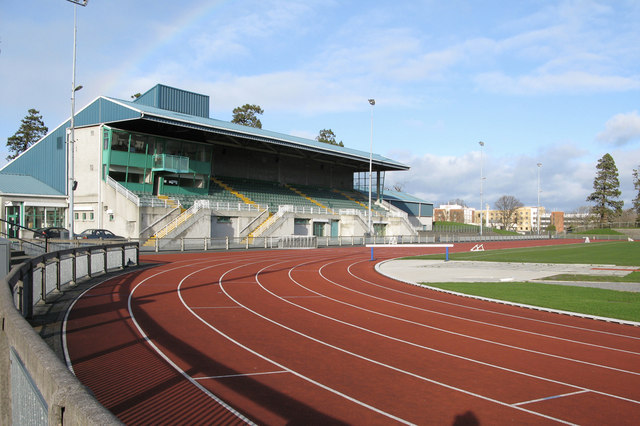

- Location within Dublin
- Location: Santry, Dublin, Ireland
- Capacity: 8,800 (800 seated)
- Public transit: Dublin Airport; Swords Road bus stop (Dublin Bus)

Construction
- Opened: 1958

Tenants
- Current; Clonliffe Harriers; Former; Drumcondra F.C. Raheny United F.C. Shamrock Rovers F.C. Shelbourne Ladies F.C. Dublin City F.C. Sporting Fingal F.C.

Morton Stadium, or the National Athletics Stadium, is an athletics stadium in Santry Demesne, Santry in Ireland. Often called Santry Stadium, it is the centre for athletics events in Dublin city and the home track of Clonliffe Harriers. Managed by Dublin City University, it has also been the home ground for several Irish association football clubs including Shamrock Rovers and Dublin City. The modern capacity of the ground is 8,800, with a single 800-seat covered stand.

== History ==
=== 1958–1970 ===
==== Athletics ====
The stadium was opened in 1958 with a cinder track. An inaugural series of meetings was held, and on 6 August 1958, Australian Herb Elliott shattered the world record for the mile run with a time of 3 minutes 54.5 seconds. This was the first race in which five athletes had run a four-minute mile.

==== Cycling ====
Billy Morton, the businessman and administrator who started the track development for running, decided to arrange a cycling event in 1959, inspired by the progress of Ireland's first continental racing star, and only professional cyclist, Shay Elliott. He persuaded Lord Moyne, then Chairman of Guinness plc to pay for a banked cycle racing track, in tarmac, in celebration of the company's 200th anniversary. He then secured contractors to build it in just six weeks, after Lord Moyne turned the first sod on 1 May. The track was built around the running track, 515 yards long and 25 feet wide. Morton, with help from the CRE, also arranged for a small number of European cycling professionals to come for the headline race, with an "undercard" of Irish amateur riders. His achievements saw him voted as one of Ireland's "ten most popular public figures" by readers of the Irish Independent.

The professional race featured was headlined by Fausto Coppi, as well as Elliott, Brian Robinson, André Darrigade, Albert Bouvet and Roger Hassenforder. At 4 a.m. on 15 June, the stadium was damaged when a bomb exploded across the road; the Republican movement denied responsibility, stating "no member of the movement was involved in this affair" and some blamed the longstanding feud between the internationally-recognised CRE and another cycling group, the NCA. The stadium was repaired and the race meeting proceeded the same day, with Elliott winning the sprint, Darrigarde the points race, and then Elliott and Coppi facing off for the 4000m individual pursuit, which Elliott won at a time of 5:07. Christy Kimmage won among the amateurs.

The cycling track had fallen into disrepair by the late 1960s, and was later removed.

=== 1970–present ===
In 1978 the stadium was resurfaced with a tartan track, making it the second such facility in the Republic of Ireland, after the UCD track at Belfield, which later became defunct. In the early 1990s it was renamed after Billy Morton, the administrator who had initiated the original track and who brought famous athletes to compete in the stadium. It hosted the athletics events of the Special Olympics World Games in 2003.

On 25 July 2008, a special event was held in the stadium, the Morton Memorial Meeting, to commemorate the 50th anniversary of the aforementioned world mile record in an event promoted by Billy Morton. The event website is www.mortonmemorial.com where there are photos of the 1958 event.

The track (both indoor and outdoor) was re-laid in late 2010. The indoor track is now blue.

== Facilities ==
The stadium consists of a small covered stand with 800 seats and three sides of open terracing, bringing the total capacity up to 4,000. The stand encompasses dressing rooms and other facilities; there are also separate clubhouses for the associated clubs.

The stadium complex also has indoor athletics training facilities.

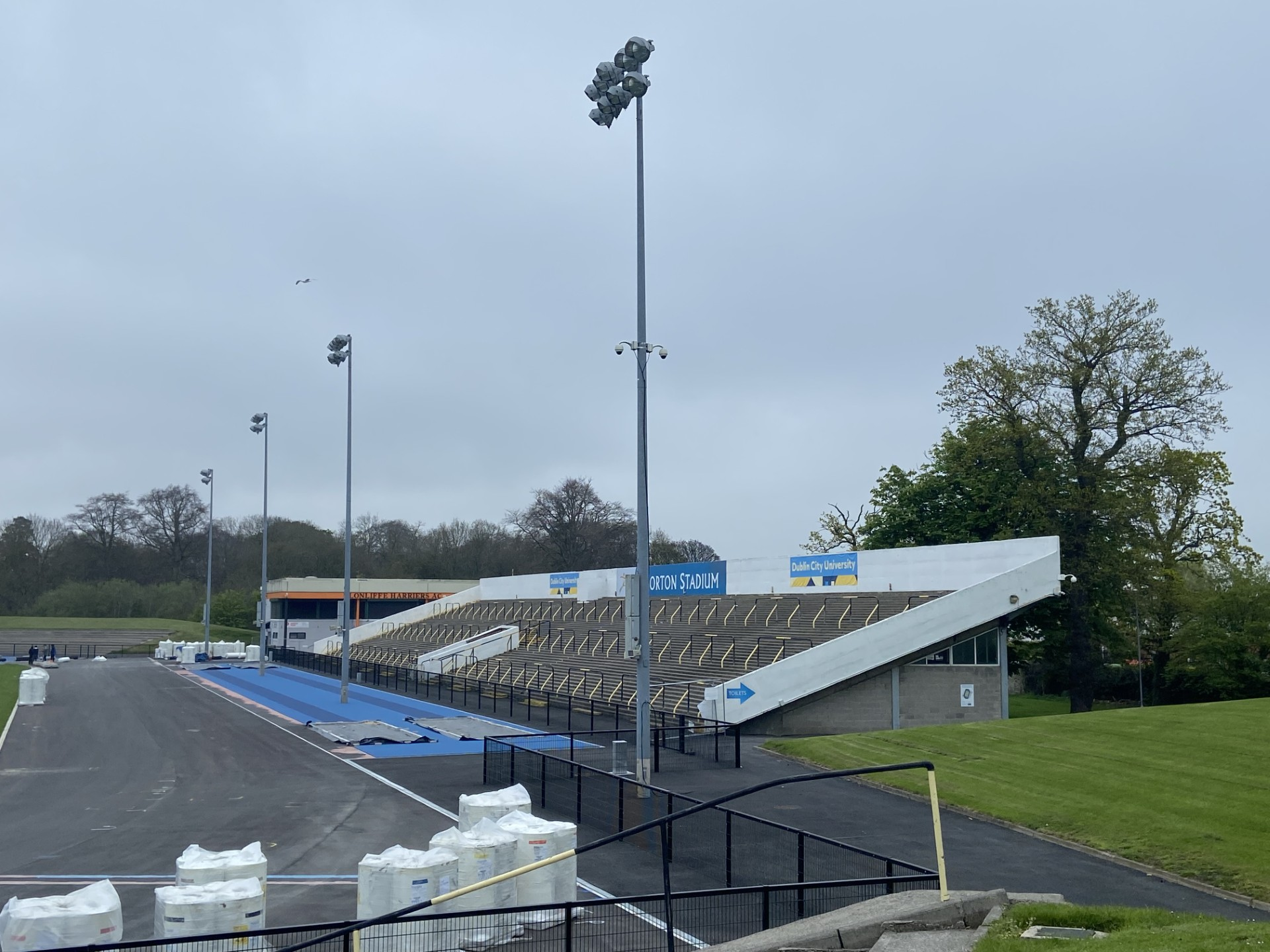
Terracing at Morton Stadium

== Usage ==
Morton Stadium is the centre for athletics events in Dublin city. It is also the home track for the Clonliffe Harriers athletics club.

The stadium hosted Shelbourne Ladies F.C. and Drumcondra F.C., and has also been home ground for Shamrock Rovers (from 1999–2001), Dublin City, Raheny United F.C. and the now-defunct Sporting Fingal F.C.

Rugby League

International Rugby League Matches
| Date | Home | Score | Opponent | Competition | Attendance |
|---|---|---|---|---|---|
| 27 October 2018 | Ireland | 36–10 | Scotland | 2018 European Championship | 200 |
| 3 November 2018 | Ireland | 10–24 | France | 2018 European Championship | 250 |
| 9 November 2019 | Ireland | 25–4 | Italy | 2021 RLWC qualifying | |

== See also ==
- Stadiums of Ireland
- List of athletics tracks in Ireland
