= List of athletics tracks in Ireland =

The below list contains all the athletics tracks in the Republic of Ireland as of August 2024 including those that have been closed or are currently under development.

== List of athletics tracks ==
County	Name and Location	Coordinates	Size	Type	Club	Year opened	Image	Notes
Carlow	St Abbans		400m	Gravel				
Carlow	Carlow IT		150m	Tartan				
Cavan	Shercock		300m	Tartan	Shercock AC			
Clare	Ennis, Lees Road Sports and Amenity Park		400m	Tartan	Ennis Track AC			
Clare	Ennis, Tim Smythe Park		400m	Cinder				
Cork	Cork Institute of Technology, Bishopstown		400m	Tartan	Cork Institute of Technology	1979		Resurfaced 2024.
Cork	Bandon, County Cork		400m	Tartan	Bandon			Site acquired and granted planning in 2024.
Cork	Leevale High-Performance Centre, Farranlea Road							
Cork	Clondrohid		200m (4 lane)	Tartan				200m 4 lane tartan track and sprint straight
Cork	Mardyke		400m	Tartan	UCC			Closed March 2024 due to deterioration in condition.
Donegal	Aura Letterkenny		400m	Tartan	Letterkenny Athletic Club			
Donegal	Lifford		400m	Mondo				
Donegal	Ballybofey		400m	Tartan	Finn Valley			
Donegal	Donegal Town			Mondo	Tir Chonaill AC			
Dublin	Morton Stadium, Santry		400m	Mondo	Clonliffe Harriers	1958		Cinder track (1958), Tartan track (1978), Resurfaced (2023)
Dublin	Irishtown Stadium		400m	Tartan	Crusaders	1950s		Fully renovated in 2004.
Dublin	University College Dublin		400m	Mondo	UCD	2023		IAAF standard mondo track.
Dublin	University College Dublin (Belfield)		400m	Tartan	UCD			Closed in 2011.
Dublin	Kilbarrack		400m	Cinder				
Dublin	Kilbogget Park, Cabinteely		400m	Tartan		2024		
Dublin	Tibradden Rd, Kilmashogue, Dublin 16		400m	Mondo	Dundrum South Dublin			
Dublin	ALSAA, Dublin Airport		400m	Tartan	ALSAA			
Dublin	National Indoor Arena (Ireland)		200m (indoor)	Tartan				
Dublin	Lucan Harriers		400m	Tartan	Lucan Harriers			
Dublin	Éamonn Ceannt Park, Crumlin		400m	Cinder				
Dublin	Chapelizod		300m	Tartan	Donore Harriers			
Dublin	Tallaght		400m	Tartan	Tallaght Athletics Club			
Dublin	Porterstown, Dublin 15		400m (6 lane)	Tartan	Metro St. Brigid's (MSB)	2023		
Galway	Athenry		400m	Tartan	Athenry Athletics Club	2023		Opened in May 2023
Galway	Ballinasloe		400m	Tartan				
Galway	Galway, Dangan		400m	Tartan	Galway City Harriers [GCH]			synthetic track
Galway	Galway, Westside		400m (6 lane)	Tartan				
Kerry	Castleisland		400m	Tartan				
Kerry	Tralee		110m (4 lane)	Tartan	Tralee Harriers			Shot Put throwing circle, hammer and discus circle and long and triple jump pits
Kildare	Clane		200m	Astro				
Kildare	Kilcock		400m	Cinder				
Kildare	Newbridge, County Kildare		400m	Cinder				
Kildare	Leixlip		400m	Tartan				
Kildare	Celbridge		400m	Grass				
Kilkenny	Greenville, Kilmacow		400m	Grass	St Senan's			
Kilkenny	Scanlon Park		400m	Tartan				
Limerick	University of Limerick		400m	Tartan				225m jogging track indoor
Louth	Bush Post Primary School, Dundalk		400m (6 lane)	Tartan	Glenmore Athletic Club	2008		
Louth	Drogheda, Lourdes Stadium		400m	Tartan				
Mayo	Ballina, County Mayo		400m	Tartan	Ballina AC			
Mayo	Claremorris		400m	Tartan				
Meath	Athboy		400m	Grass	Fr Murphy AC			
Meath	Bohermeen		400m	Tartan				
Meath	Cushinstown		400m	Grass				
Meath	Dunboyne		400m	Tartan				
Meath	Gormanstown		400m	Cinder				
Meath	Ratoath		400m	Grass				
Meath	Navan, Claremont Stadium		400m	Tartan				
Meath	Skyne		400m	Cinder				
Monaghan	Clones, County Monaghan		400m	Tartan				
Monaghan	Carrickmacross		400m	Cinder	Carrick Aces			
Monaghan	Beech Hill College, Tirkeenan, Monaghan		400m	Cinder				
Offaly	Tullamore		400m	Tartan	Tullamore Harriers			
Sligo	Sligo IT		400m	Tartan				
Tipperary	Moyne, County Tipperary		400m (4 lane)	Tartan				
Tipperary	Nenagh Arena		200m (indoor)	Tartan				Hosted the Irish Indoor Athletics Championships on 16 occasions.
Tipperary	Templemore		400m	Tartan				
Waterford	Waterford Regional Sports Centre		400m	Mondo				
Westmeath	AIT, Athlone		400m	Tartan				
Westmeath	AIT International Arena		200m (indoor)	Tartan				Hosted the Irish Indoor Athletics Championships on 4 occasions.
Wexford	Rosslare Strand		200m	Tartan				100m strip and 200m tartan
Wexford	Enniscorthy		400m	Tartan				
Wicklow	Greystones		400m	Tartan				
Wicklow	Arklow			Cinder				
Wicklow	Charlesland Athletics Track		400m	Tartan				Resurfaced 2024.

== See also ==
- Athletics Ireland
