= Donegal Community Stadium =

Football stadium development in Ireland

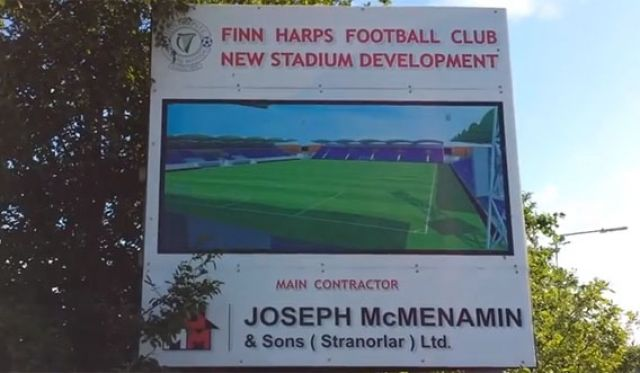
- Signage, with an artist's impression, from 2014
- Interactive map of Donegal Community Stadium
- Location: Railway Road, Stranorlar, Republic of Ireland
- Coordinates: 54°48′03″N 7°46′07″W
- Surface: Grass

Construction
- Groundbreaking: 2008

Tenant
- Finn Harps FC (planned)

The Donegal Community Stadium is a stalled construction project in Stranorlar, Ireland. The stadium was initially intended to have a capacity of 6,600 spectators, and proposed as an association football venue to replace Finn Park as the home stadium of Finn Harps F.C.

While planning permission was granted in March 2005 and the project broke-ground in May 2008, the project stalled during the post-2008 Irish economic downturn. Legal and tax issues delayed further construction work until 2011. By August 2011, work on the site had restarted, and foundations were in place by late 2011. The project was again delayed in October 2012, with "minimal work" undertaken between 2014 and 2024, pending additional funding. In April 2021, a "provisional allocation" of government funding was reportedly announced.

By May 2022, the development plans were scaled-back to account for inflation and the increased cost of building works and materials. While this revised proposal was reportedly given the "green light" in August 2022, a "revised 5,500-capacity stadium" was still pending funding as of February 2024. An updated planning submission, with yet further changes, was lodged in late 2024. This was reportedly approved in December 2025.

== History ==
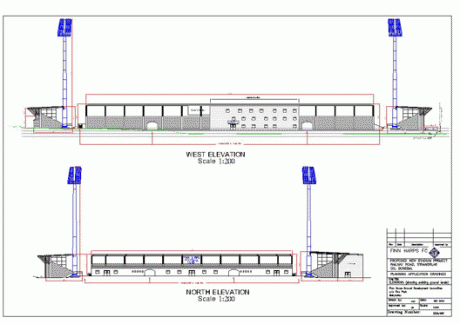
Drawings of main stand from original plans

=== Initial proposal (2005) ===
Talks over a new stadium for Finn Harps began in late 2004. Initial drawings had the stadium planned as a 7,000 seater stadium, but these were subsequently revised to a planned 6,600 all-seater stadium. Stadium plans were confirmed and backed by the club's shareholders on 31 January 2005. Planning permission was granted in March 2005, a public tender process completed in 2006 but government funding approval was not granted until April 2007. While ground was eventually broken on 12 May 2008, delays to the transfer of land, lease arrangements and drawdown of funding meant that an extension to planning permission was sought in February 2010. A two-year extension was approved but legal and tax issues delayed initial construction work until 2011.

Although expected by Finn Harps to take place in January 2011, the first drawdown of grant money took place in May 2011 with the club confirming in August that construction work had resumed. By August 2012 only the foundations of the main stand had been completed and a further extension to planning permission was sought. Reasons given for the delay included further land transfer issues and government funding availability due to the economic situation. It was reported that the delay was also due to financial reasons, as a decline in property values meant that the new stadium was more dependent on state funding. In October 2012, a five-year extension was granted, although it wasn't until 2014 that significant building work was undertaken on site. By late 2014, on-site work had stalled indefinitely.

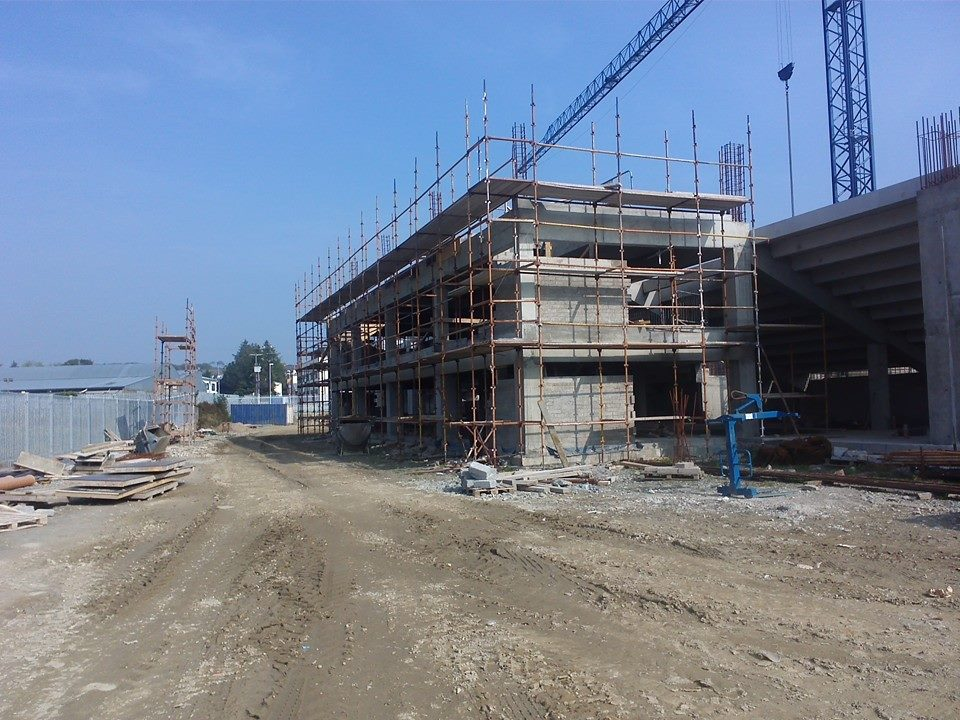
Rear of main stand with admin block as constructed before work stalled

=== Relaunch of project (2017) ===
At their AGM in May 2017, Finn Harps announced that revised plans would be launched later that summer. On 24 May, the club applied for and received another five-year extension to the stadium's planning permission. Changes in the updated proposal included a reduction in seating capacity, consisting of a main stand with 1,954 seats and another stand opposite with 1,700 seats. Two terraced ends with standing capacities of 900 each also meant a reduced stadium capacity totalling 5,400. The club later said that the Department of Sport had proposed a new model in 2017 to deliver the project, and the club had agreed.

At the start of July 2018, the Department of Sport announced a €304,000 grant towards the relaunch — including surveying the site, completing work-in-progress tasks and finalising detailed design — with the aim of restarting the stadium build in Stranorlar. In February 2019, work on the stadium was reportedly due to resume later in the year but, in January 2020, Harps stated their "surprise and disappointment" at the exclusion of the Donegal Community Stadium project from grants announced by the Department of Sport. In the same month, it was also reported that the state had previously expressed a willingness to fully fund the cost of the stadium, estimated at €6.7 million. By May 2020, it was instead reported that virtually no work had been carried out in the last four years. Despite the lack of progress and the impact of the Covid-19 pandemic, the Department of Sport remained in discussions with Harps regarding the first phase of the project; the completion of the main stand, a new pitch and the installation of floodlights at a cost of €7 million.

While the situation had not changed by September 2020, the Department of Sport announced a "provisional allocation" in April 2021 of €3.99m for the stadium development, with payment of the grant conditional on other sources covering the balance of the construction costs.

=== Revised plans (2022) ===
In May 2022, owing to the rapid increase in the cost of supplies and demand on the construction industry, Finn Harps released further revised plans for a 6,130 capacity ground on the site. These revised plans included a West Stand of 1,930 seats in (as of May 2022) a partially built structure. Together with a proposed East Stand of 1,400 seats, the total seating capacity of this plan would be 3,330 along both touchlines. The plan proposed the development of terracing at the two ends of the ground, each with a capacity of 1,400. The May 2022 plan proposed that all four sides of the ground would be covered and that a new pitch would be laid. These revised 2022 plans were protected to cost in the region of €8 million. During August 2022, the Minister of State for Sport and the Gaeltacht reportedly gave the "green light" to this updated proposal.

As of early 2024, the development of a "[further] revised 5500-capacity stadium" was costed at €7.3 million, with funding from FAI grants, government grants, Donegal County Council and the Western Development Council being matched and supplemented with up to €1.2 million from the club. As of February 2024, "minimal on-site work" had occurred since 2014.

=== Further plans (2024) ===
In December 2024, Finn Harps and Carr Architects lodged a new planning submission for the stadium project. This updated proposal covered a potential capacity of 5,580. The revised submission still proposes that four stands would surround the field, with terracing at both ends of the ground. An announcement on the Finn Harps website compared the proposed design with Salford City's ground at Moor Lane. At Finn Harps' AGM in July 2025, the club indicated that planning permission could be granted before December 2025. Finn Harps confirmed that Donegal County Council had granted planning permission in December 2025. In May 2026, the Minister of State for Sport stated that work on the project was ongoing.
