= Coolock parish (Church of Ireland) =

Parish of the Church of Ireland in Dublin

Coolock is an ecclesiastical parish of the Church of Ireland located in Dublin, Ireland. It is one of two successors to the ancient parish of that name, the other being the ongoing Roman Catholic parish of St Brendan.

== History ==
=== Early years ===
The parish came into being sometime from 1536 on but the first clerical records related to it are later. One, the calendar of Bishops of Waterford, notes that Marmaduke Middleton, Vicar of Coolock (and Dunboyne, as well as Rector of Killure), was consecrated as Bishop in 1579 (he resigned from that office in 1581). The second, from 1615, refers to one John Credlan as "Rector of Coolock and Curate at Rathenny" (Raheny). It is believed that the predecessor of the older St. Assam's Church in Raheny was built in the same period, c. 1609.

By 1641, the Vicar of Coolock (and again, also Curate at Raheny) was Thomas Seele, who was also during his career Dean of St. Patrick's Cathedral, Precentor of Christ Church Cathedral and Provost of Trinity College Dublin. Rev. John Jackson (1705 - 1787) of Woodlands House, Clonshaugh, was Vicar of Coolock from 1745-1760.

=== New church ===
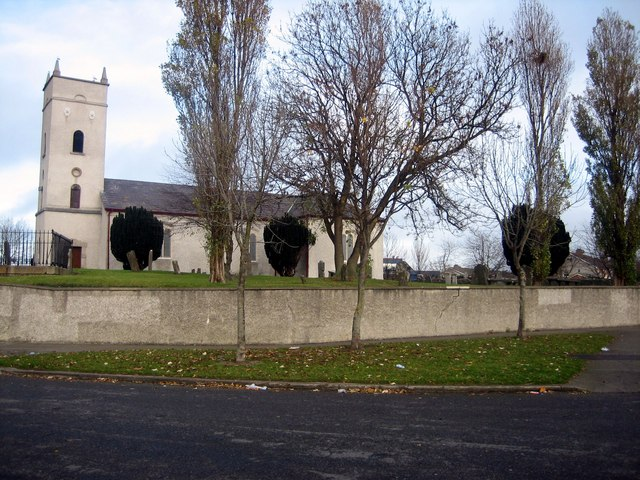
Church of St. John the Evangelist, Coolock

In 1760, a Parish Church, the Church of St. John the Evangelist (locally just "St. John's") was built on the site of the ruined Church of St. Brendan, on the banks of the Santry River at Tonlegee Road, opposite the Holy Well of St. Brendan, and later, a parochial hall was added. In 1820, the rector was Henry Moore, and from no later than 1837 to the 1860s, the office was held by William Maconchy, who is recorded as marrying Anna King at the parish church in 1823.

In Samuel Lewis's Topographical Dictionary of Ireland, the summation for 1837 is:

The living is a vicarage, in the diocese of Dublin, and in the patronage of the Marquess of Drogheda, in whom the rectory is impropriate: the vicarial tithes amount to £249. 4. 7½. There is a glebe-house, with a glebe comprising 17a. 2r. 25p. The church, dedicated to St. Brandon, a neat edifice, was partly rebuilt and enlarged, by aid of a loan of £500 from the late Board of First Fruits, in 1818. ... The parochial school, for which a house was built at an expense of £300, the gift of Sir Compton Domville, Bart., is supported by subscription, and, attended by 30 or 40 children. A school of 30 children, for which a handsome cottage has been built in the grounds of Beaumont, and an infants' school in connection with it, are wholly supported by Mrs. Guinness ...

The Lewis article includes the interesting points re. the right of presentation for the parish, the substantial glebe and tithe, and raises a question about the name of the church (which is also listed as St. Brendan's in Porter's Directory of 1912).

=== Towards union ===
The parishes of Raheny and Coolock shared in outings, Sunday School activities, the parish magazine and the World War I memorial in the years prior to 1920, and the Union of the parishes was first proposed in 1920. In the event, in 1924 Coolock was instead placed in Union with the Parishes of St. Mobhi's, Glasnevin and St. Pappan's, Santry, until 1960.

The Holy Well was covered over in the 1950s.

Coolock was eventually placed in Union with Raheny in 1960. The Rector of Raheny and its church All Saints' Church was appointed in charge of both in March 1960, and the union was completed when he became Rector of Coolock in July of that year. From then on, there was to be a rector in Raheny, a curate in Coolock (the first was appointed in 1963), two churches, and a shared school (now Springdale National School, Raheny). For over twenty years, the "Select Vestries" of the parishes were also united, but this ended in 1981.

The united parish also holds the Church of Ireland chaplaincies of Beaumont Hospital, St. Joseph's Hospital and St. Francis Hospice.

== Rectors/vicars/priests ==
- Rev. Marmaduke Middleton (1579-) also Bishop, Waterford and Lismore.
- Rev. Edward Wetherby.
- Rev. Edward Moore (1595-)
- Rev. John Credlan (1615- )with Raheny
- Rev. Thomas Seele (1639-1648) with Raheny, later Provost of Trinity College Dublin
- Rev. Dr. John Jackson, A.M. (1725-1742) with Santry
- Rev. John Jackson, A.M. (1742-1760) with Cloghran, son of the previous vicar.
- Rev. Smyth Loftus A.M. (1760-1779)
- Rev. Dr. Baird. (1779-1782)
- Rev. Peter Carleton, D.D. (1782-) and Dean of Killaloe
- Rev. Henry Moore, A.B. (1813-)
- Hon. Rev. Richard Ponsonby, A.M. (1823-1828) and Dean of St. Patrick's
- Rev. William Maconchy, A.M. (1828-
- Rev. Henry William Gayer, A.M.(1879-1883)
- Rev. Dr. J. S. Shields, D.D. (1883-1887)
- Rev. John C. Irwin (1887- )
- Rev. Jonathan Sisson Cooper, Dean of Ferns

United Parish of Coolock and Raheny

- Rev. Wilbert Kelly (1970-1975)
- Rev. Canon Cecil Wilson (1975-)
- Rev. James Carroll (1992-2013)
- Rev. Norman McCausland (2013-2022)
- Rev. Kevin Ronné (2023-)
