= Santry Court =

- Seantrabh
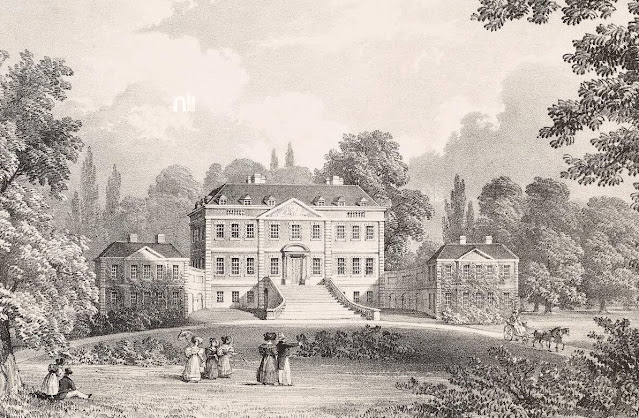
- 1830s engraving of Santry Court by Louis Haghe
- Alternative names: Santry demesne or Santry House

General information
- Status: Private dwelling house
- Type: House
- Architectural style: Georgian, Palladian, Queen Anne
- Classification: Demolished
- Location: Santry, County Dublin, Ireland
- Coordinates: 53.400632°N 6.249636°W
- Elevation: 50 m (160 ft)
- Estimated completion: 1703-09
- Renovated: 1740-50 (quadrant links and wings)
- Closed: 1941 (gutted by fire)
- Demolished: 1959 onwards

Technical details
- Material: Red brick with stone facings
- Floor count: 3 over raised basement

Design and construction
- Developer: Henry Barry, 3rd Baron Barry of Santry

Santry Court was a Georgian house and demesne in Santry, north County Dublin built between 1703 and 1709 on the site of an earlier medieval residence.

== History ==
The Santry estate appears to have been acquired by Richard Barry, a Dublin merchant and alderman sometime in the early 1600s. The Barry's were originally an ancient Cork family although both his father and grandfather were wealthy Dublin merchants. A substantial house was already on the grounds by 1664 when it was taxed for eleven hearths. It would have originally been the Norman manorial settlement of Adam de Feypo.

The house was built between 1703 and 1709 by Henry Barry, 3rd Baron Barry of Santry, and his wife, Bridget Domvile, daughter of Sir Thomas Domvile, 1st Baronet, of Templeogue and granddaughter of William Domville.

The house and estate were later inherited by their son Henry Barry, 4th Baron Barry of Santry, and quadrant links and wings were added later to give the house a more contemporary Palladian appearance around 1734–60. Henry was sentenced to death for murdering one of his servants, but ultimately the sentence was commuted to forfeiting his lands and banishment to England.

The house was later inherited by his uncle Sir Compton Domvile, 2nd Baronet, in 1751. Sir Compton made various unsuccessful attempts to revive the Barry baronetcy.

He later in turn passed it to his nephew Charles Pocklington Domvile (1740–1810) on his death in 1768.

The later Sir Compton Domvile, 1st Baronet, had been made a Baronet (of Templeogue and Santry House) in the Baronetage of the United Kingdom on 27 December 1814.

Lady Helena Compton Domvile was involved in developing a model village in Santry around 1840 in a Swiss style for estate labourers. 14 houses were constructed and referred to as the Swiss cottages owing to their steep gabled rooves and white plastered exteriors.

Ninian Niven is recorded as laying out the formal gardens at the house in 1857 for Compton Domvile and works likely carried on after his death.

Works are also recorded as being carried out at the house by William Connolly & sons in 1862 for Sir Charles Compton William Domvile, 2nd Baronet (1822 – 10 July 1884), and his wife, Lady Margaret Domville, likely to a design by the architect Sandham Symes.

Charles went bankrupt in June 1874 and most of the high-quality interior items were sold off at an auction at the house or sold privately beyond the reach of his creditors.

The couple had no children and were the last of Domvile and Barry families to live on the Santry estate with Lady Margaret dying in 1929.

=== 20th century ===
Details and photos of the house featured in the Georgian Society Records around 1914 indicating that at that time it was still widely admired.

The house remained in the ownership of the wider Domvile family until the death in 1935 of Sir Compton Meade Domvile, 4th Baronet, when the estate passed to his nephew Sir Hugo Poë, who assumed the surname Domvile.

In 1937, the house and grounds came under the stewardship of the state who later acquired it outright and intended to refurbish and extend the house for use as an asylum.

These plans were later abandoned during World War II and the house was used as an army depot owing to its proximity to Dublin airport.

The house was extensively damaged by a fire on October 21, 1941, while the house was occupied by the Irish Defence Forces. The remaining farm buildings had their lead flashing removed in 1956, and the buildings rapidly deteriorated from there with the remains finally demolished in 1959.

Between 1957 and 1958, Morton Stadium was constructed within the grounds of the estate as Ireland's national athletics stadium. The area had earlier been leased to Clonliffe Harriers athletics club in 1956.

In 1969, the estate was sold by the state to several different parties including the family of businessperson Robert (Pino) Harris. It is said many of the archaeological artefacts were destroyed at this time including the statue of the horse on the lawn.

In 1972, 10 acres of the original estate was sold to Trinity College Dublin by the Harris family for use as its sports grounds, while 2 acres were sold to the Industrial Development Agency.

=== 21st century ===
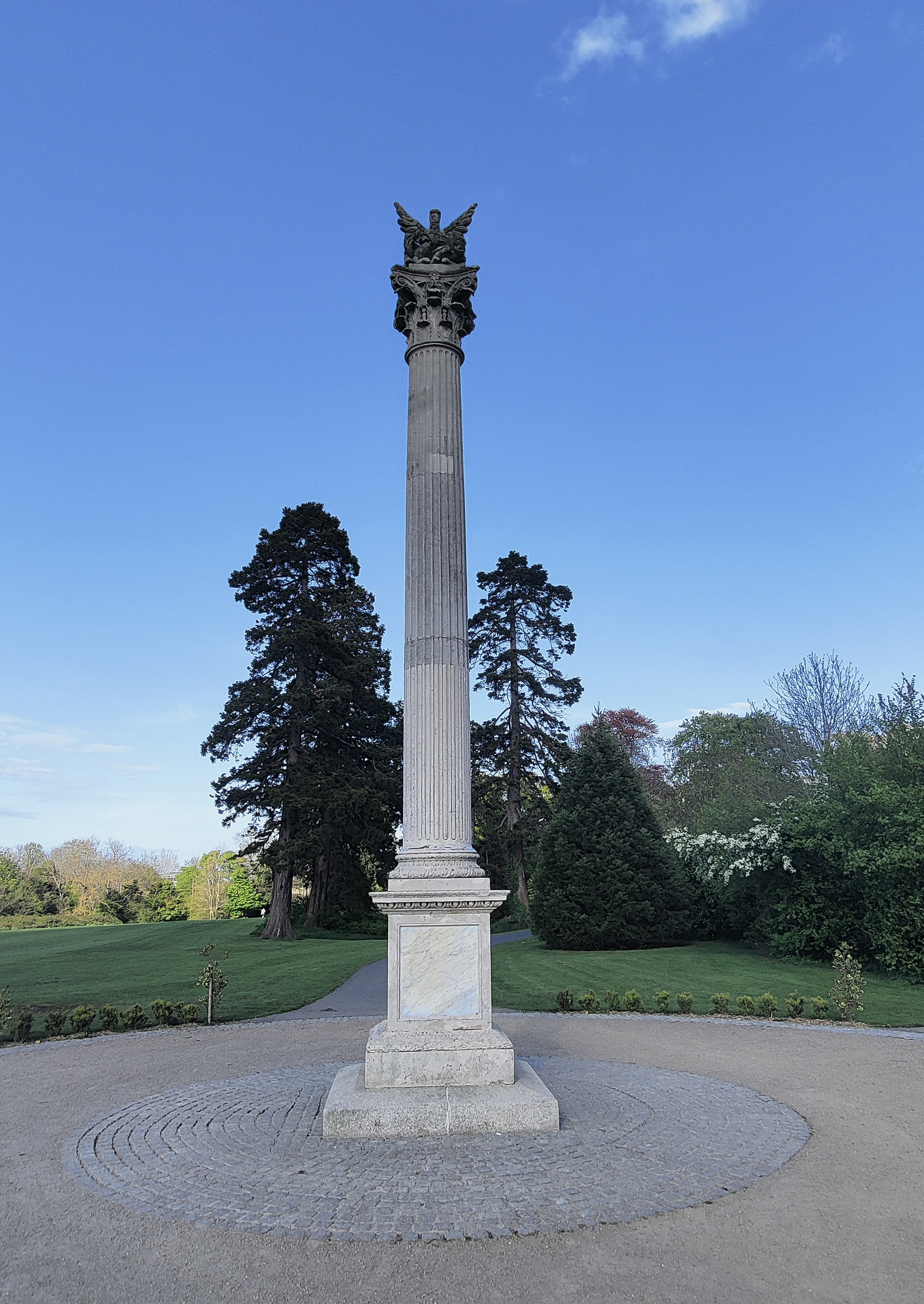
The Phoenix folly at Santry demesne

In 2003 much of the grounds of the original house and estate were opened as a public park. Many of the follies and formal gardens on the estate still exist, including the stone temple which was transported from the Domvile's other residence at Templeogue in 1858 and is now in situ at Luggala in County Wicklow. A facsimile temple is now in its place.

The original phoenix folly also now forms a feature within the public park and is similar to the one contained in the Phoenix Park.

== House and gardens ==
=== House ===
The house was originally constructed in red brick with stone facings and was 9-bays wide with a pedimented breakfront containing 3 bays. It was 2 storeys over a raised basement with a 3rd storey contained in a dormered attic behind the parapet and stone balustrade which was likely added at a later date The dormered windows contain alternating segmental and triangular pediments. The windows and doors were tall and narrow in a style similar to great English country houses of the period. The main front doorcase was also constructed with a segmental stone pediment and ornately carved Corinthian columns at the top of a long and shallow flight of grand stone steps.

About 40 years after its initial construction the house was enlarged with flanking wings in the Palladian style constructed in the same manner as the main house. Both quadrant links to the wings contained pilasters and blind niches. The wings were each respectively 2 storey and 5 bay structures with a matching 3 bay protruding breakfront. The ends of all rooves within the structure contain stone urns.

The interior of the main house contained many notable early 18th century features including finely carved barley twist balusters and corner fireplaces while other features were added during the later 18th and 19th century.

The servants dormer attic rooms were internal with a corridor running around the circumference preventing the inner rooms being observed by visitors as they approached the house.

The house also contained an organ gallery, constructed out of the old stable, while the male servants quarters were located opposite both to the rear of the house.

The gardens also contained a campanile which carried an inscription which read "This house was restored to its original condition by Sir Charles C. W. Domvile Bart. The work commencing in the spring of 1857 and being completed in the spring of 1858."

=== Contents and furniture ===
The house contained many important items of art and furniture including paintings by Dutch masters. Samuel Lewis, writing in 1837 notes the house was "ornamented with numerous family portraits, a valuable collection of historical and scriptural paintings by the best masters, and many valuable specimens of the fine arts".

Most of the furniture and most valuable contents and paintings of the house were intentionally not recorded and secretly removed by Charles Domville and his servant Robert Roberts in the months and years prior to his bankruptcy in 1874 and moved to London or sold to London-based brokers for onward sale in the London, Paris and New York markets. Following this point a sale of the remaining contents of the house was held at the property over a period of ten days.

Among the items sold was a portrait of Richard Wingfield, 1st Viscount Powerscourt (third creation), by painter Anthony Lee which was purchased by the 7th Viscount Powerscourt.

Another notable item was a portrait of members of the Hellfire club made while on the estate with the house in the background. This was purchased by a Mr John Wardell of Thomas Street, Dublin, and was later donated by his son to the National Gallery of Ireland in 1878.

Writing in 1883, Benjamin Adams in 'A History of the Parish of Santry' notes it as "resembling on a minor scale Versailles Palace. It comprises a centre and two wings, the latter thrown forward and connected with the main body by covered passages. The square of the front of the house is enclosed with iron gates, and in its midst is a pillar recording the pedigree and death of an Arab steed belonging to the present owner". The entrance hall at that time also had its ceiling covered with the coats of arms of 78 of families related or connected with the Domville owners.

Among the important items noted in the house by Liam S Gógan were an early genealogical tree, the early parts of which were in the Irish language, these and other valuable contents were destroyed in a fire prior to his recording in 1941. He also noted that the archives of the estate were collected by Dublin Corporation prior to the fire.

=== Gates ===
Other contents and garden items were purchased by various businesspeople and enthusiasts, the garden gates with gas lamps were at one stage proposed to be put at the bottom of North Great George's Street by David Norris after they had been donated to the Irish Georgian Society by the owner of the estate Robert (Pino) Harris.

The main gates to the gardens were moved to the front gate of St. Brendan's Hospital, Dublin around 1940 where they remain as of 2024.

The main gates of the demesne are now located at nearby Dardisdown Cemetery.

=== Gardens ===
A small bend in the Santry River, which forms the boundary of the park today, was widened to create a small pond for the boating pleasure of Georgian ladies and gentlemen who resided at, and visited, the house.

In 1912 King Victor Emmanuel of Italy presented the Domvilles with a gift of 16 foreign tree species.

In 1972, part of the demesne was sold to Trinity College Dublin, and was developed with sports grounds, as well as a book storage facility for its library system.

The stables of the house were only finally demolished in the 1980s while as of 2024 the walled garden still remains.

== See also ==
- St. Pappan's Church
