= Poë (surname) =

Poë is a surname. Notable people with the surname include:

- Edmund Poë (1849–1921), Irish-born British naval officer
- Hutcheson Poë (1848–1934), Irish soldier and politician
- Poë-Domvile baronets (2 generations, 1912–1959), an Irish baronetcy

== See also ==
- Poe (surname)
