= James Domville (disambiguation) =

James Domville was a Canadian politician.

James Domville is also the name of:

- James de Beaujeu Domville (1933–2015), French-born Canadian theatrical producer and administrator
- Sir James Graham Domville, 3rd Baronet (1812–1887), of the Domville baronets
- Sir James Henry Domville, 5th Baronet (1889–1919), of the Domville baronets

== See also ==
- Domville (disambiguation)
