= St. Pappan's Church =

Church in Santry, Dublin, Ireland

Coordinates: 53.3971232°N 6.2436802°W

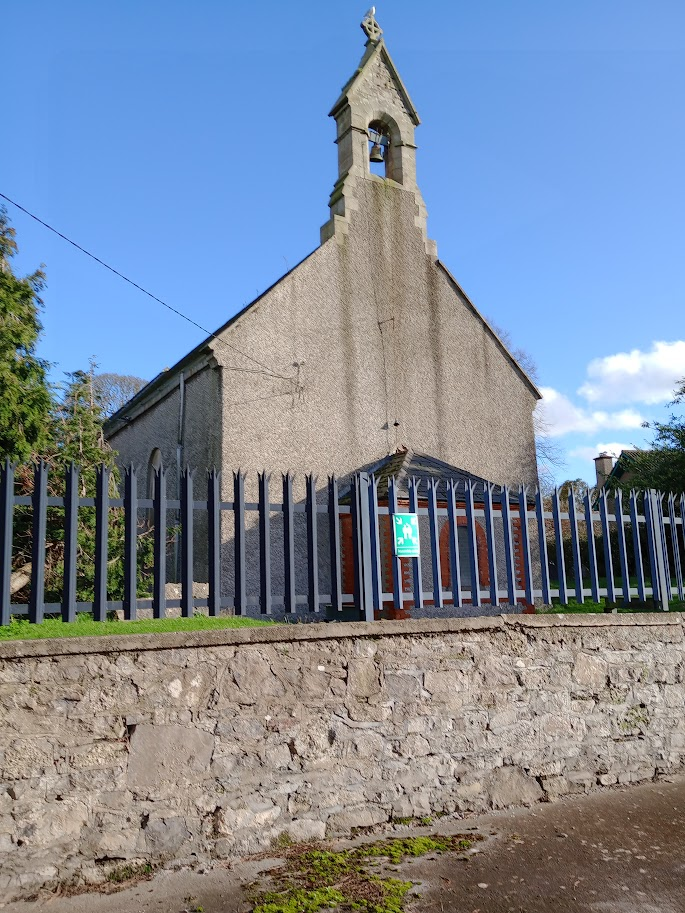
St. Pappan's Church in Santry during golden hour

St. Pappan's Church, is a Church of Ireland church in Santry, a suburb of Dublin. Today it belongs to the Santry (St. Pappan's), Glasnevin (St. Mobhi's) and Finglas (St. Canice's) Grouping of Parishes. There is an old graveyard beside St. Pappan's and a parish hall.

== History ==
The present building was initially built in 1709, and had alterations and restoration work done over the years, including work done by James Franklin Fuller in 1877 and 1889.

The St. Pappan's Parish Hall was used by the Catholic community for weekly mass, while Blessed Margaret's (a chapel of ease for Whitehall church) was being developed. There was a St. Pappan's (St. Pappin's) Catholic Church in Ballymun, built on the Domville Santry Estate, which shared seats with St. Pappan's Church of Ireland, and they moved the seats between the churches between services. Hon. Rev. Denis Brown served as vicar of Santry. In 1872 the synod united Santry with Cloghran, and the first rector was Rev. Dr. Benjamin W. Adams who had been in Cloghran from 1854, appointed the first rector of both churches after the disestablishment of the Church of Ireland, serving from 1876-87. The parish was united with Glasnevin in 1887, and with St. John the Evangelist, Coolock from 1924 until 1960. In 1995 Finglas, joined Santry and Glasnevin, to form the present United parish. The late Dean of Christ Church Rev. Des Harman served as rector of Santry and Glasnevin from 1973 until 1986.

== Features ==
The church contains tombs for the Barry and Domville Families. There is a freestanding mausoleum to former vicar Rev. Henry LeFroy (1789-1876), who died in the Glebe House, Santry. St. Pappan's also has the only monumental brass in Ireland, dedicated to the Rev. Henry Brereton, who is buried in the family vault under the chancel in the church's northern wall.

There is a stained glass window dedicated to parishioners who died in the Great War.

== Associated locations ==
St. Pappin's Well, is located just outside to the North of Church of Ireland grounds, in a garden of a house on Santry Villas. A font from the well, dating from the 14th century, inside St. Pappan's church.

The Schoolhouse (from which Schoolhouse Lane gets its name) was built in 1756 by Rev. John Jackson (1712 - 1787) Vicar of Coolock, funded in accordance with the will of his grandfather, Rev. Daniel Jackson, of Clonshaugh, who was formerly vicar in St. Pappan's (having succeeded his father-in-law Rev. Henry Brearton). Daniel Jackson bequeathed lands, called Golden's Freehold, which he held on lease for 999 years from Lord Barry, to trustees for the benefit of the parish. Sometimes referred to as Burnside School or Rev. John Jacksons School. Daniel's son Rev. John Jackson (died 1751), and father of Rev. John of Coolock, was also vicar of Santry, a contemporary of Dean Swift, and mentioned in his will, built Woodlands House, Clonshaugh. The school closed in 1928, and was used as a house called Burnside House. The building was demolished in 1988, and houses were developed on the land. Rev. Daniel and John Jackson are buried in St. Pappan's.

The Dublin Christian Life Church, after previously renting the church, now occupies the former Rectory of St. Pappan's, a Sino-Irish congregation, the DCLC applied for planning permission in 2017 to build a 200-seater church on the property, and accessed from Schoolhouse Lane.

== Vicars/Rectors of Santry ==
- Rev. William Savage (1591- ) with Clontarf and Drumcondra
- Rev. Richard Wiboiow (1617-) alias Wyborowe, appointed by James I.
- Rev. Randal Dymock (1630-1634)
- Rev. Henry Brereton (1635-1678)
- Rev. Daniel Jackson (1678-1706)
- Rev. Dr. John Jackson (1707-1750) with Coolock from 1725 to 1742. Lived at Woodlands House.
- Rev. M. Cornyn-Middleton LLD (!750-1774)
- Rev. Dr. John Bowden (1774-1776) also served in Meath
- Rev. Hon. James Hewitt (1776-1777), 2nd Viscount Lifford
- Rev. Thomas Hastings LLD (1777-1781) with Kilskeery, Clogher
- Rev. Dr. Thomas Smyth. D.D (1781-1820) with Enniskillen, Clogher
- Rev. Denis Browne (1820-1843)
- Rev. John Frith (1843)
- Rev. Henry LeFroy (1843-1876)

Cloghran and Santry (1876-1887)

- Rev. Dr. Benjamin W. Adams (1876-1886), Rector of Cloghran (1854-1876)
- Rev. J. W. Tristram, (1886-1887), served as curate (1880-1886),

Glasnevin and Santry (1887-1924)

- Rev. J. W. Tristram, (1887-1890)
- Rev. Henry Watters Carson (1890-1895)
- Rev. Richard Archdale Byrn (1895-1924)

Coolock, Glasnevin and Santry (1924-1960)

- Rev. Richard Archdale Byrn (1924-193?)
- Rev. W. R. A. Bond (1940-1960)

Glasnevin and Santry (1960-1995)

- Rev. W. R. A. Bond (1960-196?)
- Rev. Allen Wilson (196?-1973)
- Rev. Des Harman (1973-1986)
- Rev. Victor Stacey (1986-1995)

Finglas, Glasnevin and Santry (from 1995)

- Rev. Mark D. Gardner (1995-2001)
- Rev. David W. Oxley (2002-present)
