= Domvile baronets =

Domvile baronets may refer to:

- Domvile baronets (1686 creation) two baronets, extinct 1768
- Domvile baronets (1815 creation) four baronets, extinct 1935

== See also ==
- Domville baronets
- Poë-Domvile baronets
