= Sir William Domville, 1st Baronet =

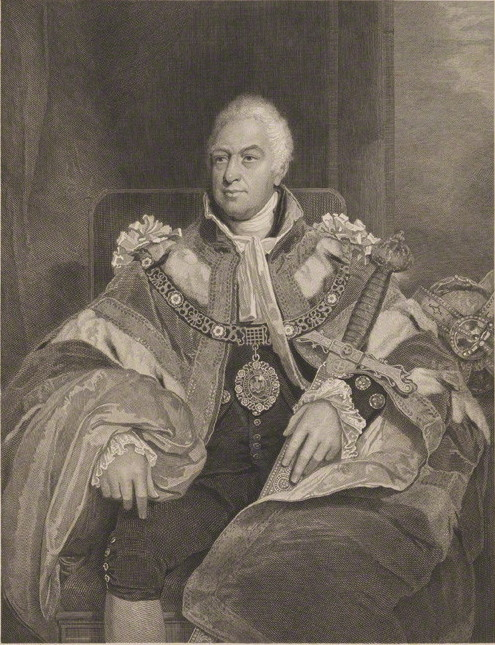
Sir William Domville

Sir William Domville, 1st Baronet (26 December 1742 – 8 February 1833) was Lord Mayor of London in 1813–1814.

He was born in St Albans, the son of Charles Domville of London and was a descendant of William Domville, elder brother of Gilbert Domvile, ancestor of the Domvile baronets of Templeogue. He set up in business as a bookseller in London before returning to live in St Albans.

He was Master of the Worshipful Company of Stationers and Newspaper Makers, a Sheriff of London for 1804–05 and Lord Mayor of London for 1813–14. In 1805 he was elected an Alderman of Queenhithe Ward and made a baronet in 1814.

He died on 8 February 1833 and was buried in St Albans Abbey. He had married Sally, the daughter of Archibald Finney and had two sons and five daughters.

Civic offices
Preceded by George Scholey	Lord Mayor of London; 1813 – 1814	Succeeded by Samuel Birch
Baronetage of the United Kingdom
New creation	Baronet (of St Albans); 1814–1833	Succeeded by William Domville
