= Compton Domvile =

Compton Domvile may refer to:

- Sir Compton Domvile, 2nd Baronet (c. 1650–1721), Irish politician, MP for County Dublin
- Sir Compton Domvile, 1st Baronet (c. 1775–1857), British politician, MP for Okehampton and Plympton Erle
- Compton Domvile (Royal Navy officer) (1842–1924), British naval commander
- Sir Compton Meade Domvile, 4th Baronet (1857–1935) of the Domvile Baronets

== See also ==
- Domvile (surname)
