= Domvile =

Domvile is a surname. Notable people with the surname include:

- Barry Domvile (1878–1971), British naval officer
- Compton Domvile (disambiguation), multiple people
- Domvile Baronets (disambiguation)

== See also ==
- Domville (disambiguation)
