= Henry Barry, 3rd Baron Barry of Santry =

Henry Barry, 3rd Baron Barry of Santry (1680 – 27 January 1734) was an Anglo-Irish soldier and official.

Barry was the son of Richard Barry, 2nd Baron Barry of Santry, and Elizabeth Jenery. He was educated at Eton College, leaving school in 1698, followed by St John's College, Oxford, matriculating in 1700. He had inherited his father's peerage in October 1694 and assumed his seat in the Irish House of Lords on 21 September 1703. He served on several committees in Parliament, aligning himself with the Whig faction and strongly supporting the Hanoverian succession.

He received a commission in the British Army and by 1710 he was a lieutenant colonel in the Earl of Wharton's Dragoons. On 30 November 1714, Barry was made a member of the Privy Council of Ireland. He was Governor of Charlemont in 1718, and between 1719 and his death he was Governor of Londonderry and Culmore.

Barry married Bridget Domvile, daughter of Sir Thomas Domvile, 1st Baronet, by whom he had one son, Henry, who succeeded to his title upon his death in 1734. Barry was responsible for rebuilding the family seat at Santry House, Dublin.

Military offices
Preceded by Thomas Meredyth	Governor of Londonderry; 1719–1734	Succeeded by Owen Wynne
Peerage of Ireland
Preceded by Richard Barry	Baron Barry of Santry; 1665–1734	Succeeded by Henry Barry
