= Scholey =

Scholey is a surname. Notable people with the surname include:

- Annabel Scholey (born 1984), English actress
- Keith Scholey (born 1957), British producer of nature documentaries
- George Scholey (died 1839), British banker
- Mathias J. Scholey (1867-1917), English war soldier and veteran
