= Henry Scardeville =

British Anglican priest in Ireland

Henry Scardeville (1654–1703) was an Anglican priest in Ireland in the second half of the 17th century and the very start of the eighteenth.

Scardeville was born in Salisbury attended school at Repton, and educated at Trinity College Dublin. Chaplain to the Williamite Duke Schomnerg. He was appointed rector of Cloghran in 1681, and prebend of Swords, County Dublin, in 1682. As Vicar of Swords, he was responsible in 1702 for adding the cross to the top of the Round Tower in Swords. He was Archdeacon of Ross and Dean of Cloyne until his death.

His first wife Mary Molesworth, daughter of Guy Molesworth of London, who died along with their child in childbirth., he married Margaret Culliford, from Derbyshire, with whom he had a son Frederick Maynhard, and a daughter Elizabeth.

Dr. Scardeville died on 3 February 1703, and was buried in the Chancel of Swords Church, in 1811 his tombstone and mural monument, were moved to the new St. Columbas Church, Swords, where they remain today.
