= J.S. Anna Liddiard =

Jane Susannah Anna Liddiard
- Born: Jane Susannah Anna Wilkinson; 29 April 1773; County Meath
- Died: October 1819 (aged 46); Corballis, County Dublin
- Resting place: Cloghran Church Graveyard, County Dublin
- Known for: poetry
- Notable work: The Sgelaighe
- Spouse: Rev. William Liddiard (1773-1841)
- Parent(s): Henry and Elizabeth Wilkinson
- Relatives: Rev. Henry Liddiard (1800=1864) son

J.S. Anna Liddiard (29 April 1773 – October 1819) was an Irish romantic poet whose work draws on themes of patriotism, Irish culture and history, landscape, and human relations.

== Life ==
Jane Susannah Anna Wilkinson was born in County Meath. She was the daughter of Sir Henry Wilkinson, of Corballis House, County Dublin. She married Rev. William Liddiard (1773–1841) on 12 February 1798, an Anglican clergyman of Wiltshire who was a poet, artist and retired army officer. He was the vicar of Culmullen, County Meath from 1807-1810, and then in the united parish of Knockmark from 1810-1831. Liddiard had one son, Henry Liddiard, born in 1800, who was sent to live with his grandfather Henry in Corballis House. He inherited the rectory of Knockmark, and in 1849 emigrated to Australia. Liddiard's death date is not officially recorded, but she appears to predeceased her husband, as he remarried in 1822. She appears to have died at Corballis, with The Bristol Mercury reported her death as 30 October. She is buried in the family plot, in the local church to Corballis house, Cloghran Church, with a monument installed in 1822, by her father, her father (died 1831) and her mother (died 1826) were subsequently interred there.

== Poetry and writing ==
Liddiard dedicated her book of Poems to her husband, published in Dublin in 1809. The couple moved to Bath in 1811, living there for 2 years. Whilst there she published The Sgelaighe or A tale of old in 1811, supposedly drawing on an old Irish manuscript. She describes her return from Bath to Ireland in Kenilworth and Farley Castle (1813). This book is addressed to the Ladies of Llangollen, whom she visited. In 1816, she published a tale in verse called Evening after the battle, which was published along with her husband's Mont St Jean, both pieces are based around the battle of Waterloo. An anonymous work Mount Leinster (1819) is usually ascribed to Liddiard, but could have been written by her husband.

Liddiard's verse is patriotic and romantic, in particular her poem Addressed to Albion and Conrade. Both Liddiard and her husband advocated for religious tolerance, with the work Mount Leinster blaming the 1798 Rebellion on the Penal Laws.
