= Hutcheson Poë =

Irish politician (1848–1934)

Sir Hutcheson Poë
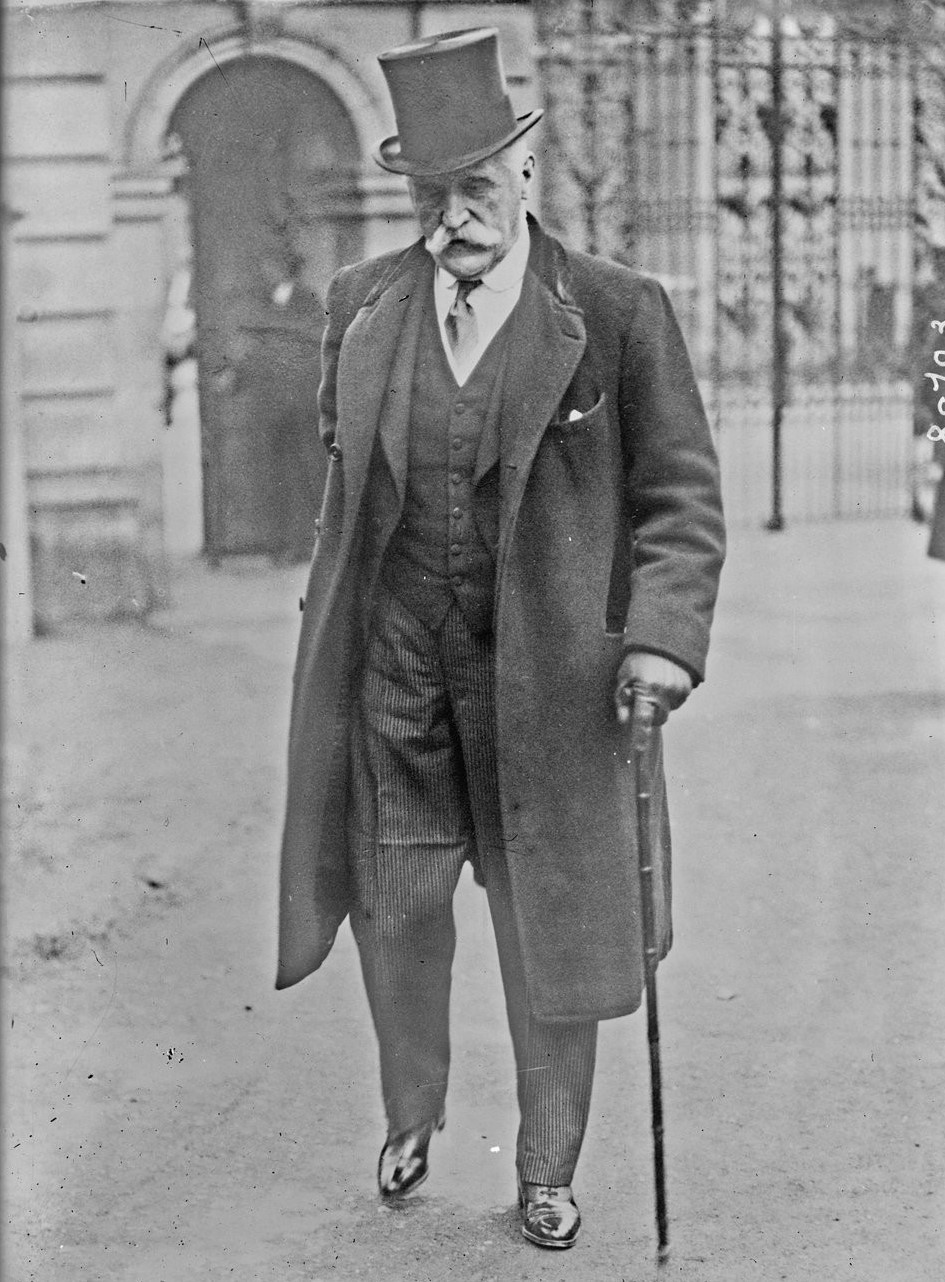
- Hutcheson Poë in 1922

Senator
- In office 11 December 1922 – 9 December 1924

Personal details
- Born: William Hutcheson Poë; 20 September 1848 Donaghadee, County Down, Ireland
- Died: 30 November 1934 (aged 86) Littlehampton, England
- Party: Independent; Irish Unionist Alliance
- Spouse: Mary Adelaide Domvile (m. 1886)
- Children: 2
- Education: Royal Naval Academy, Gosport

Military service
- Allegiance: Royal Marines
- Rank: Lieutenant colonel

Hutcheson Poë
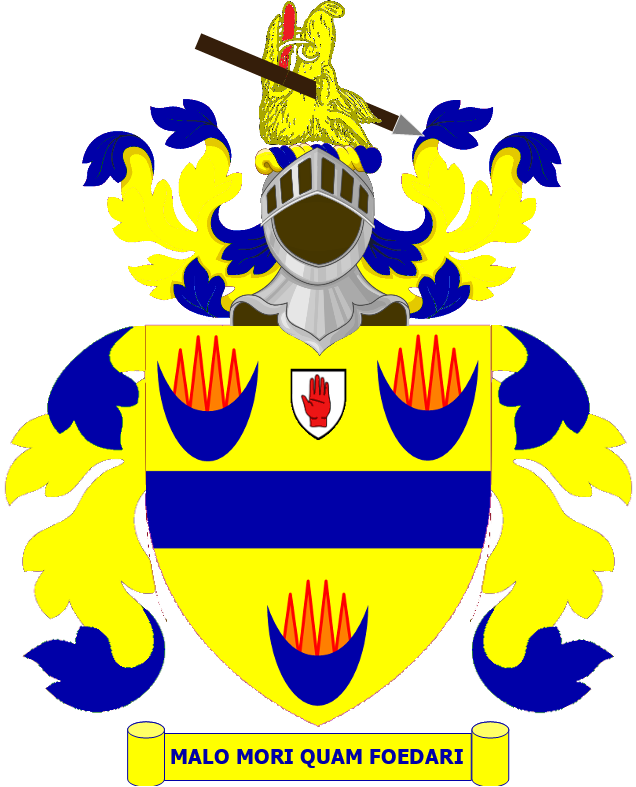
- Crest: A boar's head erect couped Or pierced with a broken spear proper.
- Shield: Or a fesse between three crescents Azure issuing flames proper.
- Motto: Malo Mori Quam Foedari (Death rather than dishonour)

Sir William Hutcheson Poë, 1st Baronet (20 September 1848 – 30 November 1934) was an Irish soldier and politician.

== Early life ==
He was born the younger son of William T. Poë in Donaghadee, County Down. His younger brother was Sir Edmund Poë, who would become an Admiral in the Royal Navy. An older brother, George Leslie Poë, became a Royal Navy Captain.

== Military career ==
William Poë joined the Royal Marines in 1867. From 1878 to 1881, he commanded the Royal Marine detachment on Ascension Island. He served in the Mahdist War with the rank of major in 1884 and was wounded at the Second Battle of El Teb on February 29 1884. He commanding a unit of the Egyptian Camel Transport Corps in the Relief of Khartoum in 1885. However, he was hit in the thigh by a bullet at the Battle of Metammeh on the 19 January, requiring the leg to be amputated Subsequently he served in the Naval Intelligence Department and was prompted to lieutenant-colonel. He retired from the Royal Marines in 1888.

== Later career ==
After leaving military service, Poë settled in Ireland, living at Heywood House, Ballinakill. In Ireland, he owned 10,000 acres of land in County Tyrone and 1,500 acres in Queen's County.

He was a Justice of the Peace and Deputy Lieutenant for Queen's County and was appointed High Sheriff of Queen's County for 1891 and High Sheriff of Tyrone for 1893. In the 1895 general election, he stood as the Irish Unionist Alliance candidate for the Queen's County Ossory division, but lost badly to the incumbent, Eugene Crean. He was a member of the Land Conference in 1902. In 1906, the Lord Lieutenant of Ireland made him a member of a commission to report on the state of Irish railways. He was created a baronet on 2 July 1912 by George V.

During World War I, he served in Egypt from 1915 to 1916; from 1916 to 1919, he served was with the Red Cross in France. After the war, he was the last Lord Lieutenant of Queen's County from 1920 to 1922, a position that ceased to exist when the Irish Free State became independent.

Following the Partition of Ireland, Poë was nominated as an independent member of Seanad Éireann by the President of the Executive Council in 1922. He resigned from the Seanad on 9 December 1924, on age and health grounds. Douglas Hyde was elected at a by-election to replace him.

== Interests ==
During his lifetime, Poë collected art. One of the works he owned, a portrait of John Musters by Sir Joshua Reynolds, is now in the collection of the United States National Gallery of Art In 1904, Poë became a governor of the National Gallery of Ireland. In 1931, he donated a 1690s painting by Jan Weenix to the gallery.

One of Poë's recreations was grouse shooting, though he was obliged to do this while seated on a pony due to the loss of his leg.

== Family ==
In 1886, Poë married Mary Adelaide Domvile, only surviving daughter of Sir William Compton Domvile, 3rd Baronet. They had one daughter, Isabel-May (b. 1893), and one son, Hugo (1889–1959), who became the 2nd and last Baronet.

== Legacy ==
In 1906, Poë commissioned Edwin Lutyens and Gertrude Jekyll to develop the gardens around Heywood House. The house was destroyed by fire in the 1950s, but the gardens still exist. They have been described as "one of the most beautiful formal gardens in Ireland".

== See also ==
- Poë-Domvile baronets

Honorary titles
Preceded by Sir Algernon Coote, Bt	Lord Lieutenant of Queen's County; 1920–1922	Office abolished
Baronetage of the United Kingdom
New creation	Baronet (of Heywood, Queen's County); 1912–1934	Succeeded by Sir Hugo Compton Domvile Poë
