= Míne Bean Uí Chribín =

Irish activist, writer and postmaster (1927–2012)

- Born: Christine Philomena Lawless; 20 December 1927; Santry, Dublin, Ireland
- Died: 6 August 2012 (aged 84)
- Other name: Mena Cribben
- Occupations: Activist; writer; postmaster
- Spouse: Gus Ó Cribín (died)
- Children: 6

Míne Bean Uí Chribín (Note: Also cited as Mena Cribben.) (née Christine Philomena Lawless; 20 December 1927 – 6 August 2012) was an Irish traditionalist catholic activist, writer and postmaster. Uí Chribín was best known for her campaigning against contraception, abortion, divorce and sex education in schools during the 70s, 80s and 90s. In 2009, Uí Chribín garnered controversy during the Roscommon incest case for her alleged involvement in securing a High Court order which prevented the authorities from taking the children into care.

== Early life and family ==
Uí Chribín was born Christine Philomena Lawless on 20 December 1927 in Santry, Dublin. In 1956, Uí Chribín married Gus Ó Chribín (né Augustine Cribbin). The couple had six children, including Áine Ní Chribín who spent 17 years as a nun in the Palmarian Catholic Church before returning to Ireland; this was the subject of a TG4 documentary in 2000.

The wider family had briefly been associated with the Palmarians in the 1970s, however for Míne Bean Uí Chribín herself this was only for a brief time until she became associated with the Society of St. Pius X and after the death of John Paul II, the Indult Catholic community.

== Career ==
After she finished school, she worked at the Department of Posts and Telegraphs from 1944 to 1952. Her father was postmaster in Santry, and she took a job as an assistant there in 1953. She succeeded him in the post after his death in 1963 and worked there until she was hospitalized in 2012.

=== Women's Catholic organisations ===
She was involved with two political organisations, Mná na hÉireann (Women of Ireland), founded in Cork in 1970, and the Irish Housewives Union, founded by Úna Mhic Mhathúna. Both organisations criticised women's liberation and the availability of contraception, as well as the legalisation of divorce and abortion. She was also alleged to have had some involvement with Cóir, a Eurosceptic lobby group.

The Irish Housewives Union regularly interrupted meetings of the Anti-Amendment campaign in the run-up to the referendum on abortion of 1983.

She appeared frequently on The Late Late Show on television, representing conservative Roman Catholics and serving as a "barometer" for conservative opinions. During an interview, she compared divorce to adultery.

In an interview with The Irish Times in May 1985, regarding proposed family planning legislation, Uí Chribín said that it was "classic of the rottenness of our society" and of divorce, he said "it is just a connived issue, concocted by a small group, but they have the media".

In an interview by Aodhán Madden in New Hibernian magazine in June 1985, when asked about relationships that had irrevocably broken down she said "We [the Irish Housewives Union] have never found an irrevocably broken down marriage, never." On homosexuality she said "It's just not natural to be a homosexual. You show me anywhere in the whole of nature where homosexuality is natural?" She also said it was "a by-product of contraception."

In 1994 she insisted that Scoil Paipín Naofa, a national school run on land owned by her, teach traditionalist Catholicism. The resulting row led to many parents removing their children from the school.

=== Involvement in Roscommon Case ===
In 2009, allegations emerged that she had helped parents obtain a High Court injunction to prevent children being taken into care in an incest case in County Roscommon.

During the case, a Health Service Executive childcare manager said that Uí Chribín had contacted him to argue that the family needed support, not intrusion. He admitted that he had no evidence she was involved in the application, but suspected she was. She denied having any part in the application, saying she would not believe a "Hail Mary" from healthcare workers.

The mother in the case was jailed for offences including incest, sexual assault and neglect of her children.

In a statement to the Irish Independent, Uí Chribín denied providing any financial or legal assistance in the case and said that any help was "given in good faith". She said she was "shocked to learn of the revelations that have unfolded", accusing State officials of trying to scapegoat her to "deflect blame."

The Health Service Executive report into the case was released in 2010 and did not name anyone, though it did say a "Mrs B" contacted the Garda Síochána (police) after the High Court injunction was granted in October 2000. It also stated that a "Mrs B" wrote to the Minister for Children, asking the minister to stop the Western Health Board from "persecuting" the family.

=== Writing ===
Ballymun Cross book cover

She wrote several books, including a novel based on how her parents met, a social history of Ballymun Cross and three books in Irish. Until she was hospitalised in 2012, she wrote for An Timire, a Catholic magazine in Irish, and wrote a children's column Eoghanín.
