= St. Canice's Church, Finglas (Church of Ireland) =

Church of Ireland church

Coordinates: 53.388392°N 6.302399°W

St. Canice's Church is a Church of Ireland church on the northern side of Church Street, in Finglas, Dublin. It was built in 1843 and dedicated by Richard Whately, Archbishop of Dublin, to replace an earlier church at the site of St. Canice’s early monastery. Following the building of the new church the old church was still used as a vestry for some years.

The glebe-house was erected in 1826, supported by a gift and loan from the Board of First Fruits.

Finglas was constituted as the fifth prebend of St. Patrick's Cathedral, Dublin when Henry de Londres changed the status of that church in 1191, and Pope Alexander III confirmed the Archbishop's possession of Finglas, with the Chancellor holding the prebend from 1218 to 2007. In 2007 it was made into an ecumenical canon of the cathedral.

The Medieval Church in Finglas controlled a number of Chapels such as Donaghmore / Dovemachenor (St. Margarets), de Villa de Reimundi Labos (St. Brigids, Ward) and De Tirceyn (Artane, dedicated to St. Nicholas).

Finglas Parochial National School is located on land beside the church and is under the patronage of the Church of Ireland.

In 1995 it merged with Santry and Glasnevin to form the Santry (St. Pappan's), Glasnevin (St. Mobhi's) and Finglas Grouping of Parishes.

St Patrick's Well is situated to the north of the church.

St. Canice's Church graveyard, the site of the ruins of the old church, was entrusted to Dublin Corporation in the 1950s. Among the graves is the tomb of Baron John Pocklington,an English MP, lawyer and judge.

== Notable people ==
- James Ussher of Armagh, served as Prebend of Finglas from 1605.
- Thomas Parnell, poet, was rector from 1716 to 1718
- Theophilus Bolton of Cashel, served as vicar of Finglas from 1720 to 1722.
- Robert Howard of Killala, served as vicar of Finglas from 1723 to 1727.
- James Stopford, vicar from 1727 until his elevation in 1753 to Cloyne
- Robert Walsh, writer, historian (who discovered the Nethercross), abolitionist and physician, was curate from 1806-1820 and later Rector from 1839 until his death in 1851
