= John Baird (Irish divine) =

Irish divine (18th century)

John Baird, D.D. (died 1804), was an Irish divine.

Baird came to Dublin from the Isle of Man, and was ordained minister of the Presbyterian congregation of Capel Street on 11 January 1767. Here he ministered for ten years despondently, and in 1777, was compelled to resign, and was replaced by Rev. Benjamin McDowell. Shortly after resigning, he brought out the first and only volume of a projected series on the Old Testament; a work of previous learning, originally delivered as lectures at Capel Street, and dedicated it (12 November 1777) to James Trail, bishop of Down. Baird soon afterwards conformed, and on 7 September 1782 was appointed by the crown to the rectory of Cloghran Parish Church (Church of Ireland), Cloghran, near Dublin, where he died unmarried early in 1804. He published 'Dissertations, Chronological, Historical, and Critical, of all the Books of the Old Testament; through which are interspersed Reflections, Theological and Moral,' &c., Dublin, 1778, vol. i. (extending to Exod. xx.)
