= Domville =

Domville may refer to:

- Domville, Ontario
- Domville, Queensland, a locality in the Toowoomba Region, Australia
- Domville baronets
- Guy Domville, an 1895 play by Henry James

== People ==
- James Domville (1842–1921)
- William Domville (1609–1689)

== See also ==
- Domvile
