= Heywood House and Gardens =

House and garden in County Laois, Ireland

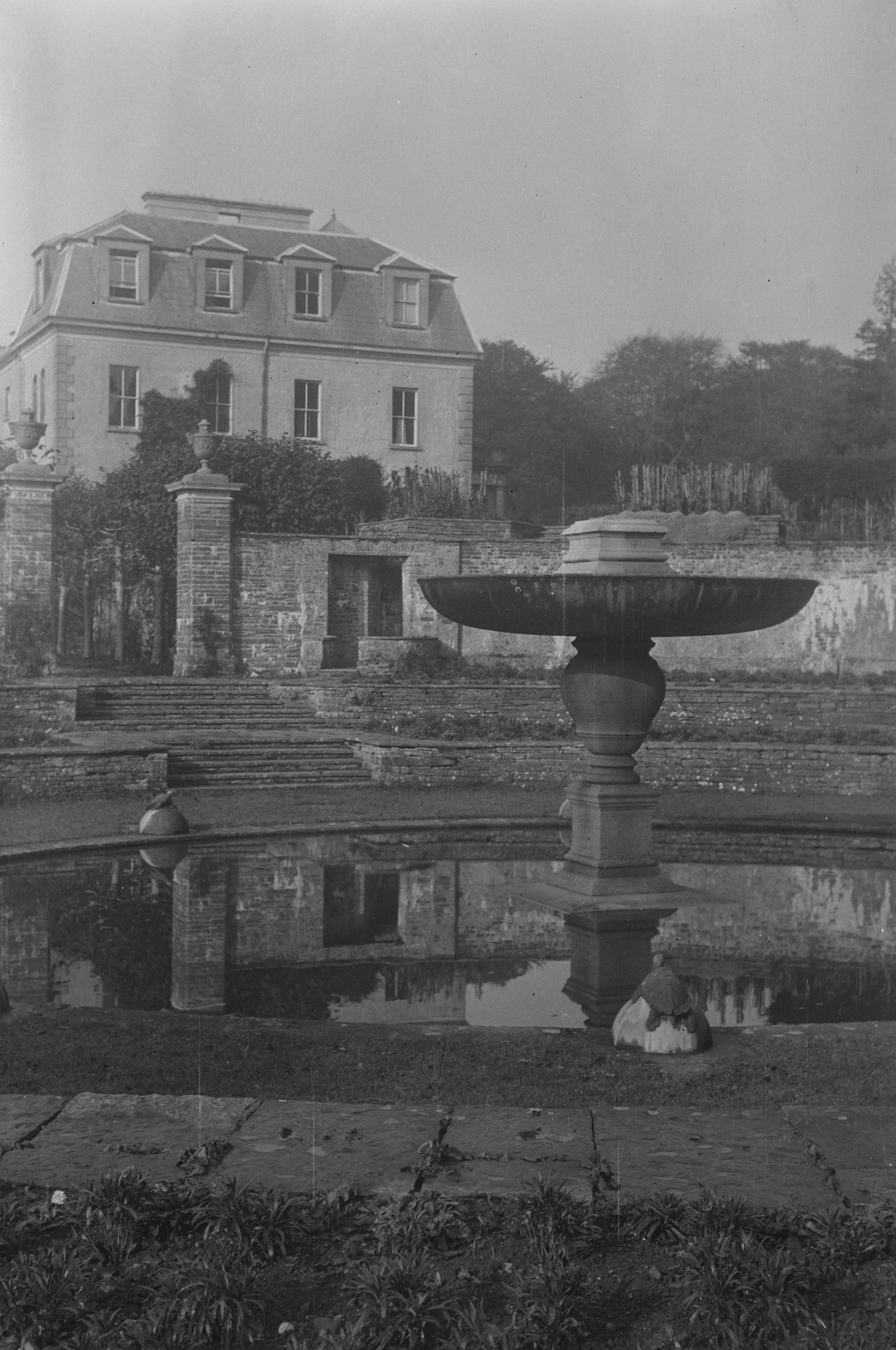
- The house and gardens in 1942

General information
- Status: Private dwelling house
- Type: House
- Architectural style: Georgian
- Classification: Demolished
- Location: Ballinakill, County Laois, Ireland, Ireland
- Coordinates: 52.8843°N 7.3008°W
- Estimated completion: 1773
- Demolished: 1951
- Owner: Office of Public Works

Technical details
- Floor count: 3

Design and construction
- Architects: James Gandon and Michael Frederick Trench
- Developer: Michael Frederick Trench

Renovating team
- Architect: Edwin Lutyens (1906-1912) - gardens

Heywood House and Gardens is a Georgian house and gardens in County Laois, Ireland.

The estate was developed in the late 18th century by Michael Frederick Trench, a politician, landowner and architect. He built a substantial house and laid out an extensive park, under the direction of James Gandon. In the early 20th century, Heywood was owned by Sir Hutcheson Poë who commissioned Edwin Lutyens to develop the gardens immediately surrounding the house. Lutyens engaged his long-time collaborator Gertrude Jekyll to undertake the planting.

The house was demolished after a fire in 1950 and the gardens are now in the care of the Office of Public Works.

== History and architecture ==
Michael Frederick Trench built Heywood House and developed the surrounding estate in conjunction with James Gandon. The resulting parkland was considered by contemporaries to be one of the finest 18th century Romantic landscapes in Ireland.

The estate descended by marriage to the Poë family in the 19th century, when Colonel Hutcheson Poë married Mary Adelaide Compton Domvile in 1886.

In 1906, Poë determined on the development of a new garden immediately adjacent to the house. The recommendation for Edwin Lutyens came from the colonial administrator Henry McMahon, who knew Lutyens personally. By this date Lutyens had established himself as one of England's leading architects of country houses and gardens. In his study of English domestic buildings, Das englische Haus, published in 1904, Hermann Muthesius had written of him, "He is a young man who has come increasingly to the forefront of domestic architects and who may soon become the accepted leader among English builders of houses".

The site Lutyens was required to develop was unpromising; Heywood was set high on an elevated embankment with little space on the garden front between the house and an "enormous cliff-like buttress" which separated the house from the parkland. Lutyens responded with the creation of a terrace linking a series of small garden rooms and leading to a circular Italian garden at the western end. The garden contains an oval pool, surrounded by turtles and with a fountain at its centre. It also includes salvaged corinthian capitals from the House of Commons chamber of Parliament House, Dublin. Gertrude Jekyll undertook the planting. Poë was reputed to have spent £250,000 on the redevelopment of the house and estate.

Christopher Hussey, in his official biography The Life of Sir Edwin Lutyens, records that the Heywood scheme, ‘though architecturally superb, proved very much more costly than the client had contemplated". (Note: Lutyens did not find Sir Hutchenson an easy client, his frustrations were expressed in a series of letters to his wife: "Colonel Poë has a wooden leg and he sits on a chair and watches the men lay stones and finds endless fault. I couldn't stand it."(7 February 1910); "The gardens promise well, but he is so cross to his workmen, to me and to all under him".(30 August 1912))

Following Poë's death in 1934 the house was left empty until it was purchased in 1941 by the Salesian Brothers for the establishment of a seminary. During their tenure, the house was almost destroyed in a fire on 31 January 1950. It was subsequently demolished. The seminary moved to a new site and the gardens passed into the care of the Office of Public Works.

== Gallery ==
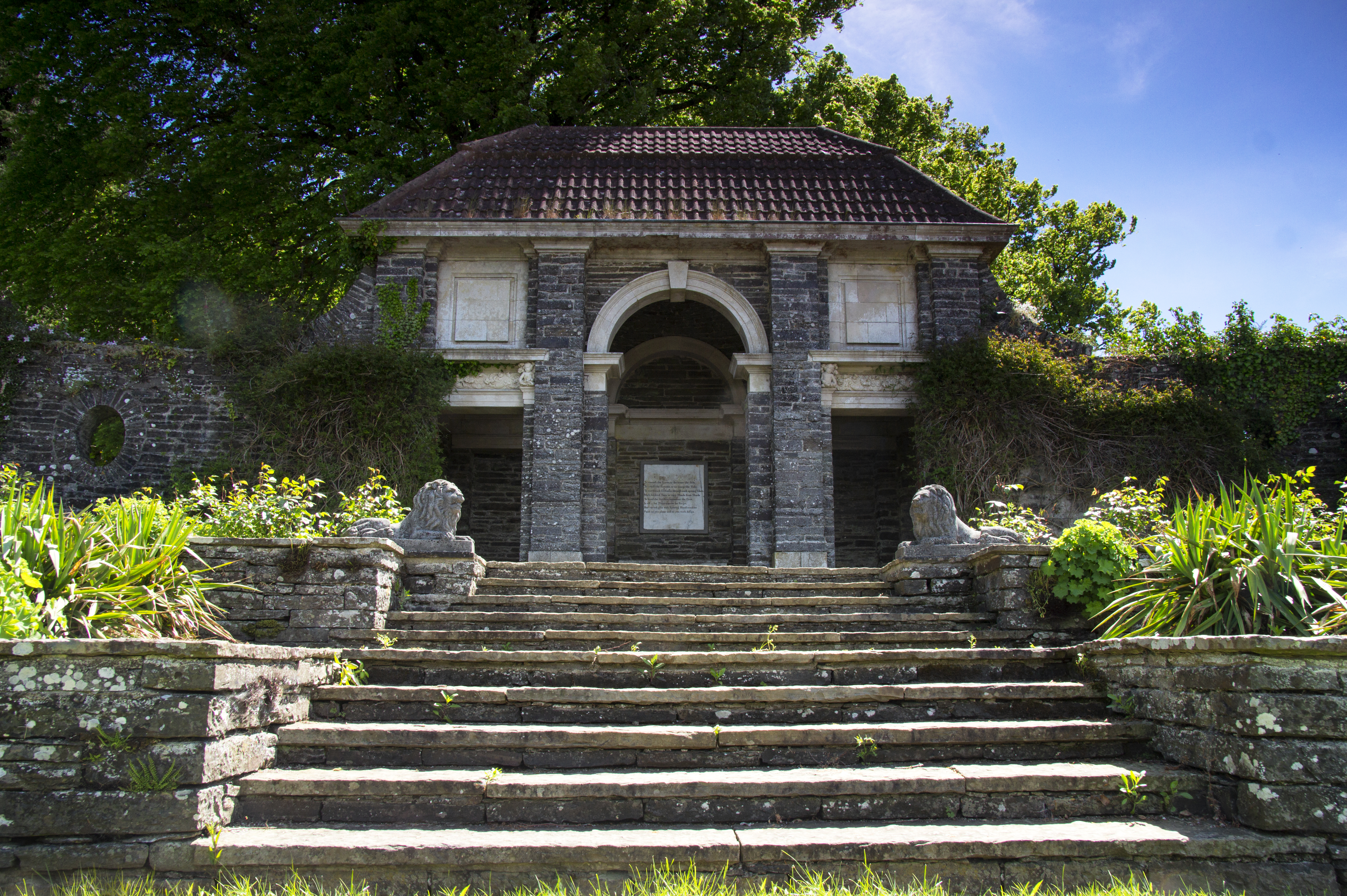
The summerhouse in the Italian Garden

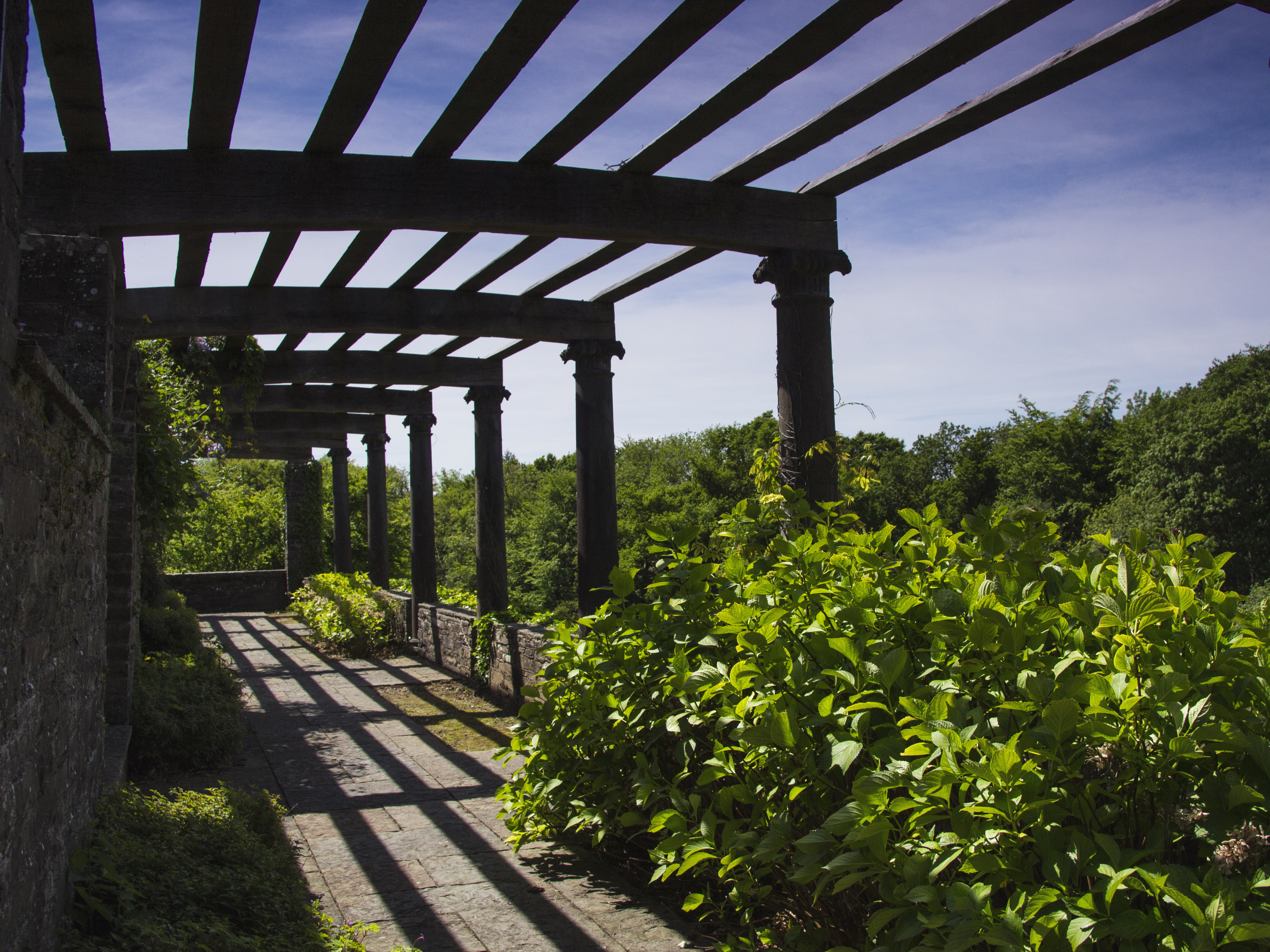
The Pergola

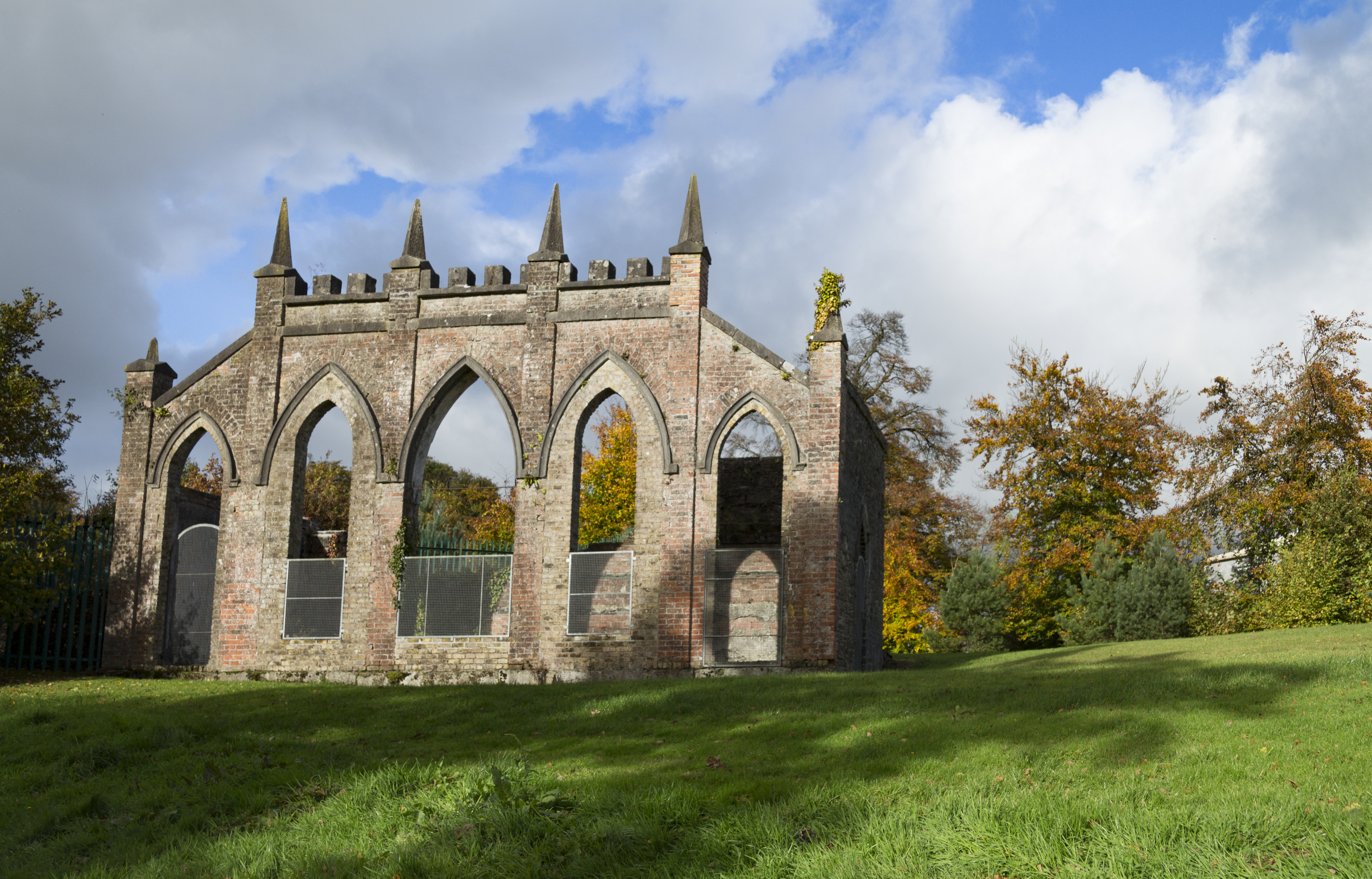
The Gothic Summerhouse

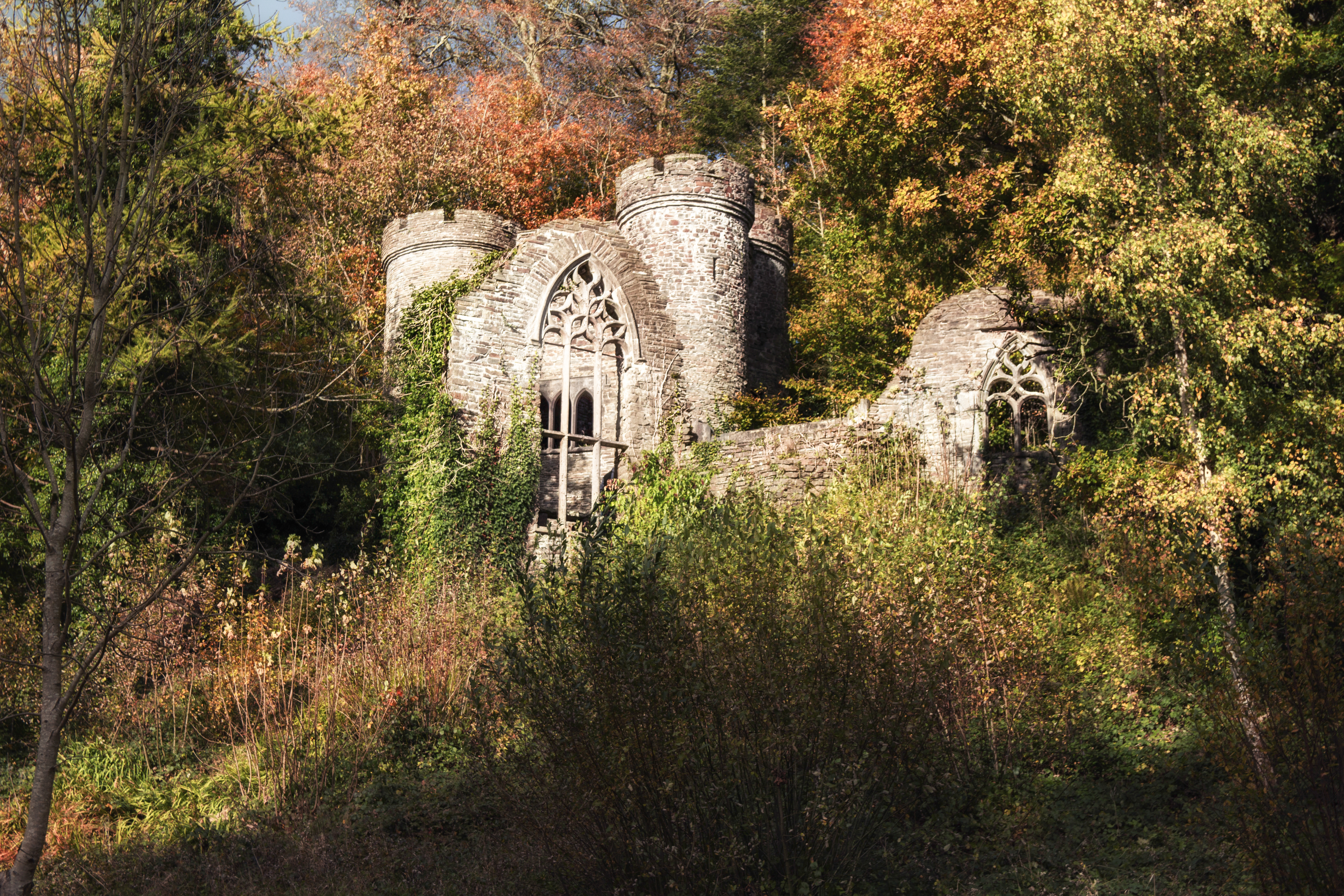
The Sham Castle

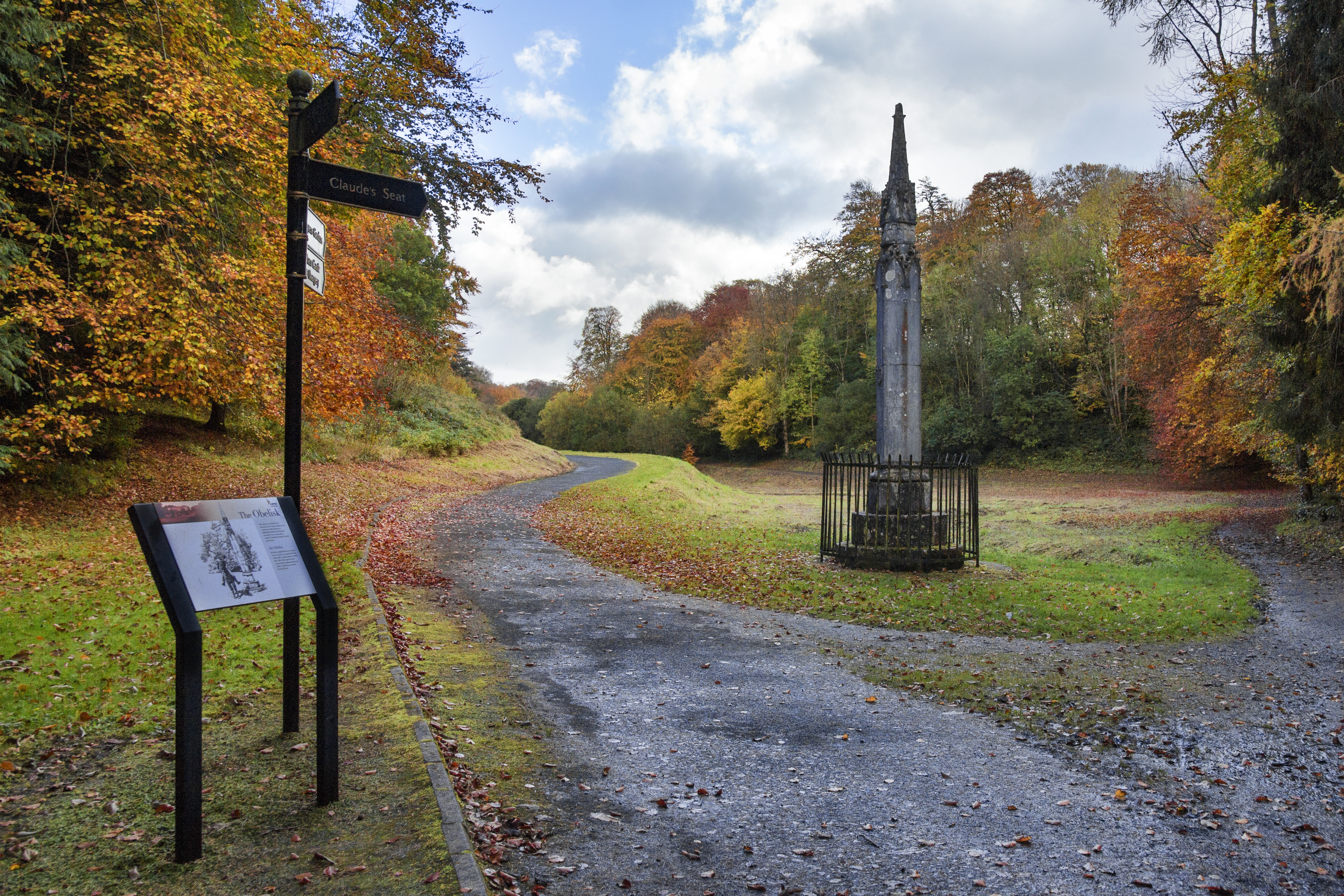
The Obelisk

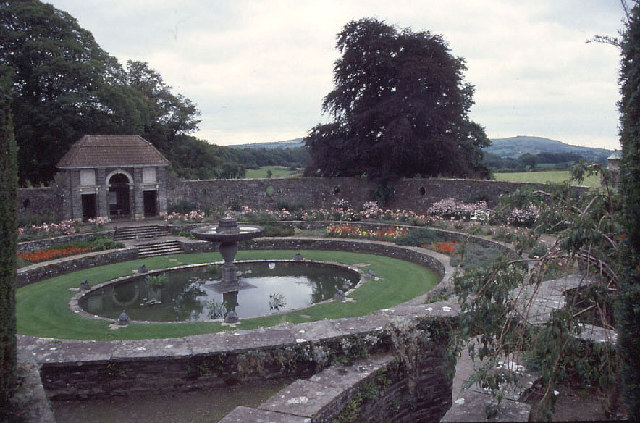
Circular sunken garden

== Sources ==
- Amery, Colin; Richardson, Margaret; Stamp, Gavin (1981). Lutyens: The Work of the English Architect Sir Edwin Lutyens. London: Arts Council of Great Britain. ISBN 978-0-728-70303-2.
- Brown, Jane (1982). Gardens of a Golden Afternoon - The Story of a Partnership: Edwin Lutyens and Gertrude Jekyll. London: Penguin Books. ISBN 978-0-140-08021-6. OCLC 958950074.
- Hussey, Christopher (1989) [1950]. The Life of Sir Edwin Lutyens. Woodbridge: Antique Collectors Club. ISBN 978-0-907-46259-0.
- Lutyens, Edwin (1985). Clayre Percy; Jane Ridley (eds.). The Letters of Edwin Lutyens to his wife Lady Emily. London: Collins. ISBN 978-0-002-17063-5. OCLC 905461764.
- Muthesius, H. (1979) [1904]. The English House (Single volume ed.). Frogmore: Granada Publishing. ISBN 978-0-258-97101-7.
