= Cloghran Parish Church (Church of Ireland) =

Former church in County Dublin, Ireland

Coordinates: 53.432911°N 6.227834°W

Cloghran Parish Church was a Church of Ireland church for an ancient parish in the Barony of Coolock in northern County Dublin, 1.5 miles (2.4 km) south of Swords, County Dublin. It was also known as Cloghran-Swords to distinguish it from another parish of the same name Cloghran, Castleknock in western Dublin. Cloghran was united to Santry in 1872 by decision of the Dublin Diocesan Synod The graveyard is all that remains following the demolition of the church structure. The graveyard includes burials of Catholics as well as Protestants.

== History ==
A medieval structure dated from as early as 1190 was erected by Owen Gmyneth (Owain Gwynedd), a Welsh prince and Lord Cloghran. The more recent Cloghran Parish Church was built in 1712 on the site of a previous structure. It was described by Lewis (1837) as a very plain and simple edifice capable of seating 100. The Glebe of Portmarnock was built in 1791 on Cloghran church lands, while detached from its main parish area), became a townland of Portmarnock Civil Parish.

The Cloghran glebe-house was built in 1822, funded by the Board of First Fruits. In the 1830s, divine service was celebrated weekly on Sundays and on Christmas Day; the Sacrament was administered six times a year. The parish merged with Santry in 1872 with Rector Dr. Adams becoming Rector of Santry as well.

The church ceased to operate as such at the end of the 19th century. The church still stood until the Second World War, and was controversially demolished in 1944 by the remaining parishioners. The Glebe House became part of Cloghran Stud farm (which was highly successful in racing in the 20th century), and there is a preservation order on the building, in 1992 Aer Rianta, the airport authority bought the stud farm.

There are records of an earlier church Glynshaugh Church (Clonshaugh), on the townland of Middleton, in Barony of Coolock, (off the Stockhole lane), in 1189 Pope Clement III granted it, as part of the Parish of Santry, to St. Mary's Abbey, Dublin. In Rector Adams History of Santry and Cloghran, notes the church and graveyard was completely destroyed by 1820 and the land ploughed up for farming.

== Rectors/Vicars of Cloghran ==
- 1217 - Rev. Richard Locard
- 1399 - Rev. William Taylor
- 1473 - Rev. Thomas Mayow
- 1525 - Rev. Thomas Geralde
- 1591 - Rev. Thomas Kegan
- 1595 - Rev. James Kegan (Keysar or Keane) a1so 1597-1622 Rathangan and Dunboyne)
- 1610 - Rev. Patrick Beaghan, with St. Doulough's, Swords, Malahide, Portmarnock and Baldoyle
- 1618 - Rev. Nicholas Meyler
- 1630 - Rev. Nicholas Culme
- 1642 - Rev. Alexander Harfield, A.M.
- 1642 - Rev. James Kerdiff, A.M.
- 1646 - Rev. Thomas Marshall, A.M.
- 1674 - Rev. Michael Heweston, with Swords from 1672 to 1678
- 1680 - Rev. Garrett Barry, with since 1678 Swords
- 1671 - Rev. Henry Scardeville, with Swords, later Dean of Cloyne
- 1705 - Rev. Gilbert Deane
- 1711 - Rev. Richard Bambrigqe(Bambrick), overseen the building of the new church
- 1724 - Rev. Dr. John Wynne, D.D.,
- 1762 - Rev. Joseph Davies, A.B.
- 1780 - Rev. Mark Wainwright, A.B.
- 1781 - Rev. Edward Synge, A.M.
- 1782 - Rev. Dr. John Baird (Irish Divine), formerly a Presbyterian Minister 1767–1777
- 1804 - Rev. William Henry Lyster, A.B.
- 1816 - Rev. Dr. Stewart Segar Trench, LL.D. - with Swords
- 1831 - Rev. Edmond Jonas Lewis, A.M.
- 1854 - Rev. Dr. Benjamin W. Adams, DD

Cloghran and Santry, 1876

- 1876 - Rev. Dr. Benjamin W. Adams, first rector of Santry and Cloghran
- 1887 - Rev. J.W. Tristram, served as curate (1880–1887), following merger in 1887 with Glasnevin, parish became known as United Parish of Glasnevin and Santry

The Ven. Dr. John Jackson, of Woodlands House, Clonshaugh, served as Curate in Cloghran-Swords 1742, Vicar from 1745 while serving as Vicar of Coolock 1745–60, others who served in Cloghran during Dr. Wynne's rectorship include, from 1738, Rev. Robert Fisher, A.M., from 1758, Rev. William Taveraer, A.B. and from 1759, Rev. Bellingham Swan, A.M.

== Cloghran Church graveyard ==
There was a monument (by the architect John Hughes) to Sir Henry Wilkinson of Corballis House (now Dublin Airport), he was guardian for Cloghran and Swords, among the family members buried there is Henry's daughter the poet J.S. Anna Liddiard.

The William H. Lyster the former rector, was buried in 1833 to the side of the nave of the church, a number of other members of the Lyster family are buried in the churchyard.

The graveyard was derelict for over fifty years (last burials in the 1940s), but in the early 2000s the local Cloghran Historical Society, organised to clean up and restore the graveyard. The society also organised an ecumenical service to be held in the graveyard.
