= Domvile baronets (1686 creation) =

Extinct baronetcy in the Baronetage of Ireland

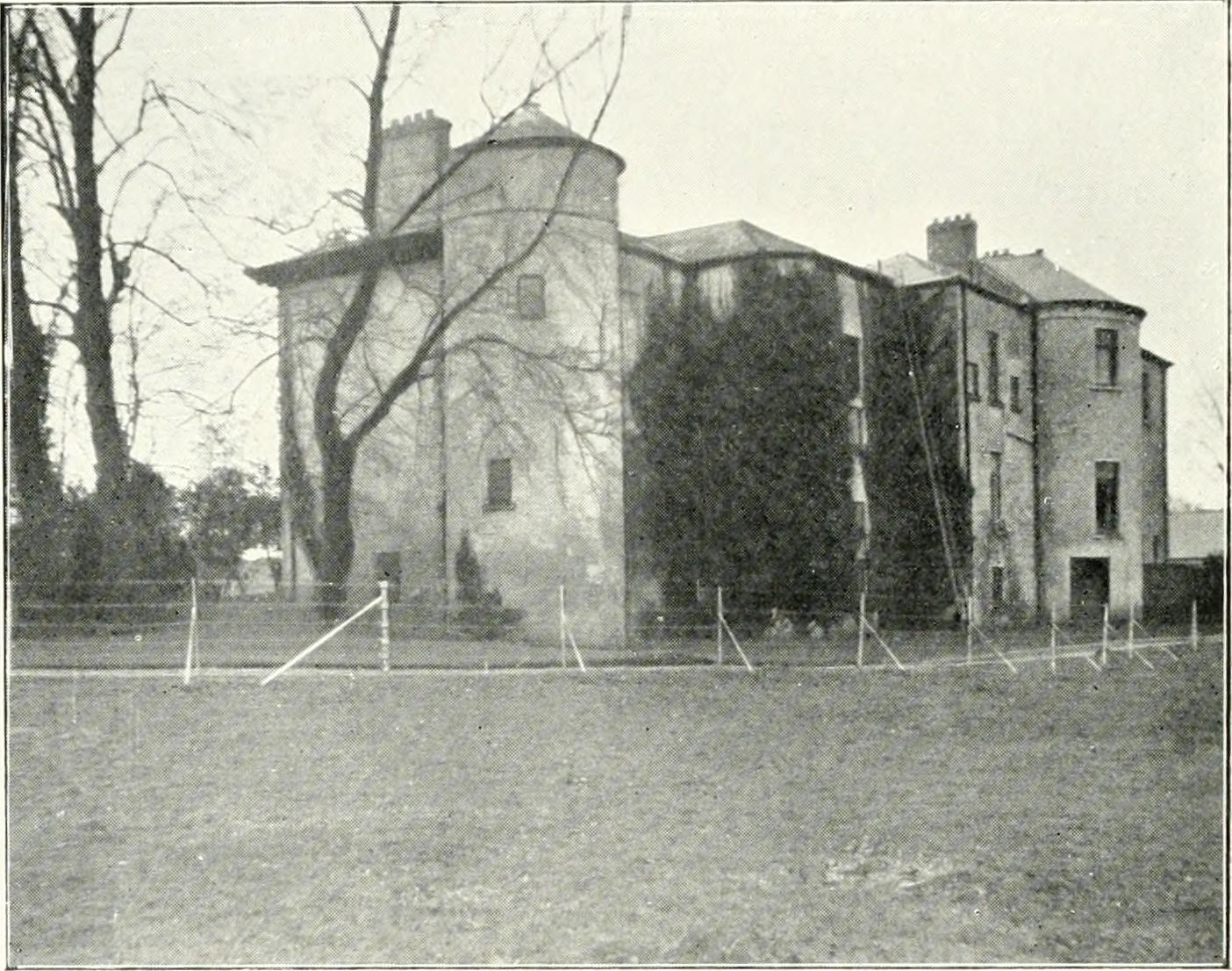
Templeogue House in 1902 incorporating the remains of a medieval fortified house.

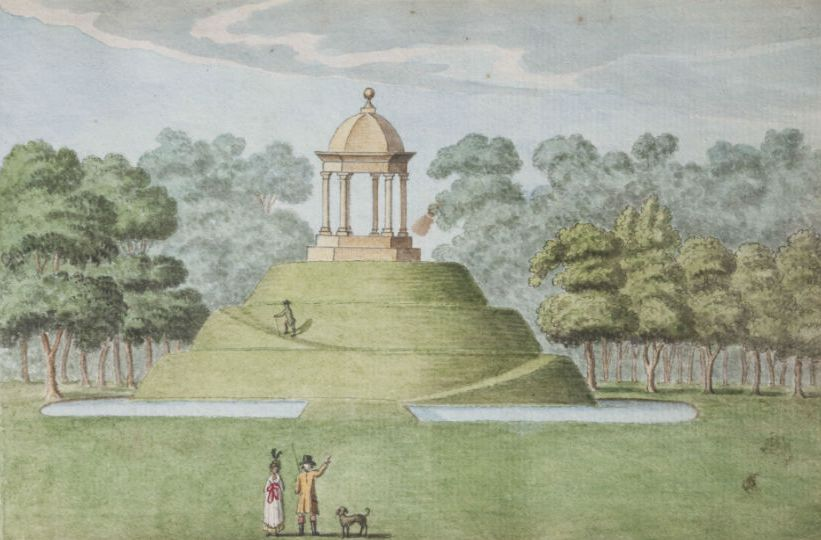
Folly temple at Templeogue from a Gabriel Beranger illustration of around 1751.

The Domvile Baronetcy, of Templeogue in the County of Dublin, was created in the Baronetage of Ireland on 21 December 1686 for Thomas Domvile, who represented Mullingar in the Irish House of Commons. He was the son of William Domville (Attorney-General for Ireland), son of Gilbert Domville, MP for Dublin, member of an ancient Cheshire family. The second Baronet was a member of the Irish Parliament for County Dublin. The title became extinct on his death in 1768. Sir William Domvile, brother of the first Baronet, represented Armagh and Dublin in the Irish Parliament. William Domville, elder brother of the aforementioned Gilbert Domvile, was the ancestor of the Domville baronets of St Alban's.

- Sir Thomas Domvile, 1st Baronet (c. 1650–1721)
- Sir Compton Domvile, 2nd Baronet (1696–1768)

== See also ==
- Domvile baronets (1815 creation)
- Domville baronets
- Poë-Domvile baronets
