= Baron Barry of Santry =

Title in the peerage of Ireland

Baron Barry of Santry, in the County of Dublin, was a title in the Peerage of Ireland. It was created in 1661 for the Irish lawyer and politician Sir James Barry, a former Member of the Irish Parliament for Lismore and Lord Chief Justice of Ireland. His grandson, the third Baron, served as Governor of Londonderry and of Culmore Fort and was sworn of the Irish Privy Council. The third Baron's son, the fourth Baron, was convicted and sentenced to death for murder in 1739 and his title declared forfeit. However, he was pardoned the following year and restored to his title. On his death eleven years later, in 1751, the barony became extinct.

Alderman Richard Barry, father of the first Baron, was a wealthy merchant who served as Mayor of Dublin in 1610 and sat in the Irish House of Commons as a representative for the City of Dublin in 1613-15 and 1634-35. Alderman Barry bought the lands in Santry in the late 16th century from the Nugent family

== Barons Barry of Santry (1661) ==
- James Barry, 1st Baron Barry of Santry (1603–1673)
- Richard Barry, 2nd Baron Barry of Santry (1637–1694)
- Henry Barry, 3rd Baron Barry of Santry (1680–1734)
- Henry Barry, 4th Baron Barry of Santry (1710–1751)
