= George Scholey =

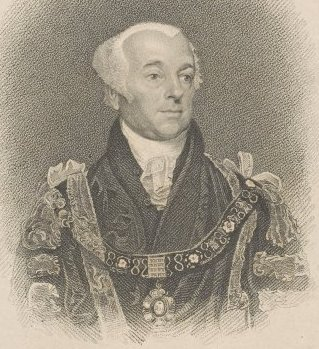
George Scholey, Lord Mayor of London

George Scholey (died 1839) was a banker who served as Lord Mayor of London in 1812. Scholey was appointed an alderman in the City of London's Dowgate ward in 1804. He had previously been elected one of the Sheriffs of the City of London in 1804. Scholey was born in 1758, the son of the Cock and Bottle's landlord in Sandal, Wakefield. Scholey died in 1839, leaving £10,000 to Sandal, half for the poor of Sandal and half to the trustees of the Sandal Endowed School."Sandal History". "George Scholey Biography".

Civic offices
Preceded by Sir Claudius Hunter, Bt	Lord Mayor of London; 1812-1813	Succeeded by Sir William Domville, 1st Baronet
