= Peter Carleton (priest) =

Peter Carleton was an Anglican priest in Ireland in the eighteenth century.

Carleton was born in Dublin and educated at Trinity College, Dublin. He was Dean of Killaloe from 1790 until 1808; and Prebendary of Aghadowey in Derry Cathedral from 1808 until his resignation in 1813.
