= Lady Margaret Domville =

Irish aristocrat and writer (1840–1929)

- Born: Lady Margaret Frances St Lawrence; 1840
- Died: 9 January 1929 (aged 88–89)
- Occupations: Aristocrat, writer
- Spouse(s): Sir Charles Domville, 2nd Bt. (m. 1861; died 1884)
- Parents: Thomas St Lawrence, 3rd Earl of Howth; Lady Emily de Burgh
- Writing career
- Subjects: History, religion

Lady Margaret Frances Domville (née St Lawrence; 1840 – 9 January 1929) was an Irish aristocrat and a writer. She was also the daughter of the 3rd Earl of Howth and the wife of Sir Charles Compton Domville, 2nd Bt.

== Biography ==
Lady Margaret Frances St Lawrence was born in 1840 to Thomas St Lawrence, 3rd Earl of Howth, and his wife, Lady Emily de Burgh, who was the daughter of the John de Burgh, 13th Earl of Clanricarde. Lady Emily died of measles in 1842 in Dublin.

Lady Margaret was raised a Protestant but converted to Catholicism. She was a regular contributor to periodicals and magazines, and wrote two books. She wrote predominantly about history and religion.

She married Sir Charles Compton William Domvile, 2nd Baronet Domvile, of Templeogue and Santry, on 20 June 1861. The couple had no children and were the last of the Domville family to live in Santry estate. Sir Charles died on 10 July 1884.

== Works ==
=== Articles ===
- "A Visit to the Hareem of Saïd Pacha", Once a Week magazine, 1862
- "Sicilian Notes", Once a Week magazine, 1863
- "Eucharistic Adaptations of Holy Scripture: The Pharisee and the Publican" in The Irish Monthly, I (1873), pp. 39–40

=== Books ===
- A Life of Lamartine (1888)
- The King's Mother: Memoirs of Margaret Beaufort, Countess of Richmond and Derby (1899)
