= Henry Barry, 4th Baron Barry of Santry =

Irish peer

Henry Barry, 4th Baron Barry of Santry (1710–1751), often referred to simply as Lord Santry, was an Irish peer, who was a notorious rake. He is unique in being the only member of the Irish House of Lords to be convicted of murder by his peers, for which crime he was sentenced to death. He later received a full pardon for the murder but died abroad when he was still a young man.

== Biography ==
He was born in Dublin on 3 September 1710, the only son of Henry Barry, 3rd Baron Barry of Santry, and Bridget Domvile, daughter of Sir Thomas Domvile, 1st Baronet, of Templeogue, and his first wife (and cousin) Elizabeth Lake, daughter of Sir Lancelot Lake. He succeeded to the title in 1735 and took his seat in the Irish House of Lords. He married firstly Anne Thornton, daughter of William Thornton of Finglas, who died in 1742, and secondly, in 1750 Elizabeth Shore of Derby, but had no issue by either marriage. He died in Nottingham on 22 March 1751 and was buried at St. Nicholas' Church, Nottingham.

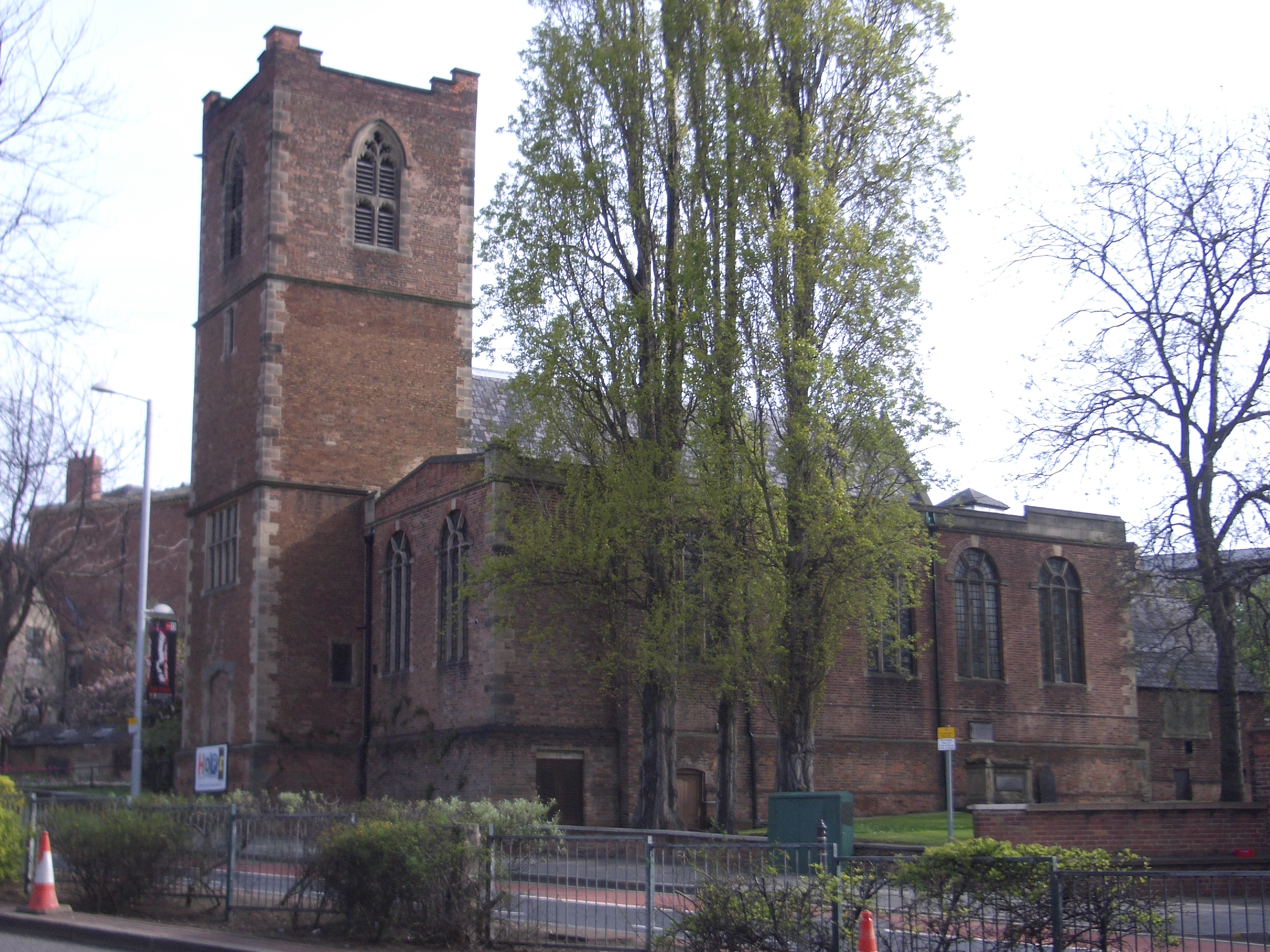
St. Nicholas' Church, Nottingham, where Lord Santry is buried

== Murder of Laughlin Murphy ==
Lord Barry of Santry seems to have been an extreme example of an eighteenth-century rake, a man of quarrelsome and violent nature, and a heavy drinker. He was a member of the notorious Dublin Hellfire Club: it is said that the club's reputation never fully recovered from the sensational publicity surrounding his trial for murder, although there is no reason to think that any of his fellow members knew of or condoned the crime. There were widespread rumours that he had committed at least one previous murder which was successfully hushed up, although there seems to be no firm evidence for this.

On 9 August 1738, Lord Santry (as he was usually known) was drinking with some friends at a tavern in Palmerstown, which is now a suburb but was then a small village near Dublin city. Santry, who had drunk even more heavily than usual, attacked a drinking companion, Mr Humphries, but was unable to draw his sword. Enraged, he ran to the kitchen, where he chanced to meet Laughlin Murphy, the tavern porter, and for no known reason ran him through with his sword. Santry then bribed the innkeeper to let him escape. Murphy was taken to Dublin where he lingered for some weeks; he died on 25 September 1738.

=== Trial ===
Although Lord Santry was not immediately apprehended, there is no reason to think that the Crown intended that he should escape justice; indeed the authorities clearly aimed not only to prosecute him but to secure a conviction. Even in an age when the aristocracy enjoyed special privileges, the murder of Murphy, who by all accounts was an honest and hardworking man with a wife and young family to support, had shocked public opinion, whereas Lord Santry was regarded, even among members of his own class, as a public nuisance. In due course, Santry was arrested and indicted for murder. He demanded, as the privilege of peerage, a trial by his peers. The trial, which took place in the Irish Houses of Parliament on 27 April 1739, aroused immense public interest.

Lord Wyndham, the Lord Chancellor of Ireland, presided in his office Lord High Steward of Ireland, with 23 peers sitting as judges. The Attorney-General for Ireland, Robert Jocelyn, and the Solicitor-General for Ireland, John Bowes, led for the prosecution.

Bowes dominated the proceedings and his speeches made his reputation as an orator. Thomas Rundle, Bishop of Derry, who as a Lords Spiritual was only an observer at the trial, said "I never heard, never read, so perfect a piece of eloquence...the strength and light of his reason, the fairness and candour". The Bishop was scathing about the quality of counsel for the defence, describing the performance of Santry's counsel as "detestable". The defence case was that Murphy had died not from his wound but from a long-standing illness (or alternatively a rat bite), but in view of the medical evidence produced by the prosecution this was a hopeless argument. According to Bishop Rundle, Santry's counsel failed even to mention the possibility that Murphy, who lingered for 6 weeks after being stabbed, might have died through inadequate medical care. Given the overwhelming evidence of Lord Santry's guilt, however, any defence would probably have been useless, and despite what was described as their "looks of horror", his peers had little difficulty in finding Santry guilty. Wyndham, who had conducted the trial with exemplary fairness, pronounced the death sentence. His retirement soon afterwards was generally thought to be due to the strain of the trial.

== Aftermath ==
King George II, like all British monarchs, had the prerogative of mercy, and a campaign was launched by Santry's friends and relatives to persuade the King to grant a pardon. Their plea concentrated on the victim's low social standing, the implication being that the life of a peer was worth more than that of a tavern worker, despite the victim's blameless character and the savage and wanton nature of the murder. The King proved reluctant to grant a pardon, and for a time it seemed that Santry must die, but in due course, a reprieve was issued. Popular legend had it that his uncle Sir Compton Domvile, through whose estate at Templeogue the River Dodder flowed, secured a royal pardon for his nephew by threatening to divert the course of the river, thus depriving the citizens of Dublin of what was then, and remained long after, their main supply of drinking water.

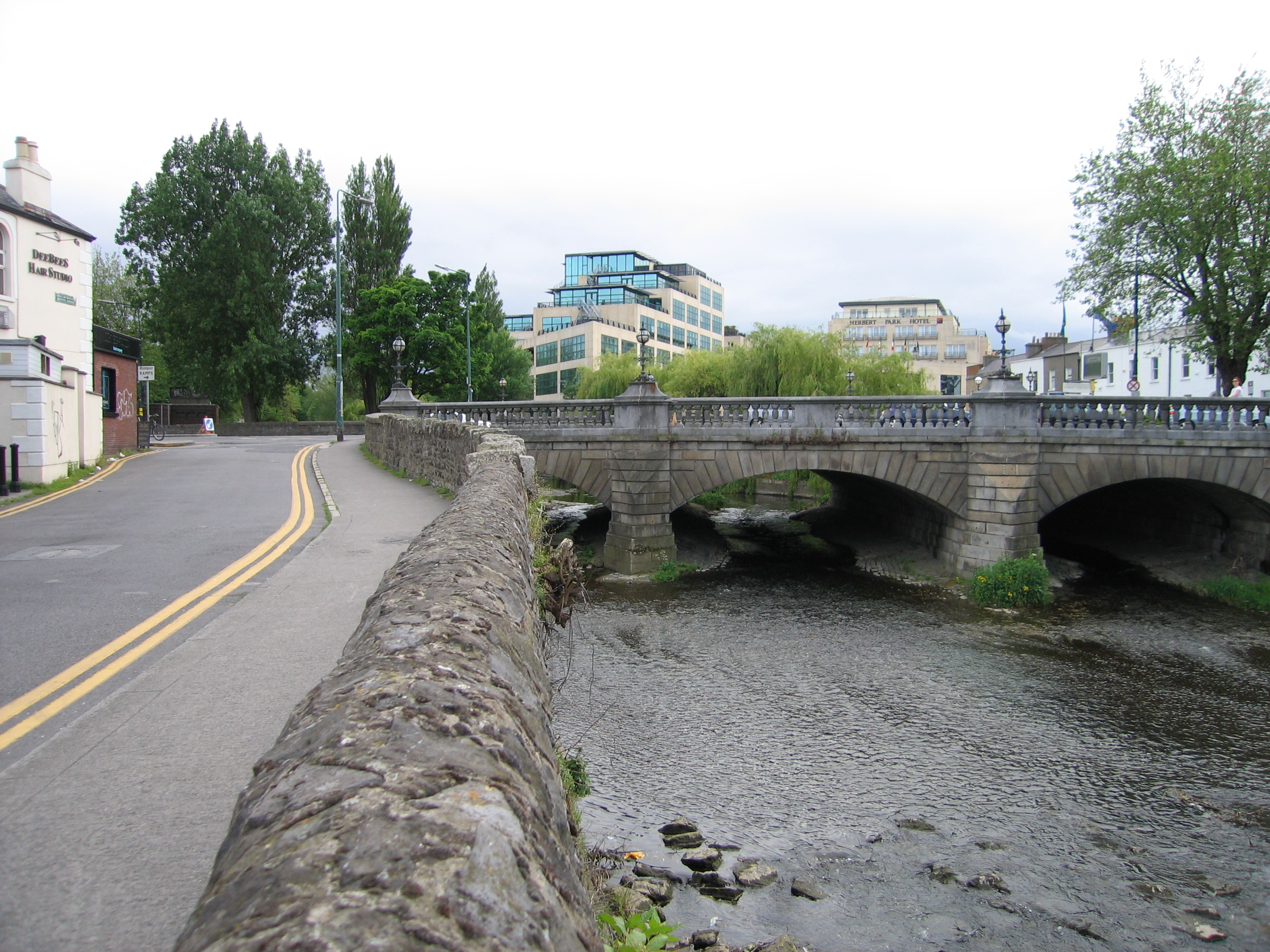
River Dodder today

On 17 June 1740, Lord Santry received a full royal pardon and the restoration of his title and estates; soon afterwards he left Ireland for good and settled in England. He is said to have had a personal audience with the King and thanked him in person for his clemency.

== Last years ==
His last years are said to have been wretched: although he had a second marriage shortly before his death, he was abandoned by all his former friends, was in great pain from gout, and was prone to depression. On his death in 1751 the title became extinct; his estates passed to his cousin, Sir Compton Domvile, 2nd Baronet, who made unsuccessful efforts to have the barony revived. His widow Elizabeth outlived him by many years, dying in December 1816.

== Parallel cases ==
In 1628 Lord Dunboyne was tried by his peers for manslaughter but acquitted. In 1743 The 5th Viscount Netterville was acquitted of murder by his peers, as was Robert King, 2nd Earl of Kingston in 1798.

Peerage of Ireland
| Preceded by Henry Barry | Baron Barry of Santry; 1734–1751 | Extinct |
