= Ballinakill =

Village in County Laois, Ireland

Ballinakill Baile na Coille
- Village
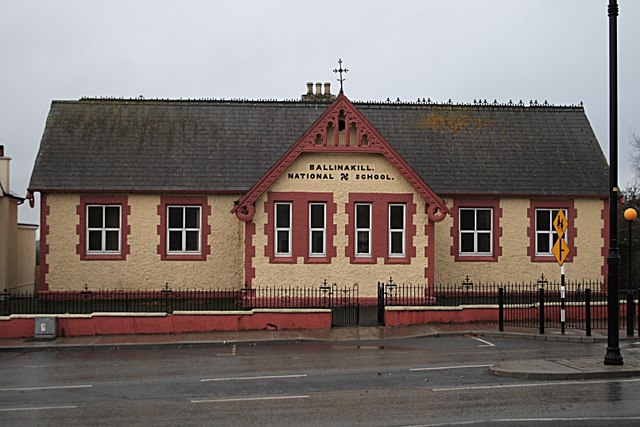
- Ballinakill National School

- Location in Ireland
- Coordinates: 52°52′27″N 7°18′36″W
- Country: Ireland
- Province: Leinster
- County: County Laois

Population (2016)
  - Total: 445
- Time zone: UTC+0 (WET)
  - Summer (DST): UTC-1 (IST (WEST))

Ballinakill (Irish: Baile na Coille, meaning 'the town of the woods') is a small village in County Laois, Ireland on the R432 regional road between Abbeyleix, Ballyragget and Castlecomer, County Kilkenny. As of the 2016 census, there were 445 people living in Ballinakill.

== History ==
In 1606, Sir Thomas Coatch was granted the right to hold a market and fair in the village. The Ballinakill Cattle Fair continued until 1963. In 1611, Ballinakill was acquired by Sir Thomas Ridgeway who invested heavily by building a castle and developing the local area. From 1613 until the Acts of Union, the town was a parliamentary borough, electing two members to the Irish House of Commons.

The town was besieged and plundered by Irish rebels, including the Earl of Castlehaven and Lord Mountgarret, during the 1641 Rebellion. When the castle and town surrendered much was robbed, including cattle, sheep and cloth. Remarkably, this information survives to us through an account from a native American Patagonian from present day southern Argentina/Chile 'but now a Christian' who had been a servant to Captain Richard Steele for twenty years and lived in Ballinakill.

== Landmarks ==
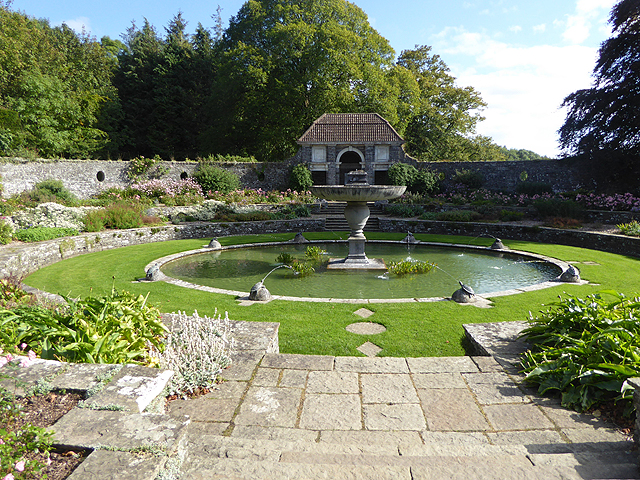
The gardens of the Heywood Estate lie just north of Ballinakill

The town square features a monument to men who died in the 1798 rebellion. The monument was erected in 1898. In 1998 a ceremony was held in Ballinakill to mark the bicentenary of the deaths.

Heywood House Gardens, located just north of Ballinakill, is a formal garden on the former Heywood Estate which was designed by Edwin Lutyens and Gertrude Jekyll in the early 20th century. The gardens are now managed by the Office of Public Works and open to the public.

== Sport ==
Ballinakill GAA and Spink GAA are local Gaelic Athletic Association clubs.

== Transport ==
A daily Town Link service, operated by Slieve Bloom Coaches, routes through the village between Portlaoise and Borris-in-Ossory. There is also a daily TFI Local Link service, route 822, from Mountrath to Carlow.

== Recreation ==
Ballinakill has an outdoor swimming pool which is operated seasonally from June to September, Masslough lake on the edge of the village, and a playground which opened in 2022.

== See also ==
- List of towns and villages in Ireland
- Oliver Grace
