= John Jackson (archdeacon of Clogher) =

Archdeacon of Clogher (1712–1787)

The Ven. John Jackson D.D. (1712-1787) was Archdeacon of Clogher from 1762 until 1783.

Jackson was born in Dublin in 1712, the son of Rev. John Jackson (1688-1751), Vicar of Santry, and his wife Anne Castletown (the daughter of Alderman Castletown, of Finglas) and educated at Trinity College there.

His father (also John) and grandfather (Rev. Daniel Jackson) had both been the incumbent at Santry, living at the Queen Anne styled, Woodlands House built by his father in 1735, his father is mentioned in the will of Dean Swift.
