= Santry =

Suburb of Dublin, Ireland

Santry Seantrabh (Irish)
- Suburb
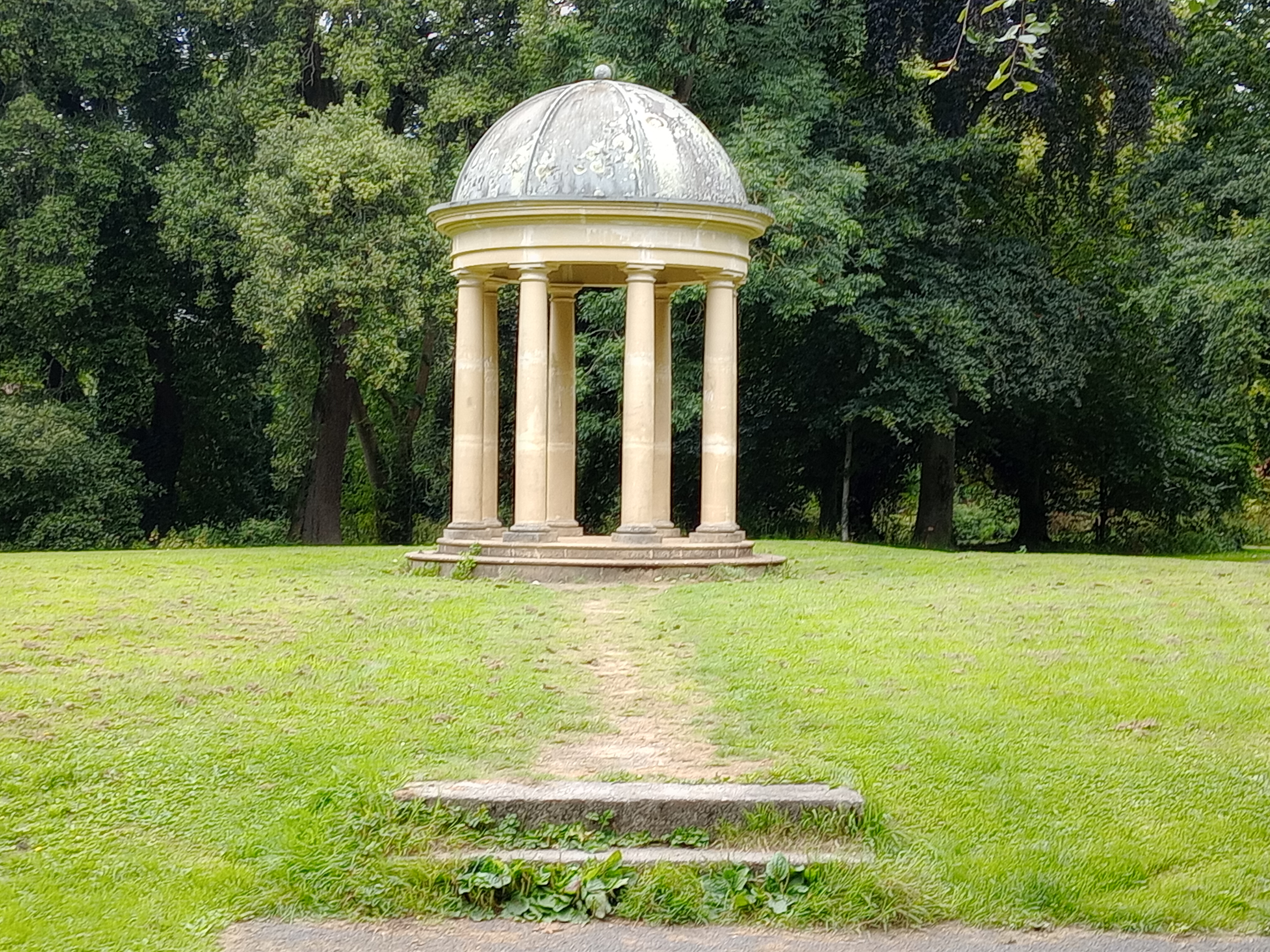
- Folly in Santry Demesne

- Location within Dublin
- Coordinates: 53°23′56″N 6°14′49″W
- Country: Ireland
- Province: Leinster
- Local government area: Dublin City Council, Fingal County Council
- County (traditional): County Dublin
- Eircode routing key: D09

Santry (Irish: Seantrabh, meaning 'old tribe') is a suburb on the northside of Dublin, Ireland, bordering Coolock, Glasnevin, Kilmore and Ballymun. It straddles the boundary of Dublin City Council and Fingal County Council jurisdictions.

The repository of Trinity College Library, which holds three million books, is in Santry, along with Morton Stadium athletics facility.

Santry is also the name of a civil parish in the ancient barony of Coolock.

== History ==
Santry is an anglicisation of the Irish placename Seantrabh (IPA: [ˈʃanˠt̪ˠɾˠaw], approximately SHAN-trav) meaning "old tribe" with the name referenced as far back as 828 AD. The National Museum of Ireland holds flint artifacts from Santry from the Stone Age. The Great Book of Lecan refers to a tribe called the Almanii who inhabited the area, which may have been the source of the name. St Pappin founded a monastery in Santry in the sixth century, on the site of the present-day Protestant church, St. Pappan's Church. This monastic settlement was later raided during the Viking invasions.

After this time, people began to refer to the area north of the River Tolka, including from Santry and north to Swords, Lusk, and beyond as "Fingal", which translates as "fair-haired foreigner". The name was confined to songs, poems, folk memory and some antiquarian titles until a re-organisation of local government in the 1990s set up Fingal and Fingal County Council.

In the 12th century, the neighbourhood of Santry was at the hands of Mac Gilla Mocholmog, chief of Fingal, who then established his base in Santry. About 1170, Hugh de Lacy, Lord of Meath granted Santry to one of his most trusted lieutenants, Adam de Feypo.

In 1581, the lands and title of Santry were awarded to William Nugent who then lost it after falling out of favour with the Crown because of his religion. In 1620, the lands of Santry were confiscated from Nugent's aristocratic but Catholic offspring, the Barnewalls. The Protestant Barry family (originally from Cork) took charge of the estate and tenants and became the Lords of Santry where they remained in title for three or four generations. Charles II granted Sir James Barry the title of Baron Barry of Santry for services rendered.

Santry was the scene of violence in the early months of the Irish Rebellion of 1641, when a punitive expedition of Parliamentarians led by Sir Charles Coote mistakenly massacred a group of local farm labourers, who were sleeping in the fields there. Coote had assumed they were rebels preparing to attack Dublin. In the mid-1700s, the area was known for the activity of highwaymen who could escape and hide in Santry woods.

In the Irish Rebellion of 1798, United Irishmen from all over Fingal marched south towards Dublin city but were met by a company of local yeomanry (government militia) from Santry village and were massacred. The bloodshed was so bad in this action that the area at the northern gateway to Santry Demesne became known as "Bloody Hollows". A Royal Irish Constabulary station was later located on the site. It is now a restaurant.

== Features ==
=== Santry Demesne (Santry Court) ===
Santry Court (also referred to as Santry Park or Santry Woods) is a demesne situated within Santry, in the administration of Fingal County Council and adjacent to Morton Stadium, the national athletics stadium. It contains a walled garden, a lake, monuments and has the Santry River going through it. The stadium was the venue for the European Cross Country Championships in 2009.

Where the new Santry Demesne public park is situated, on part of the estate lands, was once a palatial old house and gardens, built in the 18th century. This was once the largest house in north County Dublin and people travelled from far and wide to be received by the owners, the Barry family. A number of hints of the house still exist in the park, including the house foundations, front steps, tree avenue and walled garden. A small bend in the Santry River (which forms the boundary of the park today) was widened to create a small boating pond.

In 1912, King Victor Emmanuel of Italy presented the Barrys/Domvilles with a gift of 16 foreign tree species. The house fell into disrepair, initially at the turn of the 20th century as the estate proved not to be economically viable but ultimately after the Domville family departed Ireland post-independence in 1921. It came into the possession of the Irish state, which intended to repair it and use it as a mental asylum. This plan was shelved by the start of World War II; the need to increase security around Dublin Airport meant it was used as an army depot, and part of the gardens as a firing range. While being used by the Irish army the house was severely damaged by a fire in 1947, followed by demolition in 1959.

In 1972, part of the demesne was sold to Trinity College Dublin, and was developed with sports grounds, as well as a book storage facility for its library system.

As of 2010, the walled garden had been leased to a community group to run as a community garden; the 4-acre plot was divided into three sections: an ornamental section, heritage and kitchen garden. Several varieties of plants, vegetables and fruit are grown by volunteers in the garden. Since 2013, there has also been a bee apiary.

A number of tree species in Santry include native trees such as oak, ash, beech and rowan, as well as Californian redwood (Sequoias), Horse chestnut, Sweet chestnut, Evergreen Oak, and Ginkgo.

==== Santry family ====
The house was built by the 3rd Lord Barry of Santry in 1703. Steps and wings were added by Henry Barry, 4th Baron Barry of Santry 1740–50, who was a member of the Hell Fire Club, and was convicted of the murder of a porter at an inn in Palmerstown in 1739. He received the death penalty but was reprieved and lost his title. After the death of Lord Barry of Santry in 1751, the estate was inherited by his uncle Sir Compton Domvile, 2nd Baronet. It remained with the Domvile family until the death in 1935 of Sir Compton Meade Domvile, 4th Baronet, when the estate passed to his nephew Sir Hugo Poë, who assumed the surname Domvile.

=== Swiss Cottages ===
A number of Swiss Cottages, still sometimes associated in memory with Santry, are largely no longer extant. The cottages were built in 1840 by Lady Domville who, after a visit to Switzerland, decided to build eleven Swiss-style cottages for the farm workers and estate staff. Each of the cottages were named for a tree or a shrub, such as Lilac Cottage. Ten of the eleven cottages were later demolished due to their dilapidation. While the last remaining cottage still stands in Santry, Verbena Cottage, with the building was adapted into an office block in 1984. Morton Stadium now stands on the site of what were the gardens at the rear of the house. The only contemporary reminder of the Swiss Cottages is found in the name of a local pub, 'The Swiss Cottage'. This pub was demolished in 2019, and work commenced on a new apartment complex on the site.

=== Santry-Ballymun Charter School (Santry Lodge) ===
Originally built as a mill c. 1700, on the Santry River to the northwest of Santry Demesne, the Santry Charter School was established in 1744 by the Incorporated Society for Promoting English Protestant Schools in Ireland. Supported by Dublin Corporation, it was built on land sourced from Luke Gardiner, with a house provided by Archbishop Hugh Boulter. The school closed in 1840, and the building was renamed 'Santry Lodge'.

== Housing ==
Much of modern Santry is made up of housing estates, which are a mixture of private and social housing, with most estates being made up of the former. Reflecting the area's roots, many of their names start with 'Shan', such as Shanliss, Shanowen, Shanglas, Shanboley, Shanvarna and Shangan (the latter having been encroached upon by the growing area of neighbouring Ballymun during its redevelopment). There are also estates such as Magenta, Lorcan, as well as developments such as Aulden Grange, Woodlawn, Oak, Larkhill, Knightswood and the apartment complexes of Northwood.

=== Larkhill ===
==== Dublin Corporation Housing Scheme ====
In the 1930s, the citizens housing council released two reports that demonstrated the extent of housing issues within the capital, and Dublin Corporation were aware that Dublin's slums were not being cleared as rapidly as they wished. In 1938, Dr Hernon, the city manager, disclosed a five-year plan that would result in an additional 12,000 dwellings built at a cost of about £7.5m. This was said to be roughly half of what had been suggested by the citizens housing council but it was believed that it was an enthusiastic target. The corporation came to the conclusion that 17,000 families needed to be relocated. The foundation of the five-year plan was the assumption that 12,000 dwellings was the maximum that could be accomplished with the resources available, and in the city manager's judgment, it was impractical to commit to committing to 5,000 dwellings each year as indicated by the citizens housing council.

There were only a few smaller settlement clusters where development had already begun in places such as Larkhill, which would eventually grow into significant suburbs. The first phase of a housing programme for 1,500 homes over a five-year period was proposed, with construction beginning at Cabra West, Rutland Avenue, Donnycarney, Sarsfield Road, Crumlin, Ellenfield, Larkhill and Terenure. Additional homes would be constructed to these, and schools, shops, churches, libraries, and other amenities would be made available. A £7 million total budget was planned. These ideas were believed to have a significant impact on the city but there was no overarching plan in place. There was no clear vision for the city and no idea of the ideal type of urban setting. There were no agents of development other than the corporation, and no system was proposed to mediate the complicated connection between public and private actors. By 1943, Dublin corporation had only created a 'sketch' plan as required by the 1934 law.

==== Larkhill Housing Scheme ====
The Larkhill scheme was an addition to the ongoing Ellenfield project. Both were near the upcoming Associated Properties' Wadelai development. A total of 537 homes were to be constructed in Larkhill. The total number of dwellings built in Larkhill, which was completed 1939, was slightly higher than anticipated. Larkhill construction was relatively modest, and an independent development with access to the major thoroughfare, but local circulation was controlled to lessen through-traffic. The houses that were built were a mixture of short terraces with different lengths.

Within the Larkhill development, at Larkhill Road, the layout was somewhat oblong and tear-shaped. At the peak of the Larkhill project along Glendun Road, a semicircular park was created. It was also intended to add to the construction that had already been done along Larkhill and Ellenfield.

== Amenities ==
Trinity College Library has a depository at Santry which holds three million books. Santry is also the name of a civil parish in the ancient barony of Coolock.

=== Retail and services ===
Besides several local shops, Santry contains a substantial retail facility, the 'Omni Park Shopping Centre', which also features a cinema, IMC Santry (previously called the Omniplex Cinema), and several restaurants. There is also a retail park in Northwood, Gulliver's In addition, Santry is home to the Crowne Plaza hotel, several restaurants, multiple gymnasiums, a track and field stadium, several medical facilities, a go-karting/paint-balling arena, a bank, an industrial estate, a skate park, several B&B's, several pubs, an outdoor 'Astro' soccer stadium and local primary and secondary schools. Santry is close to Dublin Airport. The Santry Sports Clinic is located in Santry Demesne.

=== Education ===
Santry is served by Holy Child National School (infant class boys, girls to 6th class) and Holy Child Boys National School in Larkhill, and Gaelscoil Cholmcille, and for second level: Margaret Aylward School, Whitehall House, St. Aidan's C.B.S., Plunket College and Clonturk Community College. Our Lady of Mercy College in Beaumont, Maryfield College, Rosmini, Dominican College Griffith Avenue and Trinity Comprehensive School in Ballymun would also serve some of the population of Santry.

=== Religion ===
Santry is part of the Whitehall-Larkhill-Santry Roman Catholic parish, served by the Church of the Holy Child, opened in 1944, and by Blessed Margaret Ball church opened in 1994 (named after one of the Dublin Martyrs). The Church of Ireland community are served by St. Pappan's Church, which is part of the Santry, Glasnevin (St. Mobhi's) and Finglas (St. Canice's) Grouping of Parishes, in Santry village (the former St. Pappin's or St. Pappan's Catholic church was just off Santry Avenue in Ballymun, built in 1846 during the famine times. Workers were paid in food and the land was provided by the Domville family of Santry Woods; it is now a nursing home. This had replaced an earlier St. Pappan's Catholic church on Santry Avenue built in 1797). There is an old graveyard beside St. Pappan's and a parish hall. While Blessed Margaret's (a chapel of ease for Whitehall church) was being developed, the St. Pappan's Parish Hall was used by the Catholic community for weekly mass. At one point, St. Pappan's Catholic Church in Ballymun, shared seats with St. Pappan's Church of Ireland, and they moved the seats between the churches between services.

A later development is the Dublin Christian Life Church, in Schoolhouse Lane, a Chinese Christian community. Another new church is the Christian Fellowship Church, off Coolock Lane.

== Sports ==
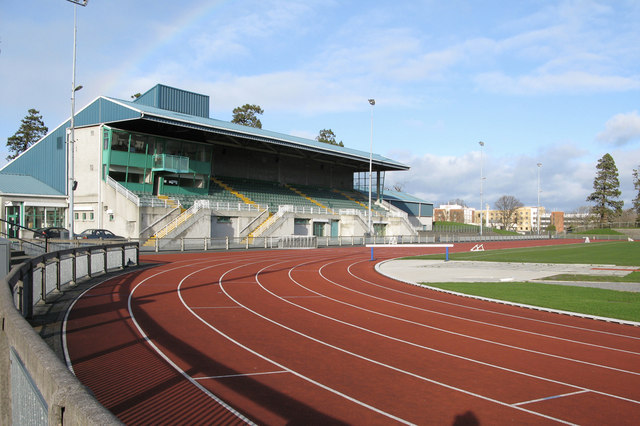
Morton Stadium

=== Soccer ===
Santry is the base of a number of sports clubs such as the association football clubs St. Kevin's Boys Club established in 1959 who play in Shanowen Road, Ellenfield park, Albert College park, Coolgreena and off the Old Airport Road and Lorcan Celtic established in 1987 who play in Lorcan Green. Sporting Fingal F.C. played their home games at the Morton Stadium during their three seasons in the League of Ireland, from 2008 to 2011 when they disbanded.

=== Greyhound racing and speedway ===
Greyhound racing and speedway took place at the Santry Sports Stadium (not to be confused with the Morton Stadium.) The greyhound racing was operational from August 1945 until 1951 and the speedway operated from 1948 until 1951.

=== Other sports ===
Trinity College has sports grounds on a former part of the Santry Demesne off Santry Avenue; this includes facilities for rugby, soccer, Gaelic football, hurling and hockey pitches.

Clonliffe Harriers Athletic Club is based in the Morton Stadium in Santry, which they built in 1955.

=== Community groups ===
The Santry Forum, based in the Santry Community Resource Centre, off Coolock Lane, represents residents in the Santry and Whitehall area.

== Industrial estates ==
Santry has long been the location of a number of businesses and industries, from Chrysler and the Talbot factory on Shanowen Road (which became the Garda Station), to IT companies and logistic service providers associated with nearby Dublin Airport. Businesses based here include Kellogg's. Industrial estates and business parks in the area include Airways Industrial Estate, Furry Park Industrial Estate, Santry Hall Industrial Estate, Shanowen Road Business Park, St John's Court Office Park and Woodford Business Park.

== Transport ==
Public transport comprises a number of bus routes, operated by Dublin Bus and Go-Ahead Ireland These include route number 16 (from Ballinteer to Dublin Airport) and 27b (from Harristown to Eden Quay, turning away from Santry at the Santry Demesne junction). Night buses serving the area include the N4 (from The Point to Blanchardstown via Collins Ave) and N6 (from Finglas to Kilbarrack).

Other services include routes 33, 41, 41b and 41c (all serving Lower Abbey Street in Dublin city centre) and route 104 (from Clontarf Road to DCU).

== Notable people ==
- David Brophy, Conductor
- Noel Rock, Former TD
- Míne Bean Uí Chribín, a conservative religious and language activist

== See also ==
- List of towns and villages in Ireland
