= Domville baronets =

Extinct baronetcy in the Baronetage of the United Kingdom

The Domville Baronetcy, of St Alban's in the County of Hertford, was a title in the Baronetage of the United Kingdom. It was created on 28 July 1814 for William Domville, Lord Mayor of London from 1813 to 1814. He was a descendant of William Domville, elder brother of Gilbert Domvile, ancestor of the Domvile baronets of Tempoleogue. The title became extinct on the death of the seventh Baronet in 1981.

== Domville baronets, of St Alban's (1814) ==
- Sir William Domville, 1st Baronet (1742–1833)
- Sir William Domville, 2nd Baronet (1774–1860)
- Sir James Graham Domville, 3rd Baronet (1812–1887)
- Sir William Cecil Henry Domville, 4th Baronet (1849–1904)
- Sir James Henry Domville, 5th Baronet (1889–1919)
- Sir Cecil Lionel Domville, 6th Baronet (1892–1930)
- Sir Gerald Guy Domville, 7th Baronet (1896–1981). He left no heir.

== See also ==
- Domvile baronets

Baronetage of the United Kingdom
Preceded by Wylie baronets	Domville baronets of St Alban's; 28 July 1814	Succeeded by Grey baronets
