= Poë-Domvile baronets =

Extinct baronetcy in the Baronetage of the United Kingdom

- Coat of arms of the Poë-Domvile baronets (1936 grant)
- Creation date: 1912
- Status: extinct
- Extinction date: 1959
- Motto: Ung Durant ma vie, The same while I live
- Arms: Quarterly, 1st and 4th: Azure, a lion rampant Argent, collard Gules (Domvile); 2nd and 3rd: Or, a fesse between three crescents Azure issuing flames Proper (Poë).
- Crest: A lion's head erased Argent, ducally crowned Or (Domvile).

The Poë, later Poë-Domvile baronetcy, of Heywood in the Parish of Ballinakill in Queen's County, was a title in the Baronetage of the United Kingdom. It was created on 2 July 1912 for Hutcheson Poë, an Irish landowner and participant in the Land Conference of 1902.

The 1st Baronet was subsequently Lord Lieutenant of Queen's County (1920–22) and a Senator of the Irish Free State (1922–24). He married Mary Adelaide, only surviving daughter of Sir William Compton Domvile, 3rd Baronet (see Domvile baronets (1815 creation)). Through this marriage Heywood House came into the Poë family.

== 2nd Baronet ==
Hugo Compton Domvile Poë, only son of the 1st Baronet, was declared of unsound mind on 10 May 1929. On his father's death, he inherited the baronetcy. On his mother's death, he became eligible to inherit lands in Dublin, on condition that he adopt the surname and arms of Domvile. As there were doubts about whether this could be done for a person of unsound mind, a private act of the Oireachtas was passed on 3 April 1936 to change his name to Hugo Compton Domvile Poë Domvile and his arms to quartering of the Poë and Domvile arms.

The title became extinct on the 2nd Baronet's death in 1959.

== Poë, later Poë-Domvile Baronets, of Heywood (1912) ==
- Sir (William) Hutcheson Poë, 1st Baronet (1848 – 30 November 1934)
- Sir Hugo Compton Domvile Domvile-Poë, 2nd Baronet (1889–1959)

Poë baronets
- Adopted: 1912
- Relinquished: 1936
- Crest: A boar's head erect couped Or pierced with a broken spear proper.
- Torse: or and azure
- Shield: Or a fesse between three crescents Azure issuing flames proper.
- Motto: Malo Mori Quam Foedari
- The original coat of arms

Baronetage of the United Kingdom
Preceded by Albu baronets	Poë baronets of Heywood; 2 July 1912	Succeeded by Beale baronets
