= Domvile baronets (1815 creation) =

Extinct baronetcy in the Baronetage of the United Kingdom

The Domvile Baronetcy, of Templeogue and Santry House in the County of Dublin, was created in the Baronetage of the United Kingdom on 22 May 1815 for Compton Domvile, subsequently Member of Parliament for Bossiney, Okehampton and Plympton Erle. He was the son of Charles Pocklington, nephew and heir of the second and last Domvile baronet of the 1686 creation. Charles Pocklington had assumed by royal licence the surname of Domvile in lieu of Pocklington in 1768 on succeeding to the estates of his uncle. The title became extinct on the death of the 4th Baronet in 1935.

== Domvile baronets, of Templeogue and Santry (1815) ==
- Sir Compton Pocklington Domvile, 1st Baronet (c. 1775 – 23 February 1857)
- Sir Charles Compton William Domvile, 2nd Baronet (1822 – 10 July 1884) son of 1st baronet; married Lady Margaret St. Lawrence; no issue
- Sir William Compton Domvile, 3rd Baronet (1825 – 20 September 1884) son of 1st baronet; married Caroline Meade; one son and three daughters, including Mary Adelaide, later wife of Sir Hutcheson Poë, 1st Baronet
- Sir Compton Meade Domvile, 4th Baronet (1857 – 22 April 1935) son of the 3rd baronet; never married.

== See also ==
- Domvile baronets (1686 creation)
- Domville baronets
- Poë-Domvile baronets

Baronetage of the United Kingdom
Preceded by Clifford-Constable baronets	Domvile baronets of Templeogue and Santry; 22 May 1815	Succeeded by Dundas baronets
