= St John the Baptist Clontarf =

St John the Baptist Clontarf may refer to parishes and church buildings in the district of Clontarf, Dublin, Ireland:

- Clontarf parish (Church of Ireland)
  - The former Parish Church, near Clontarf Castle
  - The current Parish Church, at Seafield Road
- Clontarf parish (Roman Catholic)
- St John's parish, Clontarf (Roman Catholic), formed in 1966, when Contarf parish was divided
  - The Parish Churches thereof (see Clontarf parish (Roman Catholic))
    - The 1825 chapel
    - The current church, finished in the early 1840s
