= List of parishes in the Roman Catholic Archdiocese of Dublin =

The Archdiocese of Dublin is a Catholic archdiocese located in eastern Ireland, with a geographical remit comprising the city and traditional county of Dublin, most of County Wicklow and parts of counties Carlow, Kildare, Laois and Wexford.

== Structure ==
In 1975, the archdiocese comprised 163 parishes, but as of 2009, the number of parishes had risen to 200. One of these parishes is non-territorial, providing services to the Traveller community. The other 199 parishes had been grouped into sixteen deaneries since 2004, with pastoral responsibility for each of these deaneries resting with a number of auxiliary bishops or episcopal vicars. Each individual deanery is led by a vicar forane, whose responsibility it is to ease the administrative burden on the Archbishop.

Following the establishment of the Building Hope task force by Archbishop Dermot Farrell in April 2021, the parishes were restructured into 53 parish partnerships within fifteen deaneries, which were shared with parishes in the first week of Advent 2022.

Episcopal Vicar	Deanery	Parish Partnerships	Parishes
Canon Liam Rigney	Blessington	4	12
Canon Liam Rigney	South Dublin	2	11
Canon Liam Rigney	Tallaght	3	11
Fr. Richard Sheehy	Blanchardstown	3	9
Fr. Richard Sheehy	Fingal North	3	11
Fr. Richard Sheehy	Maynooth	4	18
Fr. Paul Thornton	Fingal South East	5	16
Fr. Paul Thornton	Fingal South West	4	13
Fr. Paul Thornton	Howth	3	14
Fr. Donal Roche	Bray	5	17
Fr. Donal Roche	Donnybrook	5	19
Fr. Donal Roche	Wicklow	3	10
Fr. Enda Cunningham	Cullenswood	3	12
Fr. Enda Cunningham	North City Centre	3	10
Fr. Enda Cunningham	South City Centre	3	11
Total Count (incl. Travelling People)	15	53	194

== Deaneries ==
=== Under the pastoral responsibility of Canon Liam Rigney ===
==== Blessington ====
The Blessington deanery is located in the civil county of South Dublin and the traditional counties of Carlow, Kildare, Laois and Wicklow.

The vicar forane is Fr. John Gilligan.

Parish Partnership	Parish	Churches and chapels of ease	Constituted	Other details
1	Athy	St Michael's, Athy; St Mary's, Barrowhouse (chapel of ease)	1670	Athy
1	Castledermot	Church of the Assumption, Castledermot; St Laurence O'Toole, Levitstown (chapel of ease)		Castledermot
1	Moone	Blessed Trinity, Moone	1974	Constituted from Castledermot; Moone
1	Narraghmore	Ss Mary and Laurence, Crookstown; St Joseph's, Ballymount (chapel of ease); St Ita's, Kilmead (chapel of ease)		Parish dates from at least 1650; Narraghmore
2	Blessington	Church of Our Lady, Blessington; Our Lady of Mercy Crosschapel, Blessington; St Brigid's, Manor Kilbride		Blessington
2	Eadestown	Immaculate Conception, Eadestown; St Laurence O'Toole, Kilteel (chapel of ease)	1884	Constituted from Blessington; Eadestown
2	Valleymount	St Joseph's, Valleymount; Our Lady of Mount Carmel, Lacken (chapel of ease)	1803	Valleymount
3	Ballymore Eustace	Immaculate Conception, Ballymore Eustace; St Kevin's, Hollywood (chapel of ease)		Constituted prior to 1779; Ballymore Eustace
3	Dunlavin	St Nicholas of Myra, Dunlavin; Holy Trinity, Donard (chapel of ease); Our Lady of Dolours and St Patrick, Davidstown (chapel of ease)		Dunlavin
3	Kilcullen	Sacred Heart and St Brigid, Kilcullen; St Joseph's, Gormanstown (chapel of ease)	1869	Constituted from New Abbey; Kilcullen
4	Newcastle	St Finian's, Newcastle Lyons	1974	Constituted from Saggart; Newcastle
4	Saggart	Nativity of Our Lady, Saggart; Holy Family, Rathcoole (chapel of ease)	1850	Saggart

==== South Dublin ====
The South Dublin deanery is located entirely within the eponymous civil county.

The vicar forane is Fr. Philip Bradley.

Parish Partnership	Parish	Churches and chapels of ease	Constituted	Other details
1	Ballyboden	Our Lady of Good Counsel, Ballyboden	1973	Constituted from Ballyroan, Bohernabreena-Firhouse and Rathfarnham; Ballyboden
1	Ballyroan	Holy Spirit, Ballyroan	1968	Constituted from Rathfarnham; Ballyroan
1	Churchtown	Good Shepherd, Churchtown	1965	Constituted from Rathfarnham; Churchtown
1	Knocklyon	St Colmcille's, Knocklyon	1974	Knocklyon
1	Marley Grange	Divine Word, Marley Grange	1981	Constituted from Churchtown; Marley Grange
1	Rathfarnham	Church of the Annunciation, Rathfarnham		Constituted pre-Reformation; Rathfarnham
2	Greenhills	Holy Spirit, Greenhills	1971	Greenhills
2	Kimmage Manor	Holy Spirit, Kimmage Manor	1990	Constituted from Crumlin and Greenhills; Kimmage Manor
2	Templeogue	St Pius X, Templeogue	1964	Constituted from Terenure; Templeogue
2	Terenure	St Joseph's, Terenure	1894	Constituted from Rathfarnham; Terenure
2	Willington	St Jude the Apostle, Willington	1975	Constituted from Templeogue; Willington

==== Tallaght ====
The Tallaght deanery is located entirely within the civil county of South Dublin.

The vicar forane is Fr. William O’Shaughnessy.

Parish Partnership	Parish	Churches and chapels of ease	Constituted	Other details
1	Brookfield	St Aidan's, Brookfield	1983	Constituted from Springfield; Brookfield
1	Jobstown	St Thomas the Apostle, Jobstown	1983	Constituted from Springfield; Jobstown
1	Killinarden	Sacred Heart, Killinarden	1977	Constituted from Springfield; Killinarden
1	Springfield	St Mark's, Springfield; Church of the Incarnation, Fettercairn (chapel of ease)	1972	Constituted from Tallaght-Bohernabreena; Springfield
2	Kilnamanagh-Castleview	St Kilian's, Kingswood; St Kevin's, Kilnamanagh	2008	Constituted from Kilnamanagh and Castleview; Kilnamanagh-Castleview
2	Tallaght (St Aengus)	St Aengus, Tallaght	1985	Constituted from Tallaght (St Mary's); Tallaght (St Aengus)
2	Tallaght (St Dominic's)	St Dominic's, Tallaght	1985	Constituted from Tallaght (St Mary's); Tallaght (St Dominic's)
2	Tallaght (St Mary's)	St Mary's, Tallaght	1972	Tallaght (St Mary's)
3	Bohernabreena	St Anne's, Bohernabreena; Holy Rosary, Oldcourt (chapel of ease)	1868; 2009	Bohernabreena
3	Firhouse	Our Lady of Mount Carmel, Firhouse	1975	Firhouse
3	Tallaght (St Martin de Porres)	St Martin de Porres, Old Bawn	1985	Tallaght (St Martin's)

=== Under the pastoral responsibility of Fr. Richard Sheehy ===
==== Blanchardstown ====
The Blanchardstown deanery is located entirely within the civil county of Fingal.

The vicar forane is Fr. Damian McNeice.

Parish Partnership	Parish	Churches and chapels of ease	Constituted	Other details
1	Mountview (Note: The parish church in Blakestown, Mary of the Servants, closed in January 2018 due to the identification of structural issues with the church building.)	St Philip the Apostle, Mountview	2018	Constituted from Mountview and Blakestown; Mountview
1	Hartstown	St Ciarán's, Hartstown	1979	Constituted from Blanchardstown; Hartstown
1	Huntstown	Sacred Heart of Jesus, Huntstown; Mary, Mother of Hope, Littlepace (chapel of ease)	1981; 2002	Constituted from Blakestown; Huntstown
2	Blanchardstown	St Brigid's, Blanchardstown	1837	Mother church of the deanery Blanchardstown
2	Corduff	St Patrick's, Corduff	1976	Constituted from Blanchardstown; Corduff
2	Mulhuddart	St Luke the Evangelist, Mulhuddart	1993	Constituted from Blanchardstown; Mulhuddart
3	Castleknock	Our Lady, Mother of the Church, Castleknock	1976	Constituted from Blanchardstown; Castleknock
3	Laurel Lodge	St Thomas the Apostle, Laurel Lodge	1982	Constituted from Castleknock; Laurel Lodge
3	Porterstown-Clonsilla	St Mochta's, Porterstown	1986	Constituted from Castleknock; Porterstown-Clonsilla

==== Fingal North ====
The Fingal North deanery is located entirely within the civil county of Fingal.

The vicar forane is Canon John McNamara.

Parish Partnership	Parish	Churches and chapels of ease	Constituted	Other details
1	Brackenstown	St Cronan's, Brackenstown	1974	Constituted from Swords; Brackenstown
1	Donabate	St Patrick's, Donabate; The Immaculate Conception, Balheary (chapel of ease); St. Ita's Hospital Chapel, Portrane (chapel of ease)		Constituted from Donabate, Balheary and Portrane; Donabate
1	River Valley	St Finian's, River Valley	1982	Constituted from Swords; River Valley
1	Swords	St Colmcille's, Swords; Our Lady Queen of Heaven, Dublin Airport (chapel of ease); Church of the Visitation, Drynam (chapel of ease)	1608	Swords
2	Lusk	St MacCullin's, Lusk	1669	Lusk
2	Rush	St Maur's, Rush	1730	Constituted from Lusk; Rush
2	Skerries	St Patrick's, Skerries	1730	Constituted from Lusk; Skerries
3	Balbriggan	Ss Peter and Paul, Balbriggan; Church of the Assumption, Balscadden	1842; 1819	Balbriggan
3	Garristown	Church of the Assumption, Garristown; St Joseph's, Ballymadun (chapel of ease)		Garristown
3	Naul	St Canice's, Damastown; Nativity of Our Lady, Naul (chapel of ease); Assumption of Our Lady, Ballyboughal (chapel of ease)	1630	Naul
3	Rolestown	St Brigid's, Rolestown	1974	Constituted from Garristown; Rolestown

==== Maynooth ====
The Maynooth deanery is located in the civil county of South Dublin and the traditional county of Kildare.

The vicar forane is Fr. Kieran Coghlan.

Parish Partnership	Parish	Churches and chapels of ease	Constituted	Other details
1	Celbridge	St Patrick's, Celbridge; St Brigid's, Straffan (chapel of ease)	1859	Constituted from Maynooth; Celbridge
1	Confey	St Charles Borromeo, Confey	1984	Constituted from Leixlip; Confey
1	Leixlip	Our Lady's Nativity, Leixlip	1833	Constituted from Maynooth; Leixlip
1	Maynooth	St Mary's, Maynooth; Lady Chapel, Donaghstown (chapel of ease)	1615	Maynooth
2	Esker/Doddsboro/Adamstown	St Patrick's, Esker	1978	Constituted from Lucan; Esker/Doddsboro/Adamstown
2	Lucan	St Mary's, Lucan	1953	Constituted from Clondalkin; Lucan
2	Lucan South	Divine Mercy, Lucan South	1996	Constituted from Lucan; Lucan South
3	Bawnogue	Church of the Transfiguration, Bawnogue	1977	Constituted from Clondalkin; Bawnogue
3	Clondalkin	Immaculate Conception of the Blessed Virgin Mary and St Killian, Clondalkin; Our Lady, Queen of the Apostles, Clonburris (chapel of ease); Presentation of Our Lord in the Temple, Knockmitten (chapel of ease)	1615	Clondalkin
3	Deansrath	St Ronan's, Deansrath	1985	Constituted from Bawnogue; Deansrath
3	Sruleen	Sacred Heart, Sruleen	1990	Constituted from Clondalkin; Sruleen
4	Ballyfermot (Assumption)	Our Lady of the Assumption, Ballyfermot	1953	Constituted from Inchicore; Ballyfermot (Assumption)
4	Ballyfermot (St Matthew's)	St Matthew's, Ballyfermot	1972	Constituted from Ballyfermot (Assumption); Ballyfermot (St Matthew's)
4	Chapelizod	Nativity of the Blessed Virgin Mary, Chapelizod	1955	Constituted from Chapelizod and Clondalkin; Chapelizod
4	Cherry Orchard	Most Holy Sacrament, Cherry Orchard	1993	Constituted from Ballyfermot (Assumption); Cherry Orchard
4	Neilstown	St Peter the Apostle, Neilstown	1979	Constituted from Clondalkin; Neilstown
4	Palmerstown	St Philomena's, Palmerstown	1972	Constituted from Chapelizod; Palmerstown
4	Rowlagh	Immaculate Heart of Mary, Rowlagh	1979	Constituted from Clondalkin; Rowlagh

=== Under the pastoral responsibility of Fr. Paul Thornton ===
==== Fingal South East ====
The Fingal South East deanery is located within the city of Dublin and the civil county of Fingal.

The vicar forane is Fr. Michael O'Grady.

Parish Partnership	Parish	Churches and chapels of ease	Constituted	Other details
1	Clontarf (St Anthony's)	St Anthony's, Clontarf	1966	Constituted from Clontarf (St John's); Clontarf (St Anthony's)
1	Clontarf (St John's)	St John the Baptist, Clontarf	1942	Clontarf (St John's)
1	Dollymount	St Gabriel's, Dollymount	1966	Constituted from Clontarf (St John's); Dollymount
1	Killester	St Brigid's, Killester	1966	Constituted from Killester-Raheny; Killester
2	Donnycarney	Our Lady of Consolation, Donnycarney	1952	Constituted from Marino; Donnycarney
2	Fairview	Visitation of the Blessed Virgin Mary, Fairview	1855	Fairview
2	Marino	St Vincent de Paul, Marino	1942	Constituted from Fairview; Marino
3	Beaumont	Nativity of Our Lord, Beaumont	1977	Constituted from Donnycarney; Beaumont
3	Kilmore West	St Luke the Evangelist, Kilmore West	1972	Constituted from Ardlea; Kilmore West
3	Larkhill, Whitehall and Santry	Church of the Holy Child, Whitehall; Chapel of Blessed Margaret Ball, Santry (chapel of ease)	1944	Constituted from Glasnevin; Larkhill, Whitehall and Santry
4	Ardlea	St John Vianney, Ardlea	1965	Constituted from Coolock-Artane; Ardlea
4	Artane	Our Lady of Mercy, Artane	1968	Constituted from Coolock; Artane
4	Coolock	St Brendan's, Coolock	1969	Coolock
5	Bonnybrook	St Joseph the Artisan, Bonnybrook	1970	Constituted from Ardlea Road; Bonnybrook
5	Darndale	Our Lady Immaculate, Darndale	1972	Constituted from Coolock; Darndale
5	Priorswood	St Francis of Assisi, Priorswood	1974	Constituted from Bonnybrook; Priorswood

==== Fingal South West ====
The Fingal South West deanery is located within the city of Dublin and the civil county of Fingal.

The vicar forane is Fr. Frank Reburn.

Parish Partnership	Parish	Churches and chapels of ease	Constituted	Other details
1	Ballymun	St Joseph's, Balcurris; Virgin Mary, Ballymun; Holy Spirit, Silloge	2018	Constituted from Balcurris, Ballymun and Silloge; Ballymun
2	Ballygall	Our Mother of Divine Grace, Ballygall	1964	Constituted from Glasnevin; Ballygall
2	Ballymun Road	Our Lady of Victories, Glasnevin	1969	Constituted from Larkhill; Ballymun Road
2	Drumcondra	Corpus Christi, Drumcondra	1953	Constituted from Glasnevin; Drumcondra
2	Glasnevin	Our Lady of Dolours, Glasnevin	1912	Constituted from Fairview; Glasnevin
2	Iona Road	St Columba's, Glasnevin; St Alphonsus Monastery, Glasnevin (chapel of ease); Glasnevin Cemetery Chapel (chapel of ease)	1902	Constituted from Berkeley Road; Iona Road
3	Cabra	Christ the King, Cabra	1941	Constituted from Arran Quay; Cabra
3	Cabra West	Most Precious Blood, Cabra	1946	Constituted from Cabra and Aughrim Street; Cabra West
3	Navan Road	Our Lady Help of Christians, Cabra	1953	Constituted from Chapelizod; Navan Road
3	Phibsborough	St Peter's, Phibsborough	1974	Phibsborough
4	Finglas	St Canice's, Finglas; St Margaret's, St Margaret's (chapel of ease)	1920	Finglas
4	Finglas West	Church of the Annunciation, Finglas	1962	Constituted from Finglas; Finglas West
4	Rivermount	St Oliver Plunkett's, Rivermount; St Finian's Oratory, Rivermount (chapel of ease)	1974	Rivermount

==== Howth ====
The Howth deanery is located within the city of Dublin and the civil county of Fingal.

The vicar forane is Fr. Martin Noone.

Parish Partnership	Parish	Churches and chapels of ease	Constituted	Other details
1	Ayrfield	St Paul's, Ayrfield	1974	Constituted from Raheny; Ayrfield
1	Donaghmede	Holy Trinity, Donaghmede	1974	Constituted from Grange Park; Donaghmede
1	Edenmore	St Monica's, Edenmore	1966	Constituted from Coolock and Raheny; Edenmore
1	Grange Park	St Benedict's, Grange Park	1971	Constituted from Raheny; Grange Park
1	Raheny	Our Lady Mother of Divine Grace, Raheny	1966	Constituted from Killester-Raheny; Raheny
2	Baldoyle	Ss Peter and Paul, Baldoyle; St Laurence O'Toole, Baldoyle (chapel of ease)	1907	Constituted from Howth, Sutton and Baldoyle; Baldoyle
2	Bayside	Church of the Resurrection, Bayside	1971	Constituted from Baldoyle; Bayside
2	Howth	Church of the Assumption, Howth	7th century	Howth
2	Kilbarrack-Foxfield	St John the Evangelist, Kilbarrack	1971	Constituted from Bayside; Kilbarrack-Foxfield
2	Sutton	St Fintan's, Sutton	1969	Constituted from Howth; Sutton
3	Kinsealy	St Nicholas of Myra, Kinsealy	1972	Constituted from Baldoyle; Kinsealy
3	Malahide	St Sylvester's, Malahide	1941	Constituted from Swords; Malahide
3	Portmarnock	St Anne's, Portmarnock	1972	Constituted from Baldoyle; Portmarnock
3	Yellow Walls	Sacred Heart, Seabury	1996	Constituted from Malahide; Yellow Walls

=== Under the pastoral responsibility of Fr. Donal Roche ===
==== Bray ====
The Bray deanery is located within the civil county of Dún Laoghaire-Rathdown and the traditional county of Wicklow.

The vicar forane is Fr. Aquinas Duffy.

Parish Partnership	Parish	Churches and chapels of ease	Constituted	Other details
1	Sandyford	St Mary's, Sandyford; Our Lady of the Wayside, Kilternan (chapel of ease); St Patrick's, Glencullen (chapel of ease)	1829	Constituted from Cabinteely; Sandyford
2	Bray (Holy Redeemer)	Most Holy Redeemer, Bray	18th century	Holy Redeemer Church, Bray
2	Bray (Our Lady Queen of Peace)	Our Lady Queen of Peace, Bray	1954	Queen of Peace church, at the corner of Putland Road and Vevay Road, was built in 1946 on land donated by the Presentation Brothers of nearby Presentation College, Bray. Originally part of Bray (Holy Redeemer) parish, it was constituted as its own parish in 1954.
2	Bray (St Fergal's)	St Fergal's, Ballywaltrim	1976	Constituted from Bray (Our Lady Queen of Peace); Bray (St Fergal's)
2	Bray (St Peter's)	St Peter's, Little Bray	1975	Bray (St Peter's)
2	Enniskerry	St Mary's, Enniskerry; St Mochonog's, Kilmacanogue (chapel of ease)	1985	Constituted from Enniskerry and Kilmacanogue; Enniskerry
3	Ballybrack-Killiney	Ss Alphonsus and Columba, Ballybrack; St Stephen's, Killiney (chapel of ease); Church of the Apostles, Ballybrack (chapel of ease)	1863	Constituted from Dalkey; Ballybrack
3	Cabinteely (Note: Includes Cherrywood)	St Brigid's, Cabinteely; St Brigid's Mass Centre, Cabinteely (chapel of ease)	1971	Constituted from Cabinteely-Foxrock; Cabinteely
3	Johnstown-Killiney	Our Lady of Good Counsel, Johnstown	1974	Constituted from Cabinteely; Johnstown-Killiney
3	Loughlinstown	St Columbanus, Loughlinstown	1982	Constituted from Ballybrack-Killiney; Loughlinstown
3	Sallynoggin	Our Lady of Victories, Sallynoggin	1966	Constituted from Glasthule; Sallynoggin
3	Shankill	St Anne's, Shankill	1971	Constituted from Ballybrack-Killiney; Shankill
4	Dalkey	Church of the Assumption, Dalkey	1927	Constituted from Glasthule; Dalkey
4	Dún Laoghaire	St Michael's, Dún Laoghaire	1829	Constituted from Loughlinstown; Dún Laoghaire
4	Glasthule	St Joseph's, Glasthule	1927	Constituted from Dalkey; Glasthule
5	Greystones	Holy Rosary, Greystones; St Kilian's, Blacklion (chapel of ease)		Constituted from Bray; Greystones
5	Kilquade	St Joseph's, Newtownmountkennedy; St Patrick's, Kilquade; St Anthony of Padua, Kilcoole (chapel of ease); Holy Spirit Oratory, Newcastle (chapel of ease)	1400	Constituted from Newcastle; Kilquade

==== Donnybrook ====
The Donnybrook deanery is located within the city of Dublin and the civil county of Dún Laoghaire-Rathdown.

The vicar forane is Fr. Fergus O’Connor.

Parish Partnership	Parish	Churches and chapels of ease	Constituted	Other details
1	Balally	Ascension of Our Lord, Balally	1977	Constituted from Sandyford; Balally
1	Ballinteer	St John the Evangelist, Ballinteer	1974	Constituted from Dundrum; Ballinteer
1	Dundrum	Holy Cross, Dundrum	1878	Constituted from Booterstown; Dundrum
1	Meadowbrook	St Attracta's Oratory, Ballinteer	1983	Constituted from Ballinteer; Meadowbrook
2	Haddington Road	St Mary's, Haddington Road	1876	Constituted from Donnybrook, Irishtown, Ringsend and Sandymount; Haddington Road
2	Ringsend	St Patrick's, Ringsend	1905	Constituted from Irishtown, Ringsend and Sandymount; Ringsend
2	Sandymount	Our Lady, Star of the Sea, Sandymount	1851	Sandymount
3	Booterstown	Church of the Assumption, Booterstown		Constituted prior to 1616; Booterstown
3	Donnybrook	Church of the Sacred Heart, Donnybrook	1876	Constituted from Donnybrook, Irishtown, Ringsend and Sandymount; Donnybrook
3	Merrion Road	Our Lady Queen of Peace, Merrion	1964	Constituted from Booterstown; Merrion Road
3	Milltown	Assumption and Ss Columbanus and Gall, Milltown	1974	Constituted from Rathgar; Milltown
4	Clonskeagh	Immaculate Virgin Mary of the Miraculous Medal, Clonskeagh	1965	Constituted from Donnybrook; Clonskeagh
4	Kilmacud	St Laurence O'Toole, Kilmacud	1964	Constituted from Kilmacud and Mount Merrion; Kilmacud
4	Mount Merrion	St Thérèse, Mount Merrion	1964	Constituted from Kilmacud and Mount Merrion; Mount Merrion
5	Blackrock	St John the Baptist, Blackrock	1922	Constituted from Booterstown; Blackrock
5	Foxrock	Our Lady of Perpetual Succour, Foxrock	1971	Constituted from Cabinteely-Foxrock; Foxrock
5	Kill-o'-the-Grange	Holy Family, Kill-o'-the-Grange	1972	Constituted from Monkstown; Kill-o'-the-Grange
5	Monkstown	St Patrick's, Monkstown	1902	Constituted from Dún Laoghaire; Monkstown
5	Newtownpark	Guardian Angels, Newtownpark	1968	Constituted from Blackrock; Newtownpark

==== Wicklow ====
The Wicklow deanery is located within the traditional counties of Wexford and Wicklow.

The vicar forane is Fr. Derek Doyle.

Parish Partnership	Parish	Churches and chapels of ease	Constituted	Other details
1	Ashford	Most Holy Rosary, Ashford; St Joseph's, Glenealy (chapel of ease)	1864	Constituted from Wicklow Ashford
1	Kilbride and Barndarrig	St Mary's, Barndarrig; St Brigid's, Kilbride (chapel of ease)		Kilbride and Barndarrig
1	Wicklow	St Patrick's, Wicklow; St Joseph's, Rathnew (chapel of ease)	6th century	Wicklow
2	Glendalough	St Kevin's, Laragh	6th century	Glendalough
2	Rathdrum	Ss Mary and Michael, Rathdrum; St Columba's, Greenane (chapel of ease); Ss Patrick and Kilian, Clara Vale (chapel of ease)		Constituted pre-Reformation; Rathdrum
2	Roundwood	St Laurence O'Toole, Roundwood; Sacred Heart, Moneystown (chapel of ease)	1974	Roundwood
3	Arklow	Ss Mary and Peter, Arklow; St David's, Johnstown (chapel of ease)	650	Arklow
3	Aughrim	The Most Sacred Heart, Aughrim	1890	Constituted from Arklow; Aughrim
3	Avoca	Ss Mary and Patrick, Avoca; St Kevin's, Ballycoog (chapel of ease); St Patrick's, Barranisky (chapel of ease); St Joseph's, Templerainey (chapel of ease)		Constituted prior to 1777; Avoca
3	Castletown	St Patrick's, Castletown	1974	Constituted from Arklow; Castletown. Partly to the south of Arklow in County Wicklow but mainly to the north of Gorey in County Wexford.

=== Under the pastoral responsibility of Fr. Enda Cunningham ===
==== Cullenswood ====
The Cullenswood deanery is located entirely within the city of Dublin.

The vicar forane is Fr. Paul Taylor.

Parish Partnership	Parish	Churches and chapels of ease	Constituted	Other details
1	Clogher Road	St Bernadette's, Crumlin	1947	Constituted from Dolphin's Barn; Clogher Road
1	Crumlin	St Agnes, Crumlin	1941	Constituted from Terenure; Crumlin
1	Mourne Road	Our Lady of Good Counsel, Drimnagh	1942	Constituted from Dolphin's Barn and Terenure; Mourne Road
1	Walkinstown	Church of the Assumption of the Blessed Virgin Mary, Walkinstown	1964	Constituted from Crumlin; Walkinstown
2	Beechwood Avenue	Church of the Holy Name, Ranelagh	1906	Constituted from Rathgar; Beechwood Avenue
2	Harold's Cross	Our Lady of the Rosary, Harold's Cross	1935	Constituted from Rathgar, Rathmines and Terenure; Harold's Cross
2	Mount Argus	St Paul of the Cross, Harold's Cross	1974	Mount Argus
2	Rathgar	Church of the Three Patrons, Rathgar	1882	Constituted from Rathmines; Rathgar
2	Rathmines	Mary Immaculate, Refuge of Sinners, Rathmines	1835	Rathmines
3	Bluebell	Our Lady of the Wayside, Bluebell	1967	Constituted from Inchicore; Bluebell
3	Inchicore (Mary Immaculate)	May Immaculate, Inchicore	1972	Constituted from Inchicore; Inchicore (Mary Immaculate)
3	Inchicore (St Michael's)	St Michael's, Inchicore	1933	Constituted from St James'; Inchicore (St Michael's)

==== North City Centre ====
The North City Centre deanery is located entirely within the city of Dublin.

The vicar forane is Fr. Kieran McDermott.

Parish Partnership	Parish	Churches and chapels of ease	Constituted	Other details
1	East Wall	St Joseph's, East Wall	1941	Constituted from North Wall; East Wall
1	North Wall	St Laurence O'Toole, North Wall	1853	North Wall
1	North William Street	St Agatha's, North William Street	1865	Constituted from Cathedral; North William Street
2	Berkeley Road	St Joseph's, Berkeley Road	1890	Constituted from Halston Street; Berkeley Road
2	Gardiner Street	St Francis Xavier, Gardiner Street	1974	Gardiner Street
2	Cathedral	St Mary's Cathedral, Marlborough Street	1825	Constituted from Liffey Street; Cathedral
2	Seán McDermott Street	Our Lady of Lourdes, Seán McDermott Street	1970	Constituted from Cathedral; Seán McDermott Street
3	Aughrim Street	Holy Family, Aughrim Street		Aughrim Street
3	Dominick Street	St Saviour's, Dominick Street	1974	Dominick Street
3	Halston Street	St Michan's, Halston Street; St Mary of the Angels, Church Street		Halston Street

==== South City Centre ====
The South City Centre deanery is located entirely within the city of Dublin.

The vicar forane is Fr. Seán Ford.

Parish Partnership	Parish	Churches and chapels of ease	Constituted	Other details
1	Francis Street	St Nicholas of Myra, Francis Street	1829	Francis Street
1	James' Street	St James', James' Street	1724	Constituted from Meath Street; James' Street
1	Meath Street	St Catherine of Alexandria, Meath Street	13th century	Meath Street
2	City Quay	Immaculate Heart of Mary, City Quay	1908	Constituted from Westland Row; City Quay
2	Harrington Street	St Kevin's, Harrington Street	1865	Constituted from Francis Street; Harrington Street
2	University Church	Newman University Church, St Stephen's Green	1974	Constituted from Harrington Street; University Church
2	Westland Row	St Andrew's, Westland Row	c. 1750	Constituted from St Andrew, St Mark, St Peter and St Anne; Westland Row
2	Whitefriar Street	Our Lady of Mount Carmel, Aungier Street	1974	Whitefriar Street
3	Dolphin's Barn	Our Lady of Dolours, Dolphin's Barn	1902	Constituted from James' Street; Dolphin's Barn
3	Donore Avenue	St Theresa of the Child Jesus, Donore Avenue	1946	Constituted from Meath Street; Donore Avenue
3	Rialto	Our Lady of the Holy Rosary of Fátima, Rialto	1968	Constituted from Dolphin's Barn; Rialto

=== Other parishes ===
There is also a diocese-wide parish of the Travelling People, which was established by Archbishop Dermot Ryan in 1980 in response to the unique pastoral needs of the Traveller community in the archdiocese. The parish is under the pastoral care of Fr. Paul O'Driscoll.
