= St. John the Baptist parish =

St. John the Baptist parish may refer to one of a number of religious organisations:

In the district of Clontarf, Dublin, Ireland:

- The Church of Ireland Parish of Clontarf
- The senior Parish of Clontarf (Roman Catholic)
- The first known Anglican parish in Brazil, settled in Nova Lima, State of Minas Gerais in 1834.

It may also refer to St. John the Baptist Parish, Louisiana, a municipal subdivision in the state of Louisiana.
