= St Anthony's parish, Clontarf (Roman Catholic) =

Church in Dublin, Ireland

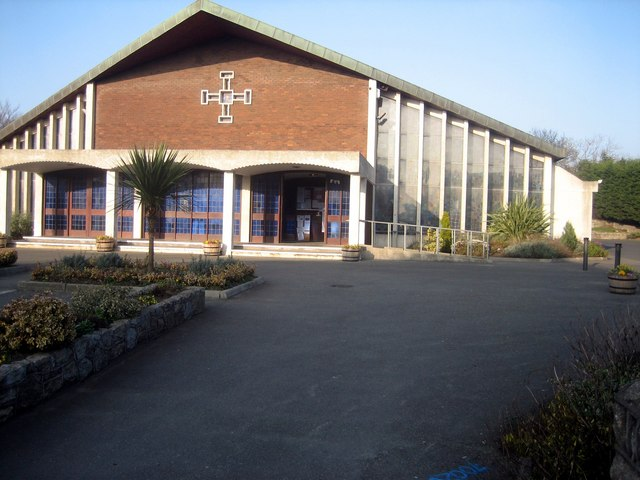
St. Anthony's, Clontarf Road

St Anthony's parish, Clontarf is a parish of the Roman Catholic Church, serving part of Clontarf on the Northside of Dublin, Ireland.

== History ==
The parish was formed in 1966 when it separated from the historic Parish of Clontarf, now known as St. John's Parish, Clontarf. The parish is in the Fingal South East deanery of the Roman Catholic Archdiocese of Dublin.

== Area ==
The parish takes in the part of Clontarf from the junction of Howth Road with Clontarf Road, passing south of the Parish of Killester, and then splitting the district along the line of Castle Avenue. This area includes the Garda station, a secondary retail area, and residential localities such as Seafield.

Within the parish bounds was once a holy well, named for either St. Philip or St. Dennis. Located in the vicinity of The Stiles Road, this well is no longer visible.

== Church ==
The parish is served by the Church of St Anthony of Padua, built in 1975. The building succeeded an older building of the same name that served as a chapel-of-ease. This older building previously served as Clontarf Town Hall during the brief period when the district was incorporated as a town, under the control of local Commissioners.

== See also ==
- For the earlier history of the Catholic faith in the area, see Parish of Clontarf (Roman Catholic) and Parish of Coolock (Roman Catholic)
- St Gabriel's parish, Dollymount
- St John's parish, Clontarf (Roman Catholic)

== Sources ==
- Dublin: Catholic Truth Society, 1915; Donnelly, N. (Canea, Bishop of); Short Histories of Dublin Parishes, Vol. XIV.
