= Clontarf parish =

Clontarf parish may refer to one of a number of religious organisations, not all of which yet have articles in Wikipedia. Some possibilities are:

In the district of Clontarf, Dublin, Ireland:

- Church of Ireland Parish of Clontarf, an Anglican parish with a long history
- Parish of Clontarf (Roman Catholic), founded in the 12th century, including its successors, the three such parishes today, Clontarf (St. John's), Clontarf (St. Anthony's) and Dollymount (St. Gabriel's)
