= Kilmeade =

Kilmeade may refer to:

- Kilmead, a village in County Kildare, Ireland, officially named Kilmeade
- Brian Kilmeade, American presenter/commentator on Fox News
