= Bugisi =

Coordinates: 3.8261°S 33.0733°E

Bugisi is a Catholic parish near Didia in northern Tanzania. It is a "twin parish" of Queen of Peace parish in Bray, County Wicklow, Ireland.
