= Cill Míde =

Cill Míde is the Irish-language name for two villages in Ireland:

- Kilmead, County Kildare
- Kilmeedy, County Limerick
