= St Gabriel's parish, Dollymount =

St Gabriel's parish in Dollymount, Dublin was formed in 1966 when it separated from the historic Parish of Clontarf. The parish is in the Fingal South East deanery of the Roman Catholic Archdiocese of Dublin. It is served by the Church of St Gabriel, with its adjoining parish hall. St Gabriel's serves a population of over 6,000.

== See also ==
- For the earlier history of the Catholic faith in the area, see Parish of Clontarf (Roman Catholic) and Parish of Coolock (Roman Catholic)
- St Anthony's parish, Clontarf (Roman Catholic)
- St John's parish, Clontarf (Roman Catholic)

== Sources ==
- Dublin: Catholic Truth Society, 1915; Donnelly, N. (Canea, Bishop of); Short Histories of Dublin Parishes, Vol. XIV.
