= St John's parish, Clontarf (Roman Catholic) =

Roman Catholic parish in Dublin

Coordinates: 53°21′50.7″N 6°12′08.8″W

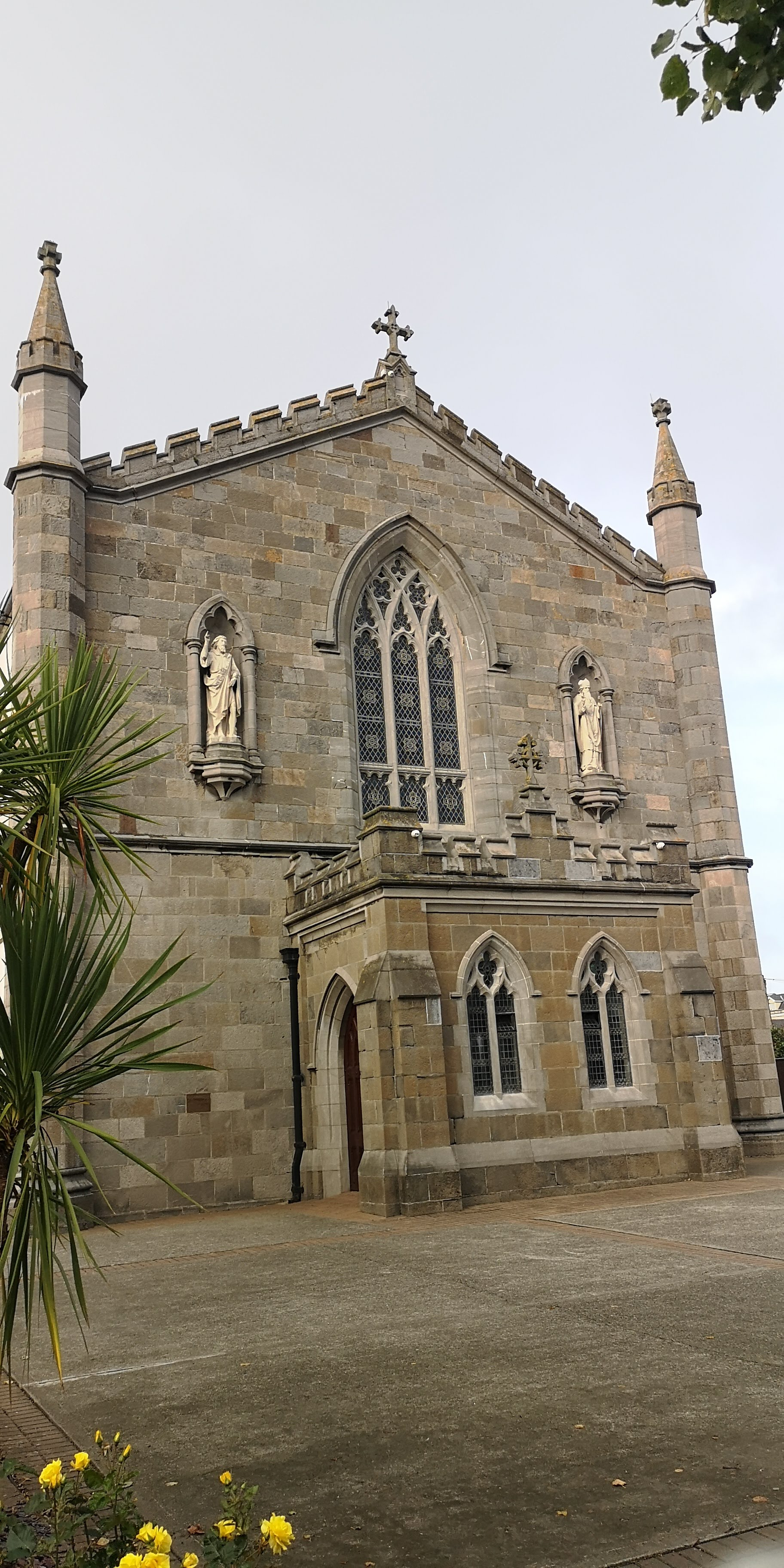
Church of St John the Baptist, Clontarf

St John's parish, Clontarf is a parish of the Roman Catholic Church, serving part of Clontarf on the Northside of Dublin, Ireland.

== History ==
The parish was formed in 1966 when the other parts of the historic Parish of Clontarf were separated, becoming St Anthony's Parish, Clontarf, and St Gabriel's Parish, Dollymount. The parish is in the Fingal South East deanery of the Roman Catholic Archdiocese of Dublin.

== Area ==
The parish takes in the main centre of modern Clontarf, where Vernon Avenue meets the coast road, and from Castle Avenue near Killester to Dollymount, and then around Dollymount to Saint Anne's Park. It has a population of over 7,000. Near to the parish church is a convent and school of the Sisters of the Holy Faith.

== Church ==
The parish is served by the Church of St John the Baptist on Clontarf Road. This building is the modern site of a building that had existed in the area for centuries. It was funded by a legacy and opened in 1825 on the site of the locality formerly known as "the Sheds," an area of fish curing facilities and mud cabins.

== See also ==
- Parish of Coolock (Roman Catholic) for the earlier history of the Catholic faith in the area
- St Anthony's parish, Clontarf (Roman Catholic)
- St Gabriel's parish, Dollymount

== Sources ==
- Dublin: Catholic Truth Society, 1915; Donnelly, N. (Canea, Bishop of); Short Histories of Dublin Parishes, Vol. XIV.
