= Barrowhouse =

Barrowhouse may refer to:

- Barrowhouse, County Laois, a townland in County Laois, Ireland
- Barrowhouse GAA, a Gaelic Athletic Association club located in Barrowhouse
