= St Anthony's Hall, Clontarf =

Municipal building in Clontarf, Dublin, Ireland

St Anthony's Hall
- Halla Naomh Antaine
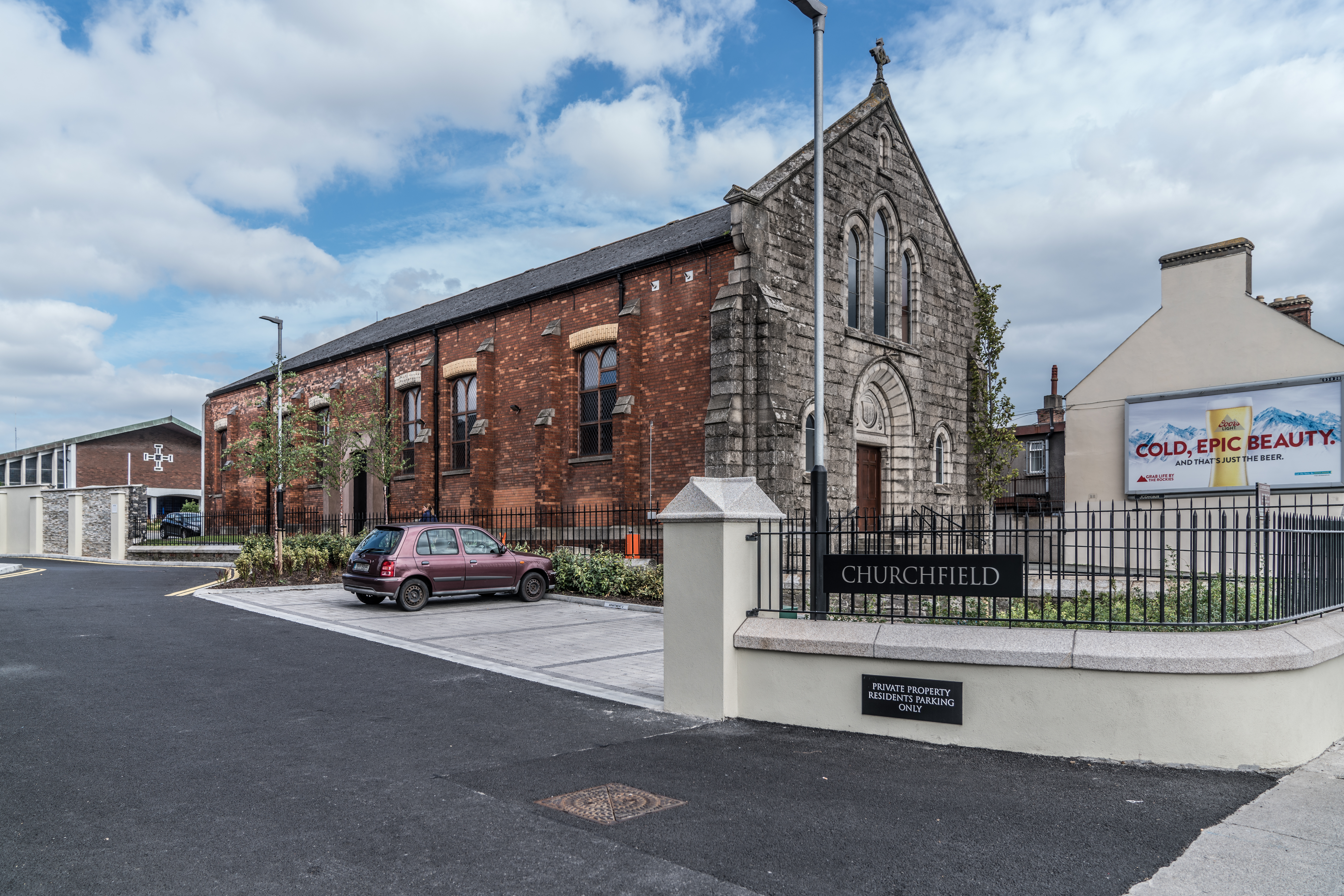
- St Anthony's Hall

- Location within Dublin

General information
- Architectural style: Gothic Revival style
- Location: Clontarf Road, Clontarf, Ireland
- Coordinates: 53.3627°N 6.2174°W
- Completed: 1896

Design and construction
- Architect: William George Perrott

St Anthony's Hall (Irish: Halla Naomh Antaine), previously known as St Anthony's Parish Church (Irish: Eaglais Pharóiste Naomh Antaine) and, before that, Contarf Town Hall (Irish: Halla an Bhaile Cluain Tarbh) is a former ecclesiastical building and, before that, municipal building in Clontarf Road, Clontarf, Dublin, Ireland. It is now used as a parish hall for St Anthony's Parish Church.

== History ==
After significant population growth, partly associated with the area's status as a tourist destination but also associated with its development as a residential suburb of Dublin, the township of Clontarf appointed town commissioners in 1869. In the early 1890s, the town commissioners decided to erect a town hall: the site they selected on the north side of Clontarf Road was donated by the local land-owner, Colonel Edward Vernon, whose seat was at Clontarf Castle. The new building was designed by William George Perrott in the Gothic Revival style, built by Robert Farquharson in red brick and was completed in 1896. The design involved a gabled main frontage facing onto Clontarf Road. The side elevations of six bays each were fenestrated by pairs of lancet windows and flanked by buttresses.

In 1899, the town commissioners were replaced by an urban district council, with the building on Clontarf Road briefly serving as the meeting place of the new council. However, the town hall ceased to the local seat of government in 1900, when the urban district was annexed by the City of Dublin.

The Irish republican, Michael McGinn, became caretaker of the town hall in 1901, and also became keeper of the town hall library, which was established in the building in 1902. He played an important role in facilitating meetings of the supreme council of the Irish Republican Brotherhood at the town hall. It was at such a meeting in the town hall, in January 1916, that the supreme council agreed a proposal from Seán Mac Diarmada that a rebellion should proceed "at the earliest date possible". It was at the same meeting that the leader of the Irish Citizen Army, James Connolly, was persuaded to join the rebellion. On 16 April 1916, another republican, Paddy Daly, was questioned in the town hall on his proposal to destroy the Magazine Fort in the Phoenix Park: the Easter Rising went ahead a week later.

The town hall, which had already started showing silent films re-opened after the First World War as a picture theatre in December 1919. After Michael McGinn's death, his wife, Catherine, became caretaker at the town hall and provided accommodation for republican leaders during the Irish War of Independence.

The building was converted into a chapel of ease in 1926. The main frontage facing onto Clontarf Road was refaced in rusticated granite. The new facing featured an arched doorway, which was dressed with an ashlar granite architrave and enhanced with a carved shield in the tympanum. The entrance was flanked by two small arched windows and there was a tripartite mullioned window on the first floor. The building went on to be a parish church in its own right, as St Anthony's Parish Church, in 1966. After a modern Catholic Church was built for the parish just to the north in 1975, the original building was converted for use as the parish hall for the area and became known as St Anthony's Hall. The former presbytery at the back of the hall was demolished in 1998.
