= Rolestown =

Village in Fingal, County Dublin

Rolestown Baile an Rólaigh / Baile Rothluis (Irish)
- Village
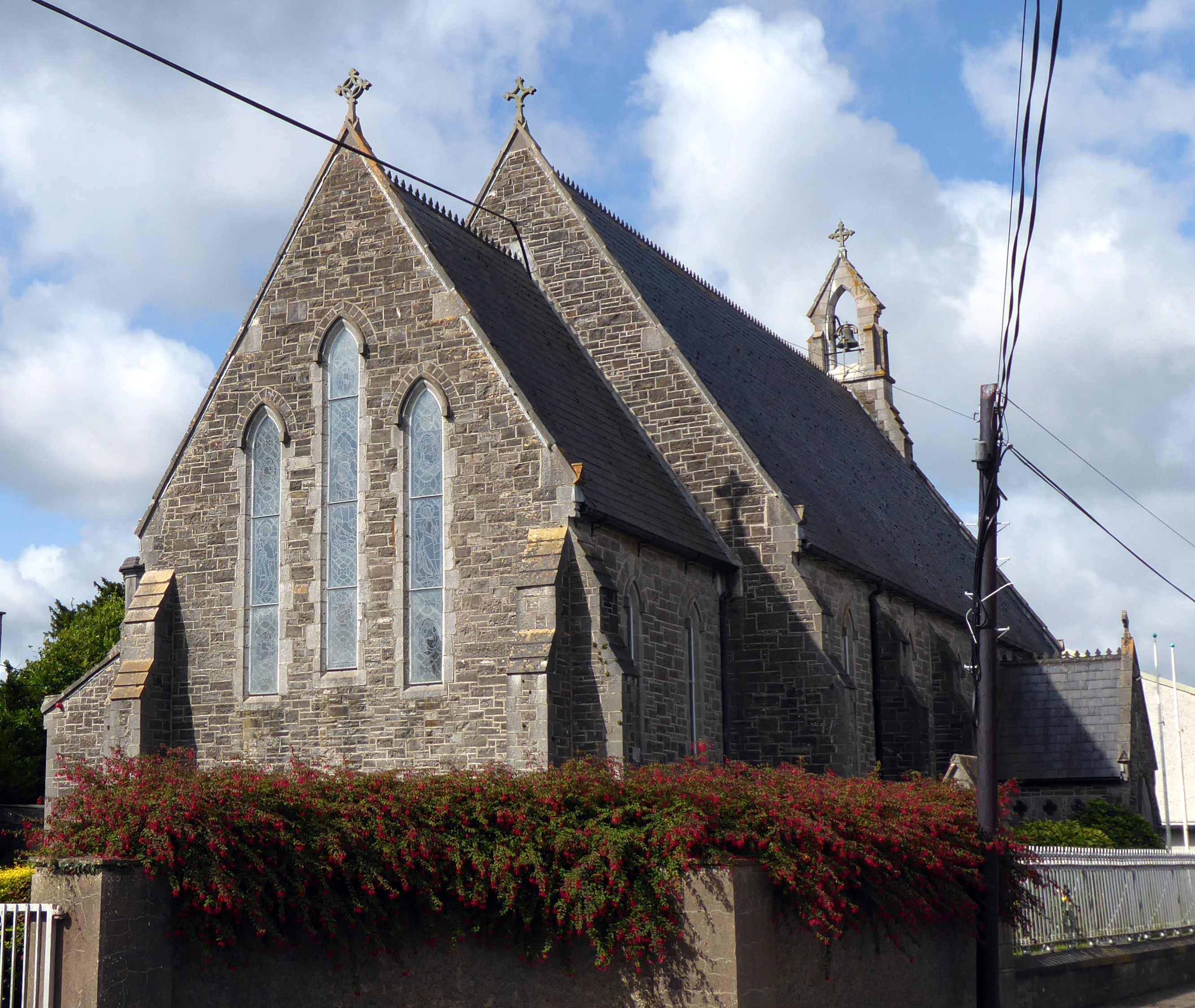
- St Bridget's Killossery Church, Rolestown

- Location in Dublin
- Coordinates: 53°29′18″N 6°18′15″W
- Country: Ireland
- Province: Leinster
- County: County Dublin
- Local authority: Fingal County Council

Rolestown or Rowlestown (Irish: Baile an Rólaigh / Baile Rothluis) is a small village six miles (10 km) northwest of Swords along the R125 in Fingal, County Dublin, Ireland. It lies within the parish of Killossery (Cill Lasra). The village is built along two parallel roads on both sides of the Broadmeadow River, joined by an old stone bridge. Rolestown is also a parish in the Fingal North deanery of the Roman Catholic Archdiocese of Dublin.

== Location and access ==
Rolestown lies on either side of a floodplain of the Broadmeadow River Valley. The northern part of the village is located on elevated ground. The area centred on the graveyard, old corn mill, bridge and approach to the gates of Rowlestown House, is characterised by distinctive heritage buildings and mature trees.

The settlement is located between the R125, which leads to Oldtown and Garristown, and the R106, which leads to Ballyboughal and Naul to the north, and Dublin Airport to the south. While historically characterised by dispersed ribbon development and one-off housing, Rolestown has expanded considerably in recent decades with the addition of several modern residential estates.

== Community structure ==
Traditionally, the Rolestown area has a distinct relationship with the town of Swords, located 7 km away. Many of the local council housing estates built in the Swords area were used to house families from the Rolestown/Kilsallaghan area. Most Rolestown families send their children to secondary schools in Swords, and many Swords residents play Gaelic football for Fingal Ravens GFC in Rolestown.

In the Roman Catholic Church, the parish of is part of a team ministry with Garristown and Naul.

== History ==
Rolestown originated as a small river settlement at a crossing point of the Broadmeadow River several hundred years ago. The 1658 census of Ireland recorded 41 inhabitants of Rolestown (of 120 persons in the Clonmethan area, which included Rowlestown). Around 1700, lands were given to the Catholic Church for a chapel, garden and paddock.

The 1837 (First Edition) Ordnance Survey Map indicated that the village had grown sufficiently for a National School to be constructed on the edge of the village.

Beside the Broadmeadow River bridge stands the historic Rolestown Corn Mill (recorded in the townland of Killossery), a protected structure comprising a two-storey stone corn mill and an adjoining traditional thatched mud-walled (cob) miller's house—one of the last surviving vernacular mud-walled buildings in County Dublin. Grain milling on the site is documented from at least the late sixteenth century and appears on both the mid-seventeenth-century Down Survey and the 1837 Ordnance Survey map. From the 1830s until the mid-twentieth century, the Delany family—and subsequently the Daly family—operated the site, with commercial grain milling ceasing around the 1940s while the adjoining grocery shop and off-licence continued operating into the late twentieth century (despite popular local folklore romanticising the premises as an unlicensed shebeen, it, in fact, always operated under a formal retail liquor licence). Although commercial redevelopment plans for the complex were refused by Fingal County Council in 2022, the site has received Built Heritage Investment Scheme grant funding to carry out structural repairs and stabilise its historic cob walls.

The church called Killossery (the church of St. Ossier in Irish) was built near the banks of the river in the seventeenth century. The parish of Killossery consisted of 2500 acres (10 km^{2}) and over 380 inhabitants in the nineteenth century. The parish was so large at one point that it included all of Rolestown and Lispopple. The current church (pictured above) is named St. Brigid's Church and was built in the 1850s, and had some extensive repair work done in the late 1990s. The Big House (Rowlestown House) originally belonged to the Corbally family and is currently owned by the Griffin family.

The old castle in Killsallaghlan, an area of Rolestown, is surrounded by woodland, hence its name Coill Saileacháin (the Sally Wood). The castle was destroyed in 1641. The oldest still functioning building in the area appears to be Rowlestown House which was constructed in the Georgian style between 1750 and 1770 and is still used as a dwelling as of 2020.

== Education ==
Rolestown only has a National School, a primary school for 4 to 12/13-year-old children. The original old school building excluding prefabricated classrooms was originally built to accommodate the immediate area of Rolestown/Kilsallaghan.

Local businessman, Pat McDonagh, sponsored the building of a new school building to replace the old school.

== Resources ==
There is no public open space currently provided in the village. The primary school has a small junior playing field and a hard surface basketball court to the side of the building. In the surrounding area, there are a number of private leisure facilities, including a GAA pitch and clubhouse. In the local area, there is also a bar/pub with an adjoining restaurant and hotel but this is not located within the village centre. There is a church hall which hosts classes on drama, badminton, Tae Kwon Do, soccer, creche services, traditional Irish dancing and other local community activities like the local Catholic church committee meetings, Irish Countrywomen's Association (I.C.A.) meetings and local fund-raisers such as the sale-of-work and several cake sales throughout the year. A historical association was formed in the past few years with the purpose of documenting the history of the parish and area. The drama society puts on a traditional pantomime every year in mid-January. A Maxol petrol/service station was opened to replace an old service station which closed down around the early 2000s. The site which was developed for this now also has a small business centre.

== Sport ==
Fingal Ravens is the local Gaelic Athletic Association club. Rolestown Cho's Tae Kwon-Do is also based locally.

== Public transport ==
The 41B Dublin Bus Service serves Rolestown. The bus goes from Dublin city centre through Dublin Airport and Swords, terminating at Rolestown Bridge. The 197 Go-Ahead Bus Service also serves Rolestown, running from Swords to Ashbourne every hour. There are no other public transport services passing through or running close to the village.

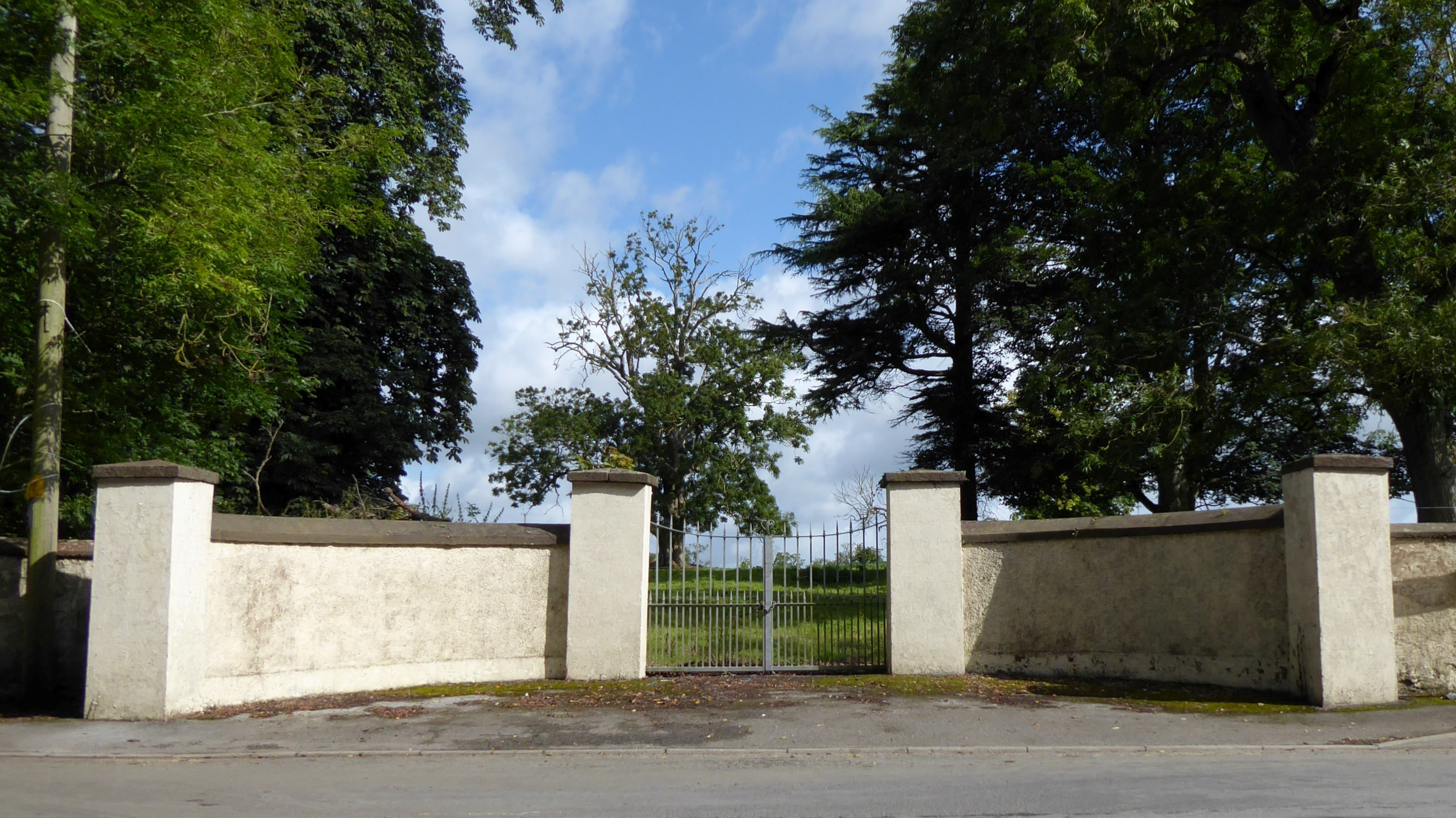
Gates leading to earlier driveway and lawns of Rowlestown House

== Lawn Gates ==
At the end of the T-junction (after crossing Rolestown Bridge which goes over The Broad Meadow stream towards the local hall) a pair of old white gates lie at the entrance to the original house driveway and a field. This field runs on the east side of the aforementioned Rolestown House. Here, up until the late 1950s and early 1960s, carnivals were held each year. These included sheep-shearing competitions, sheepdog trials and fancy-dress competitions. The carnival was lit with lights going all the way up the field to a large marquee-style tent where at the end of the carnival a dance would be held at night.

== See also ==
- List of towns and villages in Ireland
