= Clontarf parish (Roman Catholic) =

Catholic parish in Dublin, Ireland

Founded in the early days of Irish Christian parish structures, the Parish of Clontarf assumed in 1829 the mantle of Union Parish for a large area of on the northside of Dublin, Ireland, a role previously filled by the Parish of Coolock, into which Clontarf had been subsumed in 1614 - refer to that article for history from 1618 to 1879. Clontarf itself is a large northside suburb of Dublin, and the parish was in the 20th century divided into the modern parishes which now serve that area.

== Early history ==
The Celtic Church was primarily based around monastic settlements, and it is a local tradition that the first church at Clontarf was erected for or by St. Comgall, on a mission from one of the founding monastic houses of the Dublin area, probably Glasnevin. Based on this, Comgall was considered the patron of the parish into Anglo-Norman times. Dr. Donnelly noted in 1915, however, that there is no documentary or other evidence for this and that the first records of Christian activity are much later, long after even the Battle of Clontarf.

In the 12th century, the Irish Church moved towards a parochial model, and following restructuring under figures such as St. Malachy, Archbishop of Armagh, and the papal legate Cardinal Paparo in 1152, thirty-eight dioceses, each comprising a number of parishes, were approved. The Diocese of Dublin, previously a small "island" in the middle of the vast Diocese of Glendalough, was raised to the status of Archdiocese, with forty parishes, one of which was Clontarf. The boundaries of this ancient parish are probably best reflected today in those of the civil parish and the Church of Ireland parish of the same name.

Henry II of England visited Dublin in 1172 and founded a branch of the Knights Templar, granting them lands including "the Vill of Clumtorf". By the time of Edward III of England, the Manor of Clontarf was valued at over 125 pounds, with annual income of over 32 pounds, and had a parish church, to which the Templars had the right to appoint a chaplain. It is believed this situation continued into the 14th century, when the Templars were attacked by the King of France, with support from the Pope. A writ for their imprisonment and seizure of their assets reached Ireland in January 1308, and they were arrested within weeks. Some years later, the Pope dissolved the order and transferred their property to the Knights Hospitaller, who eventually took possession of Clontarf, making it a Commandery (this later became Clontarf Castle). It is believed that the Manor and Priory Church then continued under the jurisdiction of the Hospitallers until the dissolution of the monasteries.

=== From the dissolution of the monasteries to 1829 ===
At the dissolution, the priory of Clontarf was closed. The last prior, Sir John Rawson, was made Viscount Clontarf, with a pension, a seat in Parliament and a grant of the commandery as his manor house.

Following the break between Henry VIII and the Papacy, the Anglican Churches came into being and sometime between this point - around 1536, when Henry VIII imposed the Act of Supremacy in Ireland - and the early years of the reign of Elizabeth I, there emerged two Parishes of Clontarf, one in the Roman Catholic Church, one in the Church of Ireland. During those early years of new church arrangements, it is believed that the church continued to serve the Catholic population at the local church, the right of presentment being retained by the King family, who remained "staunch Catholics".

In one related further series of events, Cromwell gave the former commandery and lands to a man named Blackwell, for military service and in return for a yearly rent of one shilling, and he transferred them to Captain (or Admiral) John Vernon. The Vernon family were able to hold their place even after the Restoration, and they built the core of the current castle in the 19th century, prior to its sale in the 1930s and the subsequent development of its land, with the main building expanded as a hotel.

For the period from 1614 until 1829, Clontarf was part of the Union Parish of Coolock, and that article contains the history. Notably, for almost this entire period, Clontarf had no Catholic place of worship, the first church, a small chapel dedicated to St. John the Baptist, being built only in 1825. This was a plain rectangular building beside the "big house" called Summerville, behind a row of contemporary housing, and was funded largely by a legacy of 1,000 Irish pounds left by an Edmund Keary.

=== The Union Parish of Clontarf, 1829-1879 ===
James Callanan, made a canon in April 1829, was appointed Parish Priest of the Union Parish in May of that year, having two curates, Charles Boyle and William Walsh. Callanan arranged for the extension to the south east of the chapel at Clontarf and purchased with personal funds a house (where the Holy Faith Convent, Clontarf now stands) as parochial residence.

In the middle of the parish, the Monastery Chapel in Fairview was succeeded by a mass house in 1830, and when this was given up, Fr. Boyle made plans for a church on a site near Annesley Bridge, collecting building materials there. These plans were abandoned due to construction problems with the site, and the leasehold of the then closed Carmelite monastery was instead obtained, the curate moving into the house, and the Monastery Chapel reopened as a church.

Fr. Callanan applied in the early 1830s to Clontarf's leading landowner, Colonel Vernon, for a site for a larger church, suggesting that the locality known and mapped as "the Sheds" would be suitable. This area of small lanes and mud cabins held around 200 families, mostly working in the fishery, and the Vernons were keen to improve it, so they offered a 99-year lease if the parish priest could clear it. Fr. Callanan leased land behind his house for some of the fishing families to build homes, and the remnants of this development became known as Snugboro. Having paid monetary compensation to the other families, Callanan secured the offered land and the foundation stone of the Church of St. John the Baptist was laid in 1835 (when the curate William Walsh, eventually Archbishop of Halifax, left the parish, replaced by a Fr. Power). Building took some years, even utilising the materials collected for the failed church project in Fairview, but mass began to be celebrated there in 1838 and the church was finished in the early 1840s.

Both curates left in 1839, being replaced by Edward Kennedy and Edward MacCabe (eventually Archbishop and Cardinal). Then, in 1842, at the Drumcondra end of the union parish, the Foreign Missionary College of All Hallows was opened. In 1846, Fr. Callanan died and was succeeded by Cornelius Rooney (1796–1878), already a canon.

In 1847, Canon Rooney secured leasehold land on Philipsburgh Avenue for the purpose-built Church of the Visitation, Fairview, which opened in 1855. In the meantime, the former curate, Fr. Boyle, now parish priest of Skerries, supervised the building of a new church, dedicated to St. Pappan, at Ballymun. The land for this was provided rent-free by Sir Compton Domville (of Santry Demesne) and the construction, finished in 1848, funded by a James Coughlan. Also in 1847, a school for ladies was established at Baymount by a branch of Rathfarnham Convent (it moved to Balbriggan in 1862 following a severe fire).

In 1850, a third curate, Ambose McGarry, was obtained, and in 1853, McCabe was succeeded by Fr. William Purcell. In 1854, the Religious Sisters of the Sacred Heart established a house at Glasnevin and Fr. Purcell moved nearby to act as chaplain and as curate overseeing Glasnevin and Ballymun. A fourth curate, Michael Brady was then secured for Clontarf, and from then on there was increasing clerical activity.

The parish priest also secured land at the top of Main Street, Raheny, in the 1850s, and commenced collection of subscriptions for a new church there. A design was commissioned by the well-known architect Patrick Byrne, who also worked on a number of other churches, and the first stone of the newer St. Assam's Church was laid in 1859. The church was officially opened in 1864 by the Roman Catholic Archbishop of Dublin, Paul Cullen, and there are fuller details in the relevant article.

By the time of the death of Canon Rooney in October 1878, the union parish had five churches, four built during his tenure, and all free of debt.

=== Union Parishes from 1879 to 1909 ===
In 1879, after a gap of over six months due to a vacancy in the Archbishopric of Dublin, Patrick O'Neill was appointed the new parish priest, and the parish was divided, the ancient parishes of Drumcondra, Glasnevin, Santry and Artaine becoming the new Parish of Fairview, and a reduced Union Parish of Clontarf continuing with Raheny, Coolock, Killester and Clontarf itself. Rev. O'Neill retained two curates, Thomas Kennedy and Ferdinand Byrne at Coolock. Fr. Byrne was replaced by P. Fee in 1881, and he by T. Mulqueen in 1885.

In 1890, the Sisters of the Holy Faith opened a convent in Clontarf, with schools for young ladies and small boys, supported by a Miss Allingham, whose brother then sponsored an extension to the church and many fittings, to a cost of 6,000 Irish pounds. The convent secured the lease on Fr. Callanan's old house, which had been leased by his sister to the Royal Irish Constabulary, and built two-storey cottages behind it, accommodating forty families.

In 1892, Fr. Kennedy was succeeded by Fr. Hayden, then in 1897, Fr. O'Neill was made Vicar Forane of Fingal and Archdeacon of Dublin, and in 1898, an assistant, Henry Nowlan, was appointed. In 1901, a new lease for the schools for boys and girls (on Vernon Avenue) was obtained and Miss Allingham, who had also funded further work on the church, provided around 2,000 pounds to enlarge and equip them.

Archdeacon O'Neill bought houses numbers 1 and 2, St. John's Terrace in Clontarf with his own funds, and bequeathed them to the parish for the parish priest and curates respectively, also leaving other charitable bequests. On his death in 1909, the parish was divided, a new Union of Coolock and Raheny (including Killester, and with the chaplaincy of Artaine Industrial School attached) was formed, and the large Parish of Clontarf once more stood alone.

=== The Parish of Clontarf restored, and then divided ===
The now distinct parish was given James Hickey as parish priest, with two curates, Fr. Hayden and Fr. Meighan. In 1925, Canon Dempsey, the parish priest, bought the old Clontarf Town Hall, from the area's brief spell as an autonomous incorporated township, reopening it as a chapel-of-ease to the main church, dedicated to St. Anthony of Padua.

== The Parishes of Clontarf and Dollymount today ==
In later years, the parish was subdivided: the part of the parish around the original church site became the parish of St John; the part that is closest to the city (as far as Castle Avenue) became the parish of St Anthony; the part towards Raheny became the parish of St Gabriel, Dollymount.

== See also ==
- List of parishes of the Roman Catholic Archdiocese of Dublin by deanery

== Sources ==
- Dublin: Catholic Truth Society, 1915; Donnelly, N. (Canea, Bishop of); Short Histories of Dublin Parishes, Vol. XIV.
