= John Vernon (of Clontarf) =

Quartermaster-General of Oliver Cromwell's army

John Vernon (c. 1618 – 13 March 1670) was Quartermaster-General of Oliver Cromwell’s army and third son of Sir Edward Vernon, of Houndshill, Staffordshire, England. John obtained title to Clontarf Castle near Dublin in 1649 through a financial arrangement with John Blackwall who had been granted the estate by Oliver Cromwell. Thereafter the Vernons occupied the castle for approximately 300 years.

== See also ==
- Vernon family
- Vernon (surname)
- Clontarf, Dublin
- Clontarf Castle

== Sources ==
- 'Vernon of Clontarf Castle' in Burke's Landed Gentry of Ireland (1912) pp. 722–3
- Burke's Colonial Gentry (1891), available on Internet Archives: https://archive.org/details/genealogical01burk
- A Study of Vernon and Venables Families and Their Connections
