= Stanley Pettigrew =

Irish painter (1927–2022)

Stanley Pettigrew (1927 – 15 September 2022) was an Irish painter.

== Early life ==
Pettigrew was born in the Andes of Chile, the son of a mining engineer whose Scottish family had settled in County Sligo a generation earlier. His mother was a Blennerhassett from Tralee, County Kerry, the family's ancestry traces back to the Huguenots, driven out of France in the 16th century. He returned to Ireland with his family in 1930.

== Career ==
Stanley went to school in Sligo and was originally interested in carpentry. He met a painter, Jim Heuston, who developed Pettigrew's interest in landscape painting. Like Paul Henry, he was attracted to the cloud formations and reflective water of Sligos seascape.

In 1944 Pettigrew enrolled at Trinity College, Dublin, initially to study history and later divinity. He worked as a curate in Newcastle, giving him the opportunity to paint with Tom Carr. In 1954 he married Vera Brownell, known for her children's books. He lived in Wicklow from 1957, exhibiting at the Wicklow Painters Gallery and the Royal Hibernian Academy.

Pettigrew died in Limerick on 15 September 2022, aged 95.
