= Clontarf Castle =

Castle-style hotel on site of early castle in Dublin, Ireland

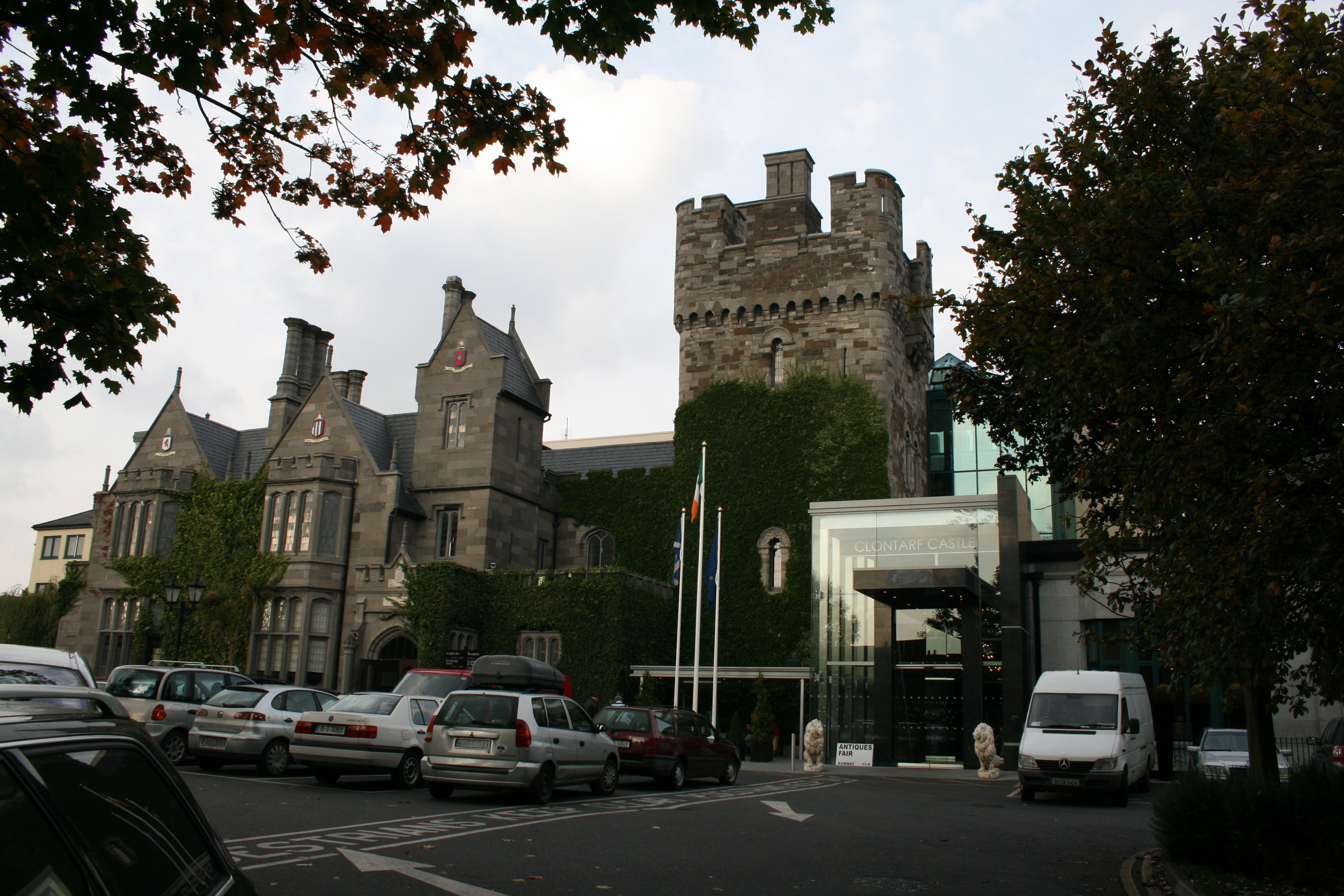
- Clontarf Castle from the front, showing 1837 core with modern lobby and other additions
- Interactive map of the Clontarf Castle area

General information
- Location: 3 Castle Avenue, Clontarf, Dublin, Dublin 3, Ireland
- Coordinates: 53.364754°N 6.206675°W
- Construction started: 1837 (current structure)
- Completed: 2002? (latest modifications)

Website
- http://www.clontarfcastle.ie

Clontarf Castle (Irish: Caisleán Chluain Tarbh) is a much-modernised castle, dating to 1837, in Clontarf, Dublin, Ireland, an area famous as a key location of the Battle of Clontarf in 1014. There has been a castle on the site since 1172. In modern times, it has functioned as a bar, cabaret venue, and hotel.

== History ==
=== deLacy family and the Templars ===
The first castle on the grounds, of which no trace remains, was built in 1172 by either Hugh de Lacy, Lord of Meath, or his tenant Adam de Phepoe. Clontarf was subsequently held by the Knights Templar, until they were in turn deprived of it at the Dissolution of the Monasteries. The last prior, John Rawson was created Viscount Clontarf in 1541 in return for surrendering the castle and its lands to the crown.

=== 16th century to 17th century ===
In 1600 Queen Elizabeth I granted the estate to Sir Geoffrey Fenton, her secretary of state for Ireland, and it passed by marriage from his descendants to the King family. George King of Clontarf took part in the Irish Rebellion of 1641 and as a result his lands were confiscated.

=== Vernon family ===
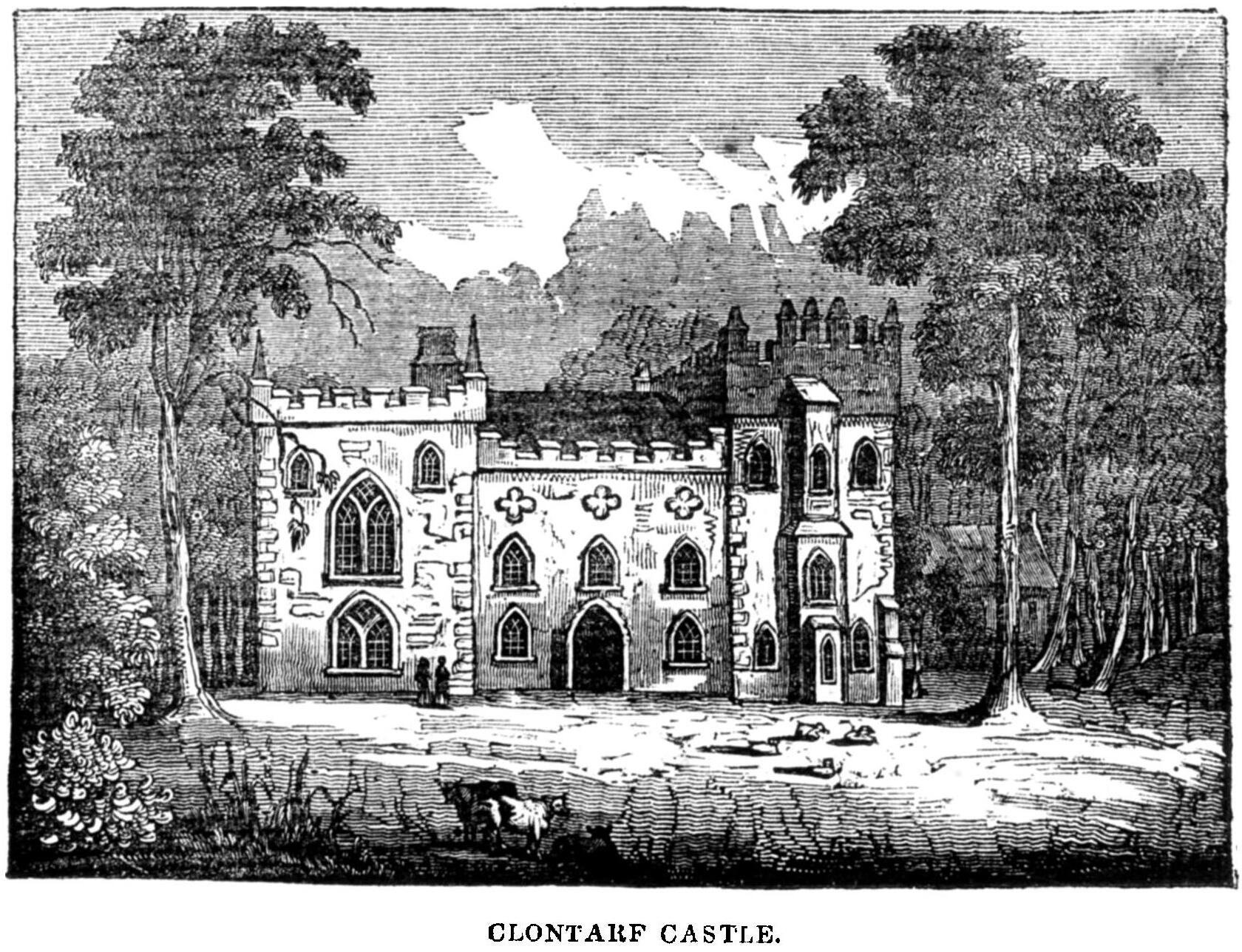
The castle in 1834, Dublin Penny Journal

At the Cromwellian conquest of Ireland, the Clontarf estate was given to Captain John Blackwell, on 14 August 1649. Blackwell afterwards sold his interest to John Vernon, Quartermaster General of Cromwell's army. The Vernon family was to remain in possession for some 300 years.

In 1660, John Vernon passed Clontarf Castle to his son, Edward Vernon. Edward died in 1684 and one of his sisters took possession. In 1695 a first cousin of Edward's, also named John Vernon, claimed rights and the estate was granted to him by an Act of Parliament in 1698.

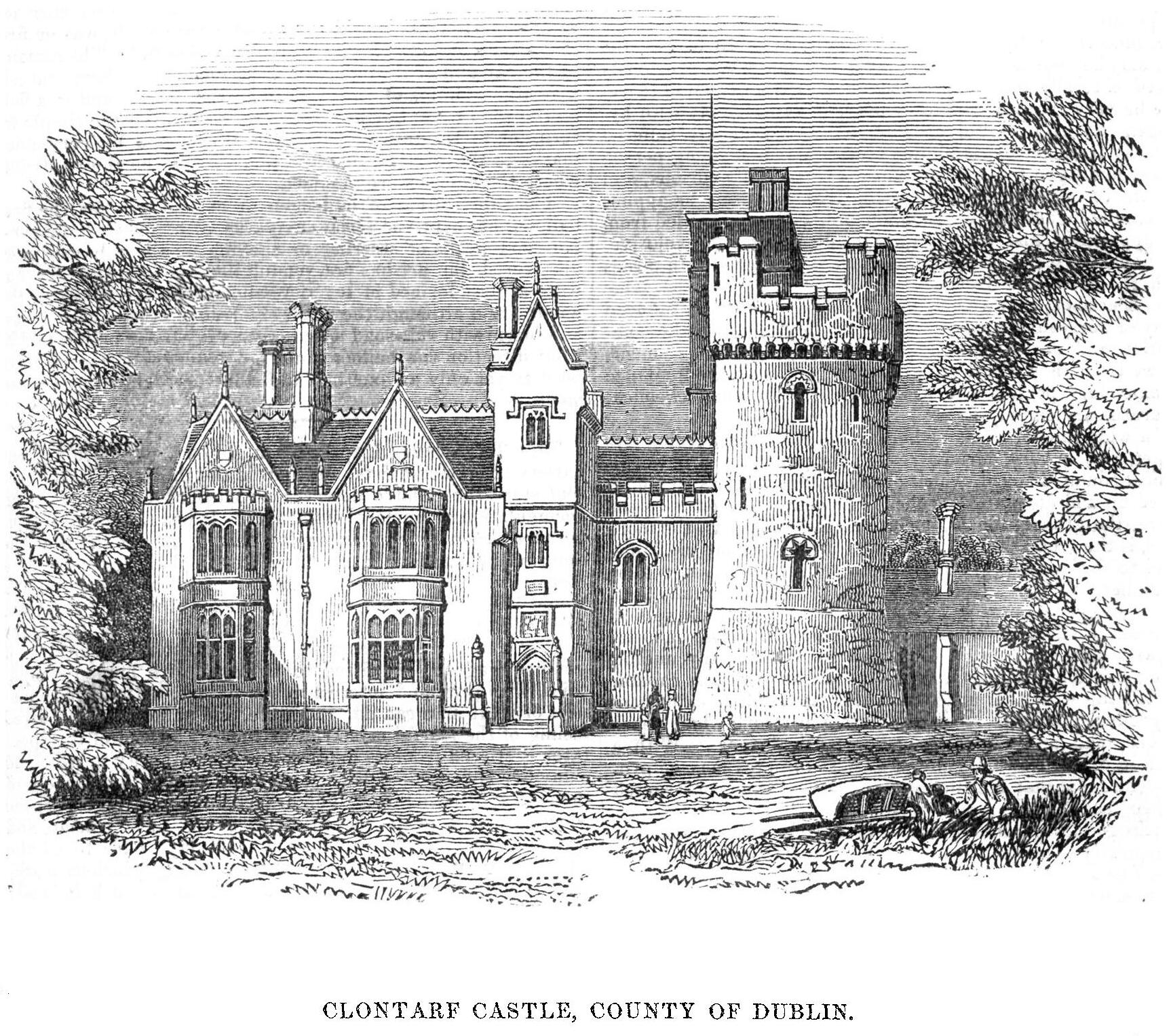
The castle in 1840, Irish Penny Journal

The last of the direct male line of Vernons at Clontarf was Edward Kingston Vernon (1869–1967), who succeeded to the estate on the death of his father Edward in 1913. He lived at the castle for only six months, after which time it was let to John George Oulton and his wife Mona, the only daughter of Walter Blades Calverley by Vernon's sister Edyth. The castle was finally sold to the Oultons in 1933.

JG Oulton, who took over the Vernon estate, died in the castle on 17 April 1952, and the Castle was left to his son, Desmond, who sold the property to pay death duties and other expenses.

=== 1957 to present ===
The castle remained vacant until 1957 when it was purchased by Mrs. Egan, who in turn sold it not long after to Eddie Regan in the 1960s. Gerry and Carmel Houlihan purchased the building in 1972 and ran it as a popular cabaret venue until 1998.

== Clontarf Castle Hotel ==
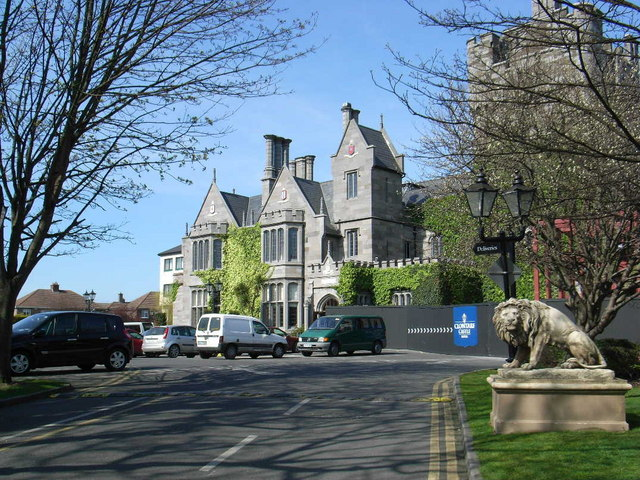
Approach to the hotel

The Castle re-opened to the public as a four-star, 111-room hotel in June 1997. The hotel is now managed by Tifco.

== Building ==
=== Current structure ===
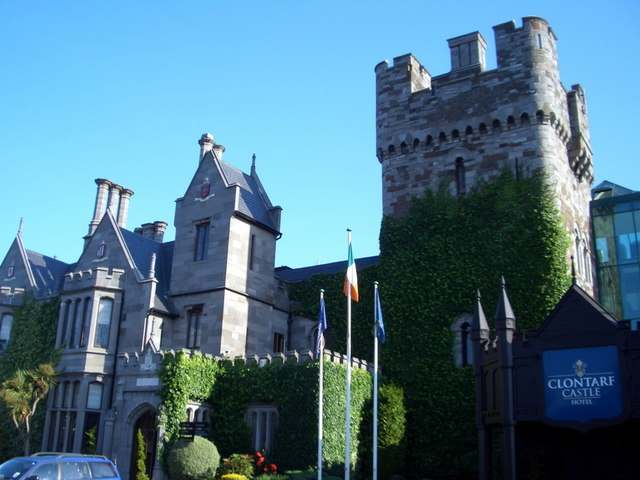
Flags at the hotel

The current building dates to 1837 and was designed by the Irish architect William Vitruvius Morrison for John Edward Venables Vernon, the then owner, when the previous building was found to be unsafe.

As the Clontarf Castle Hotel, it has been significantly enlarged by the addition of modern wings.

Most of the former estate lands are long since sold for housing, but there remains a modest curtilage, with an ornamental gatehouse; most of this is laid out for car parking.

== Art, music and literature ==
Handel was a frequent visitor to the castle during his stay in Dublin for the premiere of Messiah in 1742. The lady of the house at that time, Dorothy Vernon, was from Hanover and "particularly intimate" with the composer, who wrote a piece called Forest Music for her, said to combine German and Irish melodies. The neighbouring area of Dollymount is traditionally said to be named after this lady.

Clontarf Castle was painted by J. M. W. Turner, although he never visited (it is said to be his only Irish subject); his patron Walter Fawkes was married to Maria Sophia Vernon of Clontarf and one of her sketches is believed to have been the basis of the finished watercolour. The work was mislabelled 'Caltarf Castle' and the subject was only positively identified in 1998 – it depicts the castle building previous to the present structure.

Some childhood memories of the castle in the early years of the 20th century appear in Enemies of Promise by the writer Cyril Connolly, whose mother was one of the Vernon family.

The castle is referred to by Phil Lynott of the Irish rock group Thin Lizzy in his song "The Friendly Ranger at Clontarf Castle", the opening track on their 1971 debut album Thin Lizzy.

Before reopening as a hotel in 1997 the castle was for many years a popular cabaret venue; comedians Tom O'Connor and Maureen Potter and accordionist Dermot O'Brien have each released live recordings made there. Dana was crowned Queen of Cabaret there in 1968, prior to winning the 1970 Eurovision Song Contest. The 1997 building works included the construction of a new conference and banqueting centre which hosts conferences and product launches, a regular antiques fair, and is a popular wedding venue. In 2014 Clontarf Castle Hotel was awarded the 2014 Best Hotel Event Venue award at the 2014 Event Industry Awards.

== See also ==
- List of abbeys and priories in Ireland (County Dublin)
- Forbes George Vernon
- John Vernon (of Clontarf)
- Clontarf, Dublin
- Parish of Clontarf (Roman Catholic)
- Church of Ireland Parish of Clontarf

== Sources ==
- D'Alton, John. History of the County of Dublin. Dublin, 1838
- McIntyre, Dennis. The Meadow of the Bull: a History of Clontarf. Future Print, Dublin, 1987.
- 'Vernon of Clontarf Castle' in Burke's Landed Gentry of Ireland (1912) pp. 722–3
- A Study of Vernon and Venables Families and Their Connections
