= St Brendan's parish, Coolock =

Roman Catholic parish, Dublin, Ireland

Coordinates: 53.38823°N 6.20011°W

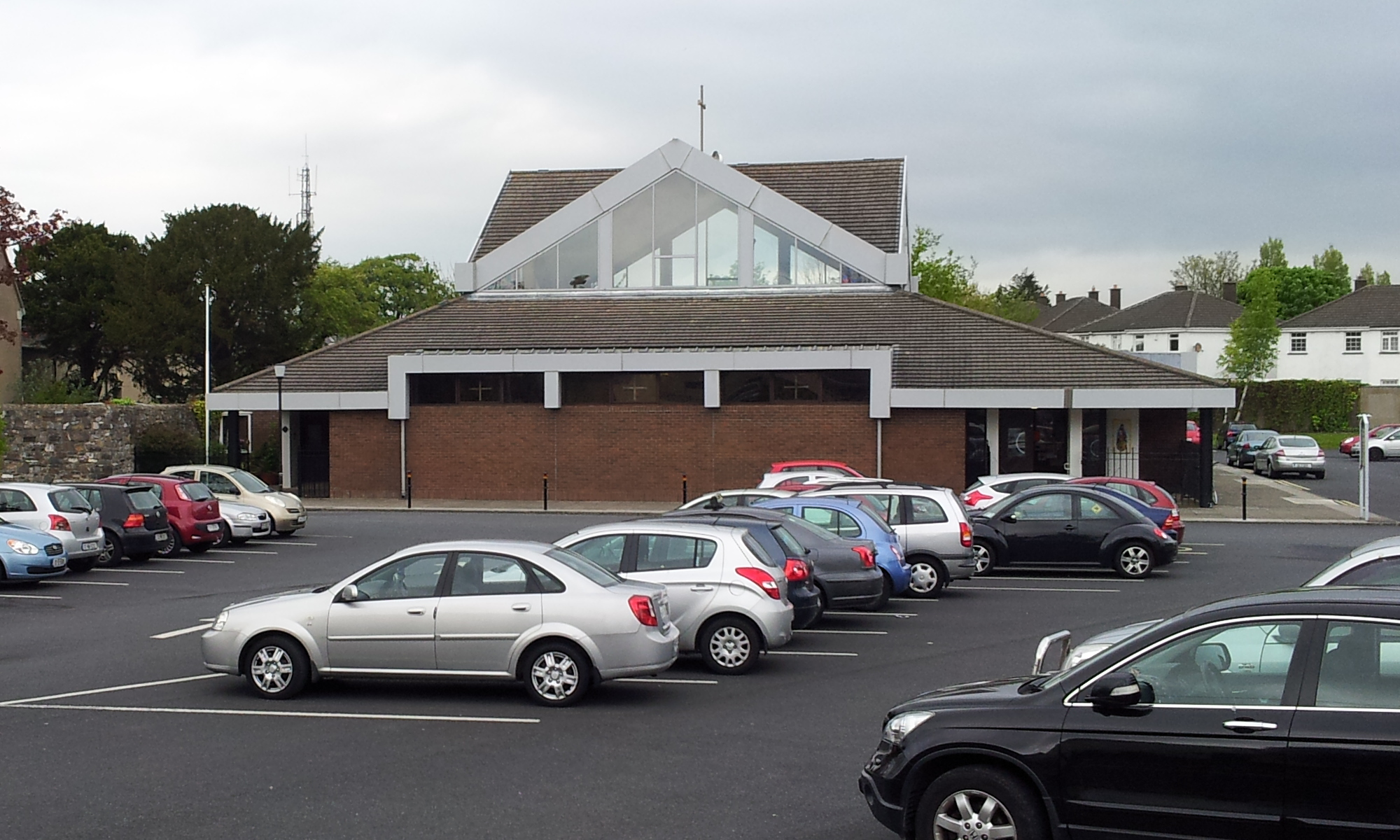
St. Brendan's parish church, Coolock

St Brendan's is a parish in Coolock, Dublin in Ireland that is served by the Church of St Brendan. The parish is in the Fingal South East deanery of the Roman Catholic Archdiocese of Dublin. The parish is based on the civil parish of Coolock. During penal times, it was one of the few functioning Catholic parishes in Dublin.

== History ==
=== Early history ===
The Celtic Church did not utilise parochial structures, being primarily based around monastic settlements, but following restructuring under figures such as St. Malachy, Archbishop of Armagh, and the papal legate Cardinal Paparo in 1152, the Christian Church in Ireland was divided in the 12th century into thirty-eight dioceses, each comprising a number of parishes. The Diocese of Dublin was raised to the status of Archdiocese, with forty parishes, one of which was Coolock.

The boundaries of this ancient parish are best reflected today in those of the civil parish of Coolock and Church of Ireland parish of the same name (now in Union with Raheny). It had 1,199 acres (4.85 km^{2}) across ten townlands, and is believed to have had a sparse population but good agricultural lands. In the early years, it was a dependency of Swords, one of north County Dublin's three major ecclesiastical settlements, with a chapel dedicated to St. Brendan of Clonfert (St. Brendan the Traveller).

Shortly after formation, the Anglo-Norman invasion made changes across the whole Dublin region, and in the Reportorium Viride of John Alen, it is stated that the church at Coolock was at first in the gift of the Baron de Nugent, and later the Priory of Llanthony (near Gloucester), who held the right of presentation until the dissolution of the monasteries by Henry VIII, when the parsonage was granted to Edward Griffin and John Bathe.

=== Anglican foundation ===
Following the break between Henry VIII and the Papacy, the Anglican Churches came into being and from this point – around 1536, when Henry VIII imposed the Act of Supremacy in Ireland – there were two Parishes of Coolock, one in the Roman Catholic Church, one in the Church of Ireland.

The Catholic Church in Ireland came under increasing pressure, and with the assumption of control of properties by the new Church of Ireland, found itself without many places of worship, and with its priests under suspicion. One consequence of this was that it became impossible to continue to operate all the historical parishes, and at the Synod of Leinster at Kilkenny in 1614, many were grouped. It was at this time that the Union Parish of Coolock was formed, combining the existing parishes, of widely differing size and population, of Glasnevin, Clonturk (also known as Drumcondra), Santry, Clontarf, Killester, Raheny, Artaine (or Tartaine) and Coolock itself. To some extent, the distinct identity of the component parishes remained, and there are references to them in documents over the centuries.

=== Union parish to the late 1700s ===
Until the late 17th century, the new extended Parish of Coolock was based at Artaine, notably supported by the Hollywood family, and the Church of St. Brendan at Coolock was allowed to fall into ruin, until a new Church of Ireland building was erected on its site in 1790. In 1630, the Anglican Archbishop Bulkeley noted that the Roman Catholic priest was Father James Drake, based at Artaine Castle, whose brother provided Catholic schooling, and it is believed that Drake led the parish from no later than 1620.

The next priest recorded, after the Cromwellian period and the Restoration, is Richard Cahill, Parish Priest from circa 1680–1720, resident at Artaine, who arranged in 1689 for the building of the first public place of worship within the whole extended parish, a small chapel at Coolock, but who also had to say mass in private houses when anti-Catholic laws were applied more strongly. He appears to have had a colleague, who may also have been his successor, Fr. Cassidy. The next known parish priest was Nicholas Gernon, who departed office in 1733, succeeded by Andrew Tuite, presiding from 1733–1771. Government returns in 1731 note the presence of one resident priest, a chapel at Coolock and several itinerant priests. Tuite was made a canon in 1747 and a report in 1766 noted him as parish priest, with a curate and two chapels. It is not known where the second chapel was but based on areas with and without records of such buildings, Donnelly in 1915 considered Ballymun, then part of Santry as possible; others have suggested Whitehall.

Terence McLoughlin was appointed as parish priest in 1771, holding office until 1785; he had already been made a canon in 1763. During McLoughlin's time in office, the parish centre moved to Coolock, and the first surviving Parochial Registers date from this period. McLoughlin had a curate, William Green, who remained in office after his death, and who was based in Drumcondra.

=== Union parish from 1785 to 1829 ===
In 1785, John Larkin, a canon since 1781, was made parish priest. Both he and his curate died in 1797, the year in which the chapel at Ballymun is recorded as having been redeveloped. Larkin's successor was Patrick Ryan, who held office from 1797–1805. Ryan, made a canon in 1798, was made co-adjutor Bishop of Ferns in 1804, with right of succession, and became bishop there in 1814. He is reported in 1800 as having an income of 110 Irish pounds, and a curate, Fr. Strong.

A nominee for the office of parish priest, Andrew Long, took on its duties on 13 January 1805 and was eventually confirmed in that office, although for a matter of weeks in March and April of that year, another, a Dr. (later Archbishop) Murray, was appointed to the post by the Holy See. Dr. Murray resigned and Dr. Long was formally appointed by the Archbishop of Dublin. Fr. Strong was succeeded as curate in 1808 by a Fr. Ham. Around 1810, Long was asked to take on the role of pro tem Superior and Administrator of the Irish College in Paris, which had been confiscated, along with much other British property following the French Revolution. He remained parish priest but was given an extra curate to support him during this time, this office being filled in succession by priests named Cunningham (1810–1813), Lalor (1813–1814) and Boyle (1814–1839). In 1814, Long was made Archdeacon of Glendalough and left for Paris.

In 1818, the first curate, Fr. Ham died, and was succeeded by Fr. Ryan and Fr. Nugent. Fr. James Harold was appointed as parish administrator, and in 1819, this role was given to the senior curate, Fr. Boyle. Also in 1819, a Carmelite Tertiary monastery was opened in Fairview, and its chapel, known simply as the Monastery Chapel, became the first Catholic place of worship in that area on record, although not strictly a parish facility.

In 1820, the ancient chapel at Coolock still stood, and may have been renovated with a thatched roof.

In 1824, the parish priest returned from France and in 1825, the Union Parish received another place of worship, the first Catholic church at Clontarf for centuries, a chapel largely funded by a legacy of 1,000 Irish pounds left by an Edmund Keary. In 1829, Long was transferred to St. Catherine's, Meath St.

With the appointment of Dr. Long's successor, the Union Parish was redesignated as the Parish of Clontarf, and its continued history is in that article.

=== Parish of Coolock, 1829–1879 ===
Coolock was a quiet part of the Union Parish for some decades, with no new religious developments recorded. Work was carried out, perhaps amounting to a full reconstruction, on the chapel in 1830–1831, as it was deemed dangerous; the nave was extended and a slate roof added.

In 1864, a new chapel was dedicated, again named for St. Brendan, presided over by Fr. Brady, an Administrator; a bell tower was added in 1916 and removed in the 1970s.

In 1879, following the death of the parish priest of the Union Parish of Clontarf in 1878, the Union Parish was divided, and two new Unions created, one designated the Parish of Fairview, comprising the ancient parishes of Drumcondra, Glasnevin, Santry and Artaine, and a new Union Parish of Clontarf, comprising Clontarf, Raheny, Coolock and Killester.

=== Parish of Coolock, 1879–1969 ===
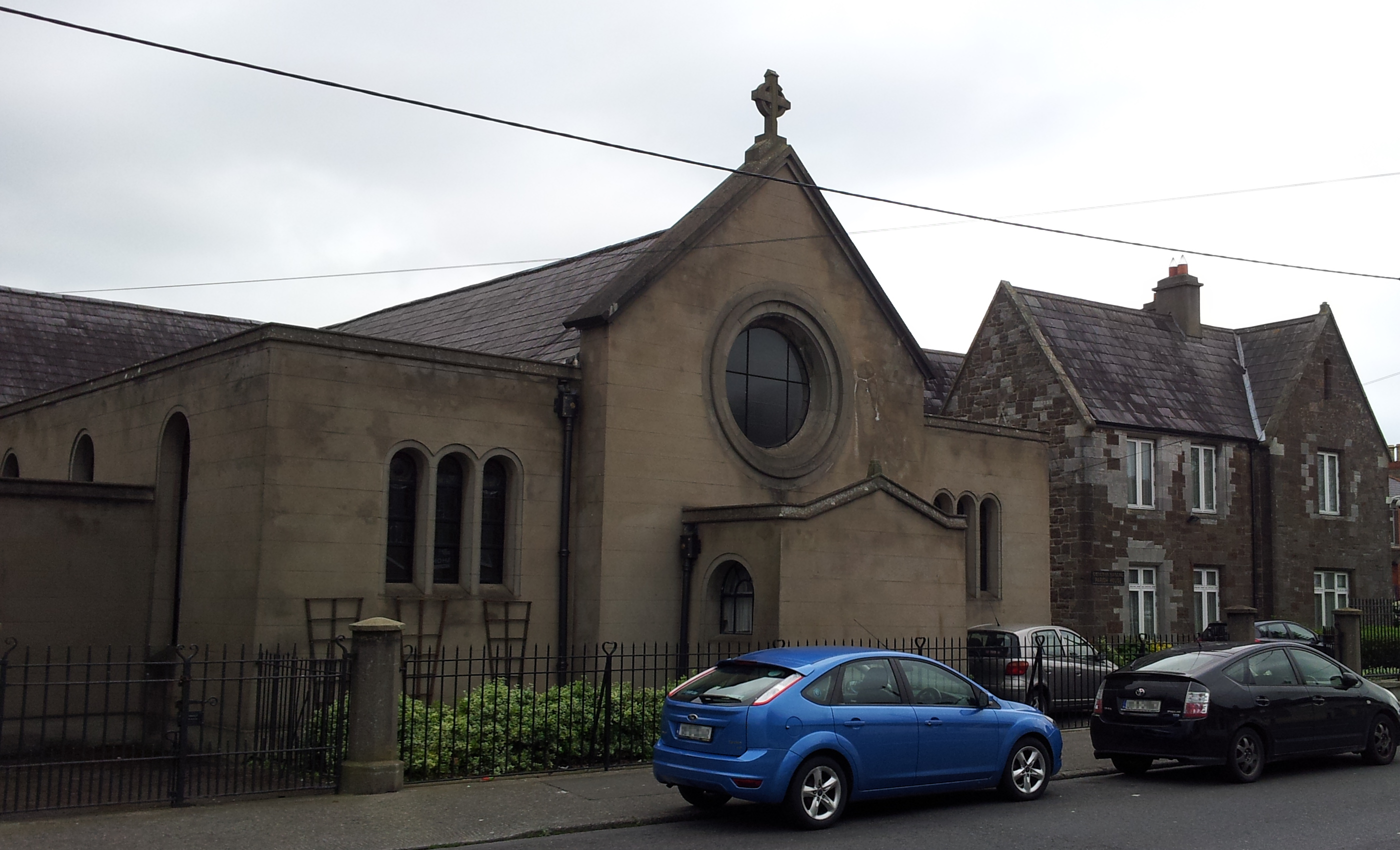
The former parish church in Coolock village, now a community centre and offices

In 1879, the curate in charge of Coolock was T. Kennedy, assisted by a second curate, this being in turn Ferdinand Byrne (1879–1881), Fr. Fee (1881–1885) and Fr. Mulqueen (1885–). While a new church, the newer St. Assam's, had been established in nearby Raheny in 1864, Coolock itself had only the chapel left from penal times.

In 1909, the Union Parish of Clontarf was divided again, and a new Parish of Coolock and Raheny (also including Killester, and the chaplaincy of the Artaine Industrial School) was erected, with the first parish priest of this entity being Patrick Doyle.

In 1955, Raheny and Killester were created as a new union parish, and a Parish of Coolock-Artane was formed.

=== 20th century ===
The parish of Coolock emerged distinctly in 1969.

The present parish church, between the main street of Coolock village and the Malahide Road, was dedicated in 1974, and in 1975, Patrick O'Farrell took over as parish priest, presiding until his death in 1990.

In 1993, the parish was placed in the care of the Marist Fathers, who operate Chanel College in Coolock, and three of their number are now (2007) its clergy. The new management arranged for re-roofing of the modern church, addition of a baptistry, a new presbytery with an oratory and meeting space, and the conversion of the old parish church into a community centre.

== See also ==
- Coolock parish (Church of Ireland)

== Sources ==
- Dublin: Catholic Truth Society, 1915; Donnelly, N. (Canea, Bishop of); Short Histories of Dublin Parishes, Vol. XIV.
