= Barrowhouse, County Laois =

Barrowhouse Teach na Bearú
- Townland
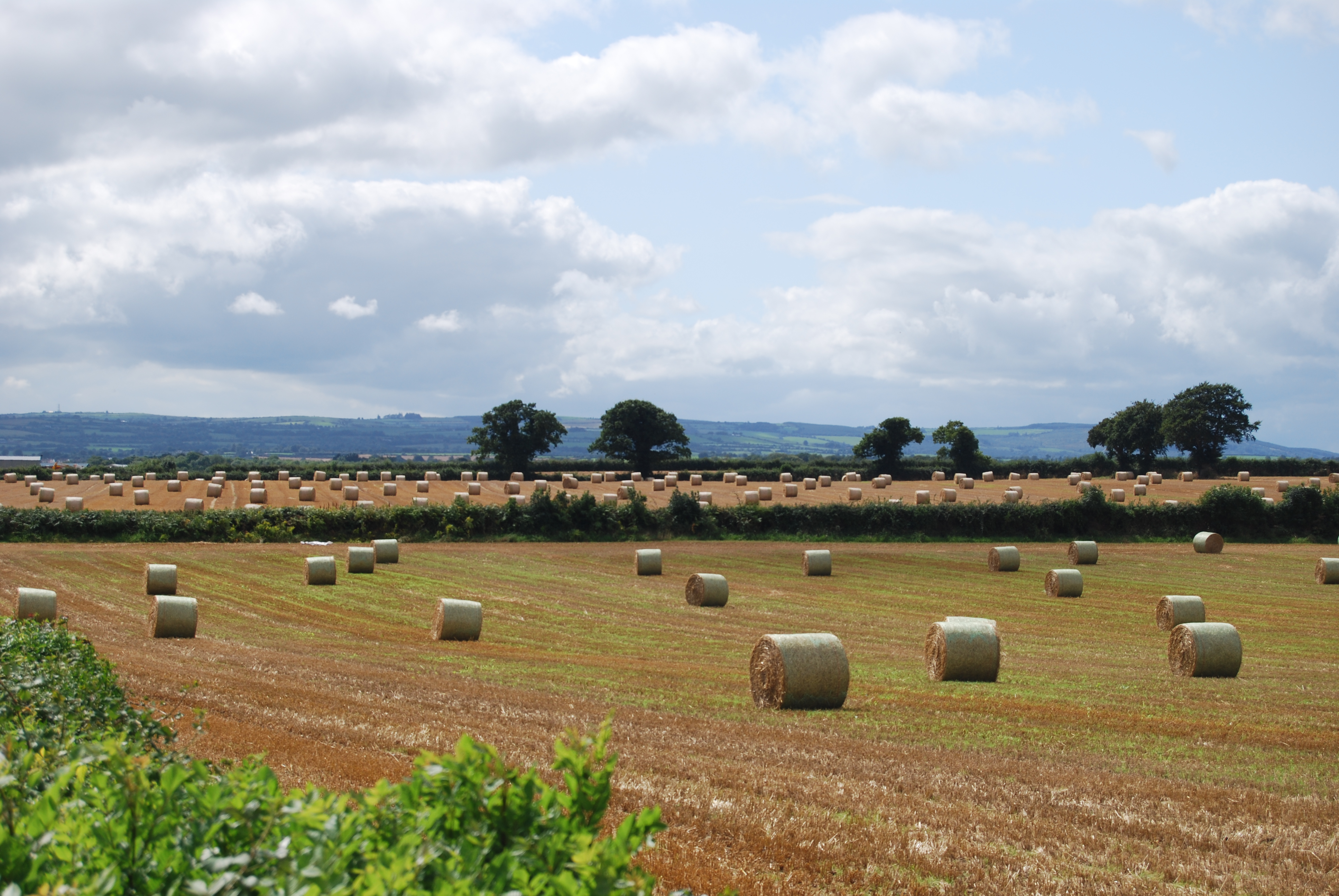
- Fields near Barrowhouse, County Laois

- Location in Ireland
- Coordinates: 52°57′46″N 7°00′00″W
- Country: Ireland
- Province: Leinster
- County: County Laois
- Time zone: UTC+0 (WET)
  - Summer (DST): UTC-1 (IST (WEST))
- Irish Grid Reference: S644885

Barrowhouse (Irish: Teach na Bearú) is a townland in southeast County Laois in Ireland. Barrowhouse is located close to the County Kildare border and the town of Athy. The Barrowhouse area is the only part of County Laois in the Athy Roman Catholic parish and the Dublin R.C. Diocese. Barrowhouse gets its name as the River Barrow flows at the areas eastern border with Kildare.

== History ==
=== Early history ===
Barrowhouse, as it is known today, was originally two regions, Fasaghreban and Feranclan-ui-donal. One of the most significant landmarks in the Barrowhouse area is Dunbrin Fort, which is reputed to have been a Danish station, because of coins found there.

=== Built heritage ===
Barrowhouse has a Roman Catholic church called St. Marys built in 1831 at the time of the lifting of the penal laws. The Church of St Mary's, the only Chapel of Ease within the parish of St Michael's, Athy, is reputed to have been built in the 1820s on a site donated by a Miss Fennell who lived in a thatched cottage to the left of the church.

St Mary's, built in anticipation of the granting of Catholic emancipation, was the post penal law replacement for a church at Tankardstown which in pre-reformation days served as the local church for the people of Barrowhouse and Tankardstown. In Tankardstown graveyard today there can still be found some remains of this more ancient church.

The local primary school, which has been in existence since 1830, is officially known as Shanganamore National School and locally known as Barrowhouse National School. Pupils and teachers were relocated to the current school in 1999 after 169 years in the old school. The old school is now used as a community hall. As of 2011, Shanganamore National School had an enrollment of 80 pupils.

Kilmoroney House is a ruined house which is visible from the R417 road from Athy to Carlow. This house was once the home of the Weldon family. The Weldons came to Ireland around 1600 and acquired estates in Counties Laois and Kildare. It is through John Weldon of St. John's Bower, Athy, County Kildare that the direct line of the Weldon family in Kildare can be traced. In 1613, John Weldon was MP for Athy and in 1624 High Sheriff of County Kildare. The family papers in the National Archives show the Weldon family's social contacts in the early years of the 20th century through correspondence with people such as Winston Churchill and Dr. Douglas Hyde. Members of the family served the British military in India, Africa and the Far East. Captain George Anthony Weldon of the Royal Dublin Fusiliers was killed at Glencoe in October 1899 during the Boer War. Another member of the family, Major Arthur Stewart Weldon, served in South Africa and the First World War and was killed in action in March 1917. His brother-in-law Colonel Croshaw died of wounds received in the Great War in September 1917. The old British Legion Hall in Naas (now the Scout Den) was dedicated to their memory. The last of the male line of Weldons to live at Kilmorony was Sir Anthony Arthur Weldon who became the sixth Baronet of Kilmorony on the death of his father in 1900. Anthony Weldon died in 1917 as a result of shell shock received while fighting in France. The main entrance to the Kilmorony estate was on the Athy-Carlow road but has been obscured by road widening. The entrance avenue to Kilmorony House crossed over the Barrow Navigational Canal and the River Barrow. Referred to as "Sportland" on the 1783 Taylor map of Kildare, Kilmorony was a Georgian house built some time after 1752 (it does not appear on the Noble and Keenan Map of 1752). The main block was of two stories over a basement of five bays and a balustraded roof parapet and a lower two-story wing of four bays. The house was dismantled in the late 1930s. The coach house of Kilmorony has survived and is now a private dwelling.

=== 20th century ===
On 16 May 1921, two of a group of eight Irish Republican Army volunteers were shot dead during an ambush on the Black and Tans, who regularly passed through the area going to Ballylynan. Today, the area is marked with a memorial to the deceased, William Connors and James Lacey. Barrowhouse also includes the ruins of Kilmorony House. There was once a horse racing course in Kilmorony but this has been gone for over 100 years. There is also a ruin of a Roman Catholic church and graveyard in Tankardstown. Barrowhouse was one of the last remaining Irish speaking areas in the region with the language dying out 200 years ago.

== Sport ==
The local Gaelic Athletic Association club is Barrowhouse GAA. Soccer is also played in Barrowhouse by St. Marys. Barrowhouse also had an Athletics club but this disbanded in the late seventies/ early eighties. Cricket was played in the area in the 1800s.

== See also ==
- List of towns and villages in Ireland
