= Clontarf parish (Church of Ireland) =

Parish in Dublin, Ireland

Coordinates: 53°21′51.2″N 6°12′8.8″W

The parish church of St John the Baptist, Seafield Road, Clontarf

The Parish of St. John the Baptist, the Church of Ireland Parish of Clontarf, Dublin is a religious community located on the north shore of Dublin Bay, bounded by the Parishes of North Strand to the west, Coolock to the north, and Raheny to the east (the latter two are in a Union).

The Parish Church is situated on Seafield Road, approximately 2 1/2 miles (4.0 km) from the churches of each of the adjoining parishes. It was built in 1866 to replace an earlier church some 200 metres away on Castle Avenue, on the edge of the grounds of Clontarf Castle.

== The early days ==
The first church in Clontarf was reputedly founded by the great Abbot of Bangor, St. Comgall, as part of Christian development through north Dublin, perhaps from a base at St. Mobhi's Church at Glasnevin. St. Comgall became the Patron of Clontarf and remained so until replaced by St. John the Baptist when the Parish came under the control of the Knights of St. John of Jerusalem in the 14th century.

Clontarf was a central location of the Battle of Clontarf in 1014, when Brian Boroimhe (Boru) defeated the Vikings and reduced their power in Ireland, although they retained control of Dublin city and much of the surrounding land. The remains of the well supposed to have been used by Brian Boru can still be seen on Castle Avenue, just under 500 meters from the Parish Church. The history of Clontarf itself, however, goes back much further.

== The Middle Ages ==
In the reign of Henry II, the lands of Clontarf passed to the Knights Templar, an arm of the Church, and in turn, on the suppression of the Knights Templar in 1307, it became a preceptory of the Knights Hospitallers of St. John of Jerusalem, which it remained until their disbandment in 1542, when the last Prior, Sir John Rawson, was created Viscount Clontarf.

An early church had existed on the Castle Avenue site and this was rebuilt in 1609, the new building remaining the Parish Church for over 250 years, serving Clontarf and later also the neighbouring Parish of St. Brigid, Killester, which was amalgamated with Clontarf in 1686. In 1659, the population of Clontarf was 79 and of Killester 32.

== The nineteenth century ==
A key arrival in the Parish was Sir Benjamin Lee Guinness, the grandson of Arthur Guinness, and his partner in running the brewery, who purchased lands in Clontarf and Raheny to form St. Anne's Estate (the remnants of which now comprise Saint Anne's Park). He was married to his cousin Elizabeth and all their children were baptised in Clontarf Parish Church.

In 1872 Arthur (by then Sir Arthur) was elected to the Select Vestry of the Parish but, in a letter from Ashford Castle, declined the offer on the grounds of frequent absences from the parish. He funded the building of All Saints Church, Raheny. Benjamin's cousin Dr. Arthur Grattan Guinness practised and lived in the parish and most of his children were baptised in the church. In 1872 he was appointed Officer of Health for the parish jointly with James Colville.

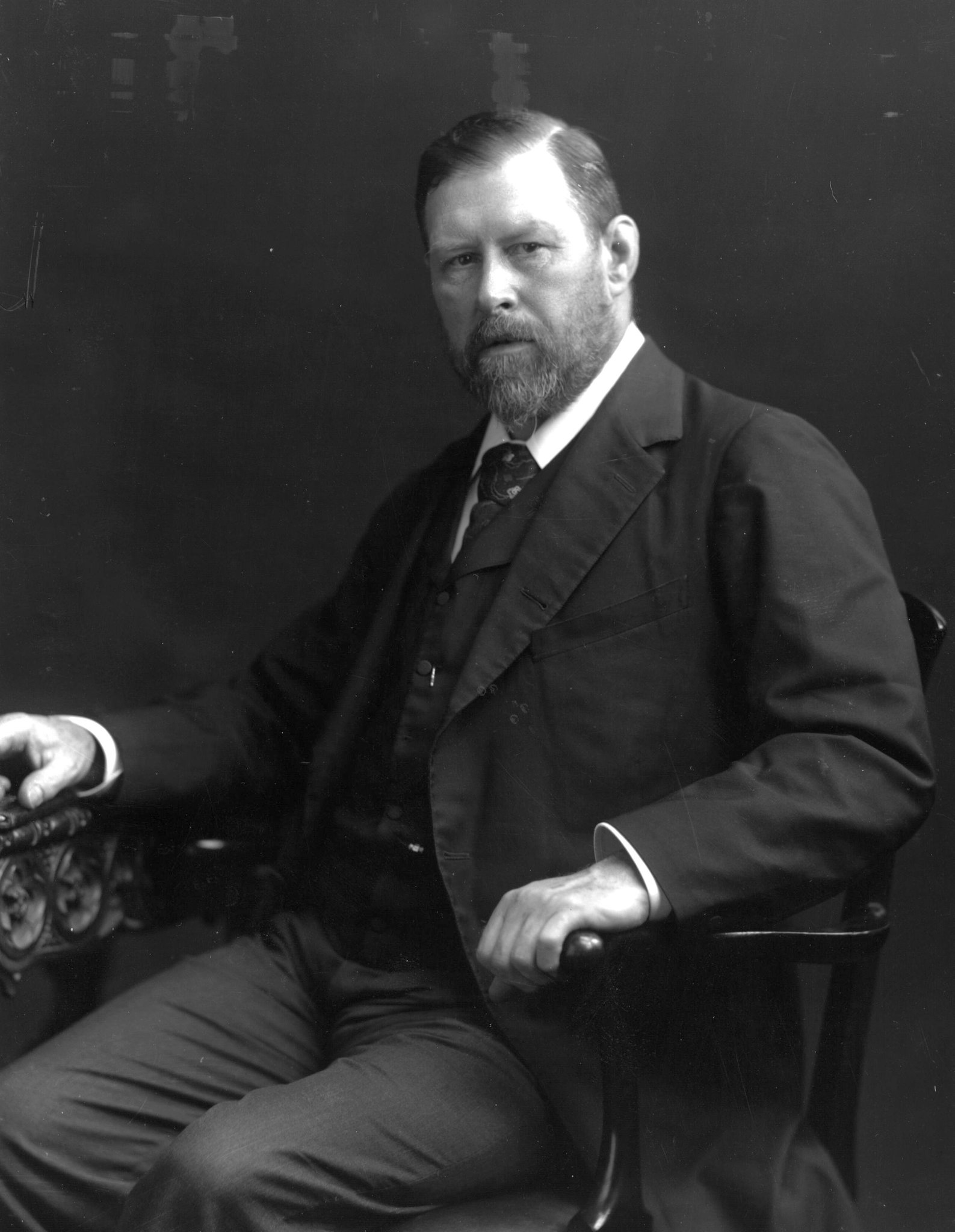
Bram Stoker

On 30 December 1847 Abraham, son of Abraham and Charlotte Matilda Stoker of The Crescent, Clontarf, was baptised by Rev. Edward, a visiting clergyman from the Diocese of Ossory. Bram Stoker, as he became known, was the creator of the Dracula stories and is commemorated today in the Bram Stoker Museum in Westwood Club near the Crescent. Bram's family later moved to Artane Lodge but his younger siblings were also baptised in Clontarf.

The church, meanwhile, was becoming too small for its growing congregations, especially in the summer. Plans were developed in 1859 by Trustees including Mr. John E.V. Vernon of Clontarf Castle and substantial funding secured to build a second church at the Dollymount end of the parish. These plans were brought to an advanced stage, with an architect appointed and a site leased, despite the reservations of the Rector, Rev. William Kempston, who believed that the existing church was adequate and advised the Archbishop of his views. The Archbishop, whose permission was required for the building, told the Trustees that permission would not be given against the wishes of the Rector and the project was abandoned.

In 1862, Mr. Kempston left the Parish and was replaced by Rev. James Pratt. New plans were then developed with his co-operation for a new and larger church on a site close to the existing church. The foundation stone was laid by Mr. Vernon with great ceremony on 9 August 1864 and the church was completed over the next two years. The new church was consecrated by the Archbishop of Dublin at a service on 14 May 1866 and remains in use to this day. The church was originally built without a chancel and this was added in 1899.

== The twentieth century ==
The First World War saw many of the parishioners joining up to fight and these were commemorated by an illuminated scroll in the church and a War Memorial erected in the grounds.

In 1916, the fiftieth Anniversary of the building of the Church was celebrated at a special service on 14 May at which the Archbishop, Dr. Bernard, preached.

The 1930s, 1940s, and 1950s saw a building boom in the area and Clontarf grew to be one of the biggest parishes in the Church of Ireland. Greenlanes School, which had started in 1854 and had been located for most of its life in the Parish Hall on Seafield Road, about 200 metres from the Church, grew so much that a new school had to be built on a new site at Seafield Avenue and this was opened in 1952. The pace of growth was so rapid that by the time the new school was opened, it was too small and a further classroom was added and opened the following year.

The centenary of the Church was celebrated in 1966 with a programme of religious and social activities aimed at all age groups.

== The twenty-first century ==
New Parish Centre under construction

The beginning of the new millennium was marked by the decision of the Select Vestry to dispose of the Parish Hall which had served the parish for well over a hundred years but had become a major maintenance burden. A new Parish Centre was completed in 2007, in the grounds of the church.

== Curates, rectors, and incumbents ==
=== Impropriate Curates ===
(Definition - Perpetual (or Impropriate) Curate : Clergyman in charge of a benefice in which all the tithes were held by someone else who could be a layman or another clergyman, for example the Archdeacon of Dublin. This was a permanent appointment.)

- 1546 John Quyn
- 1591 William Savage also Curate Drumcondra and Killester
- 1615 Simon Thelwell also Curate Drumcondra
- 1630 Richard St. Laurence
- 1637 Randolphe Dymocke; still Curate in 1639, as also of Balgriffin, St. Dolough's and Portmarnock.
- 1642 William Tedder : licensed 1 July 1642; appears Vicar of Garristown and Ballymadun during the rebellion of 1641 and lost property worth £52.
- 1643 Hugh Morrison: licensed 10 July 1643.

=== Rectors ===
(Definition – Rector : Parish Clergyman who received the whole tithes of the Parish; after Disestablishment usually referred to as Incumbent.)

1670-80 Henry Brereton

1680-13 Adam Ussher : collated 8 July 1680.

1713-66 Frederick Ussher : presented by the Crown 8 June 1713.

1766-11 John Ussher : instituted 21 May 1766.

1811-29 Charles Mulloy : presented by the Crown 4 February.; instituted 1 March 1811.

1830-40 William Handcock : instituted 18 February 1830.

1840-41 Thomas Packenham Huddart : instituted 1 December 1840.

1841-54 James Reid : instituted 11 August 1840.

1854-62 William Augustus Kempston : instituted 1 November 1854.

1862-75 James Pratt : instituted 21 May 1862.

=== Incumbents ===
1875-93 MacNevin Bradshaw : instituted 6 October 1875.

1894-04 Frederick William Mervyn : instituted 5 January 1894.

1904-36 John Connell : instituted 2 March 1904.

1936-62 John Bourke Neligan : instituted 22 May 1936.

1962-89 Robert George McCollum : instituted 17 December 1962.

1990-01 Thomas Haskins : instituted 23 March 1990.

2003-12 Derek Connor Sargent : instituted 25 July 2003.

2013 - E.C. Lesley Robinson: instituted 20 September 2013

=== Curates ===
- 1630 Christopher Cuiston
- 1645 Laurence Wogan : licensed 16 October 1645.
- 1733 John Phipps : licensed 27 December 1733
- 1743-5 Adam Ussher : 'Minister of Clontarf, died of a fever and pleurisy on Sunday morning' (The Dublin Gazette, 10 September 1745)
- 1758 Robert Shenton : appointed Curate of Killester by the Dean and Chapter of Christ Church.
- 1779-81 William Montgomery : licensed 1 June 1779.
- 1799 John Bayly : appointed Curate of Killester by the Dean and Chapter of Christ Church 11 May 1799.
- 1808 John Armstrong Coughlan : licensed 22 October 1808.
- 1841 Augustus William West : licensed 13 January 1841.
- 1843 William Gilbert Ormsby.
- 1844-5 Christopher Henry Gould Butson.
- 1846 William FitzGerald.
- 1846-7 Edward Gabbett : licensed 8 April 1846.
- 1864 John Crawford : licensed 10 June 1864.
- 1870 Sidney Leslie Cousins : appointed 22 September 1870
- 1871 Robert Wyndham Guinness : licensed 8 December 1870.
- 1874-6 Peter Henry Schoales : licensed 5 August 1874.
- 1876 John Galloway Garrett : licensed 1 November 1876.
- 1881 James Joseph Woodroofe : licensed 2 February 1881.
- 1885 George Benjamin Taylor : licensed 30 September 1885.
- 1888 Samuel Russell McGee : licensed 10 September 1888.
- 1894 Henry Brodie Good : licensed 12 July 1894.
- 1896-03 Richard Henry Fawcett : licensed 30 September 1886.
- 1904-9 John George Donaldson Pyper : licensed 4 March 1904.
- 1909-12 Frederick McConnell : licensed 13 October 1909.
- 1912-23 Josiah Francis Shearman : licensed 10 February 1912.
- 1924-9 Charles John Tyndall : licensed 24 June 1924.
- 1929-32 John Bourke Neligan : licensed 5 October 1930.
- 1932-4 Edward Francis Butler Moore : licensed 31 December 1932.
- 1934-8 Matthew Thomas Porteus : licensed 1 October 1934.
- 1939-41 Graham Ronald McCollum : licensed 16 March 1939.
- 1941-4 William Warburton Lloyd Rooke : licensed 8 April 1941.
- 1944-9 Richard William Maurice Wynne : licensed 15 October 1944.
- 1949-53 Robert Denholm Moore : licensed 1 August 1949.
- 1953-57 Stanley Pettigrew : licensed 24 September 1953.
- 1957-60 Allen James Nelson : licensed 24 October 1957.
- 1961-4 Richard St. Lawrence Broadberry : licensed 5 October 1961.
- 1966-70 Donald William McClatchie : licensed 26 June 1966.
- 1970-73 Michael Alistair Graham : licensed 5 July 1970.
- 1974-6 Thomas Andrew Hayden Foster : licensed 9 June 1974.
- 1978-80 David Trevor Muir : licensed 25 June 1978.

== Sources ==
Representative Church Body Library

- Clontarf Parish Registers of Baptisms (from 1808 to 1914), Marriages (from 1812 to 1914) and Burials (from 1812 to 1875).
- Clontarf Parish Minute Books from 1815.

Publications

- H.M.Ecclesiastical Commissioners (Ireland), fourth Report on Ecclesiastical Revenue and Patronage. London 1838.
- Leslie, J.B.ed. (updated by Wallace, W.J.R.), Clergy of Dublin and Glendalough, Dublin 2001.
- Lewis, Samuel, A Topographical Dictionary of Ireland, London 1837.
- Maxwell, Lauren, My Parish Church – A History, unpublished Transition Year Project Essay, 2006.
- Mulally, Frederic, The Silver Salver – The story of the Guinness Family, London, 1981.
- Smyth, Mary M., "Christianity in Clontarf – a brief historical sketch" Centenary of Clontarf Parish Church, Dublin 1966.
- Wilson, Derek, Dark and Light – The story of the Guinness Family, London 1998.

Extract from "Clergy of Dublin and Glendalough"

Clontarf

"The Parish belonged to the Hospitallers of Kilmainham in the Middle Ages. The Parish or Chapel of Killester was joined to it from the sixteenth Century. A new church was built in 1609. The presentation was in the gift of the Crown. The present church, named like its predecessor in honour of St. John the Baptist, was consecrated on 14 May 1866."
