= Kilmead =

Village in County Kildare, Ireland

Kilmead Irish: Cill Míde
- Village
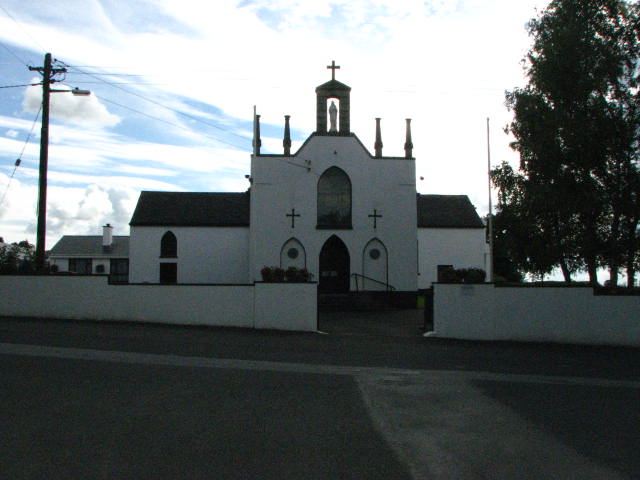
- Saint Ita's church, Kilmead

- Location in Ireland
- Coordinates: 53°02′03″N 6°53′52″W
- Country: Ireland
- Province: Leinster
- County: County Kildare

Population (2016)
  - Total: 309
- Time zone: UTC+0 (WET)
  - Summer (DST): UTC-1 (IST (WEST))
- Irish Grid Reference: S737987

Kilmead (Irish: Cill Míde), known for census purposes as Kilmeade, is a small village in County Kildare, Ireland. It is 7 kilometres (4 mi) north-east of Athy, on the R418 road.

== History ==
National monuments in the area include the "Rath of Mullaghmast" and Kilkea Castle, the ancestral home of the Fitzgeralds. The name "Kilmead" is believed to be derived from a term meaning "middle church". The lands of Kilmead were in the possession of the Fitzgerald family until the rebellion of Silken Thomas in 1534.

Saint Ita's Catholic church in Kilmead is dated to 1798.

== Public transport ==
Route 817, operated by Bus Éireann on behalf of the National Transport Authority, is the main bus route serving the village, providing a daily service to and from Athy, Dublin and other locations. Bus Éireann route 130 also serves Kilmead (once a day Mondays to Fridays inclusive), before continuing to Kilcullen, Naas and Dublin. South Kildare Community Transport operate a twice-a-day route Mondays to Fridays inclusive into Athy. The nearest train station is Athy railway station.

== See also ==
- List of towns and villages in Ireland
