= Killester =

Suburb of Dublin, Ireland

Killester Cill Easra (Irish)
- Suburb
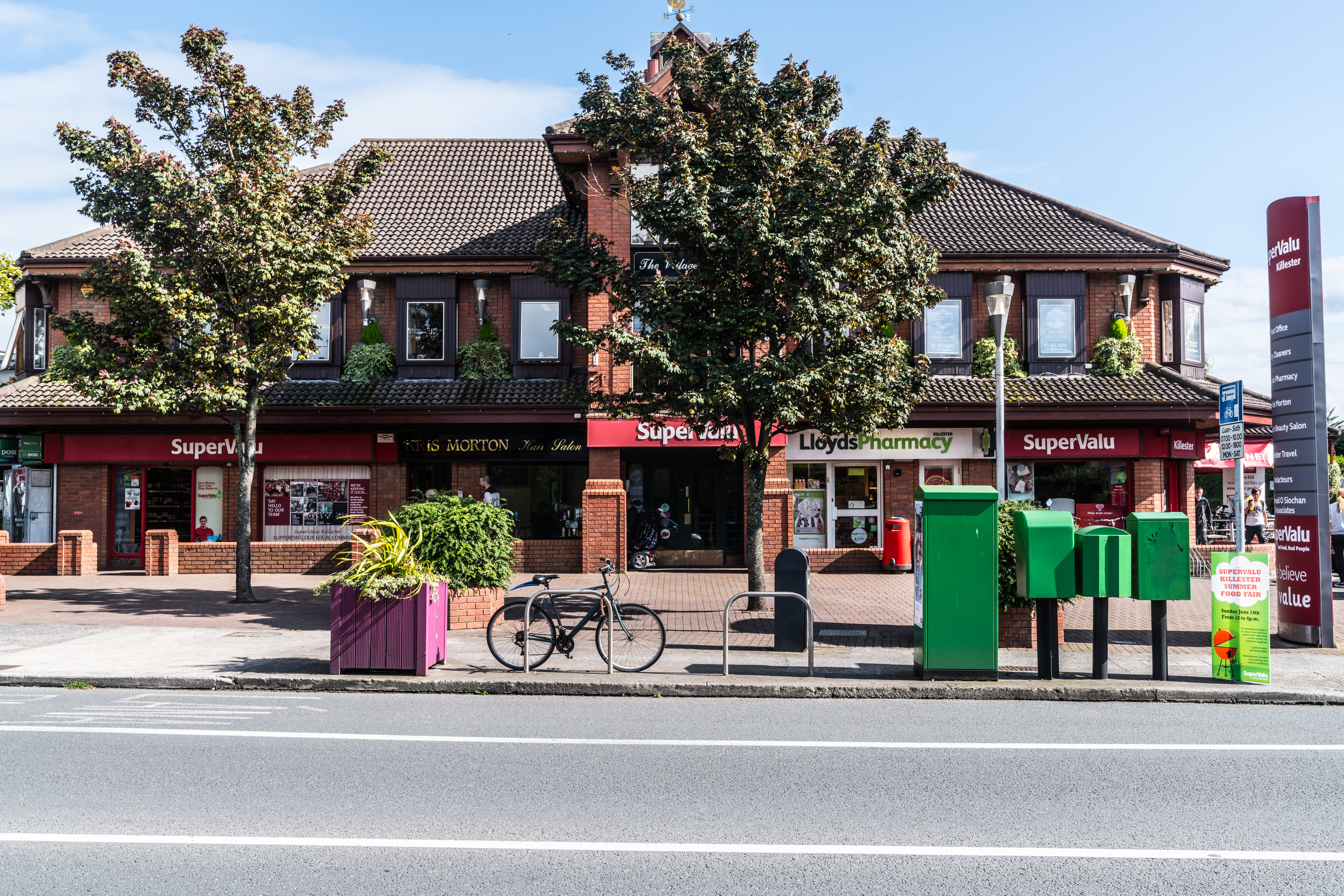
- Shops in central Killester

- Location in Dublin
- Country: Ireland
- Province: Leinster
- County: Dublin
- Council: Dublin City Council
- Dáil Éireann: Dublin Bay North
- European Parliament: Dublin
- Elevation: 24 m (79 ft)
- Time zone: UTC±0 (WET)
  - Summer (DST): UTC+1 (IST)
- Eircode: D03, D05
- Area codes: +353(0)1

Killester (Irish: Cill Easra) is a small residential suburb of Dublin, Ireland on the Northside of the city in the Dublin 3 and Dublin 5 postal districts. It was the site of a church and convent or monastery centuries ago, and later a small village developed. In 1922, a settlement for ex-servicemen and their families was established. Over time the area grew with suburban housing. The local parish church has for many years hosted a relic of St Brigid.

Killester is also a civil parish in the ancient barony of Coolock.

== Location and access ==
Killester is located between Clontarf, Donnycarney, Raheny and Artane, on the Northside of Dublin. It is one of the smaller suburbs, with the entire civil parish just 228 acres in size. The village centre is on the Howth Road, about 5 kilometres from Dublin city centre, and the bulk of the area lies between the Howth and Malahide Roads, and Brookwood Avenue.

Killester has a rail station on the DART line (also on the Dublin-Belfast line but with no stopping of inter-city trains), and Dublin Bus routes H1, H2, H3, and 42A connect the district to the city centre and other suburbs to the east and north. The original Killester railway station opened on 1 October 1845 but closed after two years, re-opening on a new site about 200 m (656 ft) further north in 1923.

== History ==
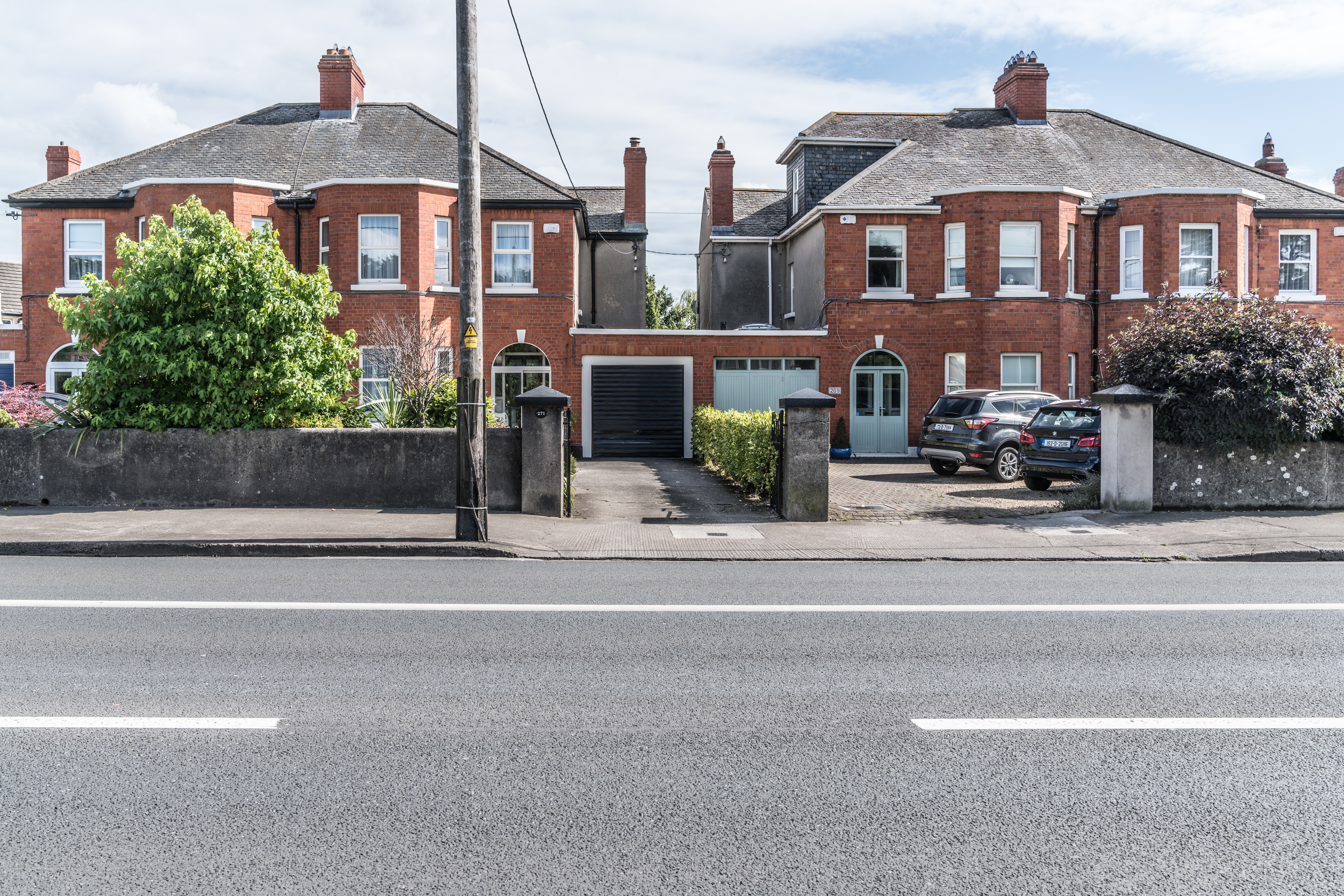
Edwardian-era houses in Killester, Dublin D05

Killester has been noted in city and church records going back many centuries, with variant spellings such as "Killtrsta" (St. Laurence O'Toole), "Quillestra" and "Kylestre", and was the site of both an early church and a convent or monastery. The name probably means "Church of (St) Stra". The ruins of a religious building can still be seen, and nearby there is a modern convent, with a school.

The manor of Killester was given to one Adrian le Brun in the twelfth century. In the seventeenth century, it was owned by the White family, from whom it passed by inheritance to the St Lawrence family, Barons and later Earls of Howth.

In the seventeenth century, it went to the Cootes, a branch of the family of the Earls of Mountrath. Killester house was constructed at this time for Chidley Coote to a design tentatively attributed to Thomas Burgh. Later the house was rebuilt and embellished in a Georgian manner when the house was at that stage owned by Sir William Gleadowe-Newcomen, 1st Baronet from around 1778 having leased it from Lord Howth. It was later inherited by his son Thomas Gleadowe-Newcomen, 2nd Viscount Newcomen until the collapse of Newcomen Bank precipitated his suicide in 1825.

By the 1830s the population was around 110, and there were several large houses, the principal being Killester House, others being Maryville, Woodville, Hollybrook House, Hollybrook Park and Killester Lodge.

Killester House finally burned down in a fire in 1919 and was later demolished by Dublin Corporation with many of the finer interior and exterior items moving to Howth Castle including the granite gate pillars which now form the rear entrance on Carrickbrack Road to Old Castle Avenue.

=== Housing for ex-soldiers and sailors ===
Killester, a primarily residential area, is perhaps best known for its association with World War I veterans who were settled there from early 1922 onwards, in a development managed by the Irish Sailors' and Soldiers' Land Trust from 1925 onwards, when the Trust's Dublin office opened. The Trust, created in 1924, catered for the housing needs of ex-servicemen at the time, and took responsibility for 2,700 homes built in Ireland from 1919 to 1934 to house the men who fought in World War I. The Killester scheme was one of many started in answer to the early-20th-century housing crisis and worsening housing conditions of the working classes at the time; the 1914 "Housing Enquiry" found that 14,000 homes were needed to cater for the working classes at a cost of 3.5 million pounds.

==== Origins ====
Developer Henry McLoughlin, who was leader of both the British Army-supporting Irish Recruiting Council and the Dublin Relief Committee, purchased 40 acres of land in the Killester area in 1916 and made them available to the relief committee; their use as a model farm was explored in 1917, and lasted two years. After the end of the war, the lands were offered to Dublin Corporation for housing but when this did not proceed, McLoughlin, who then headed Lord French's Irish Demobilisation Committee, gifted them to the Local Government Board for Ireland (LGB), which had as key tasks the provision of houses for both labourers and ex-servicemen and their families. The operational head of the Irish LGB, Henry Robinson, took a personal interest in the site, and in late 1920 sought funding for site clearance.

==== Development ====
A budget of 10,000 pounds was made available to the LGB in December 1920 and work began under an ex-Royal Engineer colonel and a team of approximately 180 ex-servicemen, first building roads, and then, from February 1921, laying foundations and drains. For reasons of both speed and economy, the LGB proposed to use an Irish company's new "semi-permanent" building system, branded "Orion" and patented; one of the directors of this company was the same Henry McLoughlin who had donated the land. The system had been deployed in nearby Clontarf, with 24 homes built on Victoria Road and taken on by the government. Ireland's Board of Works had doubts about the new system, and it was eventually not used in Killester. Instead a planned 247 dwelling houses were made with concrete blocks. The "Killester Garden Village "colony" was laid out according to "garden suburb" principles, with the plans approved of by both the Treasury in Ireland and leading town planner Patrick Abercrombie.

==== Design ====
The estate was laid out at a low density, with winding streets and breaks for green space and amenities, and with existing trees retained to a large degree. All initial housing was single-storey, and there were three standard designs. 32 were detached, with 5 rooms, while the remainder were semi-detached. However, in the event, housing was distributed on a first-come first-served basis, and ranks were mixed in all areas. As now, higher income rather than rank resulted in detached, and better located, houses being officer occupied. Over 170 of the semi-detached or terraced houses had 4 rooms, while 38 had 3 rooms. The LGB expected the bungalows to cost between 700 and 900 pounds each, but the average cost ended up around 1,500 pounds, which contributed to the original contract being closed and re-tendered. A further factor in the re-tendering was the transfer of responsibility for the development to the Office of Public Works, which was already responsible for all other veterans' housing projects in Ireland. The 247 houses were completed by August 1923.

42 further houses were later added. The high costs led to high rents, and also created an additional challenge when the British Government looked to transfer the housing of ex-servicement to the new Irish Government.

==== Rent backlash ====
The houses began to be occupied by May 1922, and in the initial years after occupation, the ISSLT faced a backlash over rent prices, resulting eventually in a rent strike. The dwellings were leased with rents on a sliding scale, with the aim of the individual eventually owning their home, i.e.: the cost of rent was based on the amount of income an individual made. However despite this, on average a dwelling cost around 1500 pounds. The strike saw a decrease in the rent prices, however, further problems arose between the Trust and occupiers. In 1925, an investigation revealed that rents were higher than necessary to keep the organisation afloat. Rents were reduced again and with the reduction, but this prevented the Trust from building up capital for major maintenance and future developments.

==== Infrastructure ====
The area became well-established over time, with the development boasting its own water supply tower, and access improved, to both the city and neighbouring towns. This was particularly evident with the opening of Killester railway station in 1923. Further, Killester acquired a "special" bus route for the area, operated by “The Contemptible Omnibus Company”.

== Amenities ==
Killester has a central shopping plaza on Howth Road, with a supermarket, pub, chipper, Chinese takeaway, florists, estate agents, hardware, pharmacy, doctor, dentist, florists, solicitors' offices, and other shops. The local bank branch closed in October 2021 and was replaced by a pizza restaurant. There is also a service station towards the eastern end of the area.

St. Anne's Park lies just beyond Killester on the Raheny / Clontarf side, and there are a number of small green spaces in the area.

== Education ==
The primary schools in the area are St Brigid's national schools, both under Catholic patronage: on Howth Road for boys, and on St Brigid's Road for girls. Killester/Clontarf/Raheny Educate Together is located at St Peter's College. Some children also attend Greenlanes (Church of Ireland/multi-denominational) and Belgrove (Catholic) national schools in Clontarf. Local secondary schools include St Mary's in northern Killester and St Paul's College, Raheny, right on the border of the district. Many children from the area also attend secondary schools in neighbouring districts and some commute to schools in the city centre. Killester is also the site of a third-level institution, Killester College of Further Education, formerly known as St Peter's College.

== Religion ==
Today there is a Roman Catholic Parish of Killester. The current Roman Catholic church, on Howth Road, opposite St. Brigid's National School, was constructed from 1924, and was consecrated in 1926. For many years, it was the parish church for the combined parish of Killester and Raheny. It was extended in 1952. Alongside the church is a parish resource centre, opened in the autumn of 2004, with multiple rooms and a coffee shop overlooking the church's peace garden. Notably, the church holds a reputed relic of St. Brigid, one of Ireland's three patron saints; a fragment of her cheekbone was brought from Portugal, where her skull is stored, in 1928. The church's reliquary was stolen in 2012 but the relic was not in it at the time.

The old Parish of Killester in the Church of Ireland (the Parish of St. Brigid) was merged with Clontarf Parish in 1686 (the parish church is located on Seafield Road, Clontarf), and the combined entity still serves the Anglican communities of both areas. A new parish centre was built beside the parish church in the 2000s, to serve the needs of parishioners and, as capacity allows, the wider community of all faiths.

== Sport ==
The local football (soccer) club is Killester Donnycarney F.C., who play in the Leinster Senior League. The local basketball club is Killester. The local rugby, cricket & hockey clubs are Clontarf. The local GAA club is Craobh Chiaráin CLG, based at Parnell Park.

== Representation and governance ==
Killester lies within the Clontarf local electoral area, and the Dublin Bay North national constituency. Richard Bruton is the TD for the area.

== Notable residents ==
- Gabriel Byrne, actor
- Brian Fenton, Gaelic footballer who bought a house in Killester
- Paul Harrington, musician, Eurovision winner
- Cian Healy, rugby union player, including at international level
- Marty Whelan, DJ and presenter, born in Killester
- Liam Cunningham, Actor
