= Clongriffin =

Suburban development north of Dublin

Clongriffin Cluain Ghrífín (Irish)
- Housing estate (suburban)
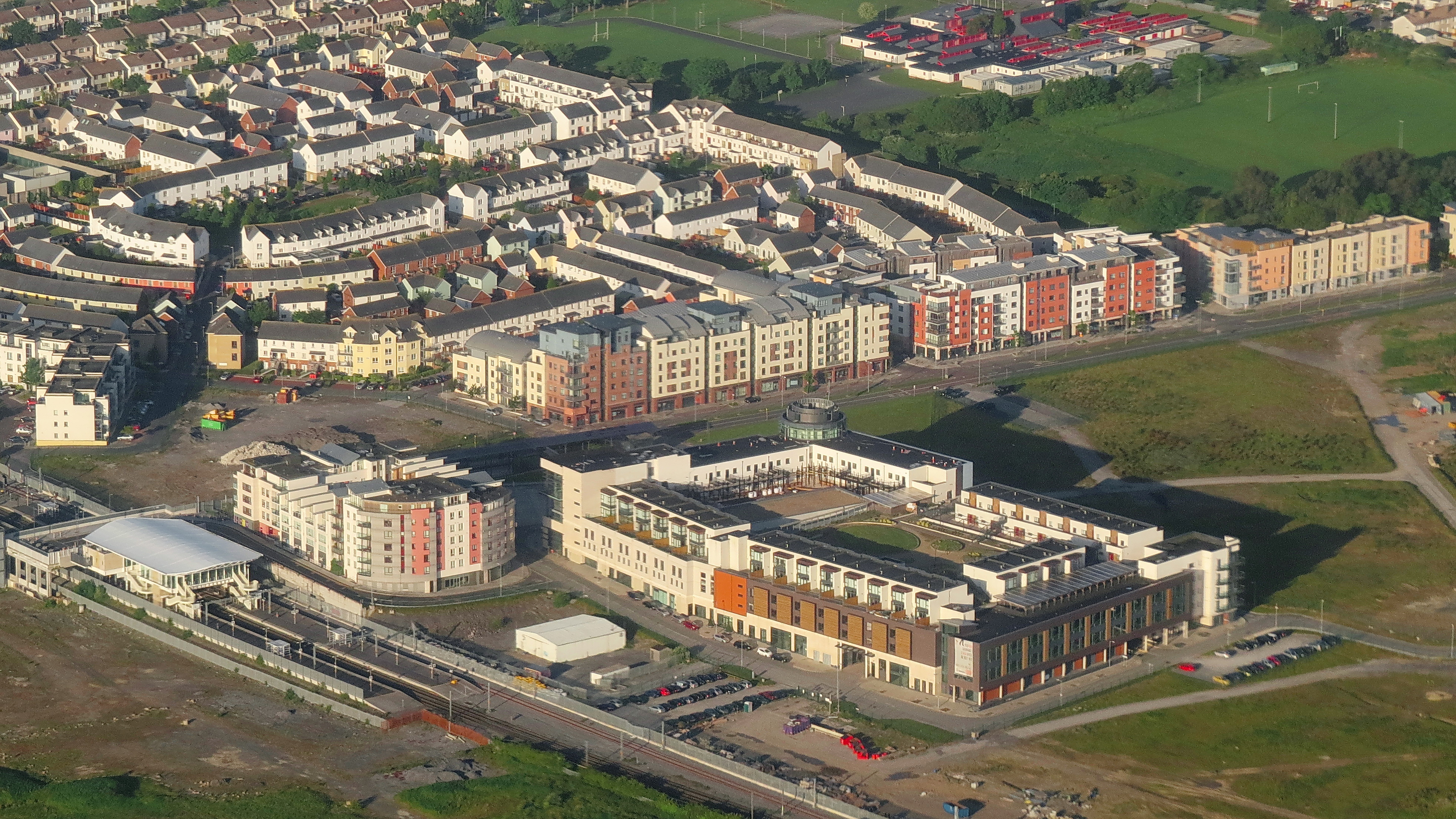
- Clongriffin

- Location in Ireland
- Coordinates: 53°24′05″N 6°09′12″W
- Country: Ireland
- Province: Leinster
- County: Dublin
- Local authority: Dublin City Council

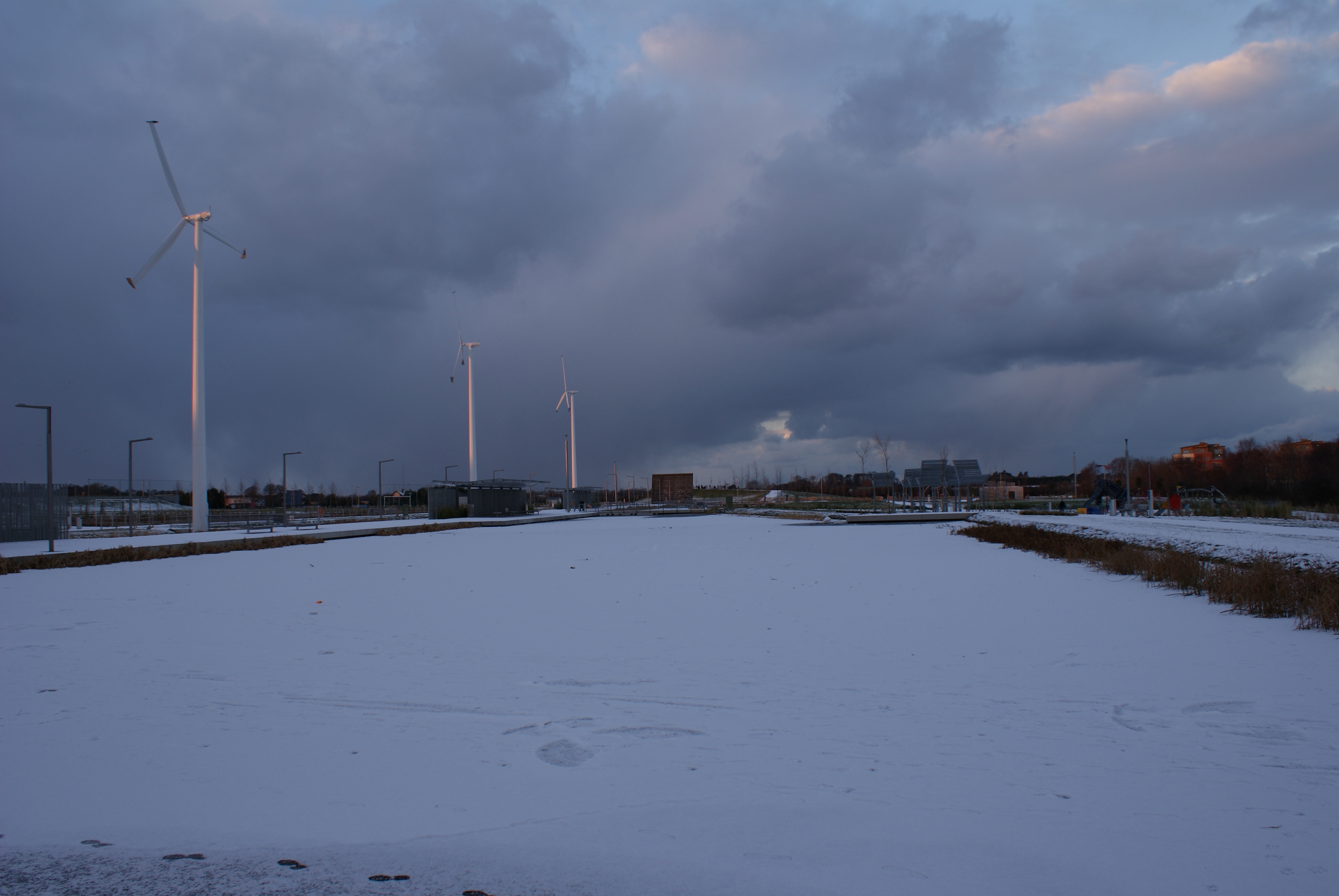
Lake frozen over in Father Collins Park with distinctive wind turbines in the background

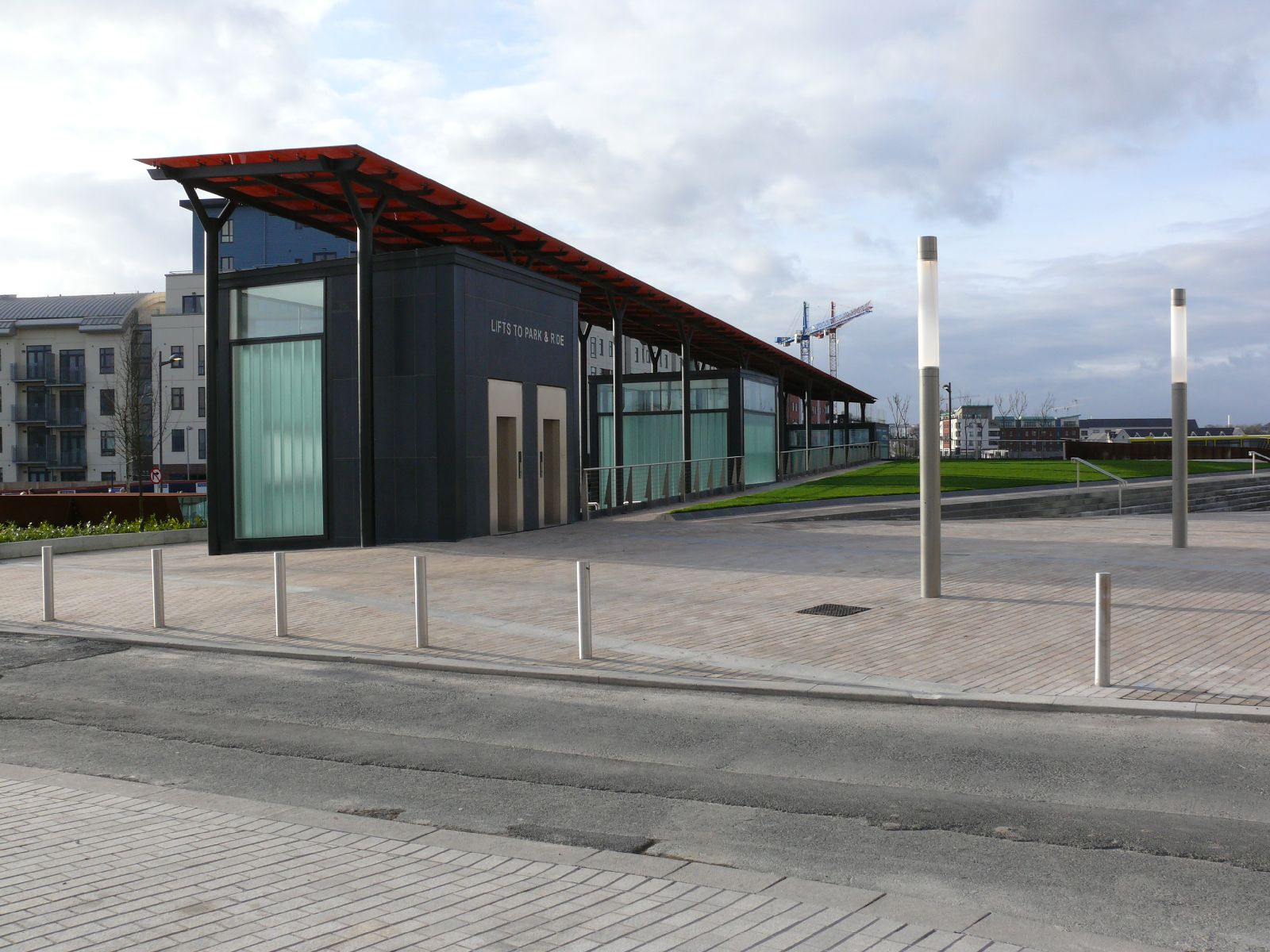
Clongriffin Park and Ride facility

Clongriffin (Irish: Cluain Ghrífín) is a community in northern Donaghmede, on the northern fringe of Dublin, Ireland. The settlement was based on a master plan vision from major developer Gannon Homes, with significant investment in transport infrastructure and also community and recreational amenities. Development slowed during the downturn in the economy, although activity renewed in recent years, with planning permission secured for a hotel and a range of additional homes including a 16-storey apartment block with residential lounges and roof gardens.

== Name ==
The name Clongriffin is a modern invention, a concatenation of "clon", the anglicisation of cluain (the Irish language word for meadow), and griffin. A griffin, griffon, or gryphon (the Irish of which is ghrífín) is a mythical beast and may be an element in the name of the adjacent district, Balgriffin.

Allegedly, architect David Wright gave Clongriffin its name while working on its development.

== Location ==
Clongriffin is 2 km (1.24 mi) inland from Baldoyle Bay and 10 km (6.21 mi) northeast of Dublin city centre, in northern Donaghmede, at the northern edge of Dublin's suburbs, in the jurisdiction of Dublin City Council. The development lies within the townland of Grange, in the civil parish of Baldoyle, from which Donaghmede was largely formed.

Clongriffin is in the Dublin Postal District Dublin 13, and in the constituency of Dublin Bay North, having been previously in Dublin North-East.

== History and composition ==
=== Early history ===
The lands of Baldoyle, on which Clongriffin, and most of Donaghmede as a whole, are situated, formed part of a large tract of high mediaeval monastic grange farmland, sometimes called the "Grange of Baldoyle." A reminder of this is the small church now called "Grange Abbey" to the south of Clongriffin. In 1166, the lands were assigned to All Saints Priory, on whose site Trinity College Dublin was later built, by Diarmait Mac Murchada, King of Leinster.

In 1369, parliament was held in the small church, called by Sir William de Windsor.

In the late 1530s, at the beginning of the Tudor conquest of Ireland, the entire settlement was invaded and seized at the behest of King Henry VIII, who in 1538 bestowed it on the Corporation of Dublin.

=== Modern history ===
Until 2003, most of the lands on which Clongriffin is being built were farmland. In July of the same year Dublin City Council granted planning permission for a mixed-use development to be called "Clongriffin at Grange Road, Donaghmede" now forming part of the Northern Fringe Development (from Clongriffin to Belmayne).

Management plans were completed in 2004 and the development, comprising houses and apartments, started in 2005 and was planned to have educational, retail and service facilities, including a multi-screen cinema. Clongriffin was part of the Northern Fringe Development (along with Belmayne in Balgriffin and estates on the former Baldoyle Racecourse and in northern Coolock) and was approved by the local authorities to provide new accommodation for Dublin on green belt land, and was to complete the development of north Donaghmede. Clongriffin's early component developments comprised Grange Lodge, Beau Park, Station Point, Marrsfield, Parkside, and Belltree. Nearby, but across the main Donaghmede-Portmarnock road, was the Priory Hall development.

For further history and general notes, see also the Donaghmede and Baldoyle articles.

=== Provision of services ===
No area of the estate has yet been taken in charge by Dublin City Council and the council maintains that it has made no commitment in this respect. Nevertheless, the council, working with a private management company, perform refuse collection. However, the local community have been told that Irish Rail requested that Dublin City Council take Main Street in charge before the opening of the railway station.

=== Pyrite settlement and remediation ===
In early 2008, it was alleged that the mineral pyrite was found in the stone hardcore used in the construction of some homes in various housing estates in north Dublin, including Beaupark in Clongriffin. Pyrite remediation of affected ground level dwellings is underway after a settlement was reached in March 2011 in a Commercial Court case. Menolly Homes and The Lagan Group accepted responsibility for the defective infill used, and have set up a trust fund to cover costs for remediation of all homes affected by pyrite in Clongriffin. Remediation began in May 2011.

=== Development pause and resumption ===
Development stalled in the late 2000s, owing to such factors as the downturn in the Irish economy, developer financial problems, and reduced demand. As a result, some areas of Clongriffin remained enclosed by construction hoarding for years. In the meantime, Dublin City Council formulated a Local Area Plan for Clongriffin and Belmayne (the North Fringe) as part of the Dublin City Development Plan 2011–2017, and provision continued in the new City Development Plan.

The developer stayed engaged with the community during the hiatus. In 2017, development resumed, and Clongriffin is now undergoing a second phase of development to enhance amenities and construct further housing.

== Transport and access ==
=== Road ===
Clongriffin is reached by Hole in the Wall Road from its junction with Grange Road and the N32 road, the latter in turn connecting to Malahide Road, and the M1 and M50 motorways. In addition, Go Car have vehicles located in Clongriffin Town Square.

=== Rail ===
Clongriffin railway station is situated along the Dublin–Belfast railway line between Howth Junction and Portmarnock railway station, and is served by Dublin Area Rapid Transit (DART) and passed by InterCity (Iarnród Éireann) trains towards Belfast. Access to a Park and Ride underground car park, with 400 spaces, is located on Clongriffin's Main Street.

=== Bus ===
Dublin Bus provides the number 15 service which is one of Dublin's 24H "cross town" routes. It serves from Station Square, Clongriffin to Palmerston Park, Rathmines via Malahide Road, Dublin Connolly railway station, Nassau Street, Dublin, Saint Stephen's Green, Rathmines, Rathgar, Terenure, and Ballycullen.

A late-night bus is provided by the 29N Nitelink service from D'Olier Street to Baldoyle Road, stopping on Grange Road approximately one kilometre from Clongriffin's Main Street.

== Amenities ==
=== Retail ===
Clongriffin has a gym, medical centre, pharmacy, chiropractor, barber, small supermarket (a larger store was planned but did not materialize) and off-licence, a chip shop and Italian and Chinese restaurants. There are retail units available to let.

Existing shopping facilities nearby (between one and three kilometres away) include small shopping plazas at Baldoyle and Clare Hall, and the larger Donaghmede Shopping Centre, and Clarehall Shopping Centre on Malahide Road.

=== Cycling, walking, and running ===
Several pedestrian, running, and cycle routes meet at Station Square. From here, there is a passage to Father Collins Park and beyond the civic steps to Dublin coastal walkways and Baldoyle Bay, the estuary of two rivers and a noted wetland, which was declared a nature reserve in 1988.

There is a walking route with access across the railway lines to Baldoyle Bay.

=== Father Collins Park ===
The redeveloped Father Collins Park, running to the northern edge of Donaghmede, and adjacent to Clongriffin, was officially reopened in May 2009 and is Ireland's first wind-powered and "self-sustainable" public park. The park has since won a number of awards such as The Sustainability Award 2010, Best Public Space 2010, and Best Public Park & Best Environmentally Friendly Initiative for 2010. It was short listed by the European Union Prize for Contemporary Architecture in 2011.

Five 50 kilowatt wind turbines provide power for the projection of water from its central lake, public lighting, maintenance depots, and sports club changing rooms. The 54 acre (26 hectare) park includes some natural woodland. There is a peripheral running/cycling track, six playing pitches and six fitness stations. There are also a promenade, concert amphitheatre, and picnic areas with outdoor chess or draughts boards, two playgrounds and a skate park.

=== Education ===
Clongriffin has a crèche called The Learning Circle.

While the development has no schools of its own, two new primary schools lie to the west of Clongriffin in the Belmayne development in Balgriffin, another constituent housing estate of the North Fringe. One of them, St. Francis of Assisi school, is under the patronage of the Roman Catholic Church and the other is an Educate Together (multi-denominational and co-educational) school. The next nearest school complex is a set of primary schools mid-Donaghmede and there are other primary and secondary schools nearby, in other localities of Donaghmede and in Baldoyle.

=== Religion ===
The Holy Trinity Church serves the Roman Catholic parishioners of Donaghmede-Clongriffin-Balgriffin Parish, created in 1974, as Donaghmede (Holy Trinity) Parish.

St Doulagh's Church, Balgriffin serves Church of Ireland parishioners and has been used for services since the Tudor conquest of Ireland.

The only religious facility actually within the Clongriffin development is a small Islamic Centre. There were plans to build the largest mosque in Ireland there, part of a €40 million development also to involve a cultural centre, conference centre, primary school, secondary school, fitness centre and eight apartments and landscaped gardens. The mosque would cater for up to 3,000 people. The latest report from Gannon Homes says that the construction of the mosque will not go ahead due to lack of funding and the land will be used for residential development as originally planned. On 8 July 2016 Dublin City Council gave planning permission for a housing development marketed as 'Belltree' under the planning application number 2601/16. This replaced the previous permission for a mosque and cultural centre provide under planning number 3325/12. The Belltree development has commenced and units were still on sale as of early 2019.

== Nature ==
Clongriffin is adjacent to Baldoyle Bay, with the estuaries of the Sluice River and Mayne River, and wetlands, all of which are protected by the National Parks and Wildlife Service. Declared a Statutory Nature Reserve in 1988, the inner estuarine part of the estuary and wetlands of Baldoyle Bay are protected as a Special Area of Conservation (SAC). Under the Ramsar Convention, the wetlands have been designated as of international importance. They support several habitats that are listed on the EU Habitats Directive.

There was until the late 1990s a stream running west and northwest from the southeastern corner of Father Collins Park (where Main Street now passes) to Stapolin and into the Grange Stream tributary of the Mayne River. This stream is no longer visible.

The open lands of Clongriffin and Father Collins Park host migrating birds, including Arctic and African-Eurasian migratory birds. The internationally important population of brent geese which frequent the broad area around Baldoyle Bay is of particular interest.
