= Nutgrove (disambiguation) =

Nutgrove is a southern suburb of Dublin, Ireland.

Nutgrove or Nut Grove may also refer to:

- Nut Grove, an historic house in Albany, New York
- Nut Grove, St. John's, Antigua and Barbuda, a village
- Nutgrove Beach, Tasmania, Australia, a beach
- Nutgrove, Queensland, Australia, a rural locality in Toowoomba Region
- Nutgrove Shopping Centre, in the Dublin suburb
- Nutgrove, St Helens, Merseyside, England, a suburban area
