= Father Collins Park =

Public park, Donaghmede, Dublin

Coordinates: 53.405442°N 6.160351°W

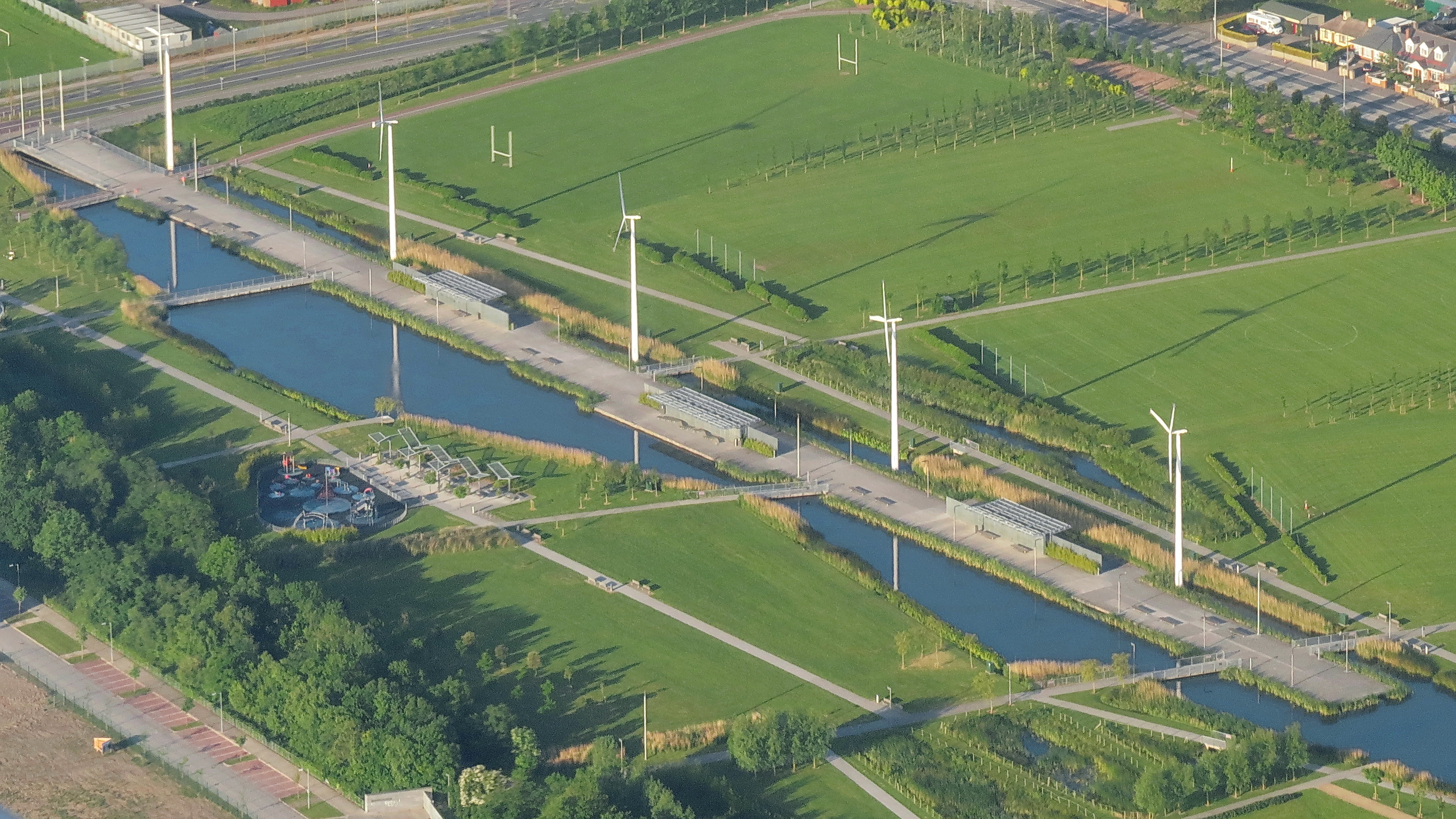
Father Collins Park

Father Collins Park (Irish: Páirc an Athar Uí Choileáin) is a public park located in Dublin, Ireland, near the boundary of Dublin city and Fingal. Its official address is Donaghmede, and it is located near the new development at Clongriffin, with Balgriffin a little to the west. It is owned and managed by Dublin City Council.

== History ==
Father Collins Park is situated on part of an historic site that is significant from the medieval era, or more specifically, the Norman period. The park comprises part of the original and extensive Grange of Baldoyle, farmland supporting the Priory of All Saints (on the site of which Trinity College Dublin now stands), which had a chapel, now called Grange Abbey, the ruins of which still stand. During the early days of the Reformation in Ireland, the monastic settlements along the north east coast of Dublin (including Grange Abbey and accompanying farmland) were seized en masse at the behest of Henry VIII of England, who later gave it to the Corporation of Dublin. To date, Dublin City Council continue to own and oversee swathes of the medieval monastic settlements of 'Grange of Baldoyle', including Grange Abbey, Father Collins Park, and the smaller park which retains the link along Hole in the Wall Road. (See also Roman Catholic Archdiocese of Dublin and Civil parishes in Ireland.)

The park was originally opened in memory of a former parish priest, Father Joe Collins, who worked to ensure public access to the lands. Having been farmland since at least early medieval times, the park initially comprised natural woodlands, ancient hedgerow, open spaces and playing fields for sports.

The redeveloped park was officially re-opened by the Lord Mayor of Dublin, Eibhlin Byrne, and blessed by Archbishop Diarmuid Martin on 27 May 2009, following a €20 million redevelopment project.

Father Collins Park continues to be owned and maintained by Dublin City Council.

== Development ==
=== Layout ===
Redevelopment work on what was Ireland's first wind-powered and sustainable public park began in September 2007 to a design by Argentinian architectural practice, Abelleyro and Romero. The design included sustainable features such as: wetlands which treat and store surface water from the park to prevent run-off, wind turbines to power the park, a green roof on the sports pavilion, use of Irish materials such as Carlow limestone, use of recycled materials in the concrete paving of the promenade and also the playground surfaces and newly planted native hedgerows. All of its originally installed five 50 kW wind turbines have since been dismantled except for the concrete pillars. The public lighting and sport club changing rooms are now powered through external utility providers.

The park has won a number of awards such as The Sustainability Award 2010, Best Public Space 2010, and Best Public Park & Best Environmentally Friendly Initiative for 2010. More recently, it was short listed by the European Union Prize for Contemporary Architecture 2011.

The approximately 54 acres (or 26 hectares) encompasses some natural woodland; for sports, a 1.5 km peripheral running/cycling track, six playing pitches and six fitness stations; for leisure, a promenade, a concert amphitheatre and picnic areas with outdoor chess/draughts boards; and for activity, two playgrounds and a skate-park.

=== Nature ===
Father Collins Park is approximately 3 km inland from Baldoyle Bay, with its estuaries and wetlands, which are protected by the National Parks and Wildlife Service (Ireland).

Declared a Statutory Nature Reserve in 1988, the inner estuarine part of the estuary and wetlands of Baldoyle Bay are of high significance protected as a Special Area of Conservation (SAC). They support several habitats that are listed on the EU Habitats Directive. Under the Ramsar Convention, it is designated as a wetland of international importance.

Consequently, during the seasons of migration, the open lands of Father Collins Park continue to host migrating birds.

Undisturbed lands remain an important refuge and hub for Arctic and European migratory birds. This includes an internationally important population of brent geese which inhabit the estuary.
