= Donal O'Brien (footballer) =

Irish footballer (born 1968)

Personal information
- Date of birth: 6 May 1968 (age 58)
- Place of birth: Donaghmede, Republic of Ireland
- Position: Midfielder

Senior career*
Years	Team	Apps	(Gls)
1990–1994	Derry City		
1993	→ Wollongong Wolves (loan)		
1994–1995	Glentoran		
1995–1997	Crusaders		
1997–1999	Finn Harps		
1999–2000	Glenavon		
2000–2002	Ards		
2002–2003	Finn Harps		
- * Club domestic league appearances and goals

Donal O'Brien (born 6 May 1968) is an Irish former footballer.

== Early life ==
O'Brien was born in 1968 in the Donaghmede, where he grew up.

== Career ==
In 1990, O'Brien signed for Northern Irish side Derry City. In 1993, he was sent on loan to Australian side Wollongong Wolves. In 1994, he signed for Northern Irish side Glentoran. In 1995, he signed for Northern Irish side Crusaders. In 1997, he signed for Irish side Finn Harps. In 1999, he signed for Northern Irish side Glenavon. In 2000, he signed for Northern Irish side Ards. In 2002, he returned to Irish side Finn Harps.

== Style of play ==
O'Brien mainly operated as a striker.

== Personal life ==
After retiring from professional football, O'Brien worked as a youth worker. He has lived in the United States.
