= JJ McCormack =

Irish road racing cyclist and race promoter

Joseph "Joe Joe" McCormack (1926–2010), from Birr, County Offaly, Ireland, was an Irish road racing cyclist and later cycle sport administrator and race promoter, involved in the organisation of the sport in Ireland for several decades, including initiating the Junior Tour of Ireland.

== Life ==
McCormack was born in Birr, and was known as "JJ".

=== Cycling career ===
He started to cycle in the late 1930s, in Birr, and began to ride with the Eagle Cycling Club when he moved to Dublin, participating in road races and time trials. He won his first national title in 1948, and in 1951 he became Irish road race champion, while in 1953 he finished eighth in the overall ranking of the Tour of Ireland. In all, he secured 48 national titles. In 1959 he took part in the World Championships in road racing in Zandvoort, and in total he represented Ireland 23 times. He retired from mainstream racing in 1963.

==== Cycling organization ====
He was nominated by Eagle and other clubs, and elected as a member of the executive committee of the internationally-recognised cycling organisation, the Irish Cycling Federation, in 1961. He continued as an ordinary member of the ICF executive for several years, and later took a role dealing with press and public relations for a couple of years. Over time he managed the two main racing disciplines, serving a term as Time Trial Secretary in the 1970s, and from the late 1970s to the mid-1980s, several years as Road Racing Secretary. He later helped drive the work of the Irish Tripartite Committee.

==== Junior Tour of Ireland ====
McCormack started to work on cycling events from 1963, from schoolboy to pro-am. He was best known for initiating the Junior Tour of Ireland to encourage younger riders, starting in 1978. He worked closely with the former cycling federation president, Karl McCarthy, who traveled to many cycling World Cups and other events with McCormack. He also worked as a coach and accompanied the Irish team to the 1987 UCI Road World Championships, where Stephen Roche became world champion. He also worked with John Lackey on the Tour of Ireland, before they passed direction of that event to Alan Rushton and Pat McQuaid.

=== Personal life ===
McCormack married Rita, and they had four sons and one daughter, and grandchildren. The family lived on Arran Quay in central Dublin, and then in the northside suburb of Donaghmede. Of the children, Alan, Paul and John McCormack had successful amateur cycling careers, and the former two turned professional. After an illness of some years, McCormack died 9 September 2010, and after a funeral in the parish church of Donaghmede, was buried in Fingal Cemetery, Balgriffin.
