= Roches Stores =

Irish department store chain

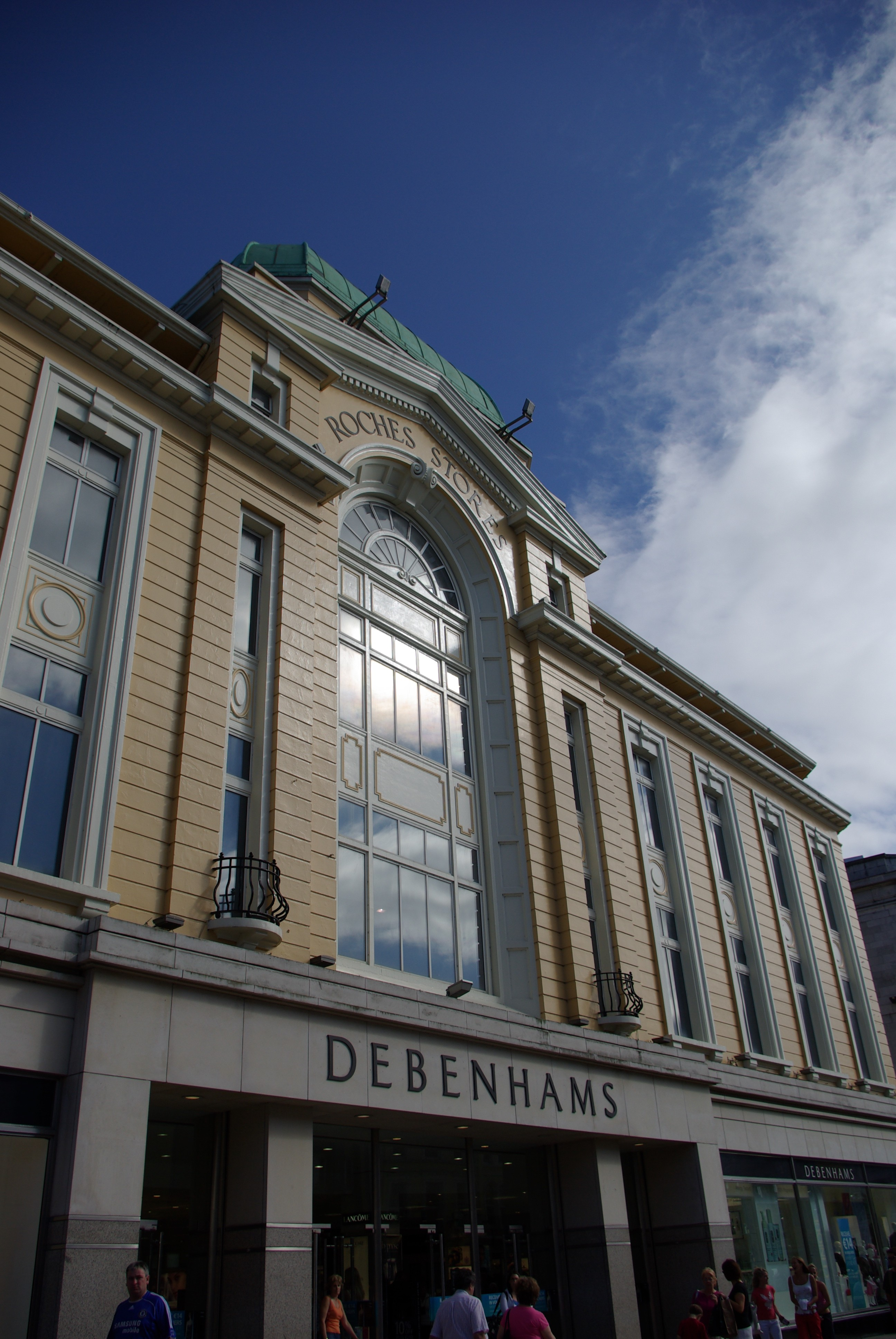
- Roches Stores in Cork, after the store was bought by Debenhams
- Type: Private
- Founded: 1901 (as Roches Stores)
- Founder: William Roche
- Defunct: 2007; 19 years ago
- Fate: Closed, most stores divested to Debenhams
- Successor: Debenhams Ireland (2006-2020)
- Headquarters: 54-62 Henry Street, Dublin 1, Ireland
- Area served: Ireland
- Key people: Roche family
- Products: Fashion clothing; toys; gifts; shoes accessories; cosmetics; home furniture; electrical & seasonal
- Owner: Roche family
- Website: http://www.roches-stores.ie (now defunct)

Roches Stores was a national chain of department stores in Ireland, that was owned by the Roche family.

Roches Stores was founded in Cork in 1901 by William Roche, the son of a farmer from north County Cork, who had worked in Cash's in Cork city and for a time in London. The business began life as a small furniture shop in a former sawmill on Merchant Street in Cork. Over the following twelve years, Roche grew the business to include womenswear and moved to a new premises on Winthrop Street. In 1919, Roche moved the business to a large premises on Patrick Street. On 11 December 1920, during the Irish War of Independence, British forces set fire to much of Cork city centre and destroyed many premises on Patrick Street, including Roche's shop. Roche moved the business back to his previous premises on Merchant Street, returning to the Patrick Street premises in May 1927 with the benefit of government compensation for the attack.

In the latter half of 1927, Roche purchased a premises on Henry Street, Dublin. He bought a premises on Sarsfield Street, Limerick in 1937, and following a fire there in 1947, the business opened a new, larger shop on O'Connell Street in 1951.

William Roche died in 1939. His widow, Kathleen, became chair. His son, William Junior, began working with the firm in 1937. His other son, Stanley, began in 1937 and his other son, Raymond, began with the business in 1950. The Lord Mayor of Dublin inaugurated Ireland's first escalator, in Roches Stores' Dublin branch, on 25 March 1963.

The business established further shops in Galway, in Wilton, Cork, and in Blackrock, Dublin in the 1970s and 1980s. In the 1990s increased to 8 shops in Dublin and open in Waterford in 1993. It expanded into Northern Ireland with a shop at The Quays Shopping Centre in Newry in 1999. The business eventually grew to a chain of eleven stores throughout Ireland. It sold a wide range of goods, including cosmetics, houseware, clothes and stationery. It was for many years the only true department store chain in the country. Their final new store opened in Tralee in 2001.

Unlike its competitors, Roches Stores generally sold more branded items, particularly clothing. This was in contrast with its competitors such as Dunnes Stores, which tended to sell own-brand items.

At their peak, eight of the locations also had co-located grocery shops. Roches Stores began to exit the grocery trade in 1999, leasing its stores to SuperValu, branded as "SuperValu at Roches Stores" although some of these stores closed after mere months. In 2005, most of Roches Stores supermarkets were closed down, with the remaining four being operated as concessions - two (in Cork) by Caulfield/McCarthy, another SuperValu franchisee, and two (in Blackrock and Galway) by Marks and Spencer.

Roches Stores caused controversy in the 1970s and early 1980s when it demolished Frescati House in Blackrock, the home of Lord Edward Fitzgerald.

On 8 August 2006, it was announced that Debenhams would buy the leaseholds of nine of the 11 Roches Stores for €29 million. Under the deal, the stores, including those in St. Patrick's Street in Cork and Henry Street in Dublin would be rebranded as Debenhams stores. The Roche family retained the ownership of the stores, and Debenhams became the new tenants. Marks & Spencer had agreed to acquire the company's Wilton outlet in Cork; however that deal later fell through due to a dispute over rent with the owners of the centre and is now occupied by Penneys. The eleventh store, in Dublin's Nutgrove Shopping Centre, was closed. In October 2007, Roches Stores ceased operating.
