= Debenhams Ireland =

Irish department store chain, formerly Roches Stores

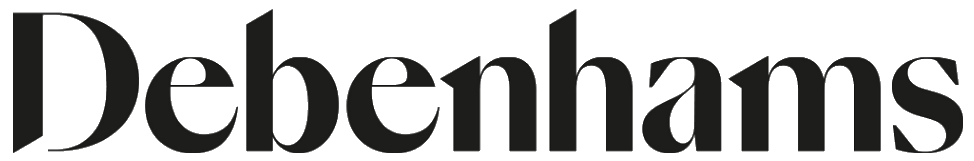

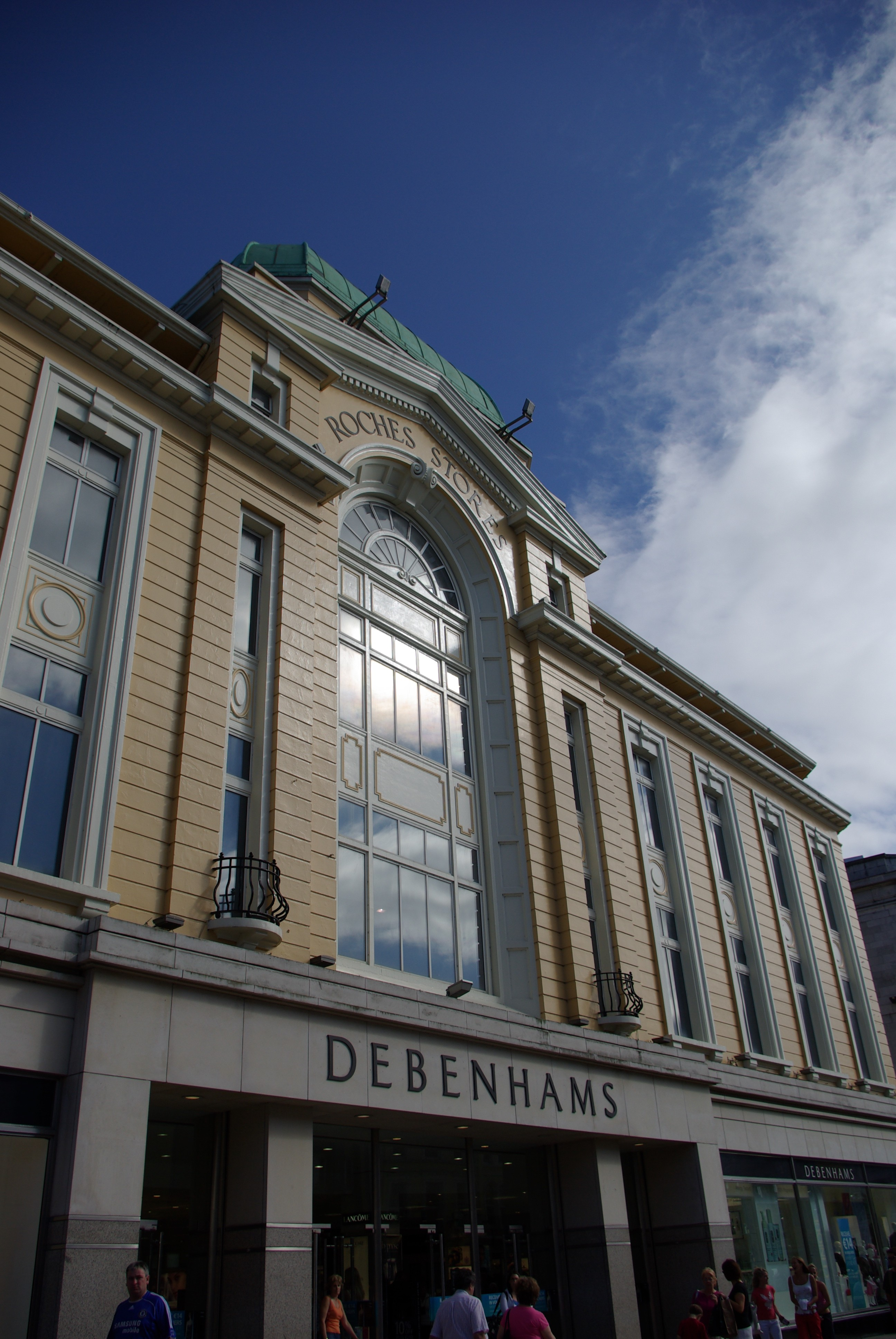
- Debenhams in Cork, with Roches Stores name still visible
- Company type: Subsidiary of Debenhams
- Predecessor: Roches Stores (1901–2006)
- Founded: 1901 (as Roches Stores); 2007 (as Debenhams Ireland)
- Founder: William Roche (Roches Stores)
- Defunct: 9 April 2020; 6 years ago
- Fate: Liquidation; Closure
- Headquarters: 54-62 Henry Street, Dublin 1, Republic of Ireland
- Area served: Republic of Ireland
- Key people: Liquidators (KPMG); Kieran Wallace; Andrew O’Leary Directors (Debenhams); Ian Deegan; John Bebbington; Sinead O’Connor
- Products: Fashion clothing; toys; gifts; shoes accessories; cosmetics; home furniture; electrical & seasonal
- Revenue: €181 million (2016)
- Operating income: €-55.5 million (2016)
- Net income: €-5.8 million (2016)
- Owner: Debenhams plc
- Number of employees: 2,000 (2019)
- Parent: Debenhams Retail (Ireland) Ltd
- Website: www.debenhams.ie

Debenhams Ireland was a national chain of department stores in Ireland that was owned ultimately by Debenhams plc. Although Debenhams had a small presence in Ireland since 1996, the chain was largely based on the former Roches Stores, which Debenhams had purchased in 2007, forming Debenhams Ireland.

== History ==
=== Roches Stores (1901–2007) ===
Debenhams Ireland has its origins in Roches Stores, a business founded in Cork in 1901 by William Roche, as a small furniture shop, the chain grew to eleven stores throughout Ireland. At their peak, eight of the locations also had co-located grocery stores. Roches Stores began to exit the grocery trade in 1999, leasing its stores to SuperValu, although some of these stores closed after mere months. In October 2007, Roches Stores ceased operating.

=== Debenhams (1996–2007) ===
The UK operations of Debenhams entered the Republic of Ireland as an opening anchor of the Jervis Shopping Centre in 1996, with a second store an opening anchor at Mahon Point Shopping Centre in 2005.

=== Debenhams Ireland (2007–2020) ===
On 8 August 2006, it was announced that Debenhams would buy the leaseholds of nine of the 11 Roches Stores for €29 million. Under the deal, the stores, including those in St. Patrick's Street in Cork and Henry Street in Dublin would be rebranded as Debenhams stores. The Roche family retained the ownership of the stores, and Debenhams became the new tenants. Marks & Spencer had agreed to acquire the company's Wilton outlet in Cork; however that deal later fell through due to a dispute over rent with the owners of the centre. The eleventh store, in Dublin's Nutgrove Shopping Centre, was closed.

Due to poor sales, Debenhams Retail (Ireland) announced in January 2010 that it would cut 170 jobs within its Republic of Ireland stores.

In November 2010 Debenhams launched Debenhams.ie, the retailer's new Irish online store.

On 12 May 2016 Debenhams Ireland filed for examinership (analogous to the US Chapter 11 bankruptcy protection process), which it exited successfully on 19 August 2016.

On 9 April 2019, the parent company based in the UK announced that it had gone into pre-pack administration. On 26 April 2019, Debenhams Ireland confirmed to customers it was under a 'new management structure' and the company Debenhams Ireland Ltd (including Northern Ireland stores) would not be affected by the administration process taking place in the UK. The only Republic of Ireland locations of Patisserie Valerie were concessions located in Debenhams branches, and these closed when the parent chain entered administration.

The parent company (Debenhams plc) went into administration once again on 6 April 2020. On 9 April 2020, Debenhams Ireland confirmed to its employees that the company would no longer operate in the Republic of Ireland. It said that stores would not reopen following the lifting of COVID-19 restrictions placed by the Government of Ireland due to the impending uncertain economic conditions faced in Ireland. The company would file for liquidation during the week beginning 13 April 2020. Despite efforts to save Debenhams in Ireland in 2016, by separating Debenhams in the UK from Debenhams in Ireland, efforts to retain the Irish business had been unsuccessful. The closure of the stores in Ireland resulted in the loss of 1,400 direct jobs and a further 700 concession related jobs. The debenhams.ie website continued to trade until December 2020 when the company suspended it due to uncertainties over brexit and trade rules.

== Closure of stores ==
In April 2020, with the parent company going into administration, it was announced that Debenhams Ireland stores—which were already temporarily closed due to the COVID-19 pandemic—would be permanently closed.

Stores permanently closed include:

- Blackrock (Dublin) (formerly Roches Stores Blackrock)
- Blanchardstown (formerly Roches Stores Blanchardstown)
- Cork (Mahon Point)
- Cork (St. Patrick's Street) (formerly Roches Stores Cork)
- Dublin (Henry Street) (formerly Roches Stores Dublin)
- Galway (formerly Roches Stores Galway)
- Limerick (formerly Roches Stores Limerick)
- Newbridge
- Tallaght (formerly Roches Stores Tallaght)
- Tralee (formerly Roches Stores Tralee)
- Waterford (formerly Roches Stores Waterford)

The oldest store, in Cork's St Patrick's Street, had been trading in that location for over 100 years.

Since the closures in April, workers have protested and prevented stock from being removed from all of the 11 stores, for last 400 plus days, as of May 2021, in order to secure 2+2 collectively agreed redundancy payments.
