= List of shopping centres in the Republic of Ireland =

This is a list of shopping centres in Ireland, which includes notable shopping complexes listed by county.

== Cork ==
- Mahon Point Shopping Centre – second largest in Munster
- Wilton Shopping Centre

== Donegal ==
- Courtyard Shopping Centre
- Letterkenny Shopping Centre

== Dublin ==
- Artaine Castle Shopping Centre
- Blanchardstown Centre – one of the two largest shopping complexes in Ireland
- Charlestown Shopping Centre
- Clarehall Shopping Centre
- Donaghmede Shopping Centre
- Dundrum Town Centre – one of the two largest shopping complexes in Ireland
- George's Street Arcade
- Ilac Centre
- Jervis Shopping Centre
- Liffey Valley
- Merrion Centre
- Northside Shopping Centre – the first covered shopping centre in Ireland
- Nutgrove Shopping Centre
- Omni Park
- The Square Tallaght
- Stephen's Green Shopping Centre
- Stillorgan Shopping Centre – the first shopping centre in Ireland
- Swords Pavilions

== Limerick ==
- Crescent Shopping Centre, Dooradoyle – largest shopping centre in Ireland outside of Dublin

== Westmeath ==
- Athlone Towncentre
- Golden Island Shopping Centre

== Former shopping centres ==
- Ballymun Shopping Centre – permanently closed 2018, demolished 2021

== See also ==
- Retail in the Republic of Ireland
