= St Patrick's Street =

One of the main streets of Cork, Ireland

- 'Pana'
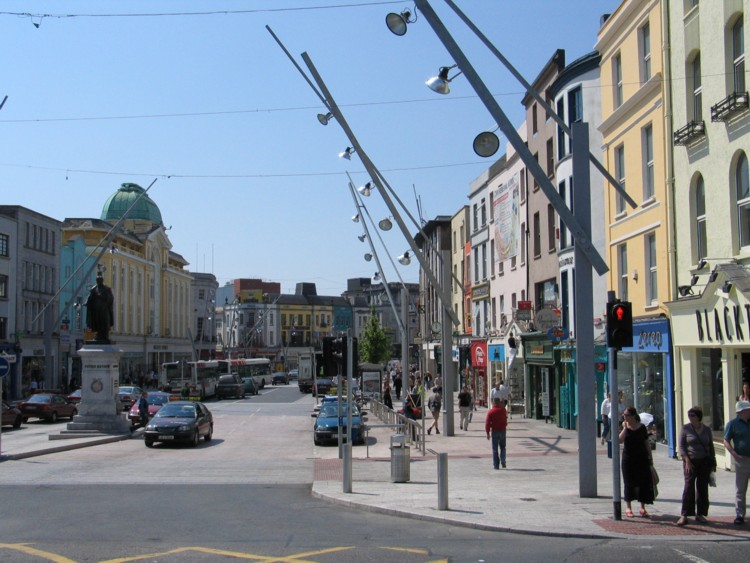
- St. Patrick's Street looking south in 2006

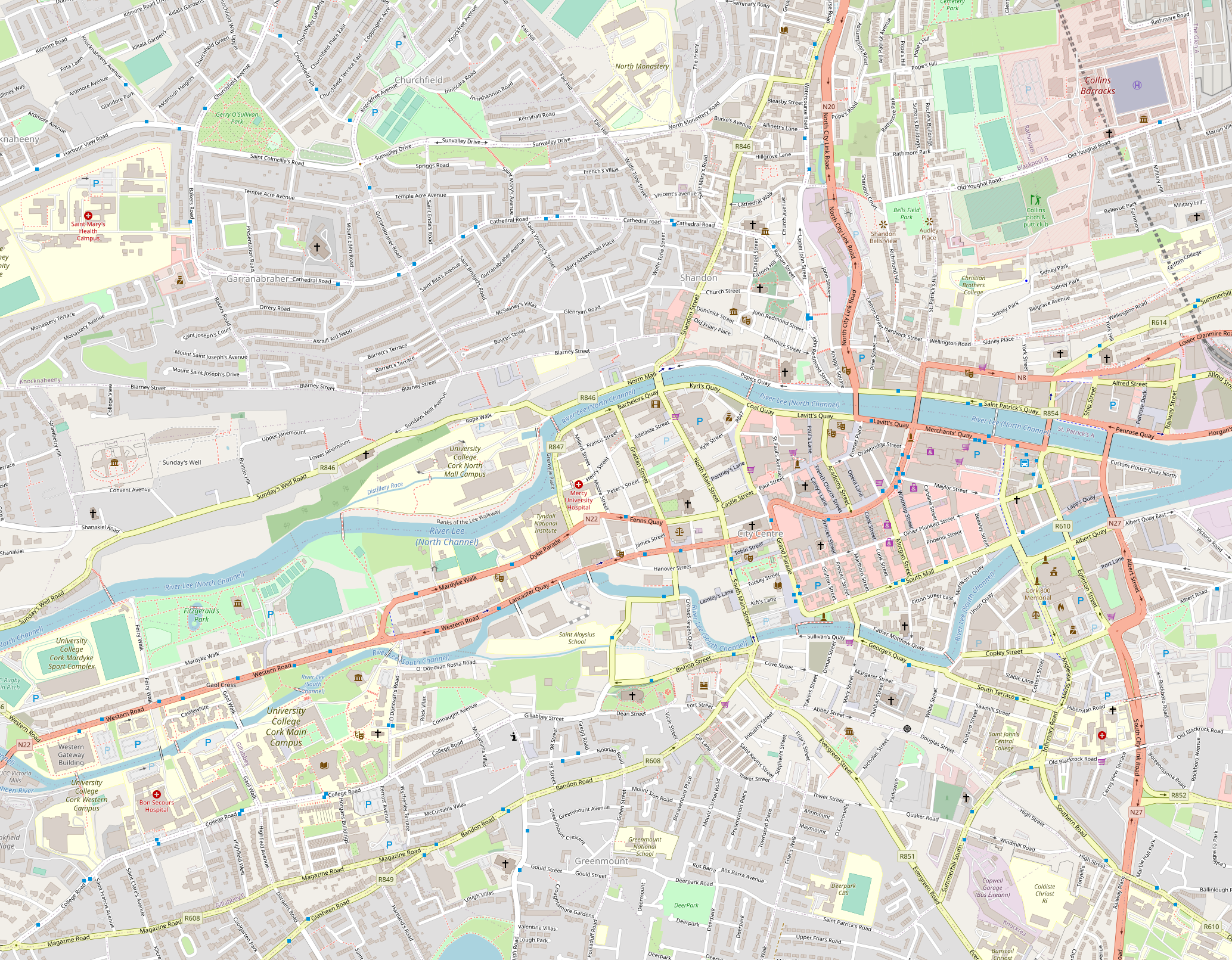
- Location within Cork Central
- Namesake: Saint Patrick
- Length: 500 m (1,600 ft)
- Width: up to 35 metres (115 ft)
- Location: Cork, Ireland
- Coordinates: 51°53′55″N 8°28′20″W
- northeast end: Merchant's Quay, Bridge Street
- Major junctions: Grand Parade, Merchant's Quay, Lavitt's Quay
- southwest end: Grand Parade

Other
- Known for: shops, English Market

St Patrick's Street (Irish: Sráid Naomh Pádraig) is the main shopping street of the city of Cork in the south of Ireland. The street was subject to redevelopment in 2004, and has since won two awards as Ireland's best shopping street. St Patrick's Street is colloquially known to most locals as simply 'Patrick's Street', with the 'St' honorific dropped, in accordance with the pattern applied to many locations named after saints. It is also referred to colloquially by some locals as "Pana", with the first 'a' being elongated.

== Location ==
St Patrick's Street runs in a curve from Saint Patrick's Bridge to Daunt Square, where it meets Grand Parade. The street obtains its curved shape due to its location over an arm of the River Lee.

== History ==
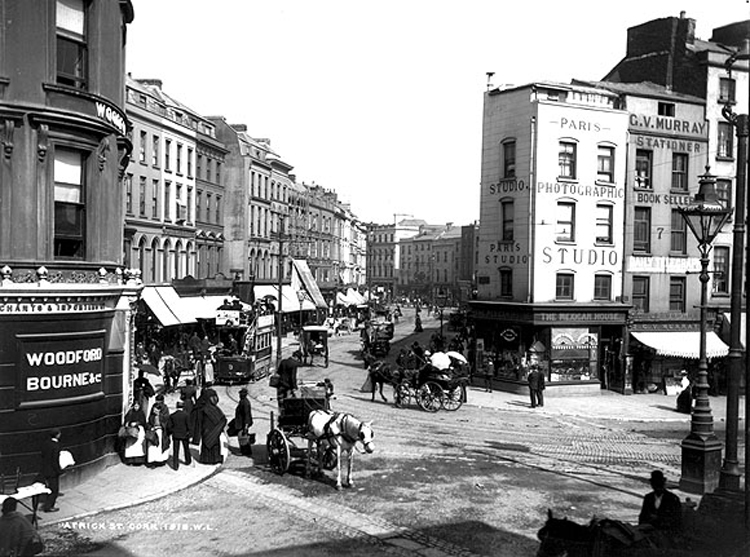
View of St. Patrick's Street from Daunt Square (circa 1890)

The street dates from the late 18th century, when the city expanded beyond the walls of the ancient city, which was centred on North and South Main Streets. During the 1780s, many of the streets that now make up the city centre of Cork were formed by the spanning of the river channels of the Lee, between marshy islands.

From 1898 to 1931, the street was served by the Cork Electric Tramways and Lighting Company. Services started on 22 December 1898, although it closed on 30 September 1931 due to increasing popularity of bus services operated by The Irish Omnibus Company and the takeover of the company's electricity plant by the Electricity Supply Board (ESB).

Parts of Patrick Street were extensively damaged during the Irish War of Independence in an event known as the "Burning of Cork" in 1920. This included the Munster Arcade and Grant's department store.

In 2004, the street was redeveloped by architect Beth Gali to be more "pedestrian-friendly". This included repaving, and as well as widening of pedestrian pavements to create plazas.

In the early 21st century, the street underwent various modernisation and rejuvenation projects, including the opening of Opera Lane in 2010, the redesign of shop facades in 2016, and the development of the former Capitol Cinema site in 2017.

Between March and April 2018, Cork City Council banned afternoon traffic on Patrick Street, with only public transport traffic allowed between 3:00 p.m. and 6:30 p.m. While the ban was lifted within a few weeks, due to a reported impact on city centre traders, it was subsequently reinstated. Its enforcement has reportedly been inconsistent.

== Businesses and landmarks ==
The street is home to a number of retail and department stores, which at the northern end includes Brown Thomas, Dunnes Stores, Marks & Spencer and Penneys. The Roches Stores building, built at the northern end of the street in the mid-1920s, housed the Roches Stores department store from the early 20th century until leased by Debenhams Ireland, who operated it from 2006 until 2020. The opposite (southwestern) end of the street includes smaller units, with jewellery stores such as Pandora, video game stores like GameStop, and health store Holland & Barrett.

A monument to Fr. Theobald Mathew, the Apostle of Temperance, stands at the northern end of the street facing St. Patrick's Bridge over the River Lee. The monument dates back to October 1864.
