= St Doulagh's Church =

Church with holy well, County Dublin, Ireland

Coordinates: 53°24′55″N 6°10′45″W

St Doulagh's Church (Irish: Clochar Dúiligh) is the oldest stone-roofed church still in use in Ireland. It is situated approximately 10 kilometres from Dublin city, just north of the hamlet of Balgriffin, within Fingal and in the traditional County Dublin, and is marked as "St Doulagh's Church, Balgriffin". Its complex also comprises an octagonal baptistry built over a holy well - Ireland's only surviving standalone baptistry - and a stone housing over a pool. St Doulagh's is one of the two churches in the Church of Ireland "United Parishes of Malahide, Portmarnock and St Doulagh's.

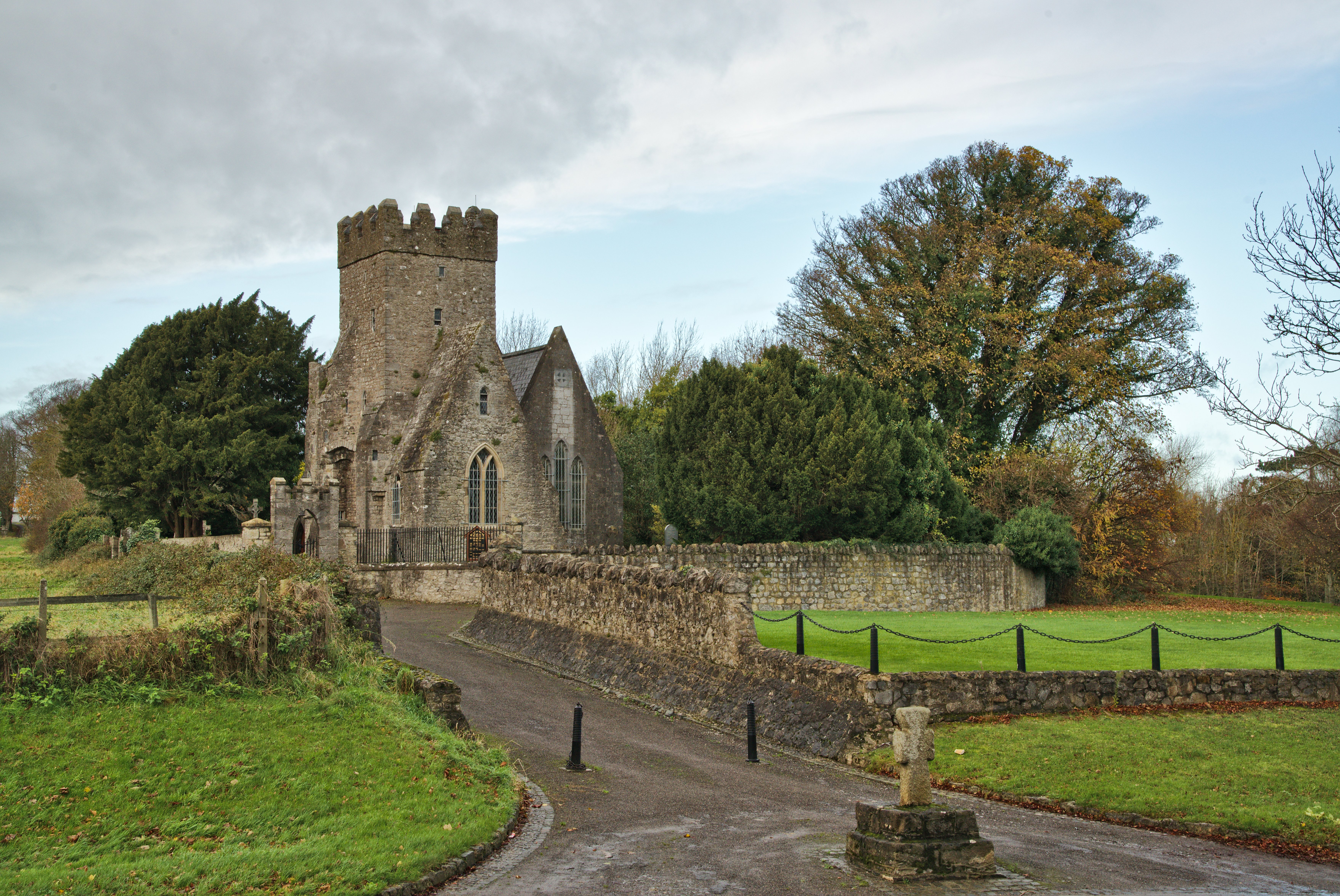
St Doulagh's Church

== History and status ==
The oldest part of the church as it stands is medieval dating from the 12th century, and believed to have been home to a small monastic settlement. However, according to studies on the site, Christian activity here dates back to the time of St. Patrick.

Hudson (2005) states that King Sitric of Dublin gave land at St Doulough's, Portrane and Reachrain (probably Lambay Island) to Holy Trinity (Christ Church Cathedral, Dublin). In 1179, Pope Alexander III gave the "church lands at Clochar" to Laurence O'Toole, Archbishop of Dublin, so it was already church land - but there was no mention of a building. In regard to the other sites mentioned in the papal document, buildings are noted, suggesting that there may have been no useful building then at St Doulough's. The Canons Regular of St Augustine had by then been administering Christ Church. It seems possible that construction of the present building started about that time. However, there is no mention of a church at St Doulough's in the papal taxation lists of the early 14th century.

It is not until 1406 that the first definite mention of a church at St Doulough's is made, when indulgences were granted by the Archbishop of Armagh to all who visited the church of St Doulough in the diocese of Dublin and confessed their sins to the resident chaplain Eustace Roche, and made a payment to the church. Rachel Moss believes that the church referred to is the eastern end of the medieval building and speculates that the funds generated may have then spurred building expansion. It seems likely from all this that construction of the present building started soon after the granting of the site to Holy Trinity by the Pope, and that additions and alterations were made in succeeding centuries, the dates of which are guesswork based on various narratives.

Following the English Reformation, the church and its assets came into the control of the Established church. The majority Roman Catholic population was obliged to conduct its services elsewhere, often in private accommodations. There was a regular "pattern" held at the church until at least the 18th century. Since 1974, the church of the Holy Trinity in Donaghmede has served the Roman Catholic parishioners of that area, including later-built Clongriffin, and Balgriffin.

== St Doulagh ==
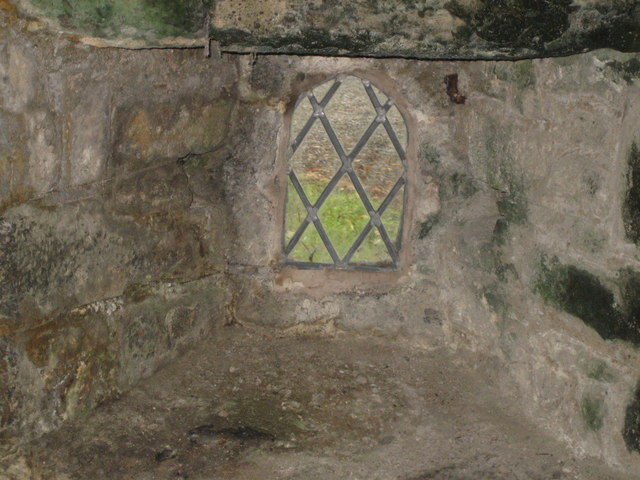
Hermit's window. Tradition has it that this low window in the church is where the hermit St. Doulough placed his plate in the hope of receiving food

Very little is known of St Doulagh (Irish: Naomh Dúileach) who gave his name to the church. It is calculated that he lived in the early 7th century and was a hermit/anchorite. He is said to have lived isolated, in a cell attached to the church, and to have had only minimal contact with the outside world. Anchoritism was a feature of the Celtic church and one of many interesting points of similarity between Ireland's early Christianity and the Eastern churches.

There is no extant history of St Doulough, and his dates are a matter for conjecture. Reeves (1859) stated that St Duilech is mentioned in Sacred Genealogies as the son of Malach, son of Sinell, and eighth in descent from Fergus Mac Rossa who is supposed to have lived in Christian Ireland. Reeves also mentions a St Mobhi (as told in the Leabhar Laighin, Book of Leinster) as an uncle of St Duilech. St Mobhi's death was mentioned by Tighernach as 630, and thus Reeves assigns the year 600 as approximately the time St Duilech lived. The Martyrology of Donegal says he was of the race of Conmac, son of Fergus, son of Ros, son of Rudhraidhe, and Clochar is given as the name of his church. The Gaelic for Grangegorman is Cill Duiligh, which suggests he had a connection with that place. There are other early documents that refer to St Duilech of Clochar (Rachel Moss, 2003) and the site is referred to as Clochar in many documents up to the late 1500s. The earliest historical reference to the church dates from the ninth century, in The Martyrology of Oengus; in that text, the church is called Duilech Cain Clochair.

The early documentation of St Doulough is sketchy, but legend has it that he was an anchorite. In the Calendar of Christ Church, he is described as ‘Episcopus and Confessor’, suggesting a ministry. A later anchorite, resident in St Douloughs, Eustace Roche, was also a confessor and the record of 1406 states that indulgences were granted to those who confessed to him and made a donation to the church.

There was an alternative view of the origins of the name Doulough, but it was more tenuous. Dr Ledwich, in Antiquities of Ireland, is quoted in an 1833 edition of the Dublin Penny Journal to the effect that the church was founded by St Olave, a Norseman, and that this name was corrupted to Doulough. Indeed, there are a number of churches in Britain dedicated to the Norse saint. However, the architecture of this building is agreed to be Irish. Dr Ledwich took the view that the western end of the church was much older than the eastern end or the tower. Dr Ledwich pointed out that the framing of some windows suggests that they were made by assorted carved stones gathered (possibly pillaged, which is what Norsemen were said to be prone to) from various sites. In any case, further re-arranging of these stones in times long after the Norsemen, is indicated by a sequence of alterations. However, Dr Ledwich's views of the founding saint and the dating of the church have been disproved by recent scholarship, especially by Reeves, Moss and Harbison.

There is a curved ditch to the north of the site. This is thought to date from the 6th or 7th century (Rachel Moss, 2002) and indicates a Christian settlement and graveyard. St Doulough could have occupied the site at that time. Excavation work on the ditch by Grassroots Archaeology in 2015 at least does not disprove this theory, and suggests that a circular ditch once enclosed the entire site. The investigation by Grassroots Archaeology centred on a spot to the west of the church, by the road entrance where there was a ditch in medieval times. The fact that the road curves away from the church at this point suggests such a feature.

The feast day of St Doulagh is November 17.

== The Chapel of Saint Samson, Balgriffin ==
There was an ancient chapel at Balgriffin, that was dedicated to the Welsh saint, Saint Samson (Samson of Dol). St. Samson is sometime incorrectly credited with founding a monastery at St. Doulagh's. The chapel was united with St. Doulagh's in 1543, by the 17th century the abandoned chapel was in ruins. Evidence of the church form the 10th century, was uncovered during recent excavations some 400meters from the village, in place called churchfields. Recent housing developments have been named after St. Samson in Balgriffin.

== The buildings ==
=== The church ===
The main historic building is 48 feet by 18 feet, with a double roof of rough stone set with cement. The space between the inner and outer, wedge-style, roof is usable. Partway along the roof is a small stone tower. There is a small door on the south face, with a rough arch, and traces of smoother arches on either side. Inside are a smaller room, with the reputed tomb of St Doulagh, and a larger room, the former main place of worship, with a stairway to the upper floor and tower.

Along the stairway is the Prior's chamber, then an area where the clergy may have eaten and slept.

A modern church structure was added in 1864, and consecrated in 1865.

=== Holy well, baptistry and pool ===
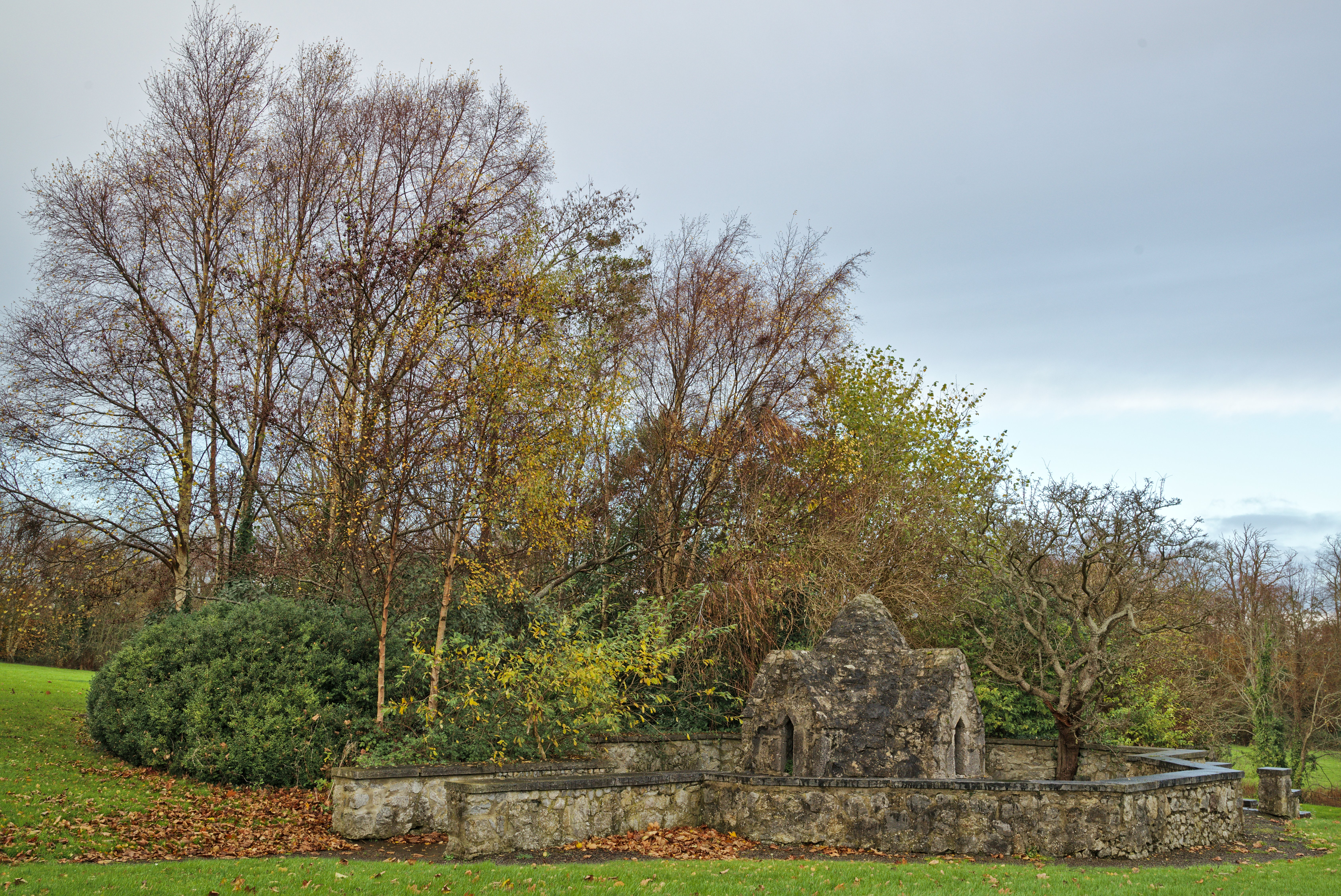
St. Doulagh's Well, a detached baptistry near St. Doulagh's Church in Fingal, Ireland.

The complex at St Doulagh's includes, in the field beyond the church and slightly nearer the road, a sunken stone enclosure. Within this is a low octagonal building, covering a spring, known as St Doulagh's Well. Outside the building is an open-air pool with stone seating, where pilgrims used to gather on November 17. The octagonal building is believed to have been a baptistry, the only surviving detached baptistry in Ireland, and the pool alongside may have been used for adult immersion.

The baptistry was repaired and supplied with fresco paintings of St Patrick, St Doulagh, St Bridget and St Columcille, and others, by a resident of the vanished village of Feltrim, in 1609. The frescos were damaged by soldiers of Sir Richard Bulkeley of Dunlavin after the Battle of the Boyne.

Down a short path beyond the sunken enclosure is a stairway down to a small rectangular stone building which contains a pool of water, called St Catherine's Pond. This may also have been used for baptismal rites. It is connected to St Doulagh's well by a subterranean link, and a single spring supplies both.

=== The cross ===
There is also a cross, of non-local granite, at the entrance.

=== Functions of the church building ===
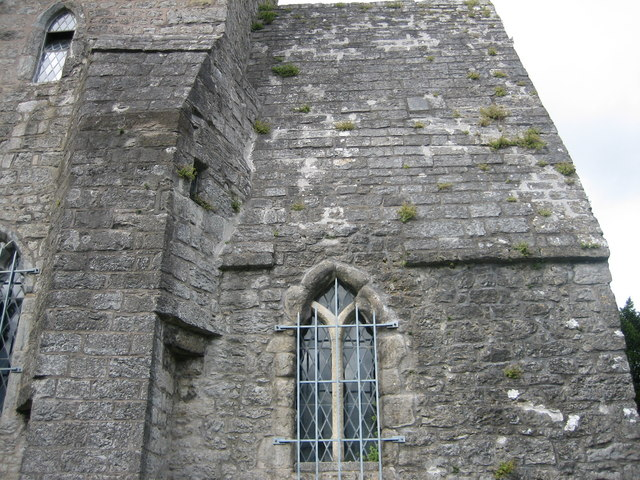
Detail of stone roof

Moss (2003) took the view that southeastern part of this building, now known as ‘The Oratory’, was erected first. At the very least this was to provide living accommodation, possibly functioning as a church. At ground floor level, to the west of The Oratory is a small room with its own entrance. This could have been accommodation for an additional resident clergyman or anchorite. It was common in medieval Ireland for such a room to be added to the west of a church for an anchorite who might be an unordained person following monastic rules. (O’Keefe, 2015) It seems possible that the building of the tower house took place after the 1406 granting of an indulgence, centred on the church, generated the necessary funds. Certainly, the battlements serve a purpose different from a simple cell. There is an arcade of two arches in the northwestern corner of the Oratory. This has led to speculation that an aisle was built in this position at the time the tower house was built, in order to accommodate a larger congregation.

By 1406 the Normans were firmly established in their sphere of influence, The Pale. One of their colonising projects was Norman control of the Church. The Norman method of operating suggests that they established at some time, at their convenience, their own incumbent priest in St Doulough's. The tower house could well have been built for such a person, to provide better accommodation and to project a sense of power. The building of the tower house might suggest consolidation rather than significant expansion since a rural population, possibly poor, was unlikely to expand. Funds for the tower house might otherwise have come from tithes, were funds from tithes available. A decree of the Synod of Cashel in 1170 ordered that tithes be paid by every man to his parish. However, Geraldus Cambrensis stated in 1185 that the Irish do not yet pay tithes. Norman efficiency may well have rectified that. There are records of tithes being granted to the Abbey of St Thomas in Dublin in the late 1100s.

In 1506 a grant of lands was made by John Burnell of Ballygriffin (Balgriffin) to John Young, chaplain of St Douloughs for a chantry in the chapel of St Douloughs. (Moss, 2002) This would have provided funds for the saying of Masses for Burnell, patron of the church and would have enabled him to be buried within the church. An investigation by Leo Swan in 1987 found evidence of a late medieval burial in the north wall. This may be the grave of John Burnell. There is nothing to suggest that the chantry involved the building of a separate chapel. In medieval times tombs in such a position were used as ‘Easter Sepulchres’, the devotional practice of placing the consecrated host on such a tomb on Good Friday and Holy Saturday, symbolic of the entombment of Jesus. (O’Keefe, 2015) That at least might be a possibility here.

By 1630 St Douloughs had fallen on hard times. In visiting the building that year, Archbishop Burkeley found that the church was in a ruinous state with no ornaments and that the parishioners and indeed the owner of the lands were Catholic and worshipped elsewhere. (R Moss, 2002) The Civil Survey of Dublin, done between 1654 and 1656 found that ‘the church lands of St Dowlagh’s’ consisted of three small thatched houses and the wall of a decayed chapel. It would appear for that that St Douloughs was no longer a functioning church. It implies that the stone roofs were no longer intact.

Rebuilding certainly took place in this era, post 1656, at the end of the Cromwellian war and it is to that time we may ascribe many of the features we see today: windows of varying shape and design, windows at low level believed to have been used as gun ports. Other changes may have been made at this time. (Moss, 2002) A stairway was inserted in the south west corner of the Oratory which blocked the lavatory which had earlier been installed in the tower house. We can still see the lavatory chute which ascends from near ground level to where the lavatory once stood. An earlier stair by the present south door was removed from the south east corner of the tower house and a hole made in the ceiling over the entrance, perhaps for defensive purposes.

=== Ceremonies in the church ===
The purpose of the church was for the assembly of the faithful for the celebration of Christian rites. In the medieval period, liturgical practices according to the Roman rite had become standardised in the Christian world, with some regional variations. (O’Keefe, 2015) We can expect that there was Mass, weekly and perhaps daily, baptisms, marriages and funerals. We can expect that there was an altar, now gone. We have a small baptismal font on a pedestal inside, which would have been traditionally placed inside the church door, symbolising entrance to the church by baptism, and a more elaborate one to the north of the church, which clearly dates from a period much later than the church's foundation, having a design similar to the huge Renaissance baptistry in Florence. There are the remains of a piscina (Figure 21) for the washing of hands and vessels, possibly wall mounted, with a drain leading outside, or perhaps the waste water drained into a vessel. The church would have had wooden furnishings, now gone.

Infant baptism had become standard by the eleventh century. Baptism was probably performed with much ceremony. The performance of baptism was evidence of a parochial church. A church decree from a synod in Dublin in 1186 ordered that an immovable baptismal font of stone be placed in the church in such a place as would allow a pascal procession to conveniently pass around. An immovable baptismal font in St Doulough's confined space may not have been practicable. There is indeed a movable baptism font. It is very likely that a pascal procession did take place. Within St Doulough's church, there was limited space for a procession so it may have continued outside. A tradition in relation to baptisms may have been in place before any regulations were established that led eventually to the building of a baptistry outside, regarded as the only one of its kind in Ireland. The outside baptistry is centred on a well. Local tradition has it that baptisms took place at this well in the early Christian period in Ireland.

Mass was obligatory for church members. A synod in Limerick in 1453 ordered that Mass was to be said in each church on each Sunday and holiday and all faithful, except the excommunicated, were to attend, on pain of excommunication. No work was allowed on Sundays and holidays. Possibly this formalised what was probably already common practice in many places. The same decree specified that the parishioners should provide the necessary church vessel, books, and vestments. The bell was to be rung three times to announce the Mass. This provides a fairly clear picture of the rules under which St Douloughs operated. A small bell may have been used at some stage, but eventually, St Douloughs got its own bell tower.

The consecrated host at that time in history was being treated with elaborate ceremonial. The Fourth Lateran Council in 1215 decreed the doctrine of Transubstantiation which reinforced the veneration and ceremonial centred on the consecrated host. Roman Catholic tradition reserves the consecrated host in a tabernacle near the altar, or in a panel attached to the wall behind the altar or hung from the ceiling. (O’Keefe, 2015) No evidence has been found that establishes which method was used.

=== The Oratory ===
The eastern room on the ground floor of the medieval building is now called The Oratory. This is agreed to be the first element to be constructed and to have functioned as a church. It is aligned east–west and the altar according to church practice would have been at the eastern end. There are no architectural features that would suggest any screen that might have existed between a nave and a chancel. The principal window in the south wall of the Oratory has been dated by Harbison at 1230 AD. There is a taller window with a pointed arch behind the altar position on the east wall, possibly dating from the same time. There is a fragment of a piscina, for washing hands and vessels. A very narrow splayed window by the southeast corner, beside the altar position is said to have been a viewing hole for lepers, who were not allowed in the church. In the west wall of the Oratory is a hole said to have been used as a cure for ailments. In the west wall are evidence of blocked-up arches, said to have led at one stage to an aisle, now gone, which was built to accommodate congregation overflow. There is clear evidence of a blocked-up door in the south wall of the Oratory. There is a recess near the altar, possibly for vessels and other ceremonial items.

== Restoration ==
The complex was cleaned and the baptistry complex in particular restored in 1991, although the Victorian church element was not a main focus of the work, which was State-funded.

== People Associated with St. Doulagh's ==
The Precentor of Christ Church Cathedral, Dublin, was the patron of the church, and provided the church with its perpetual curate (vicar). The future Bishop of Drumore Rev. Dr. James Saurin served in St. Doulaghs from 1788, as from 1850 did the Rev. Prof. J. G. Abeltshauser, Professor of French and German in Trinity College.

== Graveyard ==
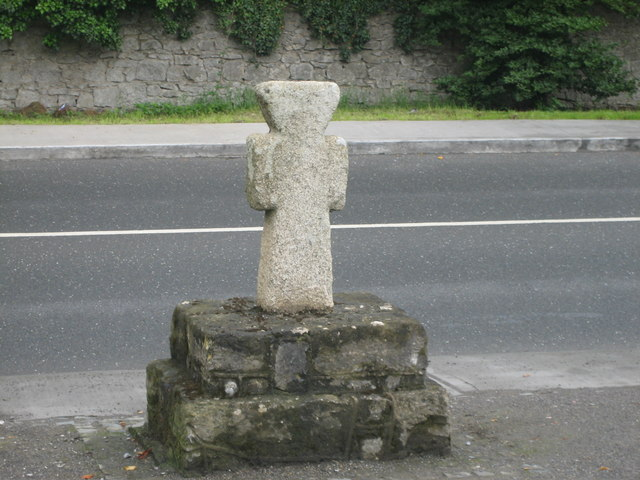
Granite cross at entrance to church

There is a graveyard outside. There are no reported excavations to date the earliest graves. Burial within such a small church, indeed any parish church would have been extraordinary and a great privilege, reserved for founder and perhaps a very important benefactor. Tradition has it that St Doulough was buried just inside the church entrance. Excavations by Leo Swan uncovered evidence of a burial under the north wall, near the altar position. In fact, burial of church founders in the north wall of churches became common in medieval Ireland, the celebrant taking his seat, as appropriate by the south wall of the chancel.

== Sources ==
- Armstrong, Robert, ‘St Doulough’s Church’ in The Dublin Penny Journal, Vol 1 No 34 (Feb 16 1834)
- D’Alton, J: History of County Dublin, (Dublin 1838)
- De Paor, L: Cormac's Chapel: ‘The beginnings of Irish Romanesque’, in (ed. E Rynne) North Munster Studies, Essays in Commemoration of Monsignor Michael Moloney (1967)
- Henry, F: Irish Art In the Romanesque Period, (1020-1170 AD ) 1970
- Harbison, Peter: 'St Doulough's Church', in Studies: An Irish Quarterly Review, Vol 71, No 281, (Spring, 1982)
- Hudson, Benjamin: Viking Pirates and Christian Princes (Oxford University Press, 2005),
- Leaske, H. G: Irish Churches and Monastic Buildings, Vol 1, 1955
- Lewis, Samuel : Topographical Dictionary of Ireland
- Moss, Rachel: 'St Doulough's Church', in Irish Arts Review, Vol. 20 No. 2 (Summer 2003)
- O’Keefe, Tadhg: Medieval Irish Buildings, Four Courts Press, 2015
- Reeves, W: ‘Memoir of the Church of St Duilech’, Proceedings of the Royal Irish Academy 7, 1859.
- Sloane, J: ‘Antiquities of Fingal, No 1, St Doulough's' in The Irish Builder, September and October 1879
- Swan, Leo: 'Excavations at St Doulough's Church', Unpublished report, Record of Monuments and Places file Nos DU00901-00906
