= The Quays Shopping Centre =

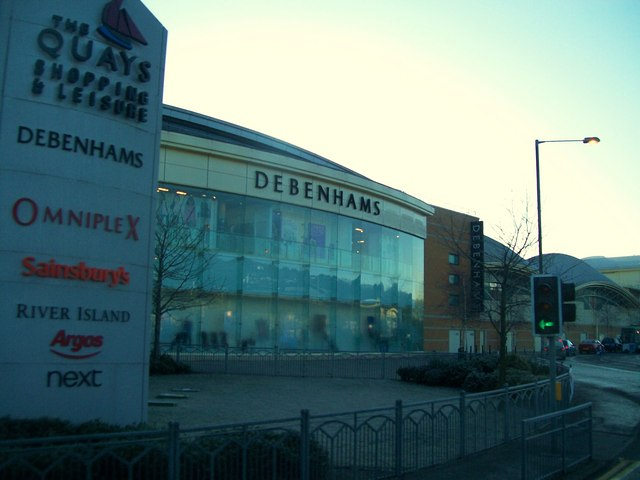
- The Quays exterior
- Location: Newry, County Down, Northern Ireland
- Opened: October 1998
- Developer: Parker Green International
- Owner: Urban Green Private; Belfast Commercial Funding
- Num. of stores: 40
- Num. of anchor tenants: 3
- Website: www.thequays.co.uk

The Quays Shopping Centre (or The Quays Newry) is a retail and leisure centre situated in Newry, County Down, its main anchor tenants are Sainsbury's and Marks & Spencer. The centre contains a 10 screen cinema operated by Omniplex Cinemas, a 24 hour gym operated by PureGym and over 1,000 car parking spaces.

== History ==
The Sainsbury's store opened in October 1998, while the rest of the centre opened in 1999. The Quays was constructed on the site of the old coal yards which served the Albert Basin. An old warehouse, which was part of these yards, was incorporated into the centre and is now used as office and retail space.

Roches Stores opened their first store in Northern Ireland in the centre in 1999, but this store was closed in February 2003 to make way for a new Debenhams store next to it which opened in October 2004, and later closed in 2021. The former Roches space became more shops.

In February 2018, Marks & Spencer relocated from the Buttercrane Centre to The Quays where a new 30,000 sq ft store was built on the site of the old Sainsbury's filling station. In the same year, owner Parker Green International sold off the centre.

During the 2020s, The Quays lost most of its tenants due to declining footfall and the COVID-19 pandemic, it went into receivership in 2022.

In September 2023, Domino's announced that they are planning to open a restaurant in the new part of the shopping centre in 2024.

In January 2024, it was announced that Urban Green Private would buy the shopping centre and Drumalane Mill for under £17m, Urban Green also owns the Marina Market and the former Our Lady's Hospital in Cork, among other properties.

In August 2025, it was reported that Urban Green could either put the centre back up for sale or put it into receivership again, the centre struggled further under Urban Green's ownership with the centre losing more tenants and struggling to attract major names. The outside area of the centre remains successful.

In March 2026, EY were appointed as administrators to UGP Newry Limited, the holding company of The Quays, the company fully collapsed into administration a month after. Urban Green later brought back the centre under the holding company UGP Newry Shopping Centre Limited on 22 April 2026.

In May 2026, UGP Newry Limited was saved from administration by Urban Green, meaning that The Quays would be placed back under the holding company. It was also shown that the centre and Urban Green were debt-ridden and has significantly downsized in the value in the centre since they brought it in 2024, going from under £17m to just £6.2m.

In June 2026, it was announced that Belfast Commercial Funding (BCF), founded by Belfast businessman Gareth Graham, would be giving a cash loan to UGP Newry Limited to support The Quays. The loan was estimated to be around £8 million. This will support a new central food court and other developments to "add to The Quays' offerings".

== Cross-border shopping ==
The centre has experienced shoppers from the Republic of Ireland, who cross the border to Newry to buy cheaper goods due to difference in currency. This remarkable increase in cross-border trade has become so widespread that it has lent its name to a general phenomenon known as the Newry effect.

== Tenants ==
=== Main area (opened in 1999, expanded in 2004) ===
- Sainsbury's (anchor tenant)
- Argos (located in Sainsbury's)
- River Island
- Waterstones
- Boots
- Farmshop Ireland (opening soon)
- Semichem
- H&M
- Superdry
- Eddie Rocket's
- Caffè Nero
- Søstrene Grene
- Sisu Clinic (opening soon)

=== Outside area (opened in 1999, expanded in 2017) ===
- Marks & Spencer (anchor tenant)
- Next
- PureGym
- O'Neills

==== Food court (opened in 1999, moved in 2026) ====
- Church Lane Coffee
- Mully's Donuts
- Patty*s Burgers
- Wing Shack

== Former tenants ==
=== Main area (opened in 1999, expanded in 2004) ===
- Poundland
- Miss Selfridge
- Skechers
- Sports Direct
- Monsoon Accessorize
- Carphone Warehouse
- Topshop
- Topman
- Trespass
- Debenhams
- HMV
- Early Learning Centre
- GameStop
- Jack&Jones
- Mexx
- PoundWorld
- Aldo
- Petroleum
- Oasis
- Make Up Pro Store
- Card Factory
- Pandora
- Burger King
- A Wear
- Claire's
- The Body Shop
- Bravo Live Cuisine
- Gymboree
- DFI Beds NI
- Flying Tiger Copenhagen
- Starbucks
- Deli-Lites
- Chopped
- Olivia’s Closet Box
- Parkgreen International
- Smiggle
- Vodafone
- Telepeformance
- Gasp Boutique
- The Barrow
- Tan City
- Lush
- O'Briens
- PoundGiant
- Card Factory
