= Belmayne =

Suburban housing development, Balgriffin, Dublin

Coordinates: 53.40395°N 6.17389°W

- Suburban housing estate
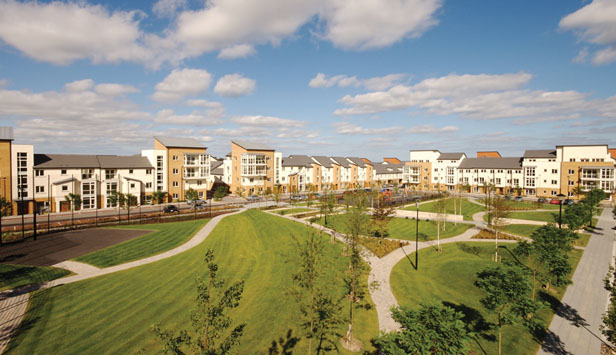
- Belmayne Park
- Interactive map of Belmayne
- Country: Ireland
- Province: Leinster
- County: County Dublin

Belmayne (Irish: Béal Maighne) is a development of housing, and adjunct facilities, in Balgriffin, a northern outer suburb of Dublin, Ireland, commenced in 2006–2007.

== Location and access ==
Around 8-9 km north-east of the city centre, Belmayne is situated in the angle of the Malahide Road and the N32, opposite the Hilton Hotel at Belcamp. It is close to the M1 and M50, motorways and Dublin Airport, via the N32. There are Dublin Bus services (27, 42, 43 and 15) on the Malahide Road, and Clongriffin DART station is around 1.5 km to the east.

Belmayne forms part of the Northern Fringe Development, as approved by the local authorities, providing new accommodation in former "green belt" land.

Adjacent housing developments in Balgriffin include Castlemoyne and St. Samson's Court, both to the north.

Belmayne lies in the administrative area of Dublin City Council.

== History ==
The development was begun by Stanley Holdings in 2006, with construction by LM Developments.

Originally a civic centre was promised, agreed between Dublin City Council and developers, on a specified block of land. Facilities, including a library, were included, but this proposal was later repudiated by the developers on economic grounds, and the lands transferred from Dublin City Council to a special government agency. No civic facilities have yet been provided by either developers or local authorities.

Belmayne was later the subject of urgent fire safety works, due to risk of fire propagation between timber-framed homes, but without the lengthy evacuation of residents experienced in nearby Priory Hall, Donaghmede. Most affected residents were only out of their homes for a few days.

Development around Belmayne "froze" for some years but was resumed in 2017.

A confidential report obtained by the Sunday Business Post and mentioned in an article published in June 2018 has raised fresh fire safety concerns about the development.

High Court action has also been initiated amongst current and former members of the owners' management company in a dispute relating to the purported mismanagement of funds.

The development also experienced significant damage when sections of the roofs over blocks of apartments were torn off during 'Storm Ali' in September 2018.

=== Promotion ===
Belmayne has been noted in the press and criticised by some members of the public for its striking advertising theme material. It was later found that the developers were non-compliant with Advertising Standards

== Facilities ==
While there are very limited retail and civic amenities inside, the estate is in walking distance of Tesco Extra-anchored Clare Hall Shopping Centre and the small Northern Cross shopping area, which includes a Fresh supermarket and a restaurant.

There are two creches (Bumblebees and Lovable Me Montessori), two primary schools (St. Francis of Assisi Primary School and Belmayne Educate Together National School), and a secondary school (Belmayne Educate Together Secondary School).

After a period being served by Belmayne Mass Centre, the area's Roman Catholic population, within Holy Trinity Parish, has its church at Donaghmede. In the Church of Ireland, St. Doulagh's Church in northern Balgriffin, serves.

== Natural features ==
The Turnapin Stream branch of the River Mayne flows through part of the development, just north of the main line of housing, meeting the other main branch of the Mayne a little to the east.
