= Stephen's Green Shopping Centre =

Retail centre in Dublin, Ireland

Coordinates: 53°20′23″N 6°15′42″W

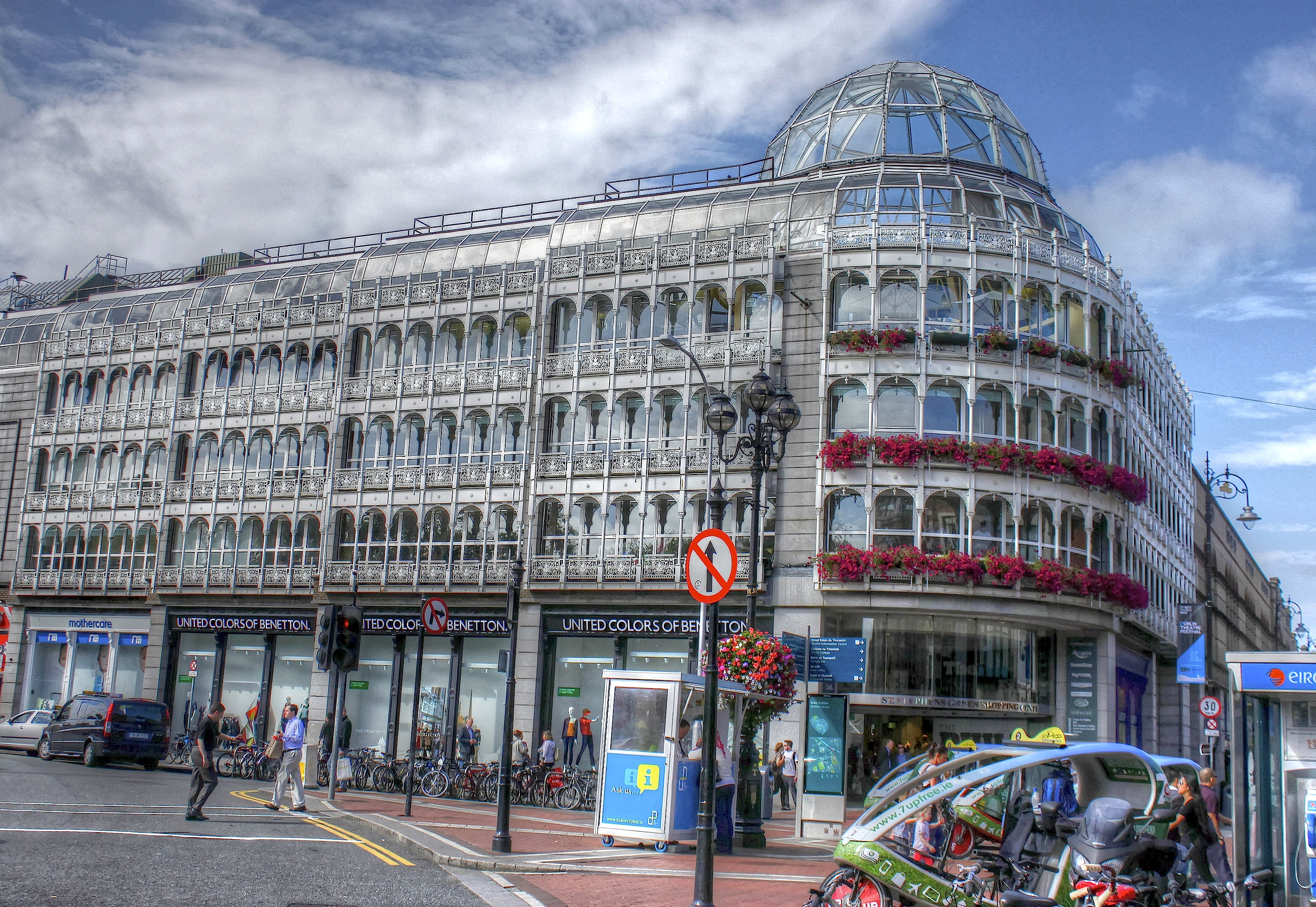
- Stephen's Green Centre, main entrance
- Location: Dublin, Ireland
- Opened: 8 November 1988
- Developer: British Land
- Owner: Lanthorn
- Architect: James Toomey
- Num. of stores: 100
- Num. of anchor tenants: 3
- Floor area: 70,000 square metres (750,000 sq ft)
- Floors: 3
- Parking: 1,200
- Website: www.stephensgreen.com

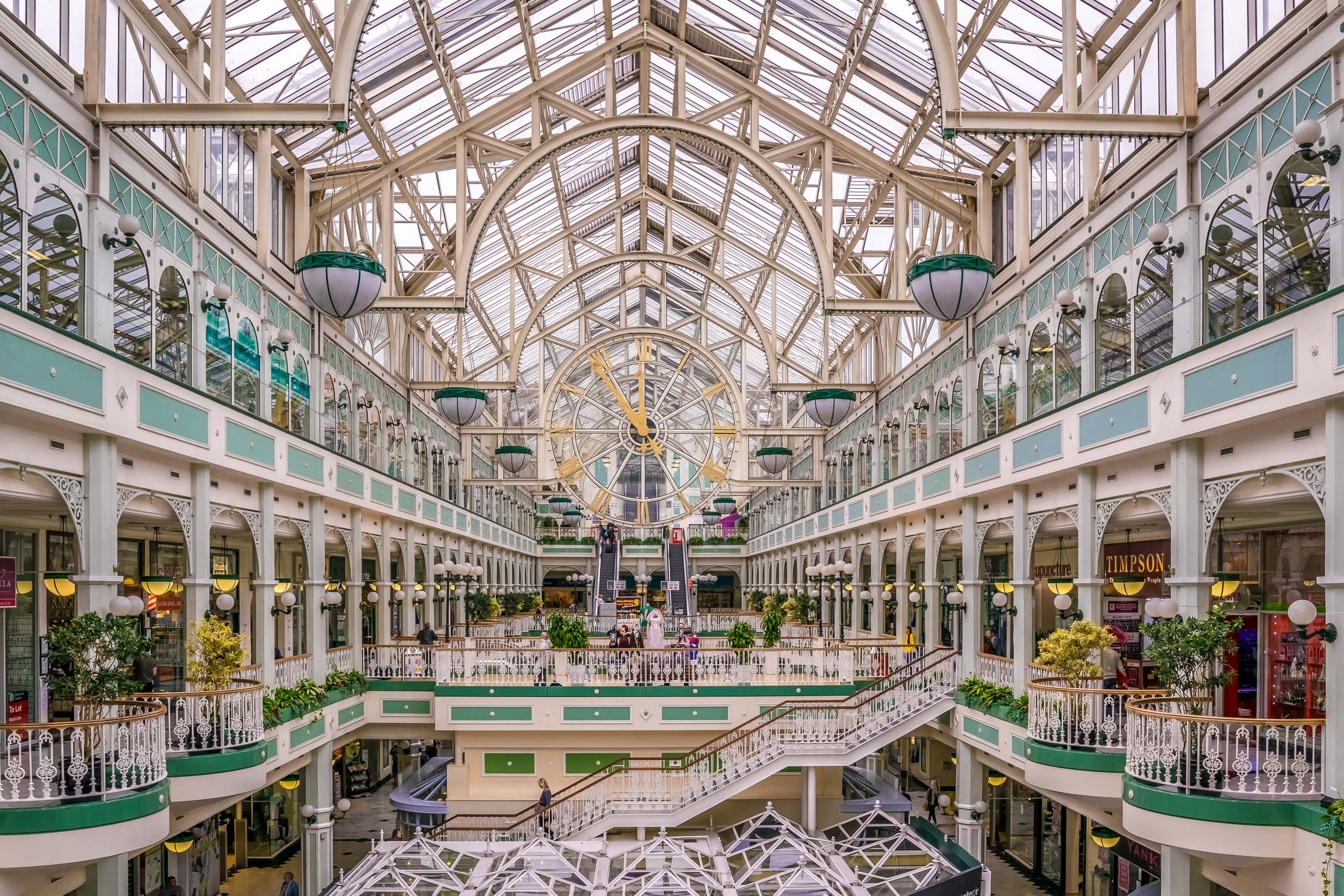
Shopping centre interior

Stephen's Green Shopping Centre is an indoor shopping centre in central Dublin, Ireland. Located on St Stephen's Green West, at the top of Grafton Street, it is named after St. Stephen's Green, a city park situated across the road from its main entrance.

== History ==
=== Site and Dandelion Market (1966–1986) ===
The site of the shopping centre was assembled over 15 years by the Slazenger family, beginning in 1966. In total, more than 150 individual property owners were bought out over that period. Most of the buildings were Georgian, and these were left to fall into disrepair and ruin as plans for an extensive redevelopment of the site as an office block and shopping centre totalling almost half-a-million square feet were drawn up. The original architects were Scott Tallon Walker, and planning permission for their scheme was granted in 1975. During the recession of the late 1970s, the small shops were rented out under a scheme known as "the Gaiety Green". At the weekends, this was marketed as the Dandelion Market, known for its alternative vendors, popular with younger people. U2 played some of their earliest gigs at the market. The market, which closed in 1981, is commemorated with a plaque, while Sinnotts Bar on South King Street is the only trader from the original site that remains.

The site was put up for sale in 1980, and was purchased by Patrick Gallagher in April 1981 for £10.5 million. Most of the buildings on the site were demolished while Gallagher attempted to sell the site to Irish Life, without success. He also sought permission to erect a show house for his Fortunestown development in Tallaght but this was rejected by Dublin Corporation. After Gallagher went bankrupt, the site was re-acquired by the Slazengers, and it was placed back on the market in 1983, and later sold for £5 million to Power Securities. They drew up plans for 7 acres of retail, bar and restaurant spaces, with 40 luxury flats and parking for 800 cars.

=== Development and construction ===
The centre in its final form was developed by British Land under a design by James Toomey.

Work began on the shopping centre in 1986, with plans for anchor and specialist shops, restaurants and bars, leisure facilities, and, at a cost of £15 million, 700 parking spaces.

=== Opening and operation ===
The project was completed in 1988, with a total budget of £50 million, and the centre officially opened its doors on 8 November that year, though with only 4 units ready on the first day. The use of glass and ornate white iron work on the exterior has been "likened to a Mississippi steamboat moored on the edge of the Green" and the building is sometimes known locally as "The Wedding Cake".

=== Changes in ownership ===
In 2019, a fund managed by Davy Group acquired the remaining portions of the property not under its ownership.

=== Redevelopment plans ===
As of 2023, plans for a significant rebuild of the shopping centre, which are due to add substantial office space and remove the distinctive "wedding cake" facade, have been approved by Dublin City Council.

== Shops ==
The centre has over 100 outlets. Major retailers include Dunnes Stores, Boots, and TK Maxx.

== See also ==
- List of shopping centres in the Republic of Ireland
