= Parker Green =

Property company of the United Kingdom

- Type: Private company
- Industry: Property, Residential Development, Commercial Development
- Founded: Northern Ireland (1997)
- Headquarters: Newry, Northern Ireland
- Website: www.parkergreen.com

Parker Green, is a multinational corporation headquartered in Newry, Northern Ireland. The company develops properties in the United Kingdom, Ireland, Western Europe, Central and Eastern Europe and the United States.

The Eastern and Central European market activities are managed from Parker Green International's office in Bratislava, Slovak Republic. The United States office is located on Park Avenue, New York City.

== History ==
The company was founded by Gerard O'Hare in 1996. Parker Green International owns among other assets, The Quays Shopping & Leisure Complex, Newry, Northern Ireland, Drumalane Mill Newry, Northern Ireland, and Fairgreen Shopping Centre, Carlow, Ireland.

The company itself claims to be "sensitive developer with regard to historic buildings and environment". In 2006, Parker Green International, represented by Gerard O’Hare, Chairman, was the sponsor of Special Olympics Ireland Games.

Parker Green's Gerard O'Hare was in third position in an Irish Independent list of the "Top Twenty Irish property tycoons".

Parker Green retains former Irish Taoiseach Bertie Ahern as an advisor. The advisory board also includes .Alf Dubs, Baron Dubs and Dennis Rogan, Baron Rogan of the House of Lords.

In 2015, the company refinanced $1 billion in loans from Cerberus Capital Management, which O'Hare described as a "a red letter day" for the Northern Irish economy.
