= Grange Abbey =

Ruined chapel now in Donaghmede, Dublin, Ireland

- Former church / chapel of the Grange of Baldoyle, once a holding of the Priory of All Hallows
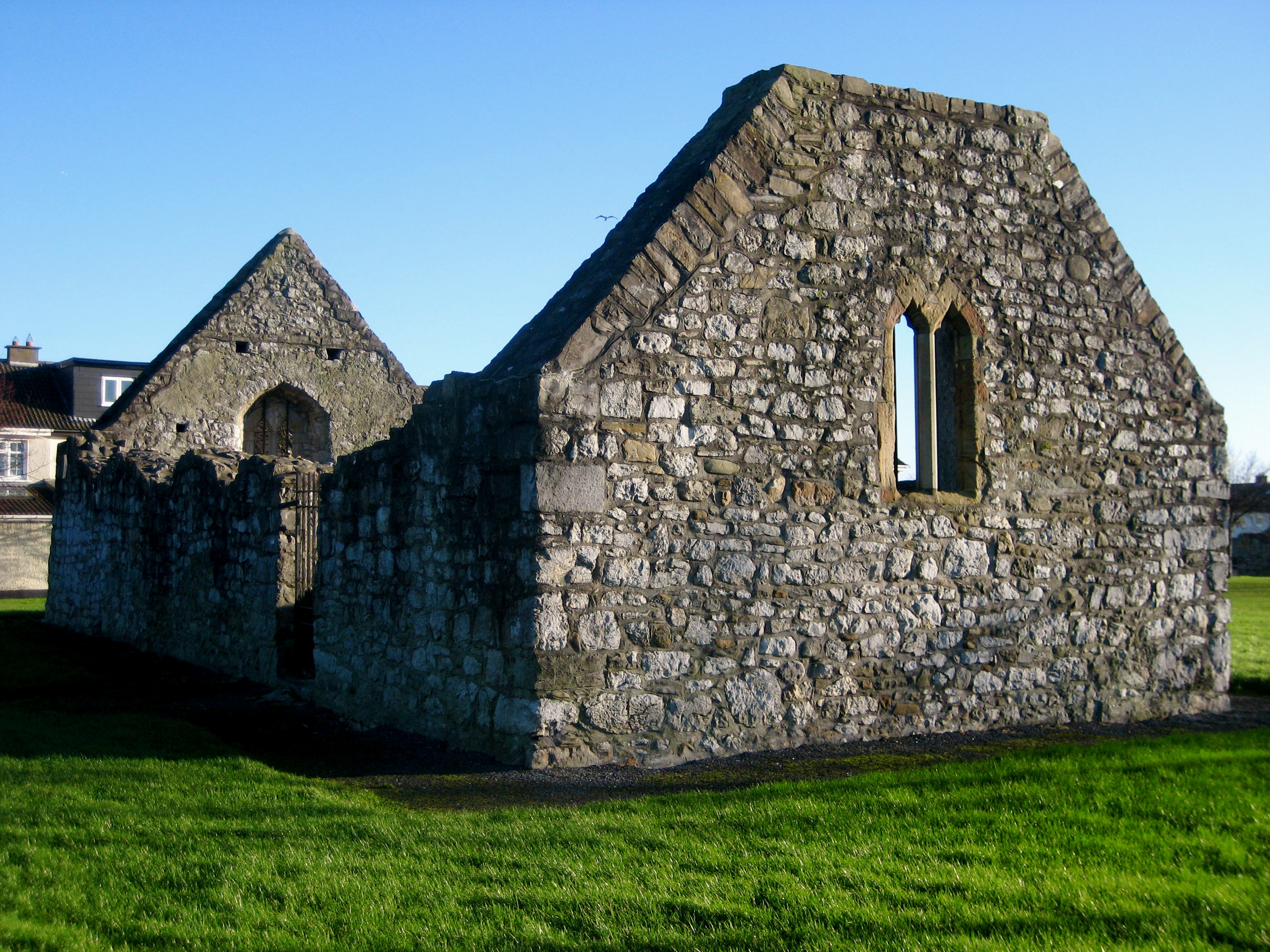
- Grange Abbey (preserved ruin)

- Location within Dublin
- 53.3990°N 6.1604°W
- Location: Donaghmede, Dublin (formerly Baldoyle)
- Country: Ireland

History
- Status: Disused since 17th century

Architecture
- Functional status: Ruined
- Heritage designation: National monument
- Completed: 14th century?

Specifications
- Length: 13.7m
- Width: 4.8m

National monument of Ireland
- Official name: Grange Abbey
- Reference no.: 605

Grange Abbey is a ruined chapel on the former Grange of Baldoyle lands, in the townland of Baldoyle, now in Donaghmede, at the northern edge of Dublin, Ireland. It belonged to the Priory of All Hallows and then, from 1539, to Dublin Corporation. Disused by 1630, it was later noted as a "picturesque ruin" and was registered as a National Monument. It was part-restored in the mid-1980s, and archaeological works were carried out in 1986 and 1999.

== History ==
The Priory of All Hallows (or All Saints) was founded by the King of Leinster, Diarmuid MacMurrough in 1166, just outside Dublin city, and to support it he gifted to Edan, the Bishop of Louth, the lands of Baldoyle with their existing tenants (and it is later noted that the priory had the rights to wrecks on the Baldoyle coast also). The priory is noted as still holding a Grange at Baldoyle in 1275 and while no early reference to a chapel or church is made, it would have been common for a monastic holding to have some such facility. One writer on the topic, Mac Giolla Phadraig, calculated, based on architecture, that the building might date from the late 13th or early 14th century.

The first explicit reference to the chapel dates from 1369, noting that the Lord Deputy of Ireland held a Parliament in "the Church of the Grange" then. A further reference is made in 1472, when a John Sherreff of Howth left money to the churches at Coolock, Raheny and "Little Grange," this last being the small chapel on the grange lands at Baldoyle. The chapel was noted as having a double-arched bell turret. In the History of Dublin Parishes booklet series, Dr Donnelly states that the lands at Baldoyle constituted the home farm of the Priory, and that the small church here was the Parish Church for the area and the priory's tenants, serfs and villeins, served by a member of the priory's brethren residing at this place.

When the Irish Reformation was followed by monastic property seizures, the "Grange of Baldowill" was assessed, and granted, in 1539, to the Corporation of Dublin as part of the property of All Saints. Aside from the small church, described as a rectory, there were 200 acres of arable land, 12 acres of pasture, 12 acres of meadow and 4 wooded acres, in addition to five cottages. While the main priory was donated by the city authorities to Queen Elizabeth for the foundation of Trinity College, the grange farm was retained by the Corporation.

The small church was repaired, by Thomas Fitzsimons, the tenant of the Grange, and others, in 1609, and had a curate, Patricus Beghan, who also served in other parishes, in 1615.

=== Ruin ===
In 1630, the archiepiscopal visitation reported that the church was ruined, only bare walls remaining, and there were no Protestants in the parish, although there was still an assigned curate - and the tenant still collected tithes, while also allowing Roman Catholic Mass to be said in his house.

Renewal of the lease of the Grange was sought in 1630 and granted by Dublin Corporation in 1638, for seventy years at 240 pounds per annum, but there is no mention of any repair to the chapel, and in 1675, the curacy of Baldoyle was merged into the parish of Howth. The chapel is mentioned again from the early to mid-19th century, as a picturesque ruin, abandoned (and without tithes), on the grounds of Grange Lodge, Baldoyle, the whole civil parish still being the property of Dublin Corporation, generating an annual rental of 4,790 pounds.

=== From the 1960s ===
Development of municipal property in the lands surrounding the abbey began in the late 1960s, with the construction of modern roads and corporation housing, but the church building was protected and has been the subject of a formal preservation order since 1981.

Across from Grange "Abbey" was The Grange House, a large stone house (thought to be Grange Lodge, and around 700 years old). The house and surrounding lands were privately owned by Raphael Hoey from 1932 and included a dairy farm, that was in operation until 1976. However the house was burned to the ground and several outbuildings including stables, a milking parlour, and cowshed, along with an orchard, were demolished shortly after the sale of the land to a developer in 1991. The rubble of the house was used to fill the last of its fish ponds.

=== Status ===
Grange Abbey is a National Monument site, with separate references for the church (DU015-069-001) and the surrounding graveyard (DU015-069-002; now landscaped and invisible on the surface).

== Naming ==
No dedication for the chapel is known, nor is it known when what might properly perhaps have been called "Grange Chapel" became popularly known as "Grange Abbey."

== Structure ==
=== Location ===
The preserved ruin is located in a green space northeast of a roundabout north of central Donaghmede, at the meeting of the R809 and R139 roads, about 1.25 miles west of Baldoyle village.

=== Form ===
The rectangular stone building, aligned east of north east, measures 13.7m by 4.8m internally, and the four walls are intact to a height of about 2.4m. The surviving stone comprises uncoursed limestone masonry, with dressed limestone quoins. There was no separation of nave and chancel. A path leads to a northern doorway (the southern doorway is blocked), and there is a fine two-section west window, the central portion of which is restoration work, while there is also a partially restored eastern two-section window. There are aumbries on each side, and a small basin at the eastern end of the southerly wall. There are also two gravestones inside.

=== Restoration works ===
Restoration work was performed on the chapel in the mid-1980s by AnCO, the then national State training authority.

== Archaeological works ==
An excavation within the chapel itself was performed in 1986, on the instructions of the Monuments Branch of the Office of Public Works, in whose care the site is vested. This was to prepare for conservation including flooring work, and included study of ground materials. One conclusion was that the original levels of the doorways would have been at least 35 centimetres (1 ft 2 in) lower than now. Many fragments of bone were found, but had been much disturbed over time. Two phases of construction, and of burial prior to the erection of the eastern wall were conjectured. A few fragments of pottery from the thirteenth century, believed to be of local manufacture, were also found, suggesting some activity but not necessarily relating to a religious building.

An excavation of a southerly part of the church site was carried out in June-July 1999, in connection with work on the M50 motorway link road, and found only light traces of Grange of Baldoyle or later estate works, due to disturbance in the 17th century. Finds included domestic refuse pits and a 1.1 metres (3 ft 7 in) wide wall. Also found were remains of a long stone drain, and a small stone "water house" that probably contained controls for water flow into fish ponds which existed adjacent until at least the nineteenth century, with at least one surviving until 1972. The last pond was filled with rubble from Grange House and when this was studied, a hoard of 41 gold sovereigns, dating from 1817 to 1830, was found. The stone drain probably drew water from the Grange Stream, a Mayne River tributary that runs just south of the site (the stream is now culverted).

== Sources ==
- Mac Giolla Phadraig, Brian, "Grange Abbey, Baldoyle." Dublin, Old Dublin Society, "Dublin Historical Record" vol. 20, no. 3/4 (June - Sept. 1965), pp. 129–132
- Joyce, Weston St. John, "The neighbourhood of Dublin: its topography, antiquities and historical associations." Dublin, M.H. Gill & Son, 1921 (third, enlarged edition; first edition
- Gallagher Desmond, "Grange Abbey and its Vicinity", Holy Trinity Parish Committee, 1975.
