= Nutgrove =

Suburb of Dublin, Ireland

Nutgrove An Garrán Cnó (Irish)
- Suburb
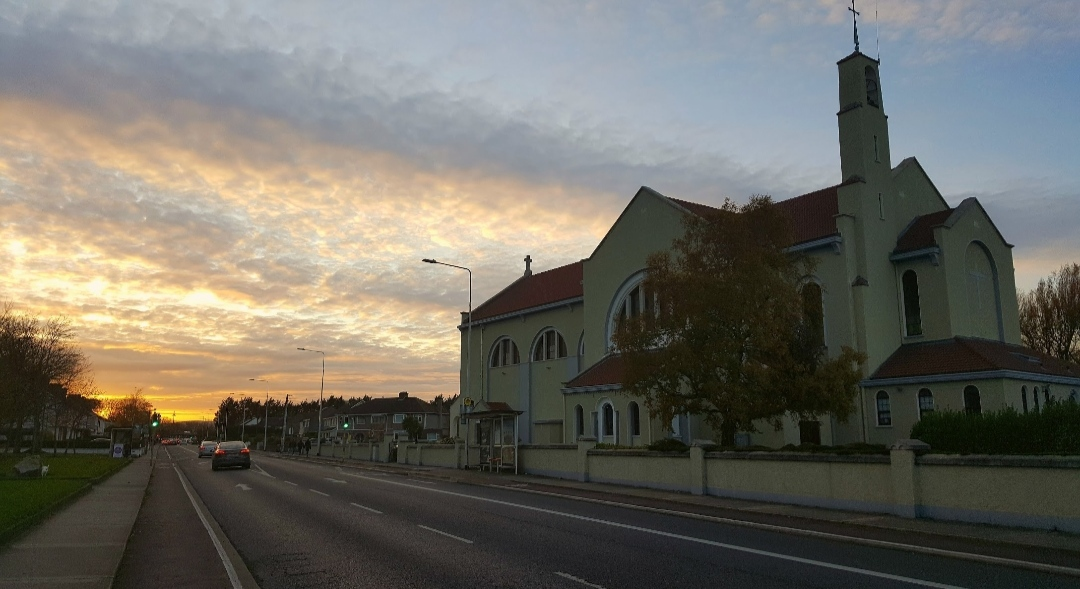
- Good Shepherd Church and surrounding houses on Nutgrove Avenue

- Location in Dublin
- Coordinates: 53°17′32″N 6°16′16″W
- Country: Ireland
- Province: Leinster
- County: County Dublin
- Local authority: Dún Laoghaire–Rathdown County Council
- Elevation: 64 m (210 ft)

Nutgrove (Irish: An Garrán Cnó) is a suburban area of Dublin, Ireland. It is located at the foot of the Dublin mountains between Churchtown and Rathfarnham near the Nutgrove Shopping Centre.

== Amenities ==
The area was previously the home of the HB ice cream company. HB was originally an abbreviation for Hughes Brothers' Dairy, now produced by Unilever and part of the Heartbrand. The HB Dairies premises the area were demolished in 2005 and replaced with several new retail units, apartments and office space. Tenants of the retail units include The Range (formerly Homebase), Harvey Norman, Aldi and Harry Corry.

Loreto Park, opposite Nutgrove Shopping Centre, routinely hosts a circus during the summer months. The park also hosts home games of Leicester Celtic and Nutgrove Celtic. Leicester Celtic also have a floodlit, all-weather pitch located off the Barton Road Extension close to Grange Manor and Grange Downs.

Primary schools in the area include the Good Shepherd National School, Divine Word National School (Marley Grange), Rathfarnham Educate Together National School, and St. Mary's Boys National School.

== Transport ==
Nutgrove is served by Dublin Bus routes 14 (Dundrum Luas to Ardlea Road), 14c (Dundrum Luas to Eden Quay) and 74 (Dundrum Luas to Eden Quay via Whitechurch). The area is also served by Go-Ahead Ireland routes S6 (to Tallaght), S8 (City West to Dun Laoghaire via Sandyford Industrial Estate) and 161 (Dundrum Luas to Rockbrook).

== People ==
William Domville Handcock (1830–1887), a descendant of William Handcock of Westmeath who was educated at Nutgrove School in Rathfarnham, was a magistrate for County Dublin and wrote The History and Antiquities of Tallaght in the 1870s.
