= Donaghmede Shopping Centre =

Shopping centre in suburban northeastern Dublin

- Coordinates: 53.395°N 6.162°W
- Address: Grange Road, Donaghmede, Dublin 13
- Opened: 1973; 53 years ago
- Num. of anchor tenants: 1
- Floors: 2
- Parking: yes
- Public transit: DART
- Website: www.donaghmedesc.com

Donaghmede Shopping Centre is a mid-size shopping centre located in Donaghmede, a suburb in Dublin's Northside.

The shopping centre is built on the site of the original Donaghmede House. The shopping centre had an H Williams supermarket as original anchor but was sold to Dunnes Stores in 1987. Dunnes moved the entrance inside the centre, and operates a two-storey anchor unit. The centre has over 600 car parking spaces, 50 shops, two levels of shopping, a petrol station, a McDonald's restaurant in the car park, a cafe, a public branch library, and floor space of 17,398 m^{2} (187,269 sq ft). It has annual footfall of 3.2 million.

== Redevelopment plans ==
Proposals to redevelop the shopping centre were under discussion for some years and as of 2007, permission for some redevelopment was given.

== Rail access ==
- Howth Junction
