= Donaghmede =

Residential suburb of Dublin, Ireland

Donaghmede Domhnach Míde (Irish)
- Suburb
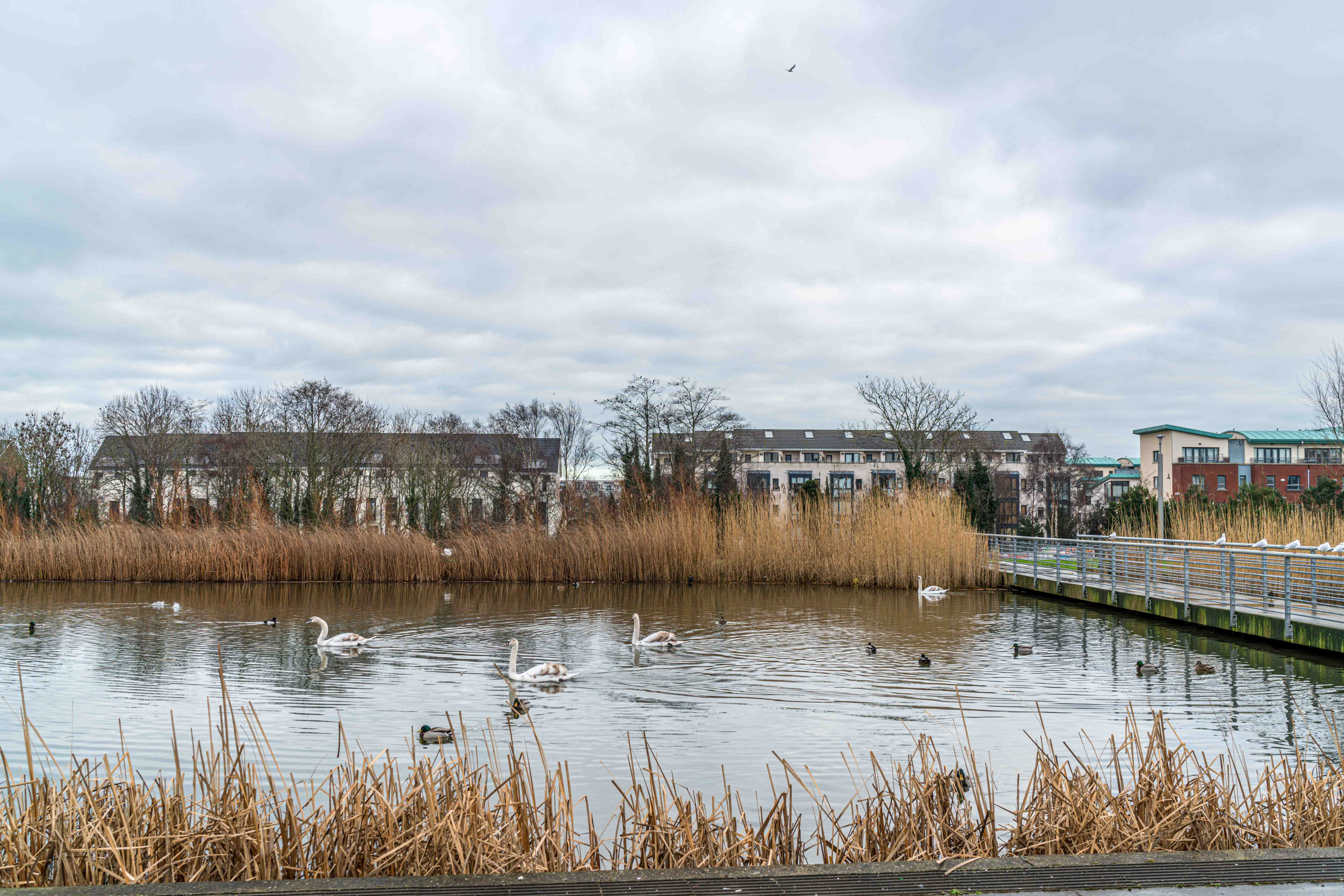
- View from Father Collins Park
- Interactive map of Donaghmede
- Location in Ireland
- Coordinates: 53°23′41″N 6°9′43″W
- Country: Ireland
- Province: Leinster
- County: County Dublin
- Local authority: Dublin City Council
- Time zone: UTC+0 (WET)
  - Summer (DST): UTC-1 (IST (WEST))
- Eircode routing key: D13

Donaghmede (Irish: Domhnach Míde, meaning 'St Mide's Church') is a mixed socio-economic residential suburb on the northern side of Dublin, Ireland, formed from parts of Baldoyle, Coolock and Raheny in the 1970s. It contains a mid-size shopping centre and a ruined chapel.

== Geography ==
Donaghmede is around 8 kilometres (5 mi) to the north east of Dublin city centre. The suburb lies west of Baldoyle from which it was largely formed, north of Raheny, east of Coolock and Balgriffin and south of Portmarnock. Donaghmede is in the constituency of Dublin Bay North.

In the northern part of Donaghmede is the Grange Stream, running in a culvert from western Donaghmede, past Grange Abbey and flowing into the Mayne River in northern Baldoyle. Flowing through the southern parts of Donaghmede is another stream, the Kilbarrack Stream and/or Daunagh Water, culverted in stage in the 1970s and 1980s. It reaches the sea at two points in lower Kilbarrack / Bayside, though in earlier times it joined with the Grange Stream and ultimately flowed into the Mayne River, feedback Baldoyle Bay.

== History and naming ==
Donaghmede was formed by Dublin Corporation, which owned most of the lands, from around 1970, built-up from housing developments it had commenced on the inland areas of Baldoyle. Some lands of Coolock and some addressed as Raheny were also involved. The first housing estates were built by the Gallagher Group for Dublin Corporation. Further estates were added over the following decades.

The name of the newly-designated area was taken from the "big house" located in its assigned centre, Donaghmede House.

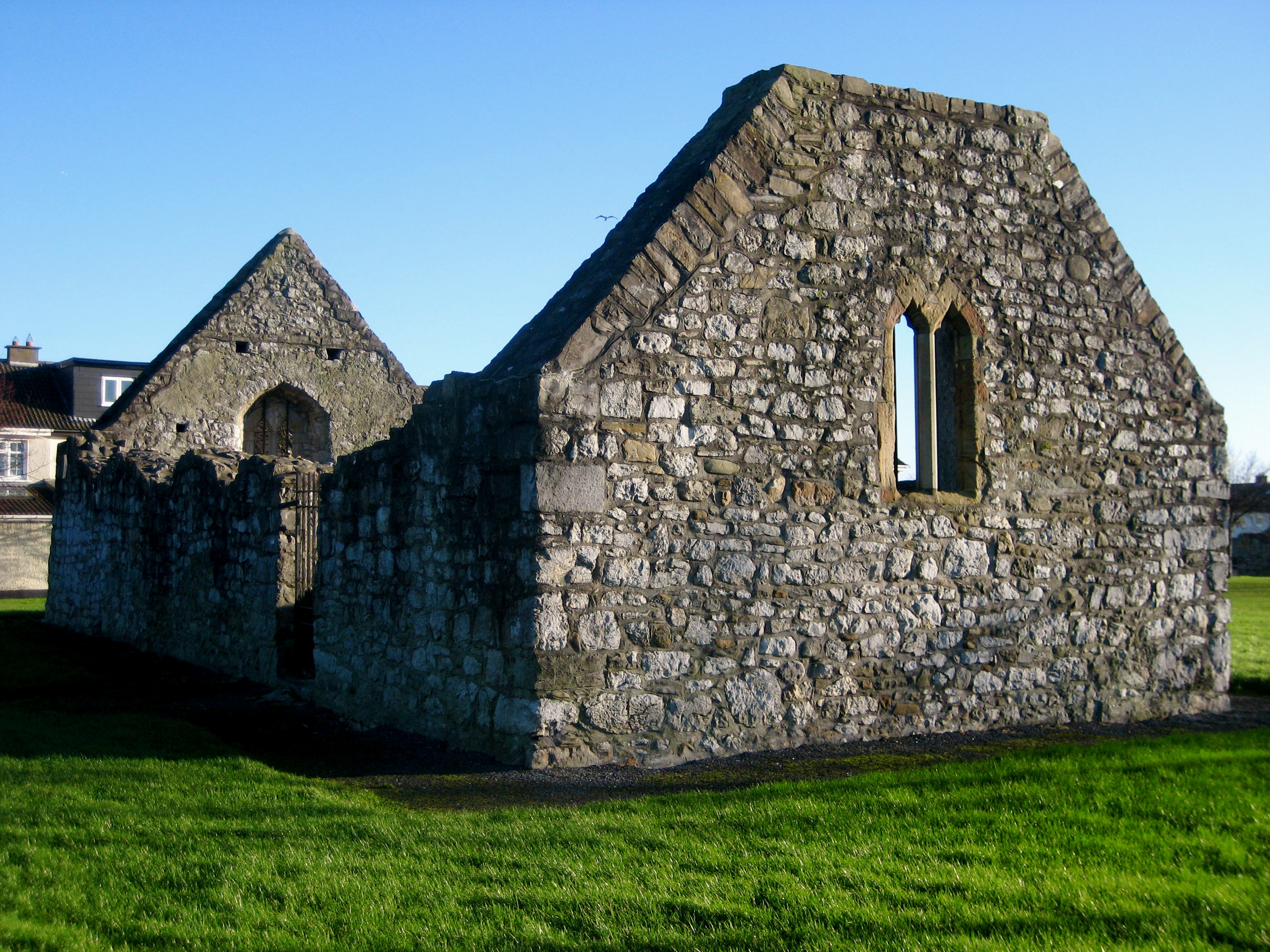
Grange Abbey

The once popular Saint Donagh's Well, a holy well, was regularly visited for hundreds of years. It is said that the waters of Saint Donagh's Well healed eyes and rejuvenated eyesight. Saint Donagh's Well was once one of three local holy wells which were visited in procession. The well was still extant in 1958, but by 1970 there was no remains left of it following the culverting of a local stream.

In the northern part of Donaghmede is Grange Abbey, historically "a small church within the Grange of Baldoyle" which served as a chapel for the lands of the Priory of All Saints (now the site of Trinity College Dublin). The chapel, which once hosted a small parliamentary meeting, has been in ruins since at least 1615.

== Facilities and amenities ==
=== Parks ===
The redeveloped Father Collins Park was officially opened by the Lord Mayor of Dublin in May 2009 and has been described as Ireland's first "sustainable park" with five 50KW wind turbines protruding from the central linear water feature and providing power for public lighting, maintenance depots and football club changing rooms. The park also features a skate park, two playgrounds, six playing pitches, picnic areas with outdoor chess/draughts boards, natural woodlands and a peripheral running/cycling track.

=== Education ===
There are four primary (two junior, Scoil Bhride and St Kevin's, two senior, Holy Trinity and Naomh Colmcille) and three secondary schools (Grange Community College, Donahies Community School and Gaelcholáiste Reachrann) in the area, and two "vertical" schools – catering for children from Junior Infants to Sixth Class – St Francis of Assisi Primary School and Belmayne ETNS – in the Belmayne estate in nearby Balgriffin.

There is also a Dublin Public Libraries branch library in the local shopping centre.

=== Sport ===
There are a number of soccer and Gaelic football clubs in the area along with the local Sports and Leisure Centre. These include Wyteleaf United, Trinity Gaels Gaelic Athletic Association (GAA) club, and Trinity Donaghmede FC (previously called "Donaghmede Celtic and Trinity Sports and Leisure Football Club") as well as newly formed F.C. Donaghmede who play home games out of Father Collins Park, while past clubs have included Carndonagh Athletic Football Club and Grange Abbey Boys FC. Trinity Boys Boxing Club is also based in the area.

=== Retail ===
Donaghmede Shopping Centre stands on the site of the original Donaghmede House. Dunnes Stores is the anchor tenant along with 50 other shops, a cafe and a branch of Dublin City Libraries. The Donaghmede Inn pub and some other shops have direct access from outside. Near Donaghmede Shopping Centre is a medical centre with a pharmacy and café, and there is a small shopping precinct in Clare Hall, between Donaghmede, Ayrfield and Coolock.

== Religion ==
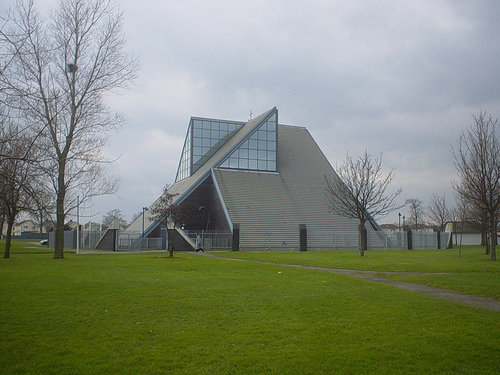
Holy Trinity Parish church, Donaghmede

Holy Trinity Parish Church, a distinctive cruciform building with a triangular profile, is Roman Catholic. Located on Grange Road, Holy Trinity Church serves the combined ecclesiastical parish of "Donaghmede-Clongriffin-Balgriffin" in the Roman Catholic Archdiocese of Dublin. A large mosque and Islamic cultural centre was planned for the Clongriffin housing development, and received planning permission, confirmed on appeal but was abandoned.

== Transport ==
=== Road ===
Donaghmede is served by Grange Road [R809](to Baldoyle and Howth) and R139 from the Malahide Road and M50 and M1, to the north, and the Tonlegee Road (R104) to the south.

=== Rail ===
In the southeastern corner of Donaghmede is Howth Junction & Donaghmede railway station, situated on the Dublin–Belfast railway line and served by Dublin Area Rapid Transit (DART) and occasional InterCity (Iarnród Éireann) trains, while in the northern part is Clongriffin railway station.

=== Bus ===
Dublin Bus provides services on routes H1 (from the city centre), N6 from Kilbarrack Industrial Estate to Blanchardstown Shopping Centre via (Coolock, Santry, Ballymun and Finglas), 15 from Clongriffin to Ballycullen Road (via Malahide Road, City Centre, Rathmines and Terenure), and the 32X Nitelink service with late night service from D'Olier Street to Baldoyle Road, stopping on Grange Road.

== Politics and community representation ==
Since 2016, Donaghmede has been part of the Dáil Éireann constituency of Dublin Bay North.

Donaghmede is part of the local electoral area (LEA) of the same name for Dublin City Council, along with Ayrfield and parts of Raheny, with five elected local councillors. In 2019, Fianna Fáil took two of the seats, with one each going to Fine Gael, Sinn Féin and the Green Party. The area was previously part of a larger LEA, Beaumont-Donaghmede.

== Residential ==
Unlike many other suburbs of Dublin, Donaghmede was not a village absorbed by suburban sprawl; rather it was an area of farmland, with a number of large houses with attendant workers' cottages (many of these latter survive along the Hole in the Wall Road that leads to Portmarnock, but none of the original "big houses" exist today).

Within Donaghmede are a number of housing developments, Donaghmede Estate, Grangemore, The Donahies, Grange Abbey, St Donagh's, Millbrook, Newgrove Estate and Howth View. The bulk of these developments were constructed between circa 1970 and 1974. Newer developments included apartments at Priory Hall, and opposite those a number of developments forming Clongriffin.

=== Priory Hall ===
The apartment development at Priory Hall in northern Donaghmede was evacuated by order of the High Court made 14 October 2011, to allow for emergency fire safety works. The 294 residents were originally due back by 28 November 2011, but as of May 2020, only some have been able to return. The landowner and Tom McFeely, the owner of the construction company, are both bankrupt, with the latter first attempting to file for bankruptcy in the UK. This bankruptcy was overturned when it emerged that his main dwelling and business interests were in Ireland. Declared bankrupt in Ireland in 2012, his €15m home in Ailesbury Road, Dublin 4, was re-possessed. In September 2013, €140,000 in €50 notes was found under the bath of his former Ailesbury Road house. The find is being probed by the Criminal Assets Bureau. While most of the former residents were originally placed in a hotel, many were later rehoused in National Asset Management Agency property a couple of hundred metres to the east in Clongriffin, or to the west in the Belmayne development, south Balgriffin.

== Notable residents ==
- Ryan Andrews, Fair City actor
- Stephen Carr, football player with Birmingham City F.C.
- Pamela Connolly, vocals/guitar/bass in Pillow Queens
- Damien Dempsey, folk singer
- Keith Duffy and Shane Lynch of Boyzone
- Shane Lynch, singer and racing driver
- JJ McCormack, champion cyclist and cycle sports official
- Kasey Smith and Leigh Learmont of band Wonderland

== See also ==
- List of towns and villages in Ireland
