= Balgriffin =

Northside suburb of Dublin, Ireland

Balgriffin Baile Ghrífín (Irish)
- Suburb
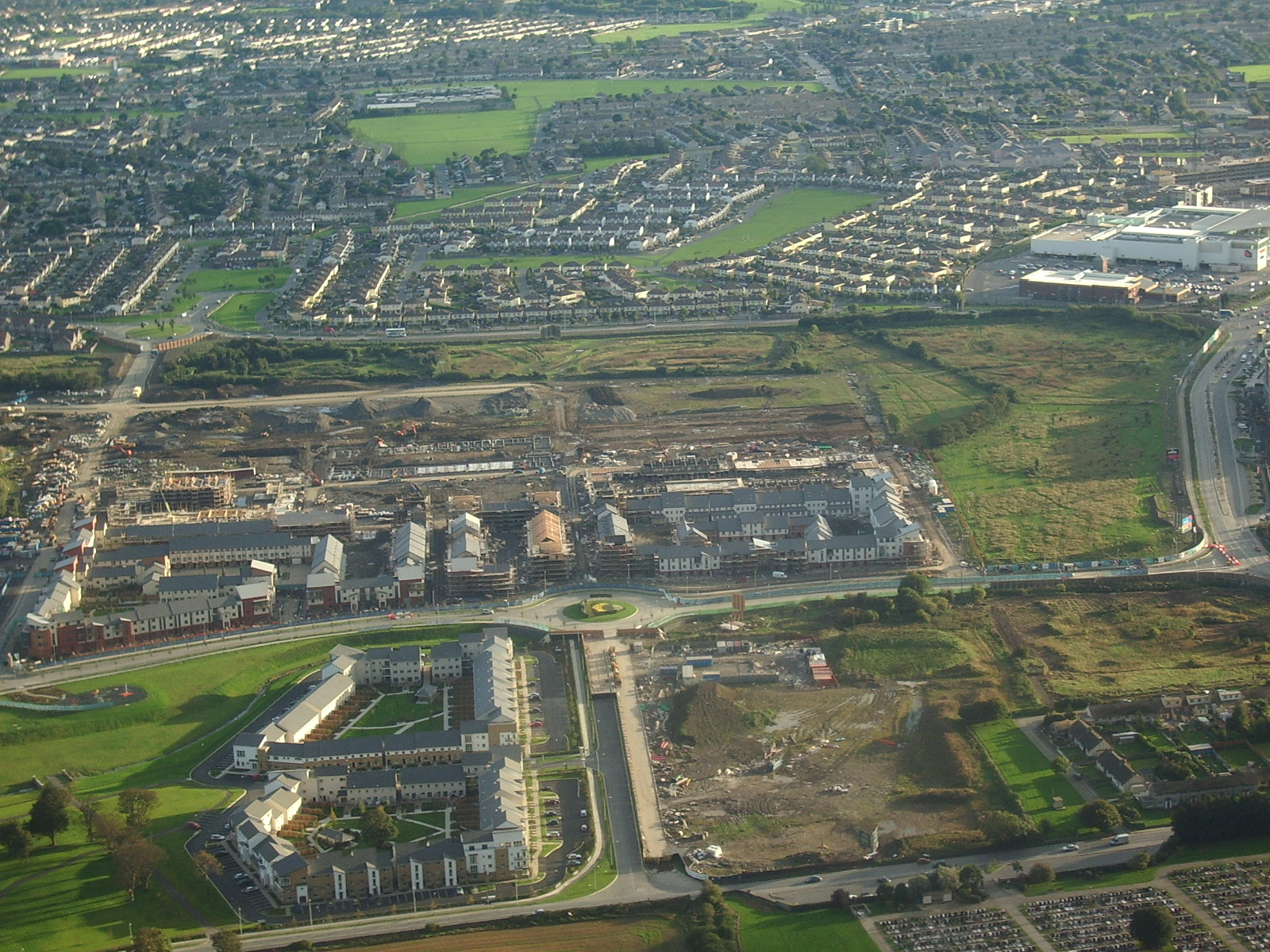
- Aerial photo showing Balgriffin, including Belmayne, in the immediate foreground, with the Donaghies housing estate and more of Donaghmede in the background

- Location in Dublin
- Coordinates: 53°24′32″N 6°10′41″W
- Country: Ireland
- Province: Leinster
- County: County Dublin
- Local authority: Dublin City Council, Fingal County Council
- Elevation: 18 m (59 ft)

Balgriffin (Irish: Baile Ghrífín, meaning "Griffin's town") is a suburb of Dublin, Ireland. It lies on the administrative boundary between Dublin City and Fingal in County Dublin.

Balgriffin is also a civil parish in the ancient barony of Coolock.

== Location ==
Balgriffin is situated approximately 8 km (4.97 mi) from Dublin city centre. It is a civil parish of 540 acres in the barony of Coolock. For elections to Dáil Éireann, it is in the Dáil constituency of Dublin Bay North. It is in the Dublin 13 postal district.

The area's local government administration is divided between Dublin City Council and Fingal County Council.

== Geography ==
The two main branches of the Mayne River (sometimes referred to as the "Moyne"), the Turnapin Stream and the Cuckoo Stream, run through the plains of the district, picking up smaller streams. The Turnapin flows in the southern part of the area, coming from the old Belcamp Estate and running north of the main Belmayne development, while the Cuckoo comes east near Limekiln Lane and forms the northern boundary of the Fingal Burial Ground. Flooding sometimes hits Limekiln Lane. The Turnapin and the Cuckoo merge in eastern Balgriffin and the Mayne then flows out to Baldoyle Bay (Balgriffin Road becomes Moyne Road as it approaches the coast).

== Access and transport ==
The hamlet of Balgriffin is served by Balgriffin Road from the east (Portmarnock), the R139 from Dublin Airport and Donaghmede on its southern edge, and by Malahide Road from the north (Kinsealy and Malahide) and south (Dublin city centre, Fairview and Coolock).

Dublin Bus provides the district of Balgriffin with services on the 15, 42 and 43 routes, the cemeteries being served by the 42 and 43.

== History ==
Balgriffin is an old district that can be found on maps, many held in Dublin City Archive and Dublin County Archive, going back hundreds of years. In 1388 Robert Burnell, judge of the Court of Exchequer, was lord of the manor of Balgriffin; his descendants who were also lords of the manor of Castleknock, were still at Balgriffin in the seventeenth century. Historically, it has remained as a lightly settled area of fields with a hamlet at a crossroads, at which now stands an 18th-century public house, some cottages, a village green and hall, and two cemeteries – the older of which is to the west, the newer, civic, one to the east. In 1542, Henry VIII granted Conn Bacach O'Neill an estate in Balgriffin as a part of the settlement of surrender and regrant that granted the former King of Tir Eoghan the new titled of Earl of Tyrone.

The best-known feature of the area is the early St Doulagh's Church; it is also said that magnate de Burgo (Burke) had a base close by.

=== Development ===
Until recent years a small rural settlement, Balgriffin experienced several developments, including St. Samson's and Castlemoyne, and most notably the substantial one called Belmayne, infamous for its provocative advertising, and which remains unfinished. This development was, in February 2011, the subject of urgent fire safety works, but without the evacuation of residents experienced in nearby Priory Hall, Donaghmede.

== Amenities ==
The historic pub has been joined over the last decade by shops and eating facilities in southern Balgriffin.

== Features ==
Approximately 1 km (0.62 mi) north of the hamlet of Balgriffin is St Doulagh's Church. At first a monastery, it is now a well known and much revered Church of Ireland church. It was built in the 5th century and renovated in the 12th century.

At the time of its inception, the Welsh Saint Samson made a pilgrimage to Dun Etair (Irish: Binn Éadair) (Contemporary Howth) and is said to have founded the monastery that is now St Doulagh's Church. The church was originally under the patronage of St. Samson. As Balgriffin was in the past referred to as Ballygriffin and Griffinstown, the place name indicates that it was indeed settled by a Welsh person.

== Religion ==
St Doulagh's Church, Balgriffin has been serving Anglican parishioners since the Reformation in Ireland.

Donaghmede Parish served Balgriffin Roman Catholic parishioners since its inception in 1974, with a Mass hall and then Holy Trinity Church. The parish is today known as Holy Trinity Parish and serves Donaghmede including Clongriffin, and Balgriffin including Belmayne. With the growth of population as the Belmayne housing development was populated, Balgriffin Mass Centre was opened, operating from the information centre on Belmayne Avenue, but this no longer functions.

== Sources ==
- Bond, A. and Mabin, N., Article drawn from "Saints of the British Isles"
- Jones, Kathleen, Saint Samson of Caldey Isl, Wales & Dol Isl, Brittany (Catholic Ireland Net)
- Hudleston, G. Roger, Saint Samson (Catholic Encyclopedia)
