= Nutgrove Shopping Centre =

Mid-size suburban shopping facility, Rathfarnham, Dublin, Ireland

- Coordinates: 53°17′25.1″N 6°16′1.9″W
- Address: Nutgrove Way, Rathfarnham, Dublin 14, D14 P8F7
- Opened: 1984
- Parking: 1,000
- Website: https://nutgroveshoppingcentre.ie/

Nutgrove Shopping Centre is one of two shopping centres located in Rathfarnham, a southern suburb of Dublin. The centre opened in 1984 and was built on part of the old Lamb's Jam orchards. The centre has nearly 1,000 free surface car parking spaces, 70 shops, 5 restaurants, food court and cinema.

Europe's first McDonald's drive-through restaurant opened at the centre in 1985.

Nutgrove Shopping Centre is directly served by bus routes S6 & 161 by Go-Ahead Ireland and nearby by Dublin Bus route 14.

Nutgrove Retail Park, next to the shopping centre, is a newer retail area with larger (though fewer) stores.

== See also ==
- Nutgrove
- List of shopping malls in Ireland
