= Harmonstown =

Locality in Dublin, Ireland

Harmonstown Baile Hearman (Irish)
- Suburb
- Location in Ireland
- Coordinates: 53°23′02″N 6°11′47″W
- Country: Ireland
- Province: Leinster
- County: Dublin
- Local authority: Dublin City Council
- Elevation: 27 m (89 ft)
- Time zone: UTC+0 (WET)
  - Summer (DST): UTC-1 (IST (WEST))
- Eircode routing key: D05

Harmonstown (Irish: Baile Hearman) is a small suburban locality of Dublin, Ireland, located on its Northside. It straddles the boundary between modern-day Artane and Raheny. It has a population of 5,566 inhabitants as of 2016

== Location ==
Historically what is now Harmonstown was mostly in Raheny. The locality is bounded by the railway cutting, the Santry River within the Springdale Road Linear Park, and Brookwood Avenue. The Naniken River also crosses the area, in culvert, passing the railway by siphon.

Harmonstown is located south of Artane and Coolock, and is accessed by a railway bridge from the Ennafort / Cill Eanna part of Raheny, and faces the Edenmore part. It also borders Killester and Clontarf.

== Amenities ==
The area contains Harmonstown DART station, located on the mentioned railway bridge, the Dublin 5 An Post sorting office and, at the northern edge, one of Artane's churches; Harmonstown is divided between Raheny and Artane parishes in the Roman Catholic Church, and between the Parish of Raheny and the Parish of Coolock in the Church of Ireland. The townland of Harmonstown is within the civil parish of Clontarf but did not form part of the short-lived Clontarf Urban District.

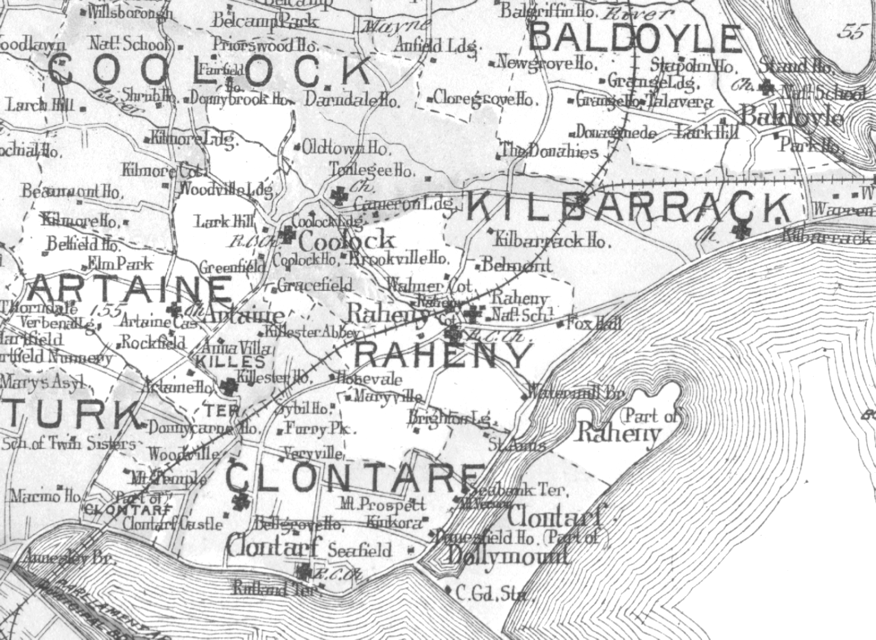
Present day Harmonstown can be seen within Raheny

On Harmonstown Road itself are shops, cafes, a pub, a Ford main dealer, a number of gyms and other businesses.

== Transport ==
Harmonstown railway station opened on 27 January 1957.
