= Stardust fire =

Nightclub fire in Artane, Dublin

Coordinates: 53°23′03″N 6°12′52″W

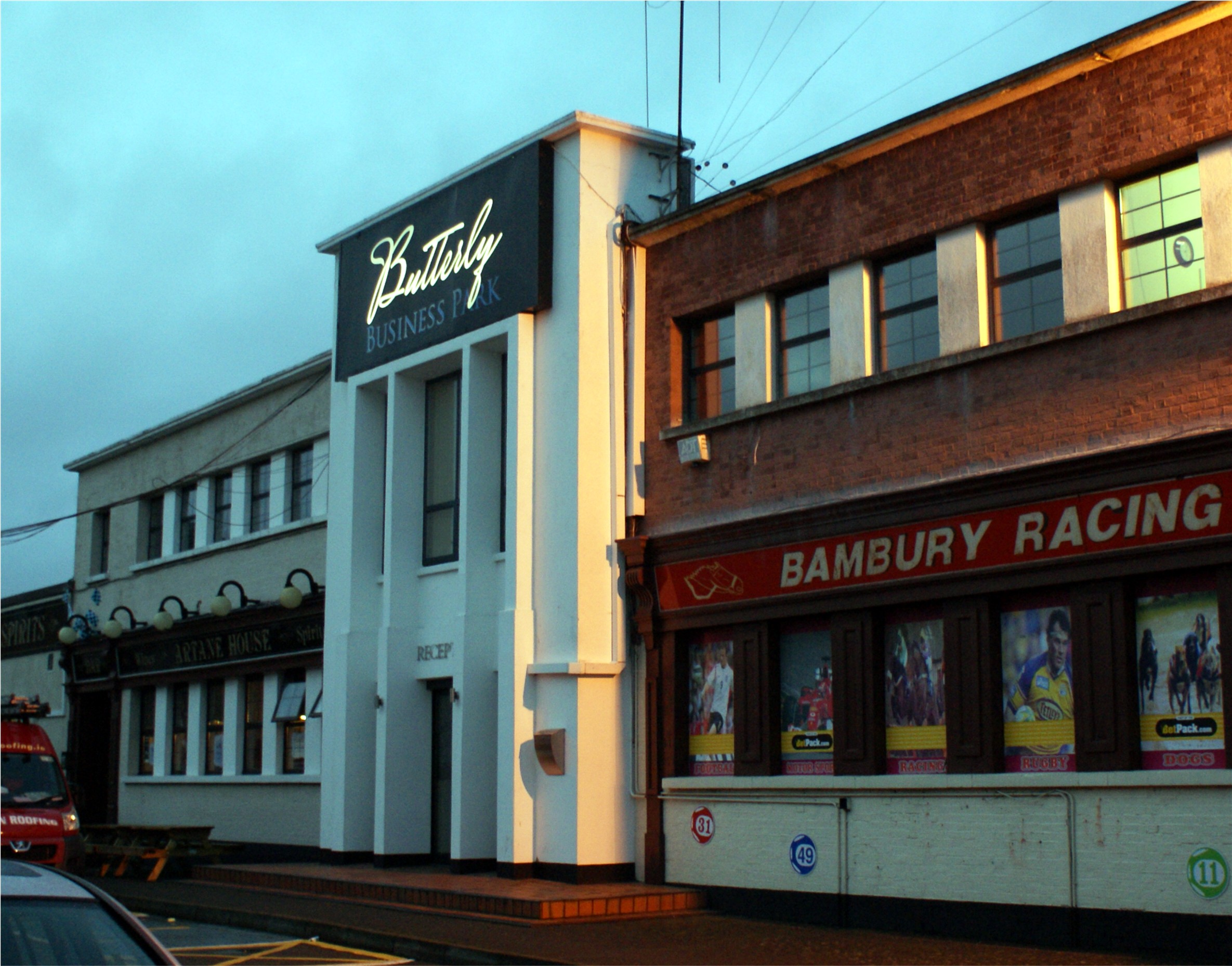
- Butterly Business Park, site of the former Stardust building. Some of the front facade of the original building remains.
- Date: 14 February 1981
- Venue: Stardust nightclub
- Location: Artane, Dublin, Ireland
- Type: Fire
- Cause: Electrical fault
- Deaths: 48
- Injuries: 214

The Stardust fire was a fatal fire at the Stardust nightclub in Artane, Dublin, Ireland, in the early hours of 14 February (Saint Valentine's Day) 1981. More than 800 people were attending a disco there, of whom 48 died, and 214 were injured as a result of the fire; in later years suicides of survivors and family members were also linked to the event.

The club was located in what was formerly known as Butterly Business Park, now renamed Artane Business Park, opposite Artane Castle Shopping Centre. The escape of the disco attendees was hampered by chains and padlocks on multiple exits, barred windows, and failure of the lighting system. Attendees at another event in the same building escaped without loss of life. A small part of the building including most of the front elevation remains today but the remnants of the nightclub section have been demolished.

Initially, the cause of the fire was not conclusively determined; an initial determination of arson was later just one of a number of hypotheses, and unproveable. Due to the arson finding, and despite criticism of safety points, the owners of the building claimed and received public compensation, and were not liable to civil action from the families of the deceased, and survivors. No charges were brought against any party for the causing of the fire or the loss of life. After reviews and years of campaigning, in 2019 it was announced that fresh inquests would take place for the 48 victims, and these commenced in 2023. In 2024 the Dublin District Coroners Court found, in a majority verdict, that all 48 people died as a result of unlawful killing.

The Stardust Memorial Park was built in Bonnybrook, Coolock, on the banks of the Santry River, some distance from the site of the disaster, and later a monument was also established at the Stardust site. Multiple documentaries related to the fire have been made.

== The nightclub ==
The building which housed the Stardust was built in 1948. It was initially a food factory, operated by Scott's Foods Ltd. In 1978, the owners of Scott's, the Butterly family, converted the premises into an amenity centre, consisting of a bar, The Silver Swan, a function room, The Lantern Rooms, and a nightclub, The Stardust. The club premises consisted of a dance floor, a stage, two bars and two seating alcoves, the North Alcove and the West Alcove. There were also tables and chairs on the dance floor area. The West Alcove area had enough seats for at least 280 people.

== Fire ==
=== Beginning ===
The fire occurred on 14 February 1981 around 1:30 am, with multiple patrons noticing the fire in different locations and times in the nightclub. There were 841 patrons in the nightclub for the St Valentines eve disco event, and the owners had been given a Special Exemption Order to serve alcohol between 11 pm and 2 am. For the exemption to be given the event was billed as a "dinner dance".

The fire outbreak is believed to have derived from an electrical fault in the room beside the roof space. This non-planning-permission-compliant first-floor storage room contained dangerously flammable materials, including 45 five-gallon (23 litre) drums of cooking oil. Staff observed a small fire outbreak on a seat in an alcove behind a curtain and they attempted to extinguish it but failed.

The blaze reportedly originated from the storeroom and spread to the roof. The flames breached the roof tiles, emerging into the nightclub's West Alcove, a banked seating area. The fire descended onto the backrest and the top of a seating bench, which was covered in PVC-coated polyester fabric. The incident was first noticed by a patron seated in front of the West Alcove, who observed a rise in temperature but did not detect any smoke.

=== Spread ===
The fire then spread to tables and chairs, and patrons noticed smoke and smelled burning. The fire was very small when first seen in the Ballroom. By 1:45 am, a ferocious burst of heat and thick black smoke started quickly coming from the ceiling, causing the material in the ceiling to melt and drip on top of patrons and other highly flammable materials, including the seats and carpet tiles on the walls. The fire flashover enveloped the club and the lights failed. This caused mass panic as patrons began desperately looking for an escape. The DJ, Colm O'Brien, announced that there was a small fire and requested a calm evacuation.

=== Problems escaping ===
The attendees at a trade union function occurring in the same building escaped, but the escape of the Stardust patrons was hampered by a number of obstructions. Of five emergency exit doors, most were locked by padlock or chains or blocked by tables or vehicles outside to prevent individuals sneaking in. The windows were sealed with metal grilles and steel plates, which could not be removed by sledgehammers, axes, and even tow-ropes from individuals outside attempting to help. Firemen attempted to pull off the metal bars using a chain attached to a fire engine, but were unsuccessful. The failure of the lighting in the club led to widespread panic, causing mass trampling as many patrons instinctively ran for the main entrance. Many people mistook the entrance to the men's toilets for the main entrance doors, with responding firemen locating between 25 and 30 of those trapped in the front toilets. A survivor recounted later that in the panic he watched people run in different directions in the pandemonium, and that after evacuating the building he returned and helped others evacuate before tripping and being trampled.

=== Emergency services ===
The fire was first spotted by numerous people outside the building, including a woman 200 metres away, who quickly called the fire brigade. Within minutes of her call, two calls were made from inside the Stardust building to inform the fire brigade of a small fire six inches (150 mm) high on a seat in the ballroom in the west section of the building. A young man named Peter O'Toole made a phone call to the Gardaí at Dublin Castle at 1:42 am to report a handbag theft. The call was terminated by O'Toole as the first alarm of fire was given to the people in the foyer. The call was as follows:

Gardaí: Hello, yes, hello.
O'Toole: I'm at the Stardust disco. Can you hear me?
Gardaí: Yes.
O'Toole: And my girlfriend's handbag was robbed.
Gardaí: Your girlfriend's handbag was robbed?
O'Toole: She's the manageress in the shoe shop in Northside Shopping Centre.
Gardaí: Wait now would you....Stardust?
O'Toole: Yes, I'm in the Stardust disco, discothèque, and my girlfriend's bag went missing, someone's after taking it. Can you hear me?
Gardaí: Yes.
O'Toole: Can you hear me?
Gardaí: And where were you... where were... the guards, where will you meet the guards?
O'Toole: Pardon?
Gardaí: What's your name... what is your name?
O'Toole: Hello?
Gardaí: What is your name?
O'Toole: [screams in background, caller hung up]"

Ambulances from Dublin Fire Brigade, the Eastern Health Board, Dublin Civil Defence, the Red Cross, the Order of Malta Ambulance Corps, St John Ambulance Ireland and the Airport Fire Rescue Service were dispatched to the scene. The first fire engine responded around 1.51 am and responders discovered bodies piled on top of each other inside the doors. Many ambulances left the scene carrying up to 15 casualties. CIÉ also sent buses to transport the injured, and local radio stations asked people in the vicinity with cars to come to the club. The city's hospitals were overwhelmed by the influx of injured and dying, in particular the Mater, Jervis Street and Dr Steevens' Hospitals.

Family members of victims stated there was no organised transport or support shortly after the fire. They were aided by taxi drivers who waived their fares for the families and were met by ill-prepared Gardaí at the city morgue.

== Victims ==
The fatalities included 48 people in total; 46 in the fire and two later on, with the last recorded death occurring on 11 March 1981, and 214 injured. The ages of those who were killed ranged from 16 to 27, and in 23 cases the deceased were the eldest and sole breadwinner for their families. Most of the dead came from Artane, Kilmore and greater Coolock, and half of the deceased were aged 18 or younger, with four aged 16 and eight aged 17.

The fire was subsequently linked to the attempted suicides of about 25 people. The families of the victims and survivors fought in the courts for compensation, accountability, and justice. Victim compensation at the time was a total of £10.4 million paid to 823 individuals; five individuals received £100,000 or more, 24 received slightly more than £50,000 and the majority of individuals received between £5,000 and £10,000. Parents who lost a child in the disaster received a maximum of £7,500.

In 2007, the bodies of five victims who had been unable to be identified were exhumed from a communal plot in St. Fintan's Cemetery, Sutton. The remains were identified with modern DNA analysis, and then given separate burials.

== Investigation ==
=== Initial inquiry ===
The investigation at the time reported that the fire was arson. A tribunal of inquiry under Justice Ronan Keane, which held its first public meeting 12 days after the fire, concluded in November 1981 that the fire was probably caused by arson. This finding, which was disputed at the time and since, legally exonerated the Butterlys from responsibility. The finding of arson was dismissed in 2009, as there was never any evidence to support the finding. Despite making the arson finding, the inquiry was damning in its criticism of the safety standards. Keane criticised the Butterlys and the management of the Stardust for "recklessly dangerous practices" when it was discovered that some emergency exit doors had been locked on the night of the fire; nonetheless, no one was ever prosecuted or successfully sued for these practices.

=== Compensation tribunal ===
In 1986 a separate tribunal, called the Victims Compensation Tribunal, was headed by Judge Donal Barrington, solicitor Noel Smith and barrister (now Judge) Hugh O'Flaherty, to focus on monetary compensation for the victims and their families. The three men wrote an opinion after hearing testimony from survivors, victims' family members and friends and coworkers, which called the treatment of the victims after the fire 'neglect' as many had received no medical support.

=== Demand for new investigations ===
In 2009, four relatives of those who had died held a sit-in in a security hut at Government Buildings. They were asking the government to publish a report that examined the need to open a new investigation into the disaster. Following these protests, the government commissioned an independent examination by Paul Coffey SC of the case submitted by the Stardust Victims Committee for a Reopened Inquiry into the Stardust Fire Disaster.

=== Cause unknown ===
Due to the passage of time and lack of physical evidence, the examination's report stated that it would not be in the public interest to reopen the public inquiry, but that the public record should be altered to reflect paragraph 6.167 of the original inquiry:

"The cause of fire is not known and may never be known. There is no evidence of an accidental origin: and equally no evidence that the fire was started deliberately"

instead of that of arson (which led to the Butterlys' compensation). Following its publication, the Dáil voted on the evening of 3 February 2009 to acknowledge that the arson finding was hypothetical and that none of those present at the Stardust nightclub can be held responsible for the blaze. This led to a correction of the public record and the original arson conclusion was removed as the cause, due to there being no evidence to suggest that the fire was started maliciously.

=== New inquests ===
In June 2018, a campaign was launched to gather signatures on postcards supporting an appeal to the Attorney General of Ireland to finalise the coroner's reports on the deaths of the 48 killed in the fire. On 25 September 2019, the Attorney General confirmed that fresh inquests would be held into the deaths.

The inquests into the 48 deaths began at Dublin District Coroners Court in April 2023. On the first day, there was discussion about the appropriate order in which to call witnesses.

On 18 April 2024, the jury of the inquest returned a majority verdict of unlawful killing of all 48 people.

=== Redress scheme ===
On 9 August 2024 the Government of Ireland signed off on a €24 million redress package for the Stardust families.

== Aftermath ==
The owners, the Butterly family, pursued a claim for compensation against the city because of the arson finding, and were eventually awarded IR£580,000.

The aftermath led to a huge number of recommendations being made in relation to fire safety including, ultimately, the enactment of the Building Control Act, 1990 which for the first time in Ireland created a national system for Building Control. Prior to the 1990 Act, the legislation governing the fire safety of buildings used for public assembly dated back to the Dublin Corporation Act 1890 which imposed a maximum fine of £50. Comparisons were made to the Summerland disaster of 1973 in the Isle of Man and the lessons learned in that jurisdiction.

=== Memorials ===
On 18 September 1993, the Stardust Memorial Park in Bonnybrook, Coolock, Dublin was officially opened by then Lord Mayor of Dublin, Tomás Mac Giolla.

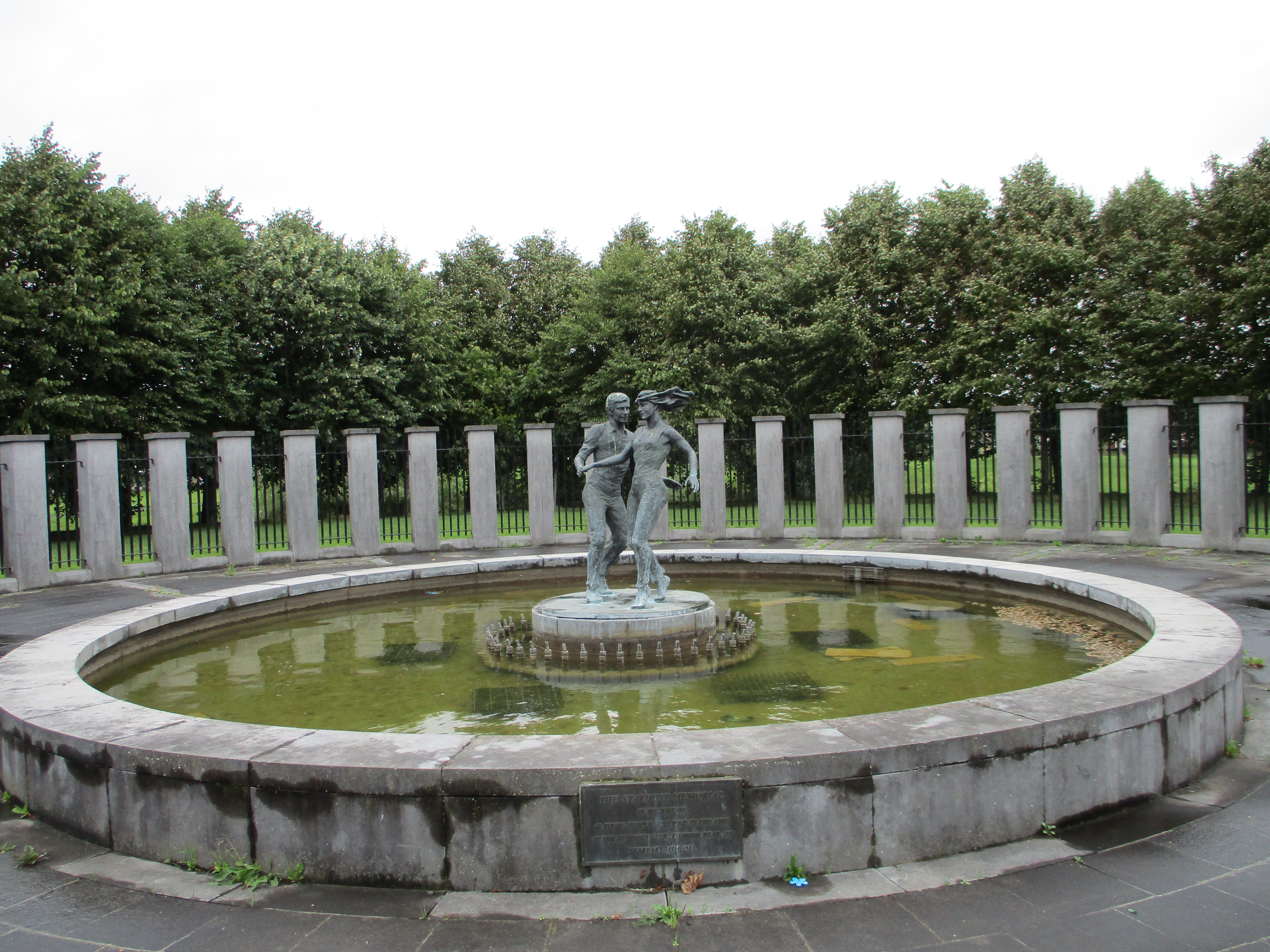
Dancing Couple memorial in Stardust Memorial Park

In 2006, the leaseholder and manager of the Stardust at the time of the fire, Eamon Butterly, planned to re-open licensed premises on the site of the Stardust on the 25th anniversary. Described as "insensitive", this action occasioned protests by the victims' families and their supporters. The protests lasted for 10 weeks and ended when the Butterly family agreed to erect a memorial on the site, and change the name of the pub from "The Silver Swan" to the "Artane House". The name "The Silver Swan" was the name of a pub attached to the nightclub, and so was rejected by the protestors.

On 13 February 2011, there was an afternoon Mass at Saint Joseph's Church in Coolock and a wreath was placed at the Stardust Memorial Park. The following evening, a candlelight vigil was held at the Stardust grounds.

== Depiction in media ==
=== "They Never Came Home" ===
In July 1985, Irish folk singer Christy Moore was found guilty of contempt of court after writing and releasing a song, titled "They Never Came Home", about the plight of the victims, seemingly damning the owners of the nightclub and the government. The song was released on the Ordinary Man album and as the B-side of a single in 1985. The song claimed, "hundreds of children are injured and maimed, and all just because the fire exits were chained". Mr Justice Murphy ordered the Ordinary Man album to be withdrawn from the shops, and costs were awarded against Moore. "Another Song Is Born" was recorded for the album's re-release. "They Never Came Home" later appeared on his box set and on the album Where I Come From.

=== Television ===
In 2006, Ireland's national broadcaster, Raidió Teilifís Éireann (RTÉ), caused controversy by producing a docu-drama about the disaster entitled Stardust, to mark the 25th anniversary of the incident. The series was based on the book They Never Came Home: The Stardust Story by Neil Fetherstonhaugh and Tony McCullagh. Many families of victims objected to this and were upset by the painful memories it brought up. Reasons for objection included the depiction of the fire and a perceived focus on some key families, which some felt portrayed the disaster as only impacting a select few.

An edition of Prime Time, RTÉ's current affairs programme, broadcast on 14 February 2006, cast doubts on some of the findings of the original tribunal. The programme produced witnesses who were outside the building on the night. Some outside saw fire coming from the roof up to eight minutes before those inside did. New evidence concerning the building's contents and layout was also presented. Other details presented included the actual location of a storeroom containing flammable materials and cleaning agents. The plan of the building, which the tribunal used and which was critical to its findings, was shown to be confusingly flawed by locating the storeroom on the wrong level. It showed the storeroom to be "over the basement", but there was no basement in the building, and the store and lamp rooms were located in the roof space on the first floor. The list of contents of the store was not put before the inquiry and included large amounts of flammable materials, including polishes and floor waxes, with the inquiry assuming only normal everyday items were inside. A re-enactment of the fire suggested that it did not happen as the tribunal had found. The programme theorised that the fire started in the roof space where the storeroom was located and had already spread across the main nightclub roof space area before those inside were aware of it.

In early 2011, close to the 30th anniversary of the fire, a documentary was aired on TV3. The documentary, titled Remembering Stardust: 30 Years On, reflected on the events of the night of the fire, the aftermath and the various controversies and legal proceedings that followed. Survivors Jimmy Fitzpatrick and Antoinette Keegan along with retired Dublin fireman Paul Shannon were among those interviewed.

In December 2017, RTÉ broadcast a one-hour episode of a TV series where survivors of the fire and relatives of some of the 48 people who died were interviewed by Charlie Bird. Bird had been the first journalist to the scene of the fire in 1981.

On 2 February 2022, TG4 interviewed Lisa Lawlor on their show Finné. Her parents died in the fire when she was just 17 months old.
