= Darndale: The Edge of Town =

- Also known as: ‘The Benefits Estate’ in the United Kingdom
- Genre: Documentary film series
- Country of origin: Ireland

Production
- Production locations: Darndale, a housing development in Coolock, north Dublin

Original release
- Network: TV3, Channel 5
- Release: 15 September 2014—present

Darndale: The Edge of Town is a documentary series based on the housing estate Darndale within the large suburb of Coolock, in the north of Dublin, Ireland.

From an area challenged by high unemployment, and crime and drug issues, the residents of Darndale share their own stories - for example, in the first episode, local man Stephen Clinch explains how the estate has changed over the years, and a single mother tries to cope with her three-week-old baby.
