= Stardust Memorial Park =

Memorial park in Coolock, Dublin, Ireland

- Páirc Chuimhneacháin Stardust
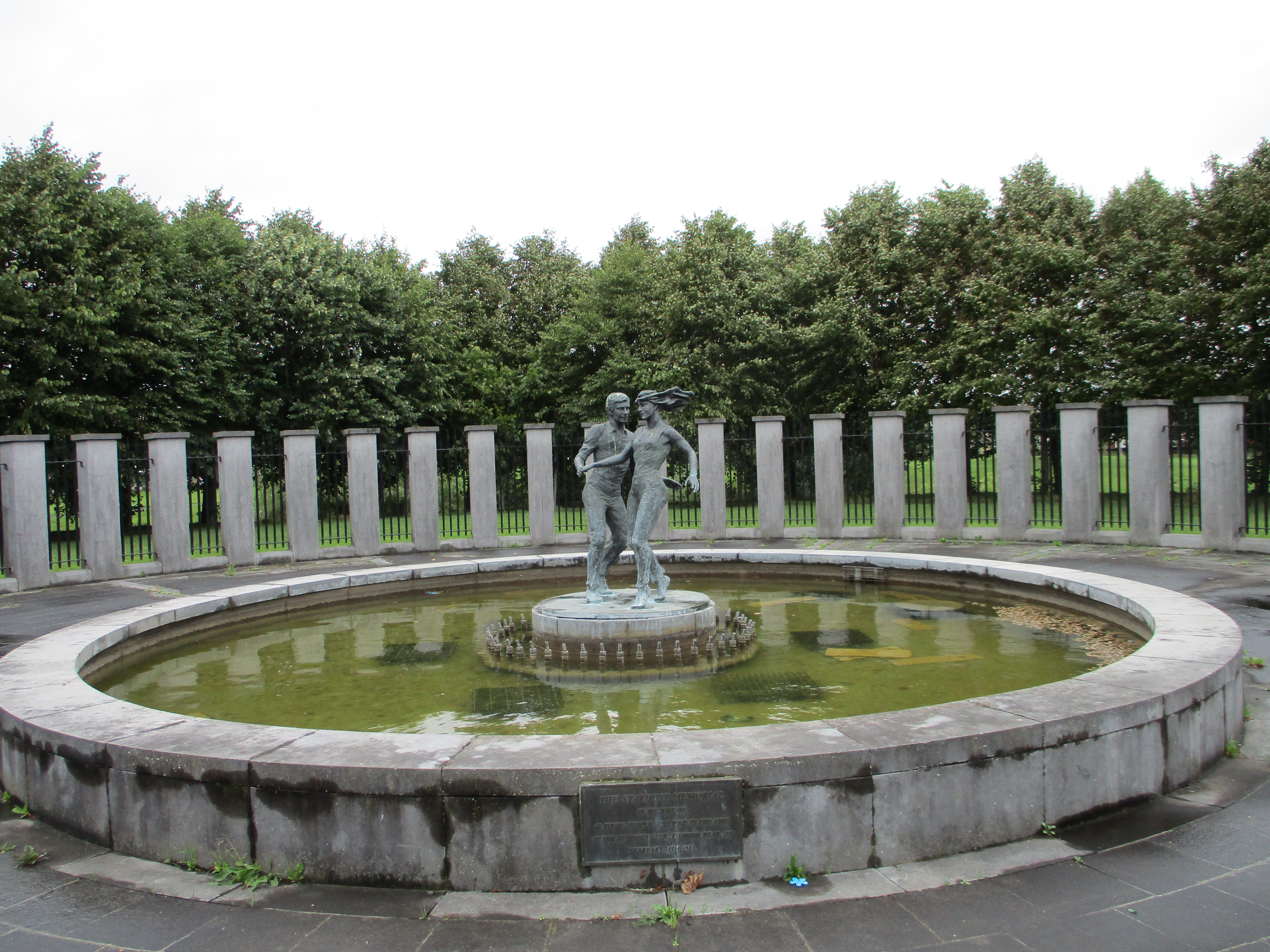
- Dancing Couple memorial

- Location within Dublin
- Type: Memorial park
- Location: Coolock, Dublin, Ireland
- OSI/OSNI grid: O 19456 39942
- Coordinates: 53.3961°N 6.2050°W
- Area: 26 acres (11 ha)
- Elevation: 40 metres (130 ft)
- Opened: 18 September 1993; 33 years ago
- Plants: 8,050 broadleaved plants
- Designation: Commemorating the lives of those who died in the 1981 Stardust nightclub fire
- Groundbreaking: 30 May 1991

Stardust Memorial Park (Irish: Páirc Chuimhneacháin Stardust) is a memorial park located in Coolock, Dublin, Ireland which was built to commemorate the lives of those who died in the Stardust night club fire on 14 February 1981.

== History ==
The park comprises 26 acres along the Santry River on land which was originally a 12th-century monastic site.

Five years after the fire, in 1986, it was agreed that a memorial would be made to remember those who died. The sod turning ceremony took place on 30 May 1991 by the then Taoiseach Charles Haughey and his son Seán Haughey, followed by an open-air mass.

=== Development ===
The design was prepared in 1991 and consisted of a combination of contract work, direct labour and a community youth training project which was operating through FÁS. The cost of the park was around £300,000. The major works were carried out by Dublin Corporation's Parks Department with input from various divisions.

The park is enclosed with a mild steel railing on a plinth wall, and the entrances are defined by piers of limestone which are of a similar design to that used in the memorial.

=== Delays ===
While the groundbreaking had occurred in May 1991, there was no progress at the site for months. By October 1991, Stardust Relatives Committee chairperson Christine Keegan spoke about the upset she felt when she visited the site to see no progress having been made. Construction on the park later began in February 1992.

On 7 November 1992, Michael Smith, the Minister for the Environment, stated that they had taken measures to ensure that work would resume as soon as possible on the memorial park following progress abruptly stopping at the site two weeks beforehand due to the budget concerns by the Dublin Corporation. The government had decided to fund the remainder of the project following the 1992 Irish general election.

=== Memorial ===
In late 1991, Dublin Corporation held a competition for sculptors to create a sculpture to go in the memorial fountain. They later held an exhibition in the nearby Coolock library showing nine memorials for the victims on the 11th anniversary of the tragedy, 14 February 1992. One of the sculptures on show was by Robin Buick, a sculptor from Monkstown, and this was chosen for the memorial.

The memorial, called the Fountain of Youth, represents a circular pool with a bronze sculpture of a dancing couple in the middle. The water is pumped by 48 jets in the illuminated fountain which surrounds the sculpture.

On 12 February 1993, 48 birch trees were planted around the memorial, one for each person who died in the tragedy, by the then Lord Mayor Gay Mitchell.

=== Opening ===
The park was officially opened on 18 September 1993 by the then Lord Mayor, Tomás Mac Giolla.

=== Facilities ===
The park has a playground, an all-weather football pitch (which was renovated by Dublin City Council in late 2015) and a garden terrace with seating. Various bridges are placed over the Santry River which runs directly through the park into a small lake in the middle where a small island is present which is home to many birds including swans and ducks.

=== Issues and refurbishment ===
By 1997, there was an increasing amount of drug dealing occurring in the park, particularly to children and teenagers, as well as used syringes being found around the site. In 2001, the Santry river was flooded with silt that had been dumped by private developers. As a result, wildlife fled from the area and vermin had accumulated. The estimated cost of restoring the pond was £10,000.

Beginning in early 2020, the park was refurbished ahead of the 40th anniversary of the Stardust nightclub fire by the means of thousands of bulbs being planted throughout the park. As well as this, the other works consisted of some trees being removed, a butterfly bank being added and new paths being created. Noting the park's association with anti-social behaviour, the Dublin City Council highlighted the issue and recognised that their first undertaking was to ensure that the users of the park felt secure.

As well as the refurbishments, a dedicated gardener was assigned to maintain the upkeep of the park. The memorial itself has been cleaned and restored to its former glory and two benches have been added near the memorial itself.
