= Clarehall Shopping Centre =

Shopping centre in Dublin, Ireland

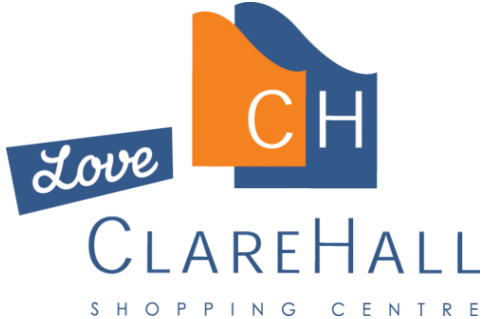

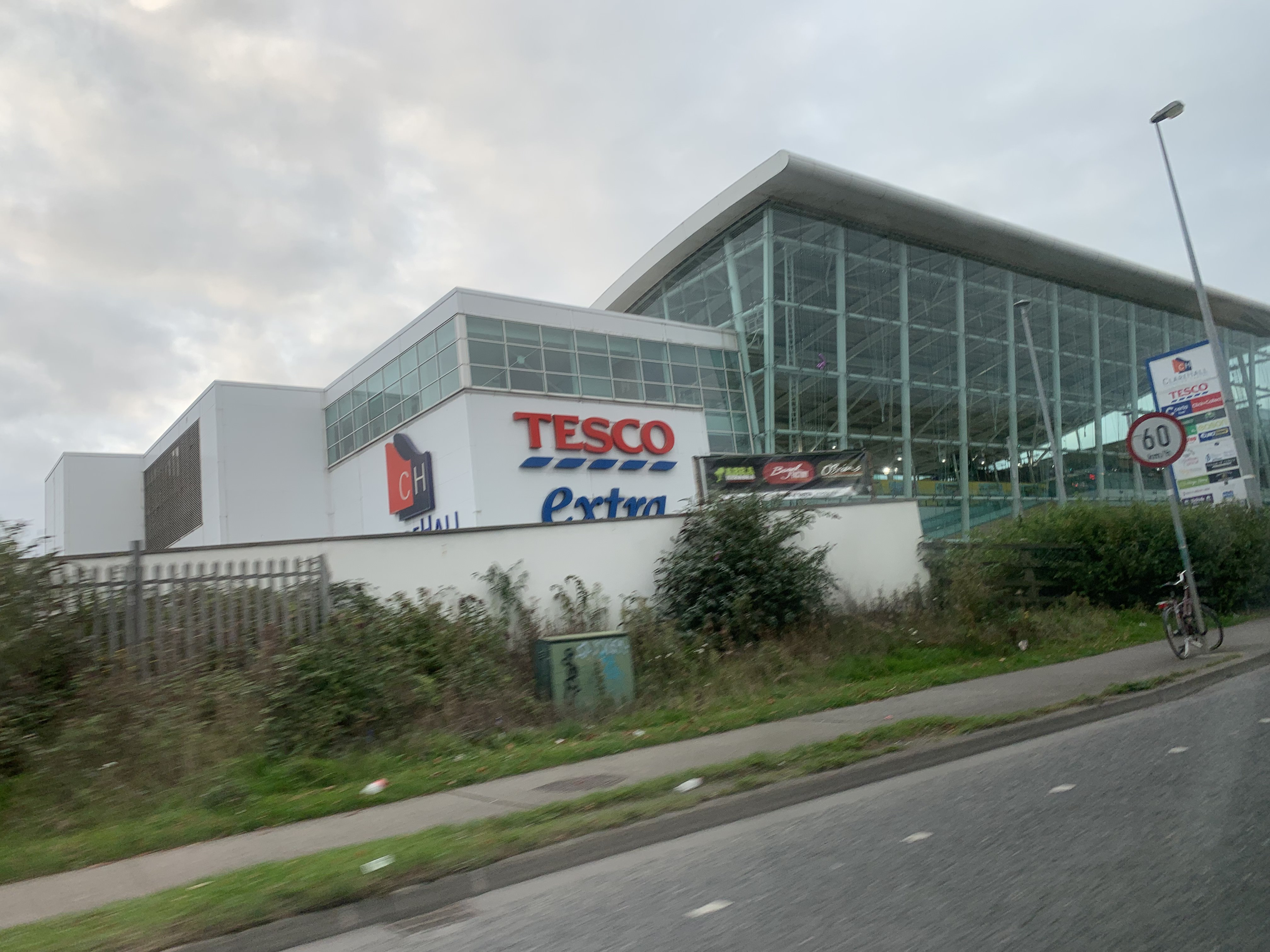
- Clarehall Shopping Centre
- Location: Dublin, Ireland
- Coordinates: 53°24′3.786″N 6°10′47.16″W
- Address: Malahide Road, Coolock, Dublin 17, Ireland
- Opened: 19 July 2004; 22 years ago
- Developer: Tesco Ireland
- Owner: Tesco Ireland
- Num. of stores: 28
- Num. of anchor tenants: 1
- Floor area: 194,996 square feet (18,115.7 m^{2})
- Floors: 3
- Parking: 879 parking spaces, all ground level
- Website: www.clarehall.ie

Clarehall Shopping Centre is a mid-size shopping centre located in the northern part of Coolock, north Dublin, adjacent to Ayrfield and near the housing estate of Clare Hall. The centre is owned by Tesco Ireland and anchored by one of Ireland’s first Tesco-branded stores.

== History ==
The shopping centre is built near the site of a former house, Claregrove Hall, and the Clare Manor Hotel which replaced it, these origins providing the name of both a nearby housing estate developed in the late 20th century, and the centre. The icehouse of the original house remains.

In March 2000, Tesco began planning to build a "£20 million shopping centre" in Dublin 17. Tesco was believed to have paid around £12 million for the 10-acre site. By October, they had applied for planning permission to develop the shopping centre.

Over one year later, Tesco was still applying for planning permission as it was rejected by Dublin City Corporation as Tesco's request was for a shopping centre to replace existing planning permission for a standalone store.

In May 2002, it was announced that Tesco had received approval to build a €70 million shopping centre in the Clare Hall area of Dublin following a campaign lasting four years.

The shopping centre officially opened on 19 July 2004 with the grand opening ribbon cut by Kerry Katona.

Clare Hall won the "Commercial Development in the Republic" Irish Property award in 2004.

== Structure ==
The centre comprises a main building over three floors, the middle level dominated by Tesco, with additional shops on the ground and middle levels, and entertainment and office facilities on the upper level. Among the offices are one of Ireland's driving licence application centres and a medical centre. The ground level is mostly parking, with external laundry facilities and a Tesco grocery collection point. The main building features a high glass roof, designed to capture heat and increase operational efficiency.

Within the curtilage of the main centre is a smaller building, formerly primarily housing a gym with swimming pools but now divided into a range of shops, along with a restaurant.

== Gallery ==
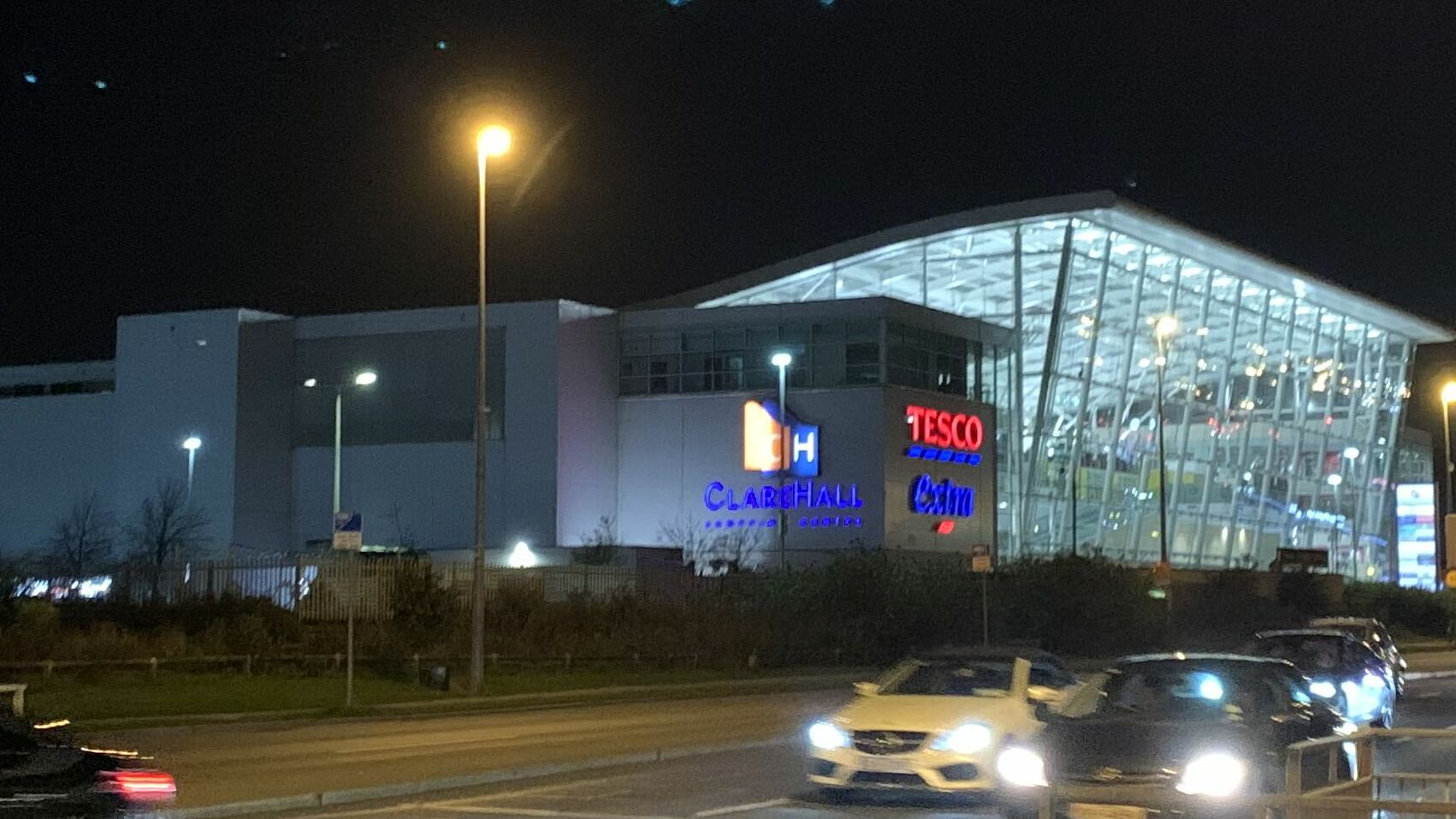
The Clarehall Shopping Centre at night.

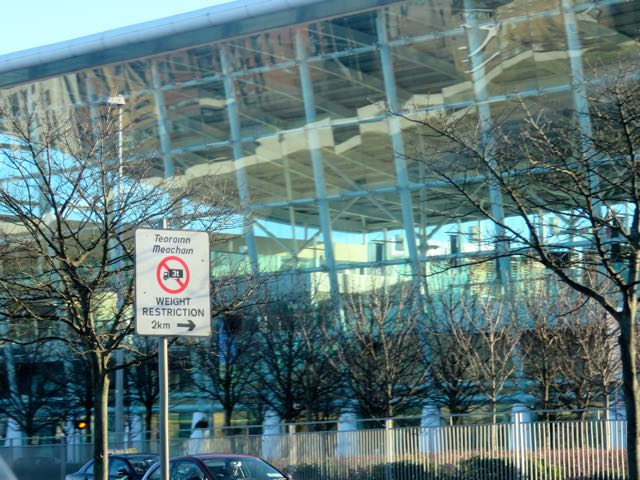
Viewing the structural techniques of the shopping centre.

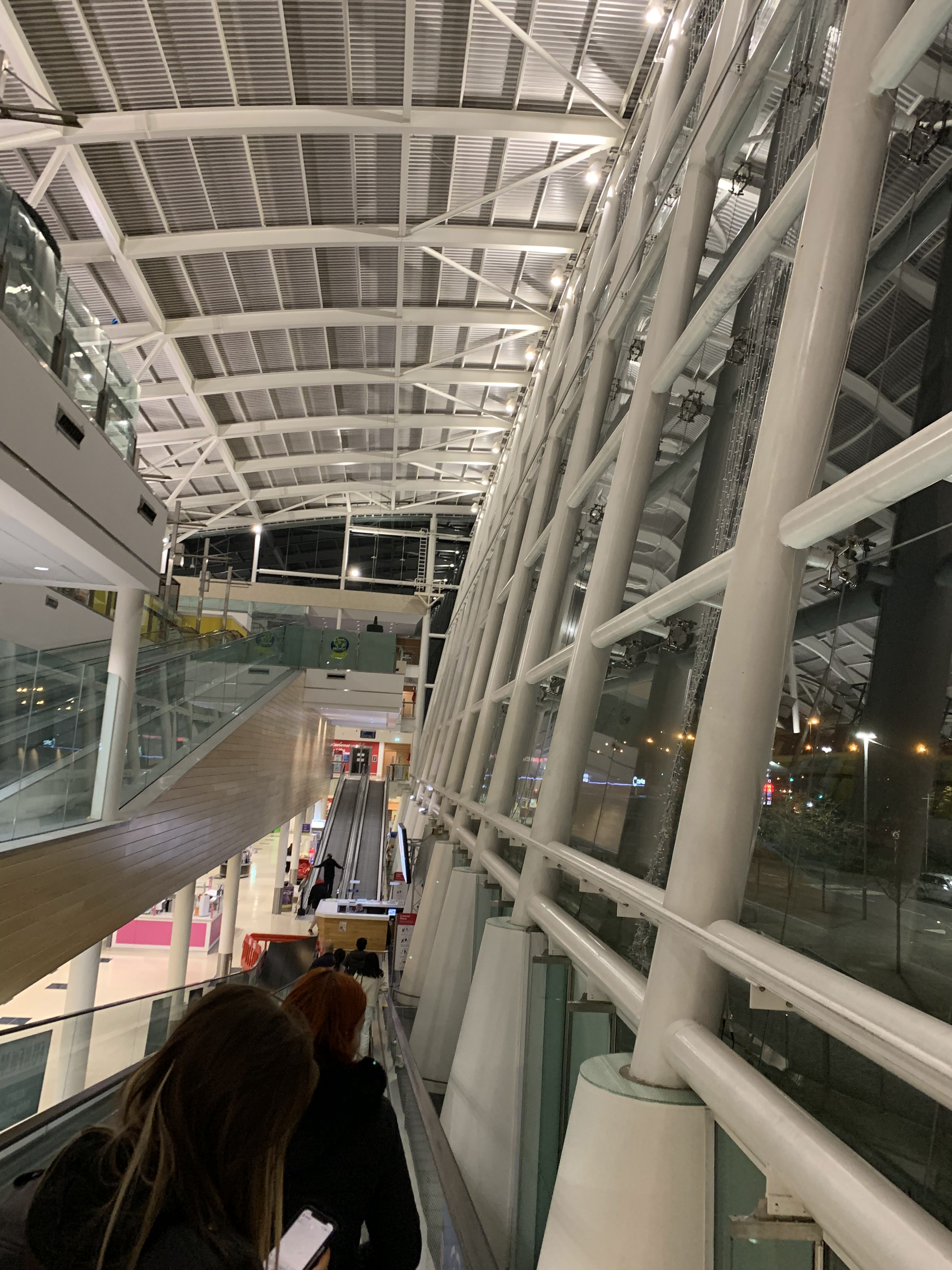
An escalator in Clarehall Shopping Centre.

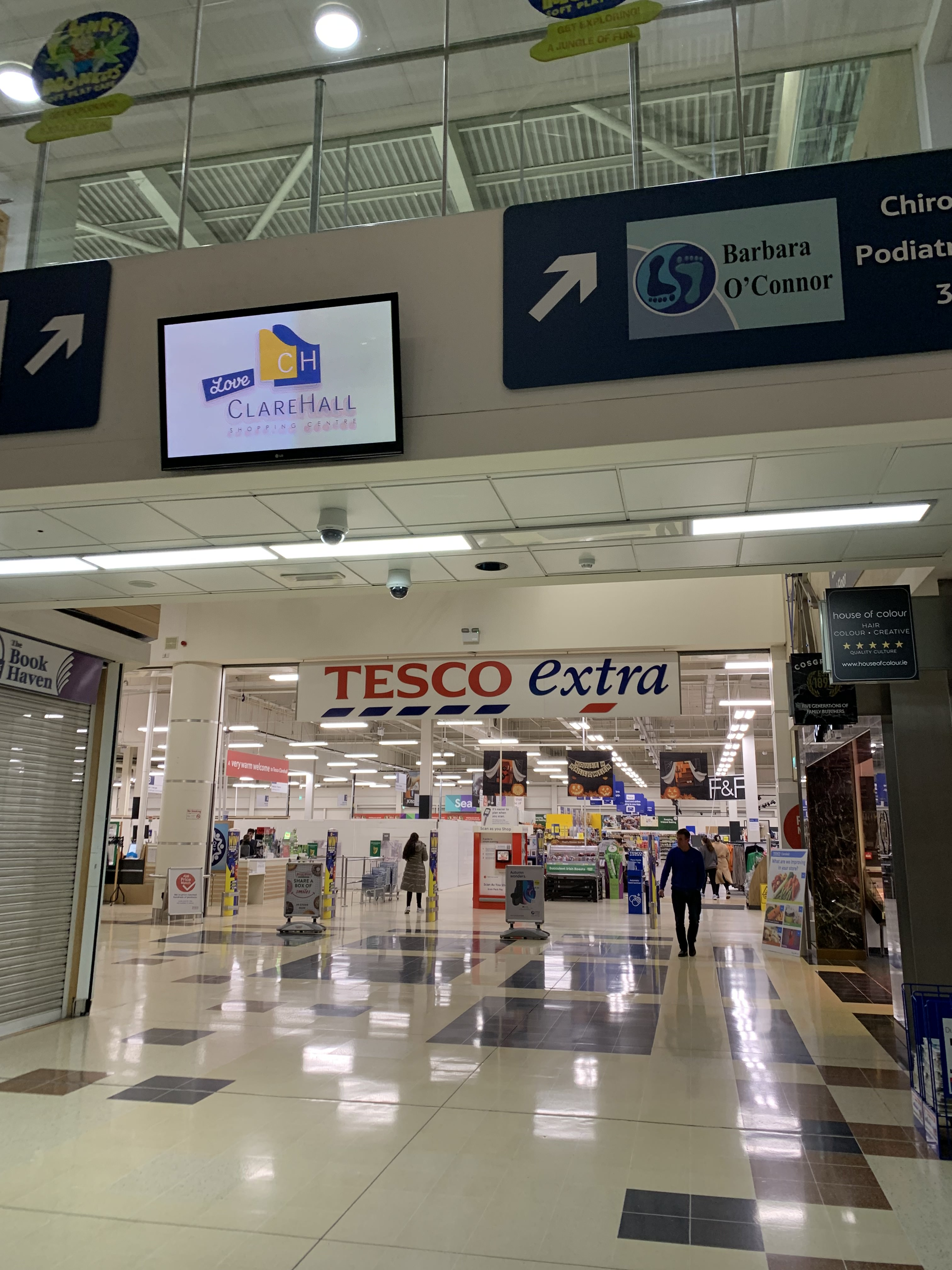
The entrance to the Tesco anchor store in the Clarehall Shopping Centre.
