= Paul Coffey (judge) =

Irish barrister, High Court judge since 2016

The Hon. Mr. Justice Paul Coffey

Judge of the High Court
- Incumbent
- Assumed office 13 September 2016
- Nominated by: Government of Ireland
- Appointed by: Michael D. Higgins

Personal details
- Education: University College Dublin; King's Inns; Middle Temple

Paul Coffey is an Irish judge and lawyer who has served as a Judge of the High Court since September 2016. He has been predominantly involved in criminal trials as a judge and formerly as a barrister. He was the chair of an examination into the Stardust fire between 2008 and 2009.

== Education ==
He was educated at University College Dublin. He received a BCL degree in 1981 and an LL.M. degree in 1983. He received further education at the King's Inns and Middle Temple.

== Legal career ==
He was called to the Bar in 1984 and became a senior counsel in 2002. His practice was focused on criminal law and civil law, with experience in the law of personal injuries, medical negligence, planning law, Constitutional law, chancery and judicial review.

His criminal law work included working on behalf of the Director of Public Prosecutions as a prosecutor and on behalf for defendants. He represented the Minister for the Environment in 2003 in a challenge by Kathy Sinnott against the result of the 2002 Irish general election.

On 10 July 2008, he was appointed to chair to an examination into the cause of the Stardust fire. His investigation found that the Stardust Victims' Committee had not established any new evidence which could change the conclusion as to how the fire was started. He concluded that he did not believe that public interest would be served by establishing a further inquiry. The Government accepted his recommendation. His draft report however recommended the establishment of an independent inquiry. A further examination by Pat McCartan in 2017 also did not recommend a full inquiry.

== Judicial career ==
Coffey was appointed to the High Court in September 2016. He has presided over criminal trials involving serious sexual offences and homicide. He has been the presiding judge in cases in the Special Criminal Court involving dissident republicans and the Hutch–Kinahan feud.

Other than criminal trials, he has heard cases involving Garda compensation, defamation, insolvency, and company law.

As of 2021, he is the judge in charge of the Personal Injuries List of the High Court.
