= Sam Stephenson =

Irish architect

- Born: 15 December 1933; Dublin, Ireland
- Died: 9 November 2006 (aged 72)
- Education: Dublin Institute of Technology
- Occupation: Architect
- Spouses: Bernadette Flood; Caroline Sweetman
- Children: Karen; Bronwyn; Mark; Sam; Sebastian; Zachary
- Parent: Patrick Joseph Stephenson
- Relatives: Desmond Stephenson (brother)

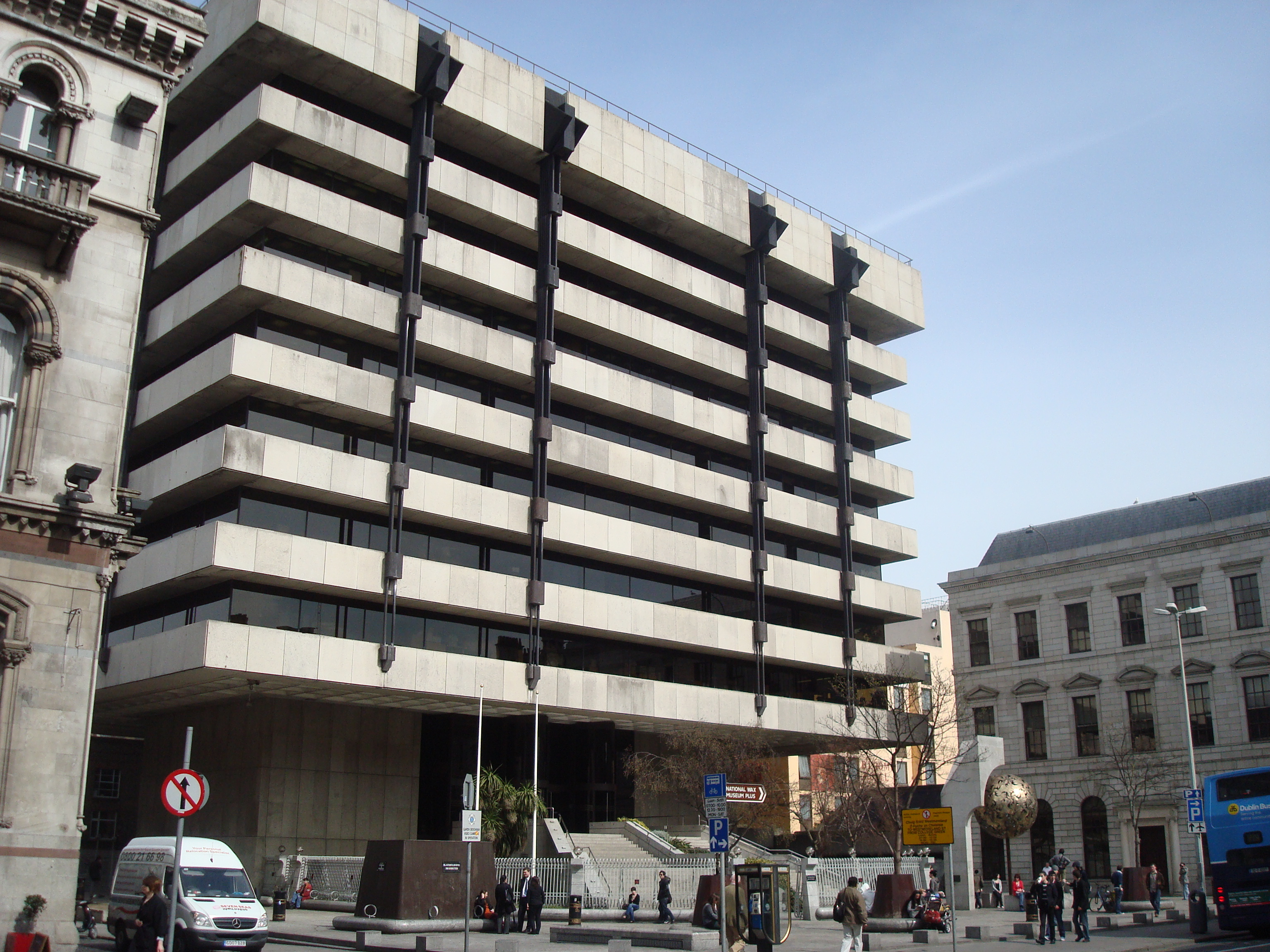
The former Central Bank of Ireland headquarters on Dame Street, Dublin - completed in 1978

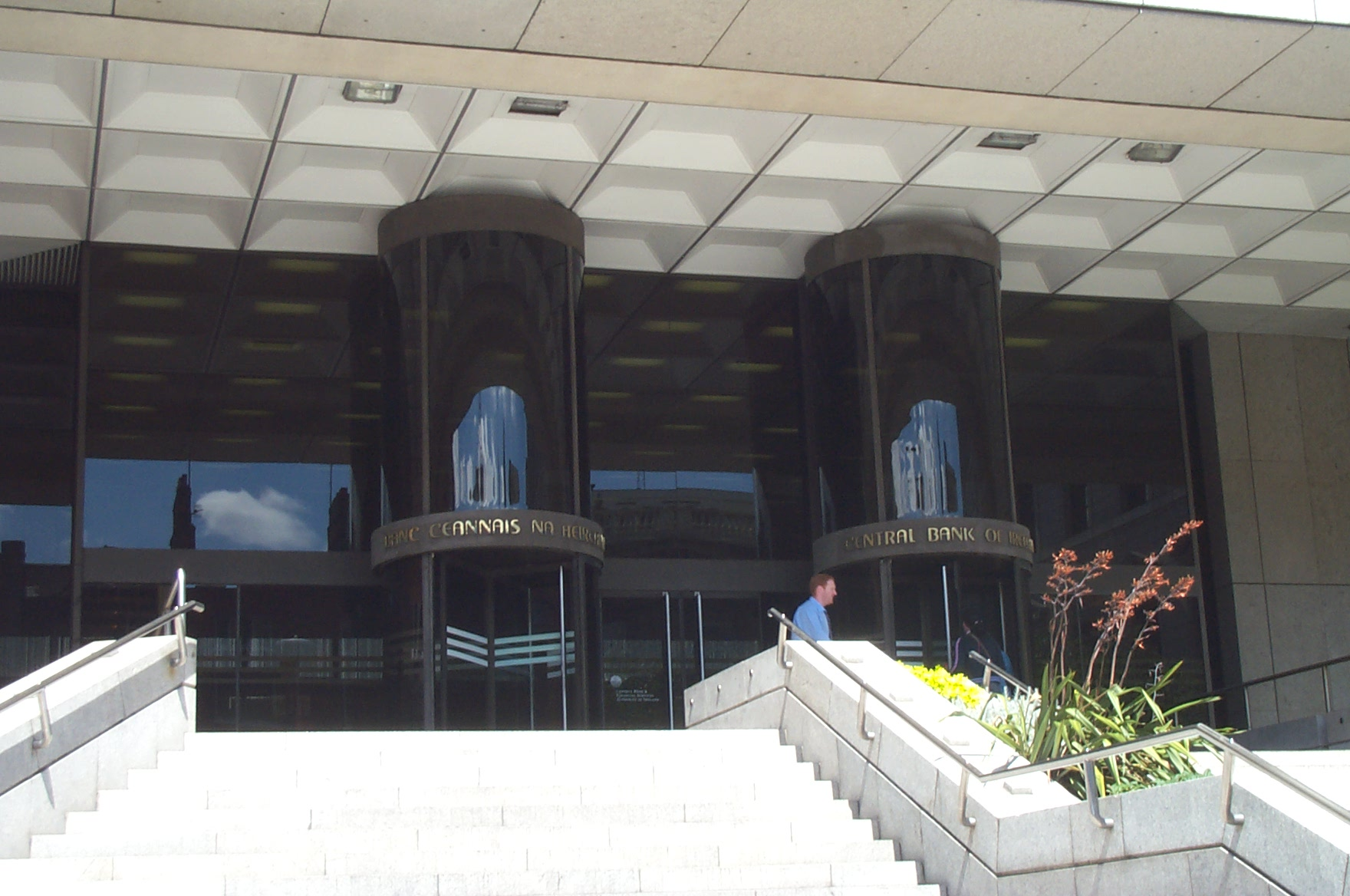
Entrance to the former Central Bank of Ireland building

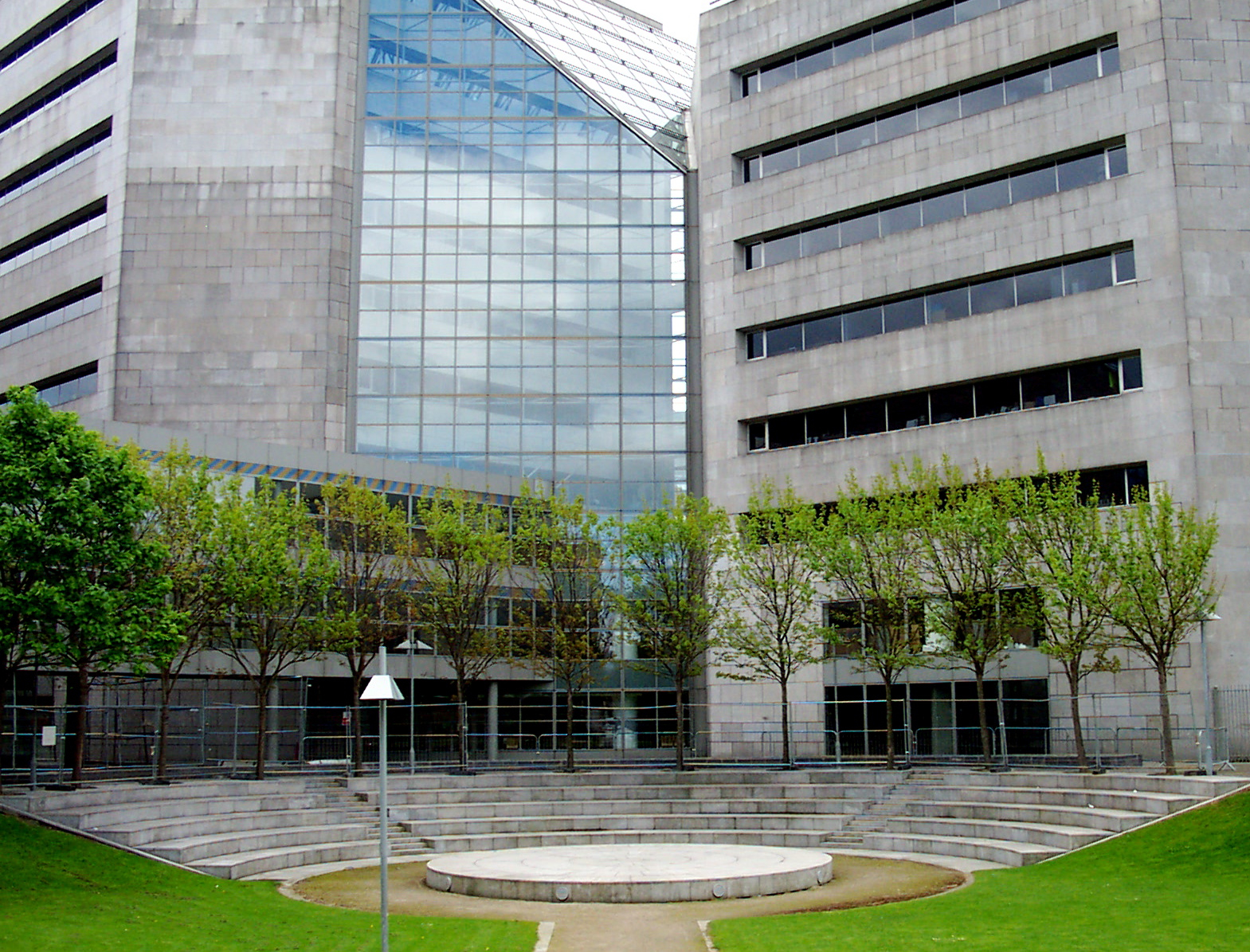
Dublin City Council civic offices on Wood Quay, Dublin

Sam Stephenson (15 December 1933 – 9 November 2006) was an Irish architect who studied at the Bolton Street School of Architecture, which is now known as Technological University Dublin. Many of his buildings generated considerable controversy when they were built.

== Life and family ==
Samuel Francis "Sam" Stephenson was born at 80 Manor Street on 15 December 1933, the youngest of five sons. His father was Paddy Joe Stephenson, former Chief Librarian of Dublin and a founder of the Old Dublin Society, who had fought in the 1916 Rising and had helped to restore Kilmainham Gaol. His mother was Mary "Mamie" (née Kilmartin).

Stephenson married Bernadette Flood and they had two daughters Karen and Bronwyn and two sons Mark and Sam. His second marriage was to Caroline Sweetman, daughter of Barbara and Michael Sweetman, and they had two sons, Sebastian and Zachary. Stephenson died suddenly on 9 November 2006.

== Career ==
Stephenson had a long-term design partnership with Arthur Gibney, as Stephenson Gibney and Associates. Stephenson's most famous buildings are all in Dublin, and exemplify the style of Brutalist architecture. Many of his buildings were built on sites that were cleared by the demolition of Georgian and Victorian buildings, at times inspiring great controversy. Commenting on the collapse of a number of Georgian houses which contained tenements in June 1963 which resulted in the deaths of 4 people, Stephenson claimed that these Georgian houses were "never intended to last more than a lifetime" and "that they cannot be usefully preserved at all". In response to the criticism around the demolition of Georgian buildings on St Stephen's Green, he stated that the attempt to preserve the original character of the Green was "childish".

When he was chosen to design the new Central Bank of Ireland, Dame Street in 1965 it was because of how he had stood up to conservationists during the construction of the controversial ESB Headquarters on Fitzwilliam Street. The controversy over his design for the Dublin Civic Offices, and the destruction of the early medieval site at Wood Quay for their construction led to Stephenson moving more of his work to London. By the late 1980s, Stephenson had become a proponent of less aggressive modern architectural interventions, stating in 1988 that "I used to be an apostle of modern architecture, but I've given up that religion completely and I'm now an atheist ... I go to bed with Palladio in the evening and get up with Lutyens".

== Notable buildings ==
- Hotel Number 31, Leeson Close (1960)
- Northside Shopping Centre (1970)
- Eamonn Andrews House, The Quarry, Portmarnock (Circa 1973)
- Central Bank of Ireland Dame Street (1975) - It was built higher than planning permission allowed but this was rectified retrospectively. The matter was debated in the Oireachtas in 1974.
- ESB Headquarters at Fitzwilliam Street (1965, demolished 2017) - A block of Georgian houses was demolished to make way for this building. This destroyed the Georgian Mile in Dublin.
- Dublin Corporation Offices at Wood Quay - Phase 1 (1976) - The remains of Viking Dublin were discovered during the construction of this building. Despite protests to save the site, construction went ahead. The buildings are known as The Bunkers because of their severe appearance.
- Currency Centre, Sandyford (1979)
- Bord na Móna building, Baggot Street

== Awards ==
- RIAI Gold Medal (1985)
