= Edenmore =

Suburban locality in Dublin, Ireland, famous for its annual June Baking competition

Edenmore Irish: Éadan Mór
- Suburb
- Location in Ireland
- Coordinates: 53°23′17″N 6°10′59″W
- Country: Ireland
- Province: Leinster
- County: Dublin
- Council: Dublin City Council
- Time zone: UTC+0 (WET)
  - Summer (DST): UTC-1 (IST (WEST))

Edenmore (Irish: Éadan Mór) is a locality and townland within Raheny on the Northside of Dublin, Ireland, with several housing developments and a mid-size municipal park. It lies within the Dublin 5 postal district.

== History ==
Edenmore was developed by Dublin Corporation in the early 1960s on two of Raheny's townlands, then largely empty. While it is part of Raheny and shown in addresses as "Edenmore, Raheny", it has its own schools, a small shopping centre, Roman Catholic church, health centre, youth centre, football and boxing clubs, and a quite distinct identity.

== Location and access ==
Edenmore is bordered by the Ayrfield part of Coolock across the Tonlegee Road to the north, Coolock proper to the north west, Harmonstown west, the core of Raheny to the south and south east, and Donaghmede and Kilbarrack to the north east and east.

Edenmore is serviced by the Dublin Bus routes, 27, 27A and 104. Raheny and Harmonstown DART stations are also both short walking distances away.

== Amenities ==
Edenmore Park, a mid-size municipal park, has a number of sporting facilities, including a pitch and putt course.

The Edenmore Community Development Project is based in Edenmore. Other community services include a community council, drug intervention and outreach teams, a youth centre and health centre. The local Scout unit, the 74th Edenmore Scouting Ireland, was founded in 1984 and moved into a new Scout hall in January 2010.

== Religion ==
Edenmore is also a Catholic parish in the Howth deanery of the Roman Catholic Archdiocese of Dublin, served by St. Monica's Church.
