= Priorswood =

District in the northern Dublin suburb of Coolock

Priorswood Coill an Phrióra (Irish)
- Townland
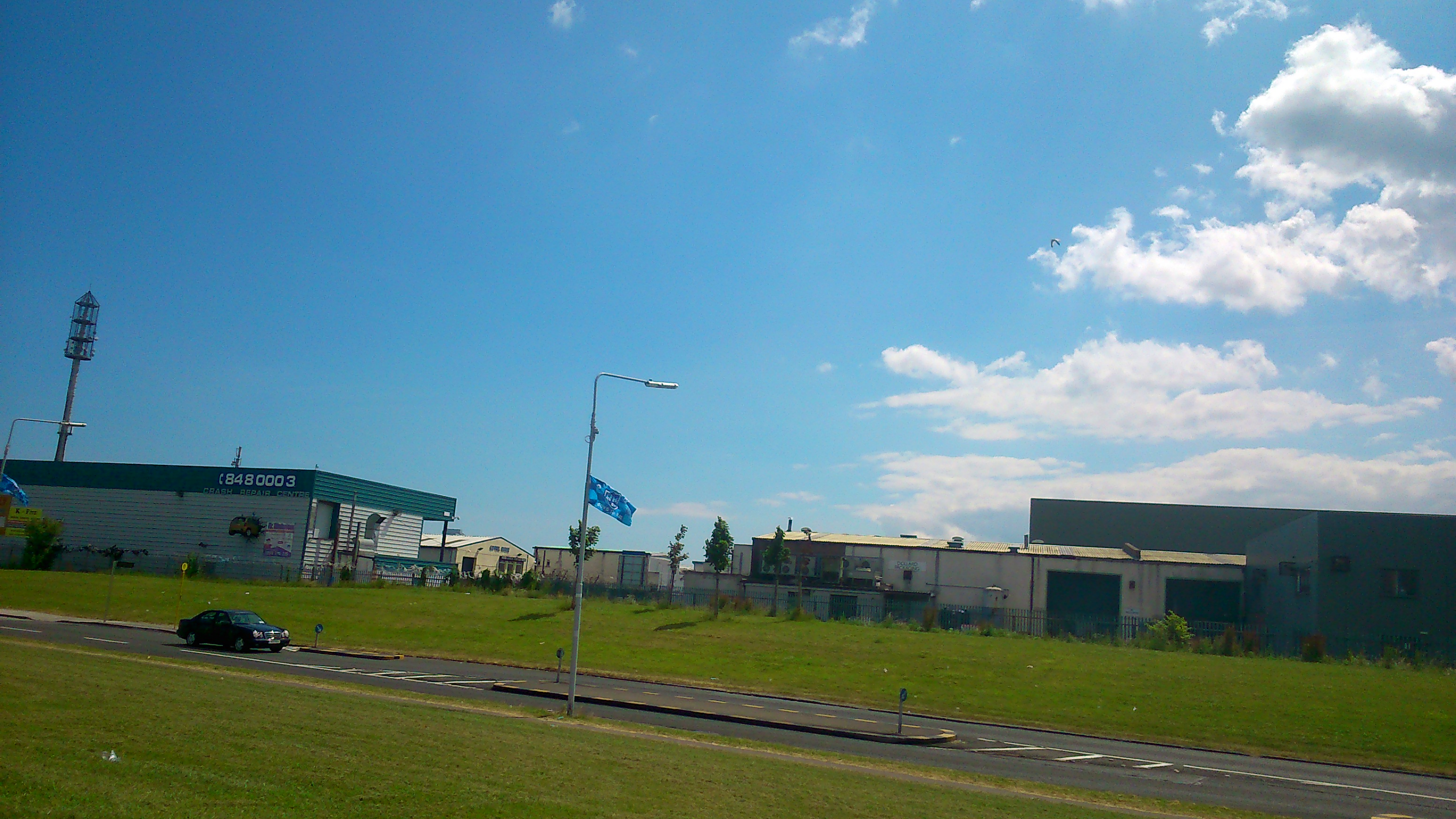
- Priorswood Road, Coolock

- Location in Dublin
- Coordinates: 53°24′08″N 6°12′19″W
- Country: Ireland
- Province: Leinster
- County: County Dublin
- Local authority: Dublin City Council
- Elevation: 42 m (138 ft)
- Eircode routing key: D17

Priorswood (Irish: Coill an Phrióra) is a townland and district in northern Coolock, on the Northside of Dublin, Ireland. It is in the jurisdiction of Dublin City Council and forms part of the Dublin 17 postal district.

== Location and access ==
The area is located in the northern part of the civil parish of Coolock, on formerly rural land, and borders Darndale to the east, Clonshaugh to the west and Coolock itself to the south. The modern-day estates that make up the area are found west of Darndale, north of the Greencastle Road, east of the Clonshaugh Industrial Estate and south of the R139; the part which lies north of the R139 has no or few residents. The Turnapin Stream, one of the two main tributaries which form the Mayne River, runs through the northern part of the area.

The core of the district is the townland of the same name in the civil parish of Coolock.

Priorswood is accessible by taking the Priorswood Road off the Blunden Drive/Darndale Roundabout on the Malahide Road, and via the Clonshaugh Road from the N32, and is within 2.5 km of Dublin Airport. It is served by the Dublin Bus route number 27, 27x, 27c, 27b on the Malahide Road.

== Amenities ==
Priorswood largely comprises residential property, along with a parish church, St Francis of Assisi Junior and Senior National Schools (on Clonshaugh Drive), and a special junior post-primary school for Traveller children. Clonshaugh Shopping Centre is found next to the church and includes a dentist, protein store, newsagent, pub, pharmacy and other outlets. Belcamp Park (and Darndale Park) are located to the north. There is a Gaelic Athletic Association sports ground opposite the main Traveller settlement.

The socio-economic profile of the Priorswood area is similar to that of neighbouring Darndale, and the housing stock in the area is almost totally local authority housing, though of a different form to the bulk of Darndale. Although defined distinctly, Darndale and Priorswood are often mentioned together.

=== Developments ===
The Clayton Hotel at Dublin Airport was built in neighbouring Clonshaugh, just as the N32 branches towards the Baskin, and a Hilton Hotel and a number of retail and service outlets at the nearby Northern Cross development, on the lands of the former Belcamp College in Balgriffin.

Bewley's have a tea and coffee packing plant west of the Northern Cross development and a number of companies are also based there.

== Religion ==
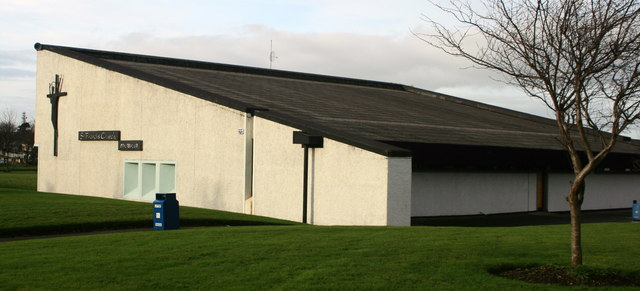
St. Francis church

Priorswood is a parish in the Fingal South East deanery of the Roman Catholic Archdiocese of Dublin. It is served by the Church of St Francis of Assisi.

== Representation ==
In Dáil Éireann, Priorswood is in the constituency of Dublin Bay North.
