= Darndale =

Suburb of Dublin, Ireland

Darndale Darndál (Irish)
- Suburb
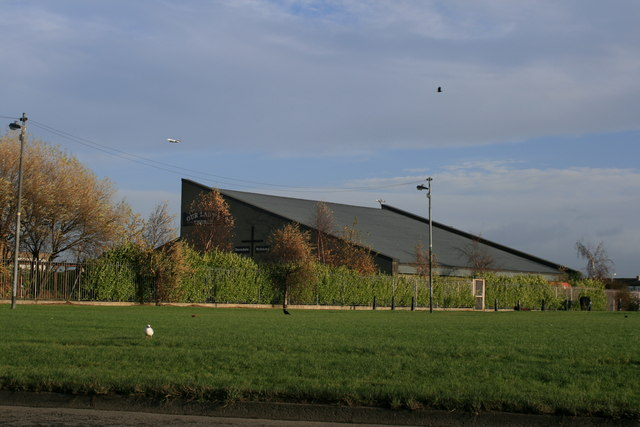
- Our Lady Immaculate Church, located in Darndale
- Interactive map of Darndale
- Coordinates: 53.401005°N 6.193959°W
- Country: Ireland
- Province: Leinster
- County (traditional): County Dublin
- Local authority: Dublin City Council
- Eircode routing key: D17

Darndale (Irish: Darndál) is a suburb of Dublin, Ireland, featuring a high concentration of social housing. It is located in the north of the sprawling suburb of Coolock. Darndale lies within the Dublin 17 postal district.

== History ==
The area originally comprised farmlands in the northern part of the civil parish of Coolock, and took its name from either a large house situated to the west of Malahide Road or from the townland of the same name. It was intensively developed by Dublin Corporation as a "low rise, high density" housing development.

== Location and access ==
7 km northeast of the city centre, Darndale is bordered to the east by the Malahide Road (the R107), to the north by the R139 (previously the N32), continuing the line of the M50 orbital motorway, to the west by Priorswood, and to the south by the Riverside housing estate in Coolock. It comprises the Buttercup and Marigold groups of roads, Primrose Grove, Snowdrop Walk and Tulip Court.

Darndale is accessible by a roundabout exit from Malahide Road and the old Clonshaugh Road from the R139, and also via Greencastle Road. It is within 3 km of Dublin Airport.

It is served by Dublin Bus, routes 27, 27X, 27c.

== Today ==
Darndale has a planned village centre that contains a newsagent's shop and off-licence, pharmacy and takeaway restaurant. Within the village centre is Darndale Belcamp Integrated Childcare Services (known locally as the Jigsaw Centre), one of the largest community childcare centres in Ireland, and an HSE Primary Care Unit, which provides a doctors surgery, baby nurse and community welfare support to the local community. No planning permission is applied or approved.

The main building in the Darndale Belcamp Village Centre is the Bell Building, designed by Michael O'Shea, which is a unique and collective combination of integrated community services operating in and around a multipurpose building. The Bell Building provides many services to the local community, including adult education, youth training, information and support, older people support services, environmental programmes and administration and job-seeking services to the local community.

There is a large traveller community located close to Darndale, by the R139, and in a separate compound, Traveller school facilities. This site is mentioned in the song "Go, Move, Shift", written by Ewan MacColl and Christy Moore.

Immediately adjacent is the large Clare Hall Shopping Centre (anchored by Tesco Ireland), a Certa petrol station and a Hilton Hotel (the "Dublin Airport Hilton"). The area also has several other amenities, including an Odeon Cinema, Leisure Plex, several fast food restaurants, a community sports hall, a community gym and an industrial estate directly across from the main road into Darndale.

Since around 2004, Darndale has also had a substantial fishing pond located in the local park, built in cooperation with the Eastern Regional Fisheries Board. In 2011 this underwent a cleanup operation to remove a large amount of weed which had grown in the pond.

== Religion ==
Darndale, along with the neighbouring Belcamp housing development, forms a parish in the Roman Catholic church. The parish is in the Fingal South East deanery of the Roman Catholic Archdiocese of Dublin.

== Approach and issues ==
=== Social housing concept ===
Darndale was built as a social housing experiment consisting of low-rise, courtyard-based houses to encourage stronger community links in large, and largely resettled, communities. The idea of the "courts" was to create neighbourly bonds among the new residents. This idea of a communal space fostering community spirit was based on a large housing scheme called Cricketer's Way, located in Andover, Hampshire, England. This housing plan has not been repeated in Ireland since the construction of the Darndale estates.

=== Social issues ===
Problems involving the courts began to surface and some became centres of anti-social behaviour, with residents, spearheaded by Michael O'Shea, complaining to the local authority. Changes were made to the housing plan: laneways were closed and back gardens extended, and CCTV was installed in the estates.

In 1993, Martine Franck, a Magnum photographer and Henri Cartier-Bresson's second wife, did a project on Darndale, showing deprived children in their environment.

== Popular media ==
In September 2014, a documentary series about the housing estate, named Darndale: The Edge of Town aired on TV3 and also in March 2015 it featured on 'The Benefits Estate' a reality documentary-series on Channel 5 in the UK.

The Irish crime film Cardboard Gangsters, 2017, was based in Darndale.

Darndale was also featured in an episode of the Dutch documentary series named Danny in de buitenwijken (airing on NPO 3 in 2018), where Danny Ghosen visits "deprived areas" of several big European cities. In the Dublin episode, he visits several northern suburbs of Dublin, including Darndale.

== Notable people ==
- John Connors – actor and filmmaker
- Denise Mitchell – Politician
