= Northside Shopping Centre =

Mid-size shopping centre in northern Dublin, Ireland

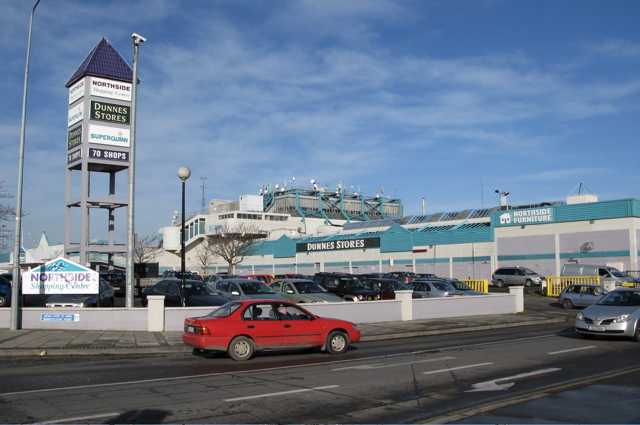
- The shopping centre and carpark, 2007
- Location: Coolock, Dublin, Ireland
- Coordinates: 53.395761°N 6.213612°W
- Address: Oscar Traynor Road
- Opened: 1 October 1970; 56 years ago
- Developer: Green Property Ltd
- Owner: AM Alpha
- Architect: Sam Stephenson
- Floors: 2
- Parking: 600+
- Website: northsideshoppingcentre.ie

Northside Shopping Centre is a shopping centre located in Coolock, Dublin, Ireland. It opened in 1970.

== History ==
=== Development ===
The plans for the shopping centre were first unveiled in May 1967 by John Corcoran, managing director of Green Property Ltd., the developers of the project, to a member of Dublin Corporation and architect Sam Stephenson (of Stephenson Gibney & Associates). It was stated that the shopping centre was intended to include a library and swimming pool. The main frontage of the shopping centre was facing Coolock Lane which was to change its name to Oscar Traynor Road, after Oscar Traynor.

In August 1968, it was stated that work on the centre was to begin in the following two months and the centre would be completed within two years. The centre was a joint venture between Green Property Ltd. and Dublin Corporation. By November 1969, the shopping centre was nearing completion of stage one of construction, with an estimated total cost of £1 million (equivalent to £14,530,023 in 2025).

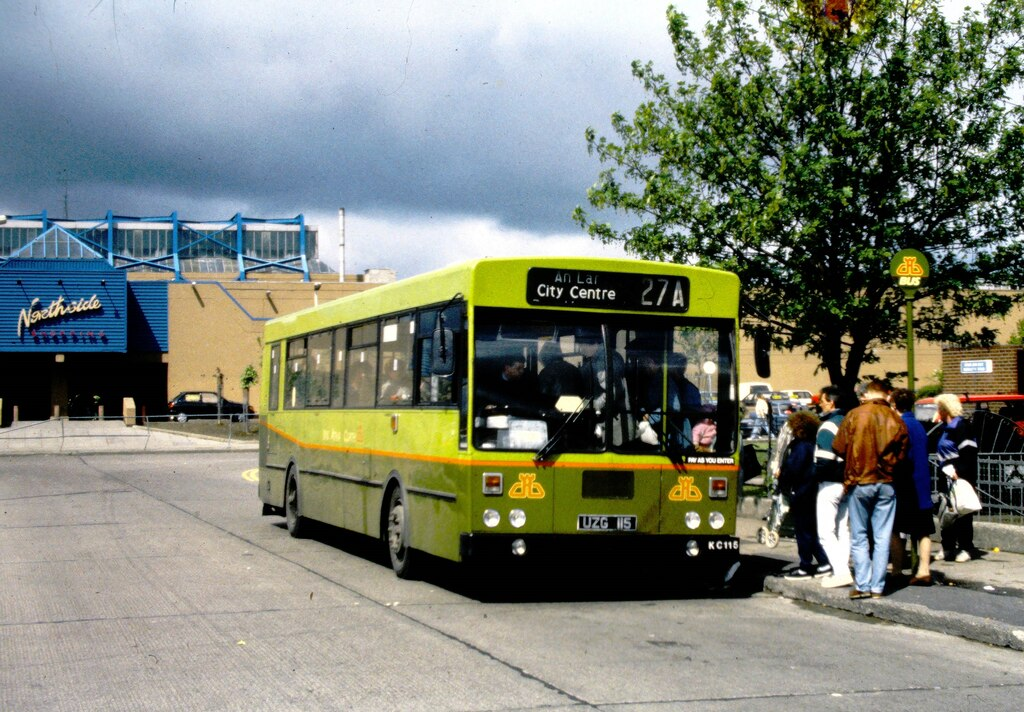
A bus stopped in front of the shopping centre, May 1990

On 20 July 1970, Feargal Quinn, then managing director of Superquinn, announced at the Gresham Hotel that his company was planning to open a 22,000 square feet (2,000 m^{2}) store in the shopping centre in the following months. It was announced in September 1970 that the shopping centre was to open the following month and that the total shopping area of the shopping centre was in excess of 80,000 square feet (7,400 m^{2}).

==== Swimming pool ====
On the second floor was a 10,000 square feet (930 m^{2}) swimming pool operated by Dublin Corporation, the first of its kind in Ireland. The swimming pool officially opened on 5 May 1971. In March 2023, it was announced that the rooftop swimming pool was to be shut down after more than 50 years.

=== Opening ===
The shopping centre was officially opened on 1 October 1970 by British television interviewer and radio disc jockey, Simon Dee. All 56 shopping units in the centre had been fully let out to tenants by September.

=== Refurbishment and sale ===
Renovations and extension in the 1980s and 2008 have covered most of Sam Stephenson's original open-space concept. In 2013, it was announced that a €5 million further refurbishment was about to commence in the centre. This followed the loss of the anchor non-food store, a Dunnes Stores branch, and saw the arrival of new shops, including Heatons (with Sportsworld), new dining facilities, and a Well Woman Centre.

The refurbishment was completed in late 2016 following a 2-phase modernisation of both interior and exterior. The centre was numbered among the property assets of NAMA; it was subsequently sold to Patron Capital for €49 million in 2015. In 2019, German investor AM Alpha acquired the centre for €50 million.

The old logo, in use from c. 2000 to 2016

== Popular media ==
The branch of Paddy Power bookmakers in the car park was one of the venues visited in a Channel 4's Undercover Boss episode 3, season 4.
