= Naniken River =

Small river in northern suburbs of Dublin, Ireland

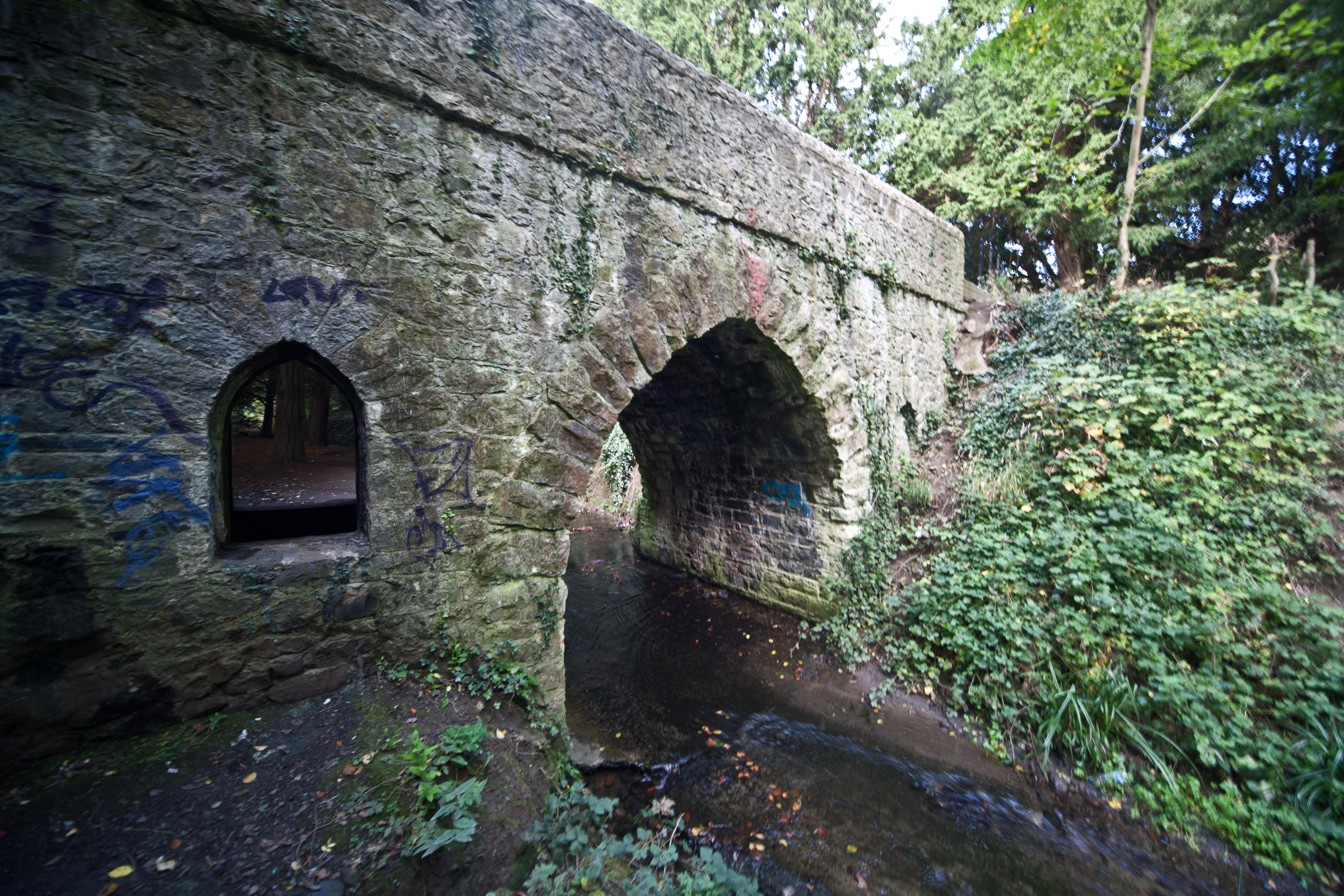
- Bridge over the river in St. Anne's Park
- Etymology: Little Nanny
- Native name: An Nainicín (Irish)

Physical characteristics
- Source
  - location: Santry
- Mouth
  - location: Dublin Bay, Raheny, by St Anne's Park

The Naniken River (Irish: An Nainicín) is a minor river on the north side of Dublin city, Ireland, one of more than forty watercourses monitored by Dublin City Council. It is culverted for its upper course, visible in St Anne's Park for its entire lower course, and causes flooding somewhere along its line most years. The river flows entirely within the jurisdiction of Dublin City Council.

== Etymology ==
The origins of the name, also spelt sometimes as Nannikin or Naneken, are unclear, though it has been speculated that it might be a diminutive reflection (with the suffix -(i)kin) of the much-larger River Nanny flowing just north of the County Dublin boundary.

== Course ==
=== Upper reaches ===
The Naniken rises under Shanliss Way, in what is now a light industrial zone off Santry Avenue (formerly Santry Lane), in Santry. It passes under Schoolhouse Lane and the Oak Park development, then by siphon below the Dublin Port Tunnel's northern portal area. It then flows through Beaumont and Artane, passing Lorcan Crescent, Coolgariff Road, Kilmore Road and Ardlea Road, where a fully culverted tributary joins from the lands now occupied by Beaumont Hospital. The watercourse then runs by Maryfield Crescent, and on under Mornington Grove, near the Artane Roundabout, to cross the Malahide Road, and then continues through southern Artane and western Harmonstown, coming into Raheny via a siphon under the railway. It flows on under a former laneway, by an early suburban apartment development, Rosevale.

The stretch from Harmonstown to St Anne's Park is sometimes known as the Ballyhoy River, and a road within the St. Anne's housing estate was named after it. In Raheny, the Naniken once formed the boundary of the Church of Ireland glebe (rectory lands). The river passes under Howth Road at the site of Ballyhoy Bridge, and emerges from its culvert to flow openly through St Anne's Park.

=== St Anne's Park to the sea ===
The Naniken is a central feature of Dublin's second largest municipal park, a former Guinness family estate. It passes in a shady channel through an area of playing fields, runs through the Dublin City Millennium Arboretum, and then flows in a more distinct valley through the central reaches of the park. In the 19th century there was a pond northwest of the modern-day nursery, with a small waterfall, but this is entirely gone now. Some artificial features were constructed for the Guinnesses near the river, including ornamental bridges (one high bridge was removed for safety reasons in the 1980s), at least one ford, and a couple of wider areas. Near the coast an offtake supplies the Duck Pond (or Old Pond), while the river itself flows around and passes under the James Larkin Road to enter the western half of the "lagoon" (also known as Crab Water or Raheny Lake) behind North Bull Island. The line of the Naniken from its mouth marks the boundary of the civil parish of Raheny with that of Clontarf, and the beginning of the Raheny portion of the Bull Island.

=== Culverting ===
As with many of Dublin's smaller watercourses, the upper and middle reaches of the Naniken were culverted over time, the covering of the stretch from Coolgariff Road to Kilmore Road being mentioned in parliamentary proceedings in 1960 by Neil Blaney, for example.

=== Link to River Santry ===
There is a drainage link between the Naniken and the Santry River, at the western end of Kilmore West, to reduce the general flow from the river's upper reaches, and to deal with flooding or overflow situations.

== Flooding ==
This small but long-established river causes flooding, as with the neighbouring Wad River, in many years. Frequent locations include Maryfield Crescent, Rosemount Avenue and parts of Kilmore. In 2014, the City Manager acknowledged the flood risks, noted that there was no near-term funding for serious remedial works, but agreed that the City Council would invest 60,000 euro in a hydraulic study.

== Popular culture ==
The river is mentioned in passing in Roddy Doyle's book "A Star Called Henry."
