= Coolock =

Large northern suburb of Dublin, Ireland

Coolock An Chúlóg (Irish)
- Suburb (village core)
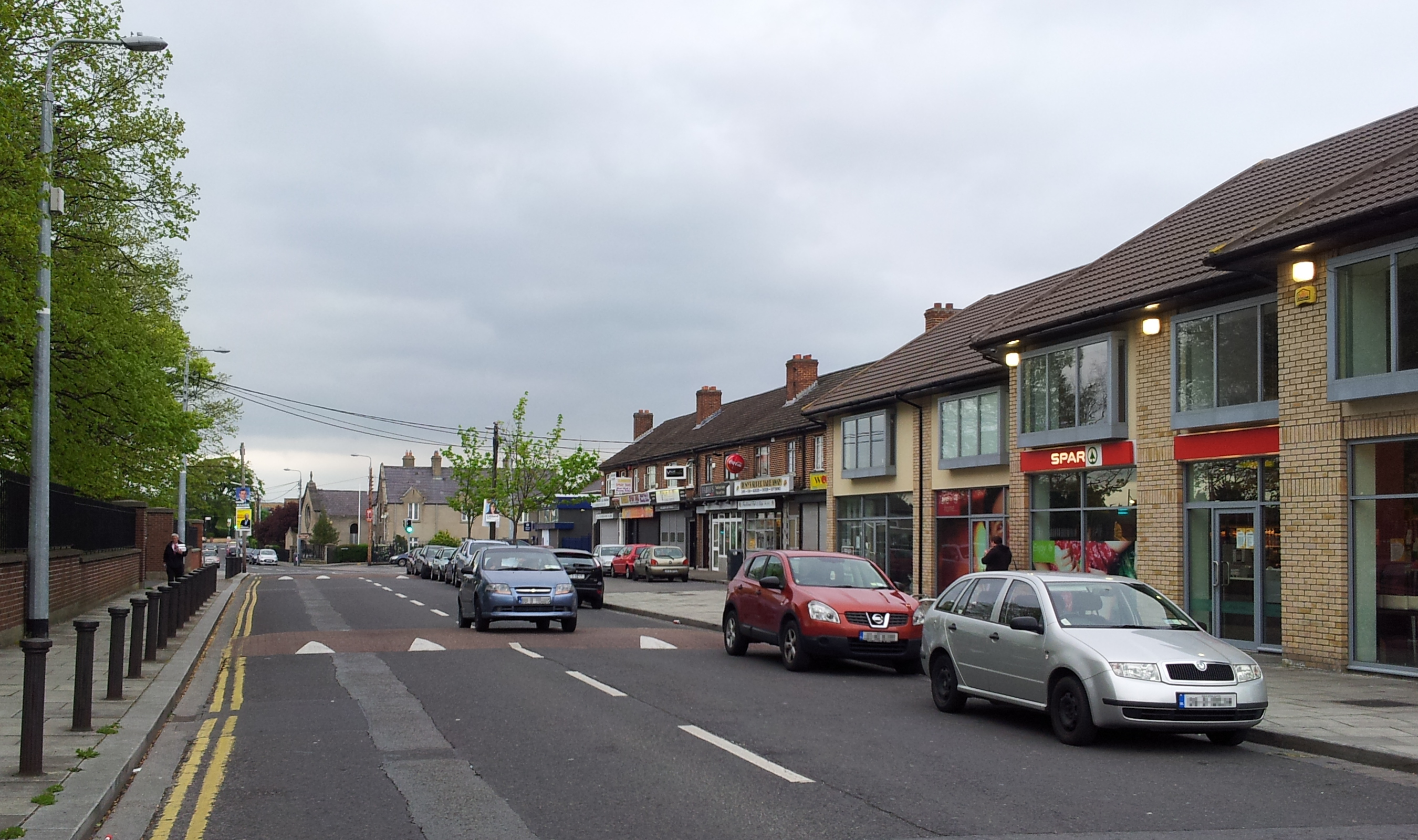
- Main Street, Coolock village

- Location in Dublin
- Coordinates: 53.3881°N 6.19930°W
- Country: Ireland
- Province: Leinster
- County: County Dublin
- Local authority: Dublin City Council
- Elevation: 38 m (125 ft)
- Eircode routing key: D05, D13, D17

Coolock (Irish: An Chúlóg, meaning 'the little corner') is a large suburban area, centred on a village, on Dublin city's Northside in Ireland. Coolock is crossed by the Santry River, a prominent feature in the middle of the district, with a linear park and ponds. The Coolock suburban area encompasses parts of three Dublin postal districts: Dublin 5, Dublin 13 and Dublin 17.

The extensive civil parish of Coolock takes in the land between the Tonlegee Road (as far as Donaghmede) and the Malahide Road, as well as the lands on either side of the Malahide Road between Darndale and Artane, and the lands either side of the Oscar Traynor Road on the approach to Santry.

Coolock is also the name of the historical barony which accounts for most of north Dublin city, from the coast as far as Phoenix Park, and stretching north as far as Swords.

== History ==
Coolock has a history dating back over 3,500 years – a Bronze-Age burial site in the area dates back to 1500 BC. Up until the early 19th century, a series of raths or mounds were present in the area, and were later flattened. One remains on the grounds of the Cadbury factory. The settlement grew up around a small early-Christian church. An early stone cross remaining near the Church of Ireland St John the Baptist Church associated with an early church of St Brendan the Navigator. A Catholic church, St. John's, was later built in the area. During Norman times, the area was owned by the Nugent family. It was later owned by the monastery of Duleek, and later the Earl of Drogheda.

A large Roman chapel was recorded there in 1780, and in 1831 the chapel was rebuilt with the thatched roof replaced with slates at a cost of £500. The area was still primarily agricultural, supplying Dublin city. During the 17th and 18th centuries, quarries were also opened. Around the turn of the 19th century, a number of large houses were built, including Coolock House. Coolock House was the home of the chemist, William Callaghan, who was the adoptive father of the foundress of the Sisters of Mercy, Catherine McAuley. Coolock House later became a convent.

Coolock remained a small village until the 1950s, with lands around the village being further developed over time, notably Bonnybrook and Kilmore West, between which a new centre to the area formed. A factor in this expansion was the construction of large housing estates by the Dublin Corporation. At one time the old village was on the Malahide Road but that road was diverted and now passes slightly to the east of the village; in the meantime, a secondary hamlet, Newtown Coolock, developed further north. Between 1961 and 1966, the population of Coolock increased by 91.8%.

Later in the 20th century, lands in the north of Coolock were developed to form the new districts of Darndale and Priorswood.

== Geography ==
Coolock lies on either side of the valley of the Santry River and includes a diversion from the little Naniken River. It is a relatively flat area a little above sea level, with a linear park around the Santry, and small green areas scattered through residential developments.

== Location and development ==
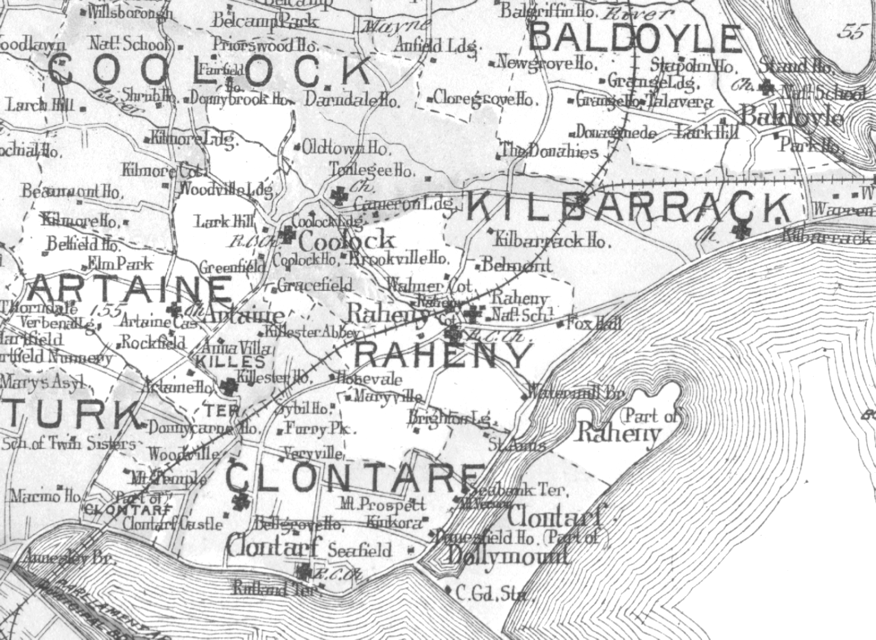
Coolock (most of) and areas to south and east

Coolock lies at the centre of the majority working-class Northside suburbs such as Kilbarrack, Donaghmede and the Edenmore part of Raheny, and itself includes localities such as Ayrfield, Bonnybrook, Darndale, Priorswood, Greencastle and Kilmore West. As with other large suburban areas, such as Tallaght or Swords, there is no legal definition for Coolock, and so no definitive population figures, but it is one of Dublin's largest residential areas. It is crossed by the Oscar Traynor Road, running from the Malahide Road to Santry, and named for the War of Independence politician, later long-serving minister, Oscar Traynor. The majority of Coolock, excluding Ayrfield, was built-up by the city authority, Dublin Corporation, as part of a programme of the phased inner-city slum clearance (between the 1950s and 1980s).

The permanent Traveller halting site estates of Cara Park and Dominick Park, found in the Belcamp area along the N32, are among the largest halting site facilities provided by local authorities in Ireland. They contain an adult education centre and pre-school facilities and are located beside Dominick Park.

== Amenities ==
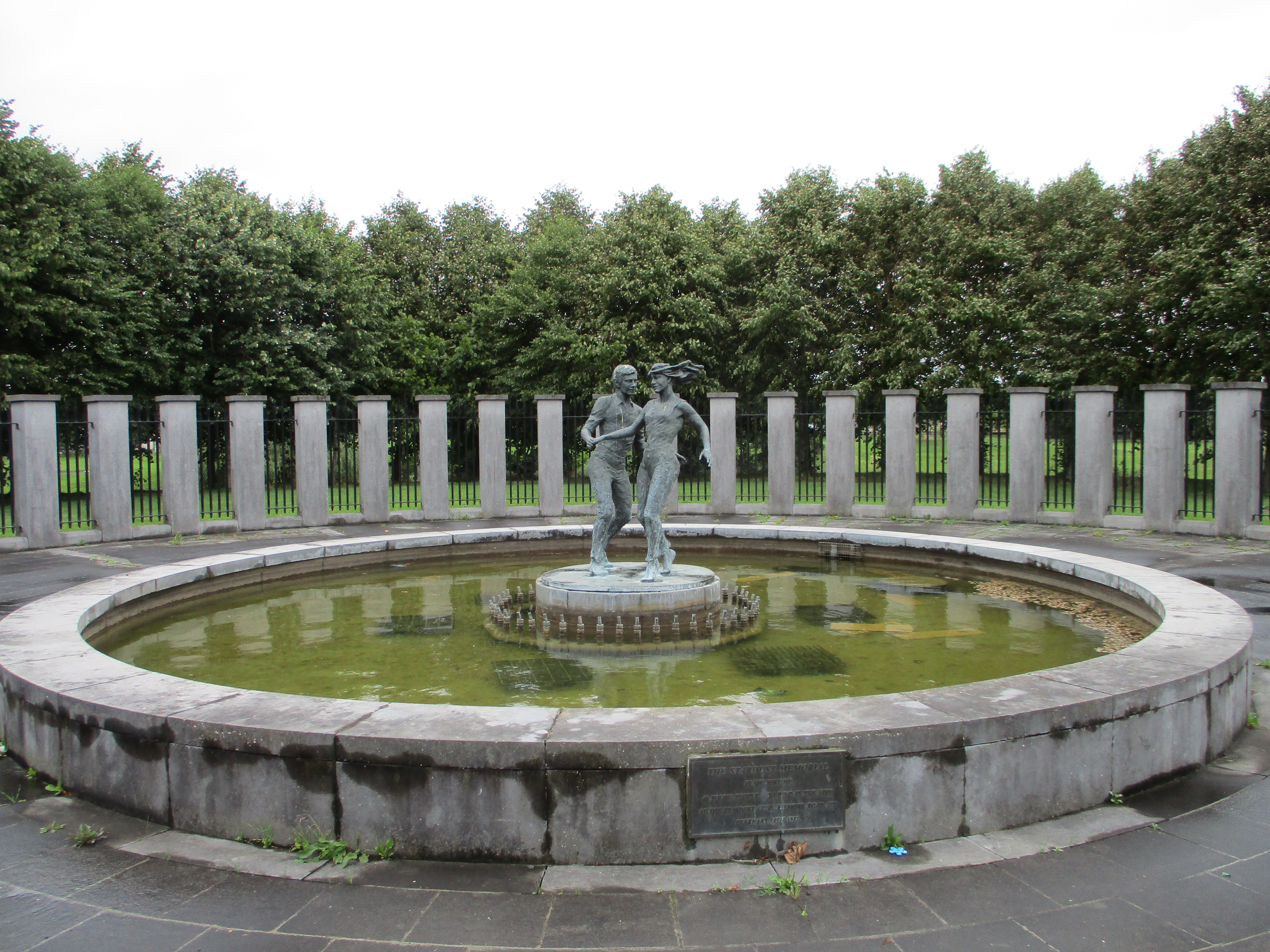
Dancing Couple memorial in Stardust Memorial Park

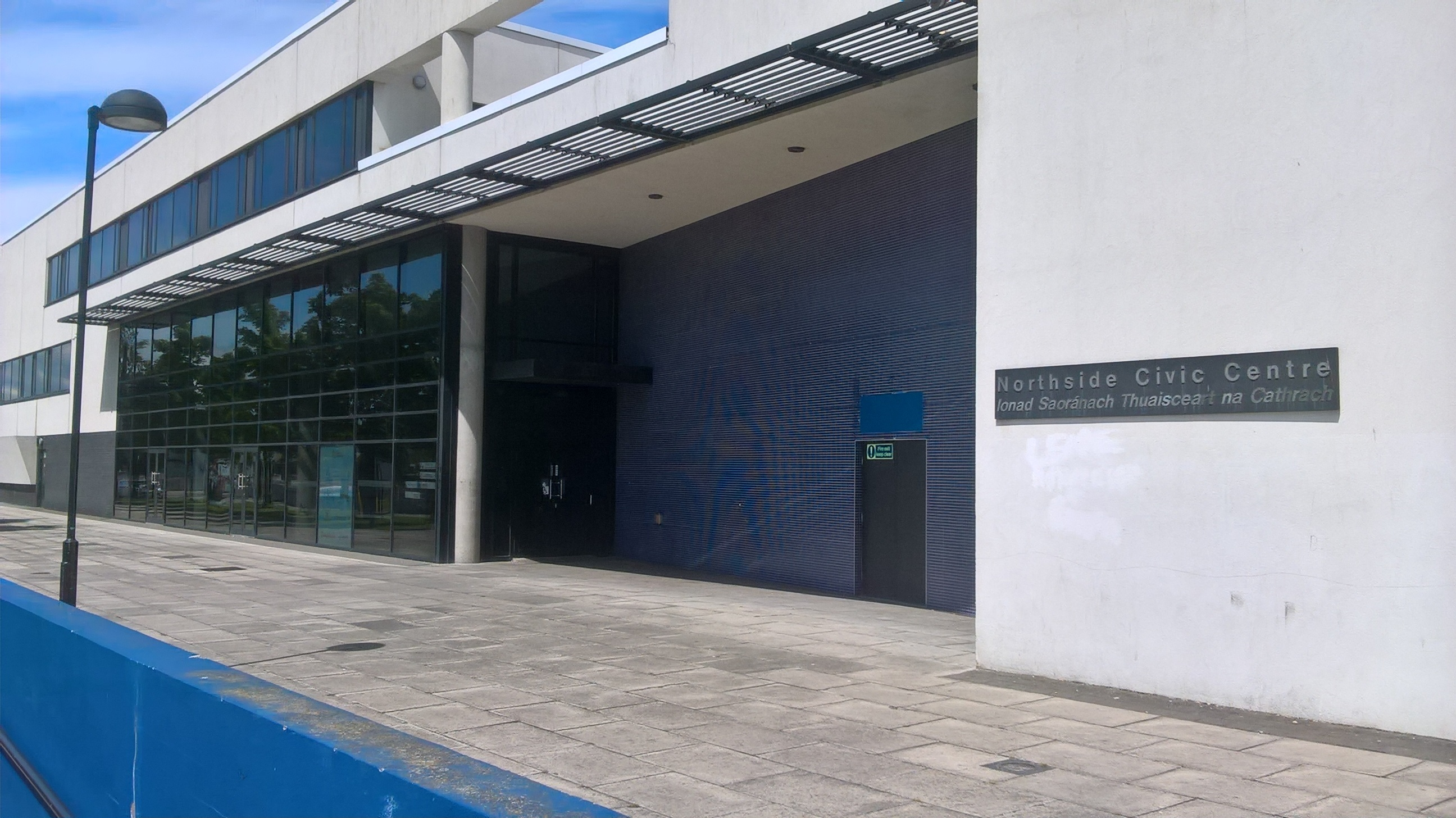
Northside Civic Centre

Public parks in the area include the Santry River Linear Park and in Bonnybrook the Stardust Memorial Garden which is dedicated to the 48 people who lost their lives in the Stardust nightclub. Parnells GAA club is based in Coolock village.

Coolock is also a centre of local government activity, with a Dublin City Council major centre, NEAR FM community radio station, a Health Services Executive centre and a recycling centre.

== Sub-divisions ==
Localities and housing developments in the Coolock area include:

- Ayrfield, an area beginning on the north side of the Tonlegee Road, predominantly within the Dublin 13 postal code, containing several estates such as Rathvale, Limewood (part of Dublin 5), Millbrook, Slademore, Foxhill, Greenwood and Ard na Greine. Ayrfield has one primary school, St. Pauls Junior and Senior National School. The main access road, Blunden Drive, is the home of Ayrfield Credit Union, Ayrfield Community Centre, Ayrfield United F.C. and O'Tooles GAC clubhouse and playing pitches. Ayrfield is also a parish in the Howth deanery of the Roman Catholic Archdiocese of Dublin. It is served by the Church of St Paul.
- Belcamp, today comprising some housing between Darndale and Priorswood but historically referring to a broader rural area. It is situated near the site of the former Belcamp Cottage and included cottages demolished to make way for the N32 road. Belcamp Hall, designed by architect James Hoban is a feature.
- Bonnybrook, within the core of Coolock above the original village, is the site of the main shopping centre and has a Catholic church and primary school.
- Clonshaugh (Irish: Cluain Seach), (now in Dublin 17) stretches from the Clonshaugh Industrial Estate to the Athletic Union League, close to Baskin Lane. It includes the housing developments of Riverside and Newbury.
- Darndale, built as a range of social housing estates, east of Clonshaugh and west of Clare Hall. It comprises Buttercup Park, Marigold Court, Primrose Grove, Snowdrop Walk and Tulip Court.
- Greencastle, a locality within the core of Coolock, above the original village.
- Kilmore lies to the west of the Malahide Road and east of the M1, where Coolock meets Artane and Beaumont; Of this, Kilmore West is entirely within Coolock and includes the sub-locality of Cromcastle, which features the Cromcastle Court flats, which are numerous multi-storey council flat blocks in the same style as blocks in Kilbarrack.
- Priorswood, a small locality between Belcamp and Clonshaugh, comprising the housing estates of Moatview, Fairfield and Ferrycarrig.
- St. Brendan's Estate, located across the Malahide Road from Coolock village proper, and contains St. Brendan's Drive, Avenue and Park, Moatfield and Dunree Park.

Located between Donaghmede and Coolock is Clare Hall, a later housing estate, which includes a small shopping precinct, and the larger Clarehall Shopping Centre.

The area has a number of roads named after the 1969 Moon landing, including Tranquility Grove (after Tranquility Base), Eagle Park (Lunar Module Eagle), Apollo Way (Apollo 11), Armstrong Walk (Neil Armstrong) and Aldrin Walk (Buzz Aldrin).

== Religion ==
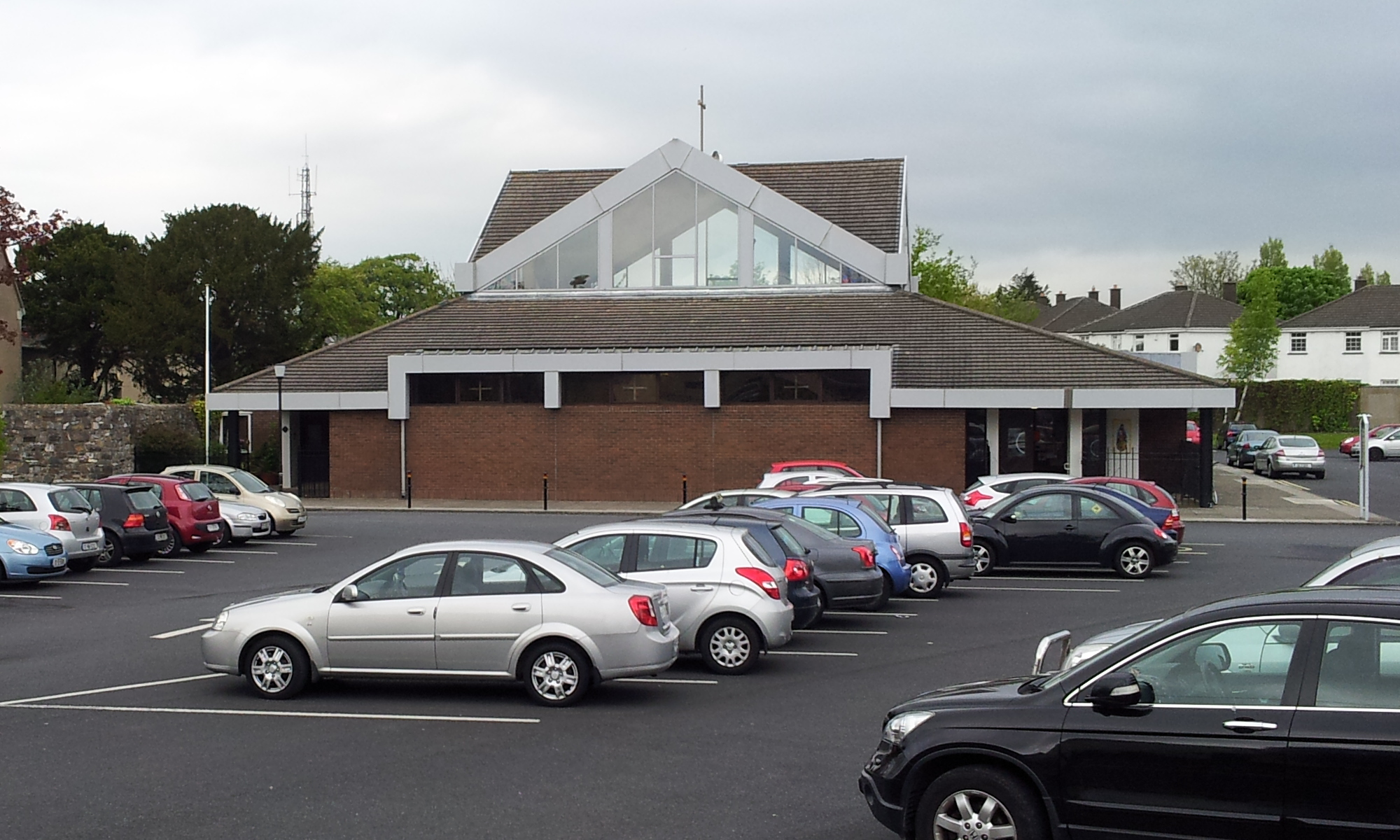
St. Brendan's Church, located in the centre of Coolock village

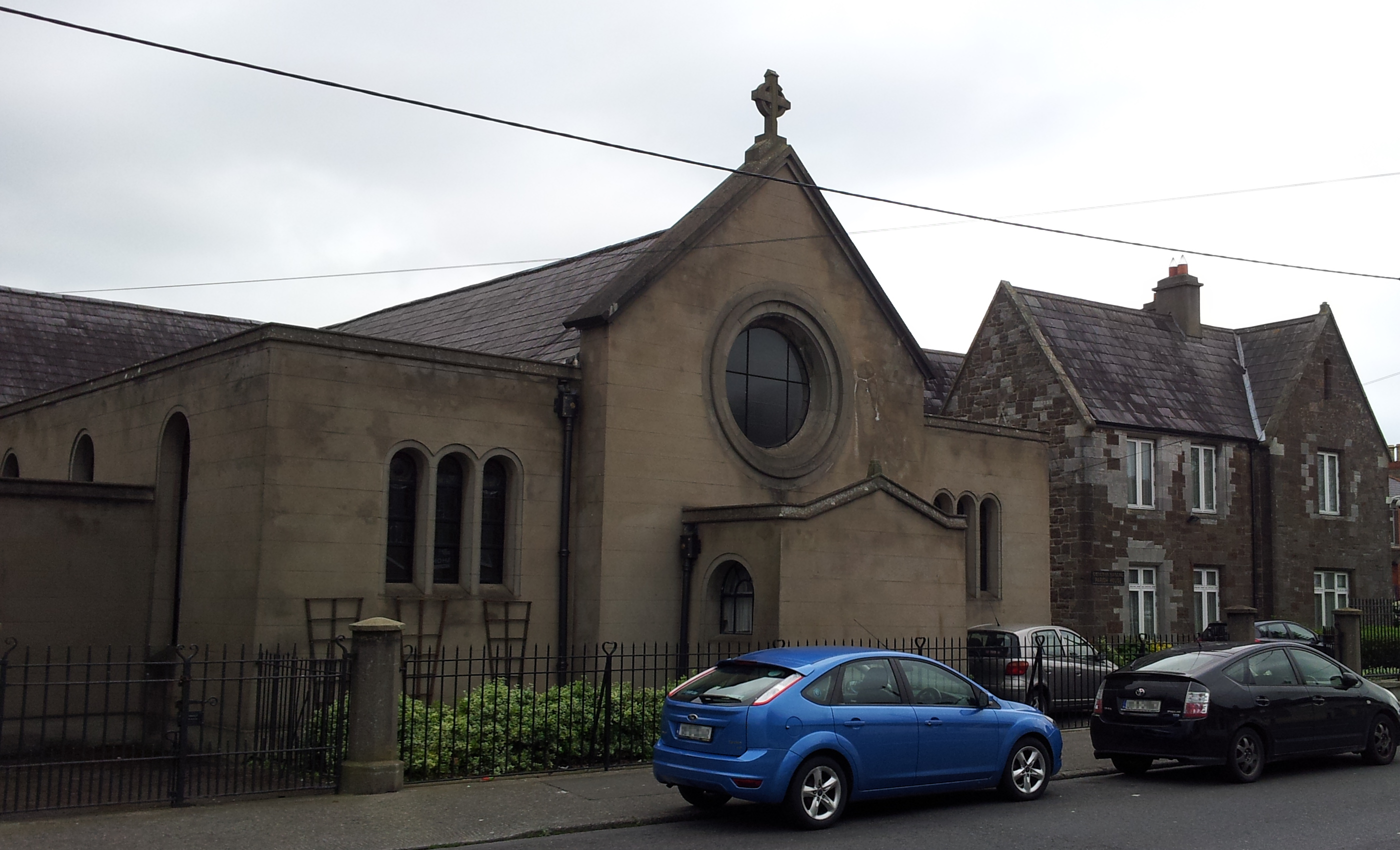
The old St Brendan's Church on Main Street

Coolock has given its name to religious divisions over a long period, and the primary historical ones are discussed at Parish of Coolock (Roman Catholic), and (from the Act of Supremacy), Parish of Coolock (Church of Ireland). Both Catholic (multiple) and Church of Ireland buildings stand within the area today. In the Catholic divisions, additional parishes today include Bonnybrook and Ayrfield (encompassing the Greenwood estate).

== Education ==
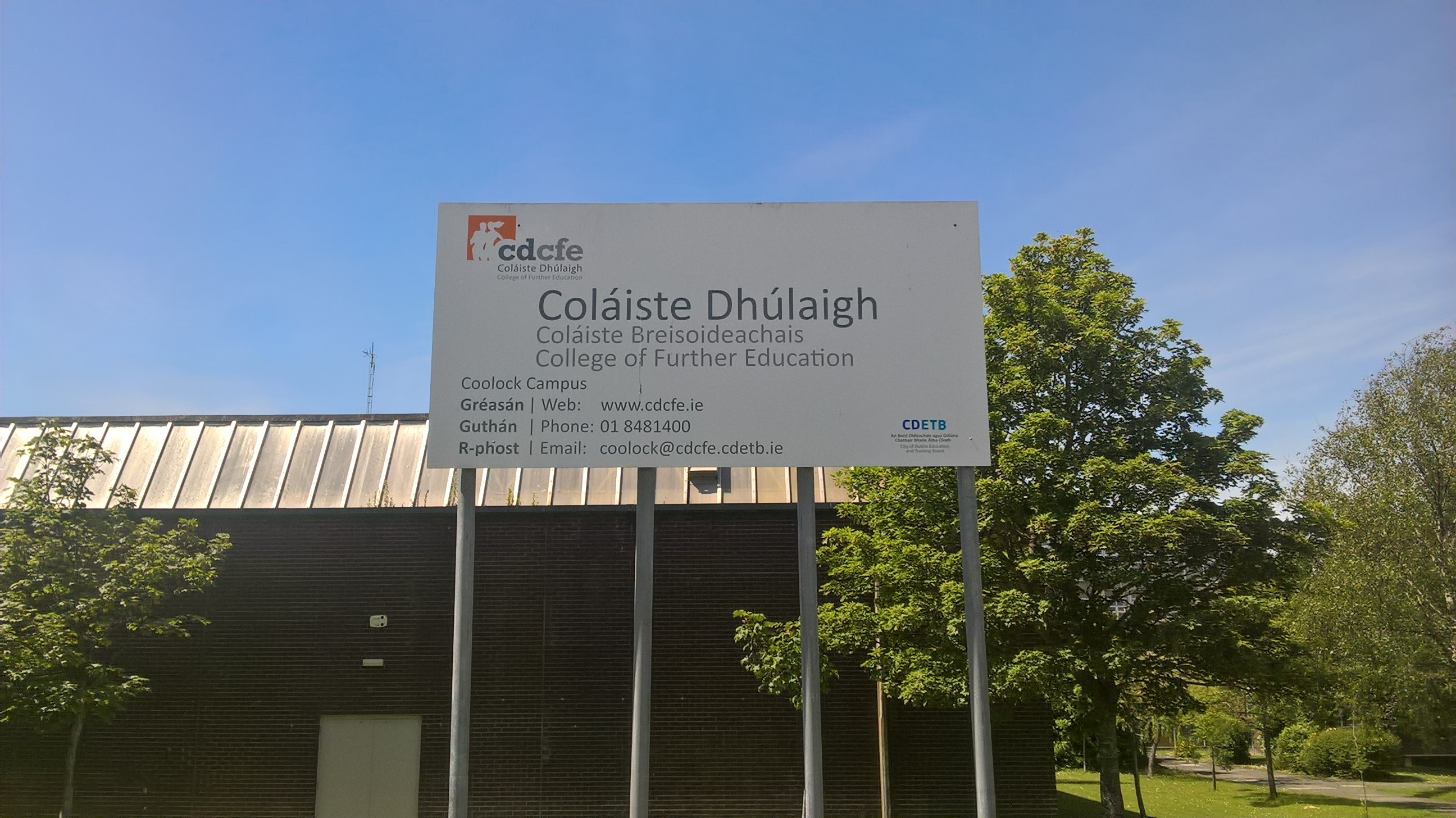
City of Dublin FET College Dhúlaigh Coolock

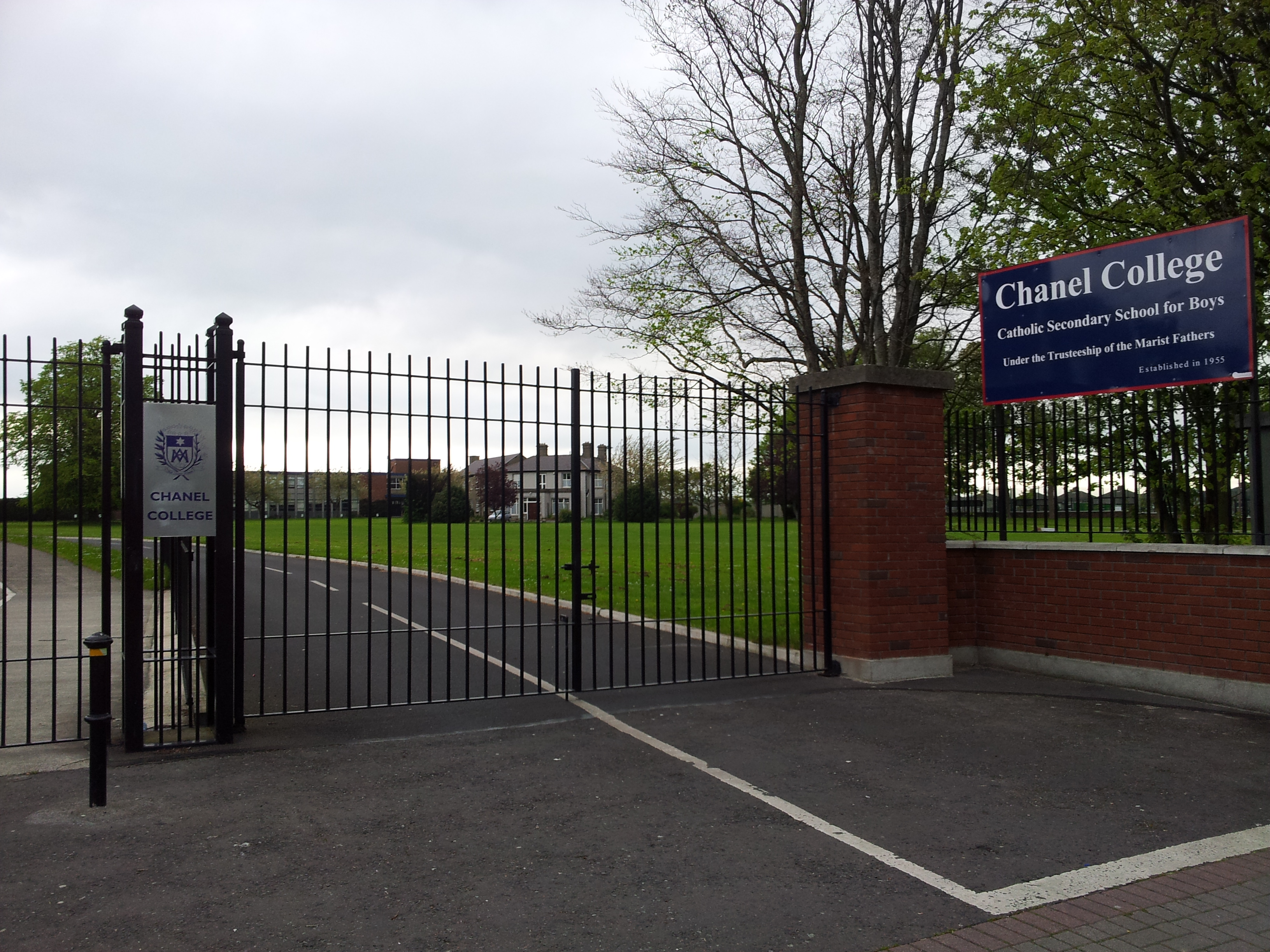
Entrance to Chanel College

National (primary) schools in the area include St. Pauls Junior and Senior National School (Ayrfield) and St. Francis Junior and Senior Schools (Priorswood).

Secondary schools include Chanel College (a boys school and adult education centre founded in 1955), the Donahies Community School (founded 1977), Coláiste Dhúlaigh Post Primary (a co-ed secondary school in Coolock), and Mercy College (a voluntary, Catholic girls secondary school). The now-defunct Catholic Belcamp College secondary school operated in nearby Balgriffin from 1893 to 2004.

City of Dublin FET College Dhúlaigh provides further education courses at certificate, diploma and a couple of degree levels (QQI, BTEC and FETAC).. Their degree courses are issued by England's University of Wolverhampton although students can stay in Dhúlaigh to do the courses and not have to travel to Wolverhampton.

== Businesses and retail facilities ==
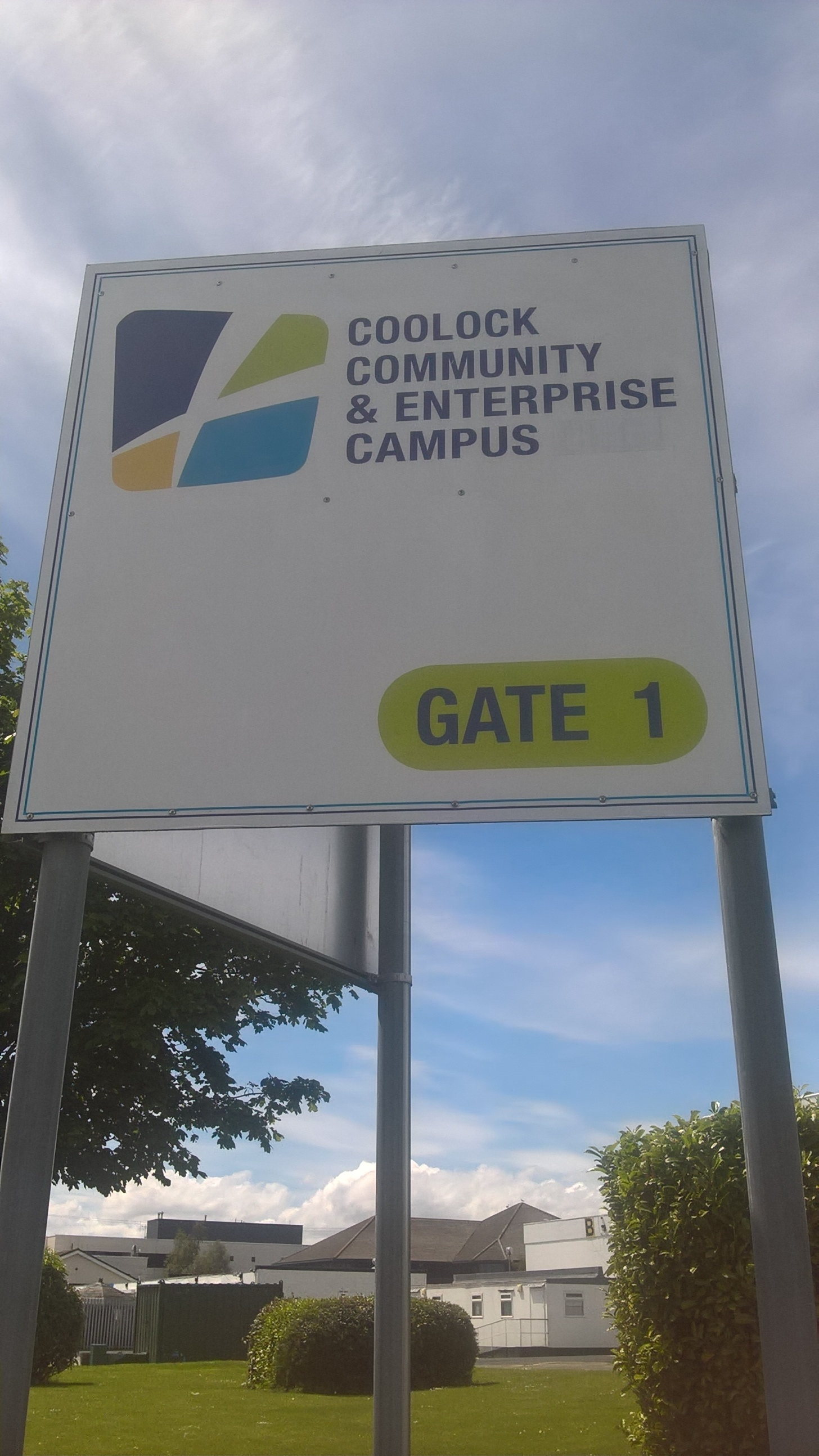
Coolock Community and Enterprise Campus sign

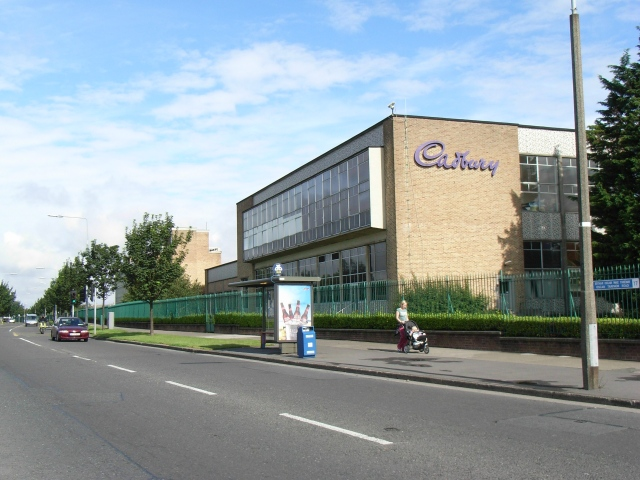
Cadbury's factory on Oscar Traynor Road.

The outskirts of Coolock host several factories and industrial estates. Cadbury Ireland has been manufacturing chocolate products since 1957, for both the Irish market and for export. The nearby Tayto Crisps factory manufactured snack foods until it closed in 2005.

Notable retail facilities include Northside Shopping Centre, Ireland's first covered shopping centre, situated near accesses to the M1 and M50, with more than 70 outlets and a city council swimming pool.

== Popular culture ==
Famous historical figures linked to the area included Henry Grattan of Belcamp Park, and the novelist Charles Lever.

The Coolock area was featured extensively during location shooting for the 1991 film The Commitments, directed by Alan Parker and starring a mainly unknown cast at the time.

== Transport ==
Coolock, which is not crossed by any rail systems, is serviced by main roads, including the R139 and Oscar Traynor Roads which link to the M1, and by the following Dublin Bus routes:

- N6 (operated by Go-Ahead Ireland)- Kilbarrack to Finglas (Finglas Village)
- 27 - Jobstown to Coolock (Clare Hall Avenue)
- 27A - Coolock (Blunden Drive) to Eden Quay
- 27B - Eden Quay to Harristown
- 27X - Belfield (U.C.D) to Clare Hall Avenue
- 42 - Lower Abbey Street to Malahide or Portmarnock
- 43 - Lower Abbey Street to Swords
- 15 - Ballycullen Road to Clongriffin

== See also ==
- List of subdivisions of County Dublin
- List of towns and villages in Ireland
