= Santry River =

Small river on northside of Dublin, Ireland

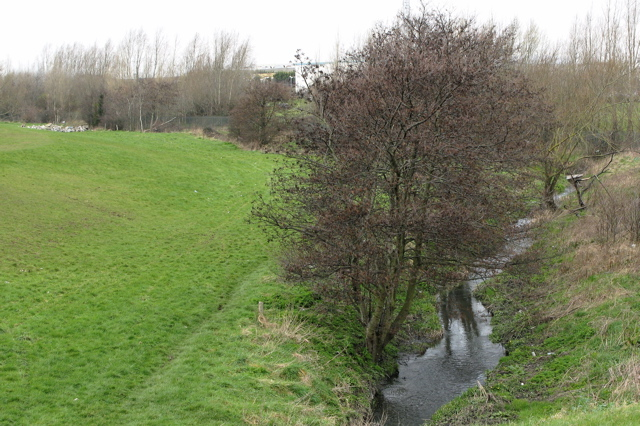
- Santry River, Kilmore, Dublin 5 / Dublin 17
- Native name: Abhainn Sheantraibh (Irish)

Physical characteristics
- Source
  - location: Harristown and Dubber, County Dublin
- Mouth
  - location: Dublin Bay (Raheny)

Basin features
- Tributaries
  - right: (artificial link from Naniken River)

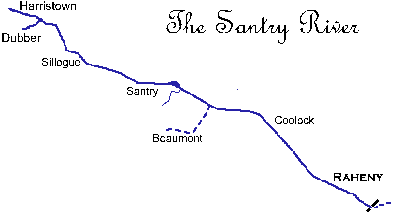
Sketch of the Santry River

Santry River (Irish: Abhainn Sheantraibh) is a small watercourse on the north side of Dublin city, one of the forty or so watercourses monitored by Dublin City Council. It runs, mostly unculverted, from Harristown and Dubber near Dublin Airport, through Santry and Coolock, reaching the sea at Raheny, in a lagoon area inshore of Bull Island.

== Course ==
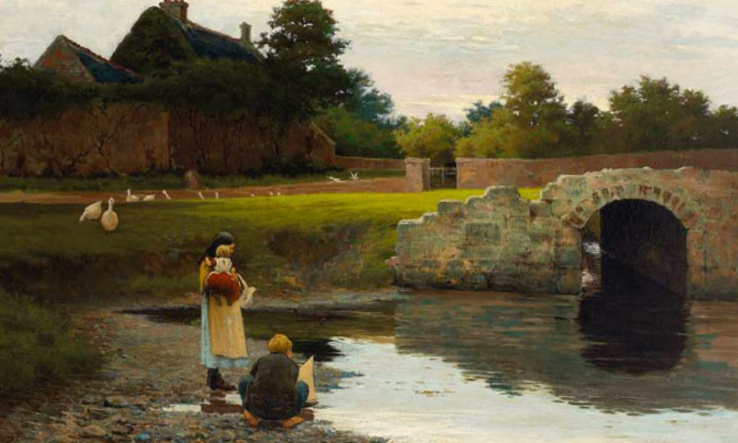
Santry River mouth from a Kavanagh painting, ca. 1895

The Santry River rises at an elevation of c. 80m, in the semi-rural areas of Harristown and Dubber in the part of County Dublin now part of the local government area of Fingal, near the village of St. Margaret's and Dublin Airport. The lead branch can be found at the end of a small lane in the former Harristown Demesne, now cut off by new road development. The river then flows along to the south of Dublin Airport (from which some tributary streams enter it), near the new Dublin Bus Harristown depot. With the Dubber branch, it passes for most of its upper course out in the open, flowing through Sillogue Public Golf Course and the northern fringe of Ballymun; up to this point, the main channel is sometimes called Quinn's River.

The river traverses Santry, where it forms a major feature of the former Santry Demesne, including the pond within what is now a public park adjacent to multiple housing and commercial developments. It then passes in turn under the old airport road and the M1 motorway. In Coolock, the river forms a central feature in the valley which cuts through the district, and features a pond, sometimes Coolock Lake, and a small cascade, running past the Stardust Memorial Park, and through the grounds of Cadbury's Ireland, where there is an EPA monitoring station and a tumulus on its banks, just before it passes under the Malahide Road.

The Santry passes the site of a covered holy well and enters Raheny near the beginning of Tonlegee Road, flowing alongside the Edenmore lands and past St. Joseph's Hospital. It continues through the village centre, alongside the grounds of Manor House School, and then, with two areas of culverting, at the beginning and end of the former Bettyglen Estate, and reaches the sea alongside a surface water outfall. Its mouth forms part of the eastern "lagoon" behind North Bull Island. The flow crosses mudflats and salt marsh to enter Sutton Creek. The lower stretch of the river is occasionally noted as "Raheny River", for example in provisions made by Lord Ardiluan allowing for the construction of the former coastal tramline.

=== Drainage link from Naniken River ===
The dotted line on the above sketch is an artificial link made by Dublin Corporation between the Santry River and the Naniken River, to reduce the flow of the latter and to allow handling of any flooding in either watercourse. It runs at the western end of Kilmore West in Coolock.

== Nearby catchments ==
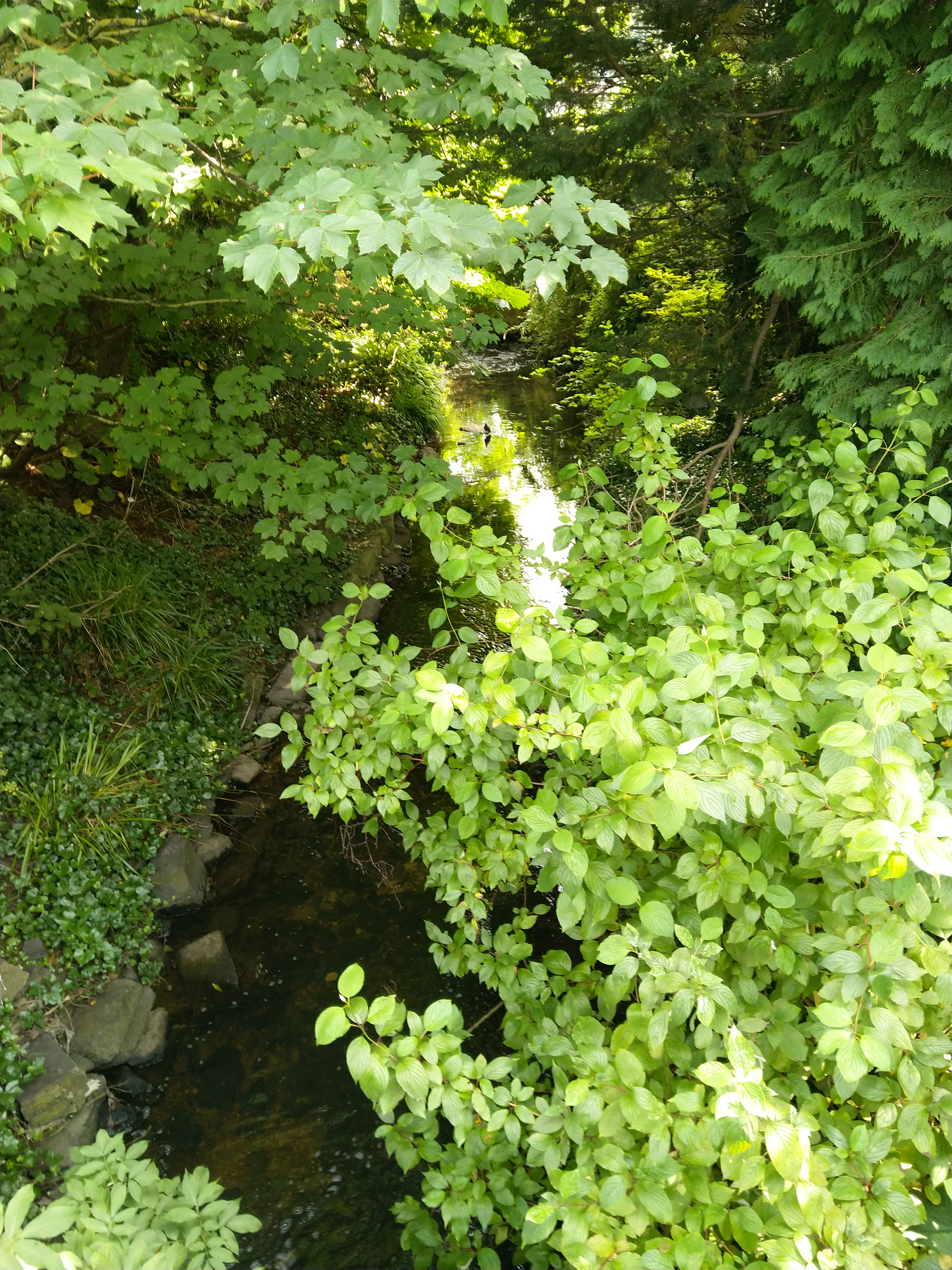
Santry River at Raheny village

In its upper reaches, the Santry drainage basin is bordered by that of the Wad River, which comes to the sea at the city end of Clontarf, and that of the Mayne River system, which concludes at Baldoyle Bay. Citywards, the Naniken basin lies closer to the city, while to the north and east two small streams drain parts of Edenmore and Raheny; these two watercourses are the Fox Stream, reaching the sea at the end of Fox's Lane, and the Blackbanks Stream, with its mouth where Howth Road and the James Larkin Road meet.

== History ==
There was once a watermill, sometimes described as "The Mill of Raheny" on Watermill Road near the coast, and just downstream a small stone quay by the river's mouth. The area including the mouths of the Naniken and Santry was for a time known as Raheny Strand, and oysters were sometimes harvested there.

The river may, in whole or part, have been known as Skillings Glas.

== Studies ==
As part of the management of the river, the Santry river was one of the "third tier" rivers numerically mapped within the Greater Dublin Strategic Drainage Study, with floodplain hydraulics computed (the other rivers being the Carrickmines, Deansgrange or Kill of the Grange, Poddle, Camac, Finglas and Mayne, along with one of the two second-tier waterways, the Tolka).

== Incidents ==
The Santry river has been noted for pollution incidents over the years, with industrial effluent and building material the most common causes (some of the latter once caused the main pond by the Stardust Memorial to be drained and reformed). There is a motorbike in the river in Stardust Memorial Park.
