= Raheny parish (Roman Catholic) =

Catholic parish, Dublin, Ireland

The Parish of Raheny is the modern successor in the Roman Catholic Church to an early (1152) parish, in Raheny, a district of Dublin, Ireland, reputed to be a site of Christian settlement back to at least 570 A.D. Today's parish, within the Howth Deanery of the Roman Catholic Archdiocese of Dublin, comprises Raheny village and the central portion of the district, parts of which are also served by the parishes of Killester, Grange Park and Kilbarrack-Foxfield. The parish has a membership of around 10,000 Catholics. Similarly centred, and covering a greater land area but a much smaller membership, is the Church of Ireland parish of the same name.

== History ==
=== Early history ===
The Celtic Church was primarily based around monastic settlements, and it is a local tradition that the area's patron saint, St. Assam, possibly a disciple of St. Patrick, established a church here. Around the start of the second millennium, part of the area was subject to a small monastic settlement, linked to St. Nessan, on Ireland's Eye, and around 1039, territories thought to be Portrane, Baldoyle and Raheny were in the possession of the Danish king of Dublin, Sigtrygg Silkbeard, who granted farmland in the area to Christ Church Cathedral, newly established under the first Bishop of Dublin, Donat (at that time the parish itself lay in the Diocese of Glendalough, the proto-Diocese of Dublin being confined to the walled city).

In the 12th century, the Church in Ireland moved towards a parochial model, and following restructuring under figures such as St. Malachy, Archbishop of Armagh, and the Papal Legate Cardinal Paparo in 1152, thirty-eight dioceses, each comprising a number of parishes, were approved. The Diocese of Dublin, previously a small "island" in the middle of the vast Diocese of Glendalough, was raised to the status of Archdiocese, with forty parishes, one of which was Raheny, in the Deanery of Fingal. The boundaries of this ancient parish are probably best reflected today in those of the Civil Parish, and of the Church of Ireland parish of the same name. Shortly after formation, the Anglo-Norman invasion impacted the whole Dublin region, and Raheny changed hands more than once in the following years, though it is not always clear what effect such changes had on the Church locally. In 1171, a Dane called Gill Mololmoa (Gilcolm) was a landholder in the area, and around this time, part of Raheny (Rathenny) was taken from Gilcolm and granted by Strongbow to the Norman knight John deCourcey, a descendant of whose, of the same name, was "Lord of Rathenny and Kilbarrock" at the beginning of the 13th century. By 1225, much of Raheny still belonged to Christ Church, but some appears to have been in the hands of St. Mary's Abbey, who acquired Christ Church's part in a swap; these holdings are confirmed in a papal bull (Pope Clement III) of 1189, and a renewed grant by King John, which specifically mentions a church building. There are further references in abbey records of 1296 and 1310, and the church, along with those of Grange (Baldoyle) and Coolock, is mentioned in a will of 1472. The only clergyman mentioned for the period up to 1615 was one Thomas, a rector appointed by the Crown, who was in office in 1226; in fact, for much of this period, it is believed that the local rector or curate, as the offices were then known, was appointed by St. Mary's Abbey.

=== From the dissolution of the monasteries to 1909 ===
At the dissolution of the monasteries, while St. Mary's survived in 1537, it was closed in 1539, and its lands at Raheny passed to the Crown, and on to, largely, the Lords of Howth. This also ended the right of presentation of the abbey and its prior, and the closure of the church or chapel at Raheny. During the English Reformation when Henry VIII of England broke with the papacy, the Anglican Churches came into being and sometime between this point and the early years of the reign of Elizabeth I (see Elizabethan Settlement), there emerged two Parishes of Raheny, one in the Roman Catholic Church, one in the Church of Ireland. There is no record of the original church during this time, and as happened in many parishes, it may have been allowed to fall into ruin, but parishioners are known to have attended the small chapel in inland Baldoyle later known as Grange Abbey.

The Catholic Church in Ireland came under increasing pressure, and with the assumption of control of properties by the new Church of Ireland, found itself without many places of worship, and with its priests under suspicion. One consequence of this was that it became impossible to continue to operate all the historical parishes, and at the Synod of Leinster at Kilkenny in 1614, many were grouped. It was at this time that the Union Parish of Coolock was formed, combining the existing parishes, of widely differing size and population, of Raheny, Glasnevin, Clonturk (also known as Drumcondra), Santry, Clontarf, Killester, Artaine (or Tartaine) and Coolock itself. The chief office of the new parishes was designated as "Parish Priest". The distinct identity of the constituent parishes such as Raheny remained, at least to some degree, and there are references to them in documents over the centuries.

The old church site saw the building of a Church of Ireland church in 1609, the remains of the 1712 successor of which can still be seen today.

Raheny remained part of the Union Parish of Coolock until 1829, and the article on that parish contains the general history of the Union. Notably, until 1859, Raheny had no Catholic place of worship, though mass was undoubtedly said in houses from time to time, and after 1689, there was a form of chapel at Coolock, accessible directly by a country lane. In 1829, the Union Parish was redesignated as the Parish of Clontarf, and its general history continues in that article.

For many years, Raheny continued as a quiet constituent area, with local people mostly attending mass at Coolock chapel, and some at Clontarf. Then, in the 1850s, the parish priest secured land at the top of Main Street, and commenced collection of subscriptions for a new church there; contributions came from both Catholics and Protestants. A design was commissioned by the well-known architect Patrick Byrne, who also worked on a number of other churches, and the first stone of the newer St. Assam's Church was laid in 1859. The church was officially opened in 1864 by the Catholic Archbishop of Dublin, Dr. Cullen, and there are fuller details in the church article.

=== Late 19th century ===
In 1879, following the death of the parish priest of the Union Parish of Clontarf in 1878, it was divided, and two new Unions created, one designated the Parish of Fairview, taking in the ancient parishes of Drumcondra, Glasnevin, Santry and Artaine, and a new Union Parish of Clontarf, comprising Clontarf, Raheny, Coolock and Killester. On the death of the Parish Priest, Archdeacon O'Neill, in 1909, the parish was divided again, a new Union of Coolock and Raheny (including Killester, and with the chaplaincy of Artaine Industrial School attached) was erected, with the first parish priest of this entity being Patrick Doyle.

=== Early to mid-20th century ===
The Raheny National Schools complex was built between 1953 and 1958, replacing the older schools, except for Springdale National School.

On 29 March 1954, the Raheny Parish Committee under Union Parish Priest Fr. W.J. Fitzpatrick launched the Raheny Newsletter, to keep locals apprised of the work of the committee and priests, and to discuss both local history and future planning. It was noted that the area then held 280 Catholic families (around 1200 people), that the new St. Anne's development would bring around 600 more households, and would be followed by Dublin Corporation work in Edenmore and Kilbarrack. It is not clear how long this newsletter survived.

In 1955, two new unions were formed, one comprising Raheny and Killester, the other being designated Coolock-Artane. In the late 1950s, the Edenmore locality of Raheny began to develop as a new centre of population and in the 1960s, the parish developed schools and a church there. In January 1960, the parish launched the memorable magazine The Acorn, which documented its work and also a great deal of local history. The Editor of the Acorn was local resident and journalist Laurence Joseph "Joe" McCullagh, who lived on St. Assams Road; an archive of the journal is held at Raheny Library.

=== From 1966 ===
On 1 July 1966, Raheny and Killester reemerged as separate parishes, though somewhat changed from their old boundaries, and Edenmore was organised as a further parish, taking in some land from Coolock-Artane parish also. Raheny was reduced in scale by the erection of Grange Park as a new parish in 1971 and in turn, Donaghmede parish was formed from the northern area of this in 1974. Later changes included the development of Foxfield-St. John (begun in 1971 from Bayside, itself a division of Kilbarrack from part of another large Union, which took in the ancient territories of Howth and Sutton, as well as Baldoyle, for which it was named) as a new parish, later renamed Kilbarrack-Foxfield. In July 2007, Edenmore and Grange Park parishes were placed under a single Parish Priest.

== Parish operations ==
Raheny today has around 10,000 members and two priests. In addition to the parish church, it is supported by the order church at the Capuchin Friary on Station Road, and is home to groups from a number of religious orders (e.g. Poor Servants of the Mother of God, Daughters of the Holy Spirit, Holy Spirit Missionary Sisters).

The parish publishes a weekly newsletter on Saturday evening (since 1997), a children's newsletter, and supports the local Raheny News (the "Green Paper"), published each Sunday morning from around October to May for over thirty years. In 2005, the current form of Parish Pastoral Council was launched, succeeding an older group which had launched many parish projects; it has the two clergy, 5 appointed members and 7 nominated from among parishioners. Associated groups work on liturgical matters, baptism, bereavement and visitation, and run the Parish Book and Newspaper Shops, and the Video Library. There is also a Parish Finance Committee.

The Church has worked with the neighbouring Church of Ireland parish on events such as Parish Pilgrimages and Women's World Day of Prayer.

=== The Church of Our Lady, Mother of Divine Grace ===
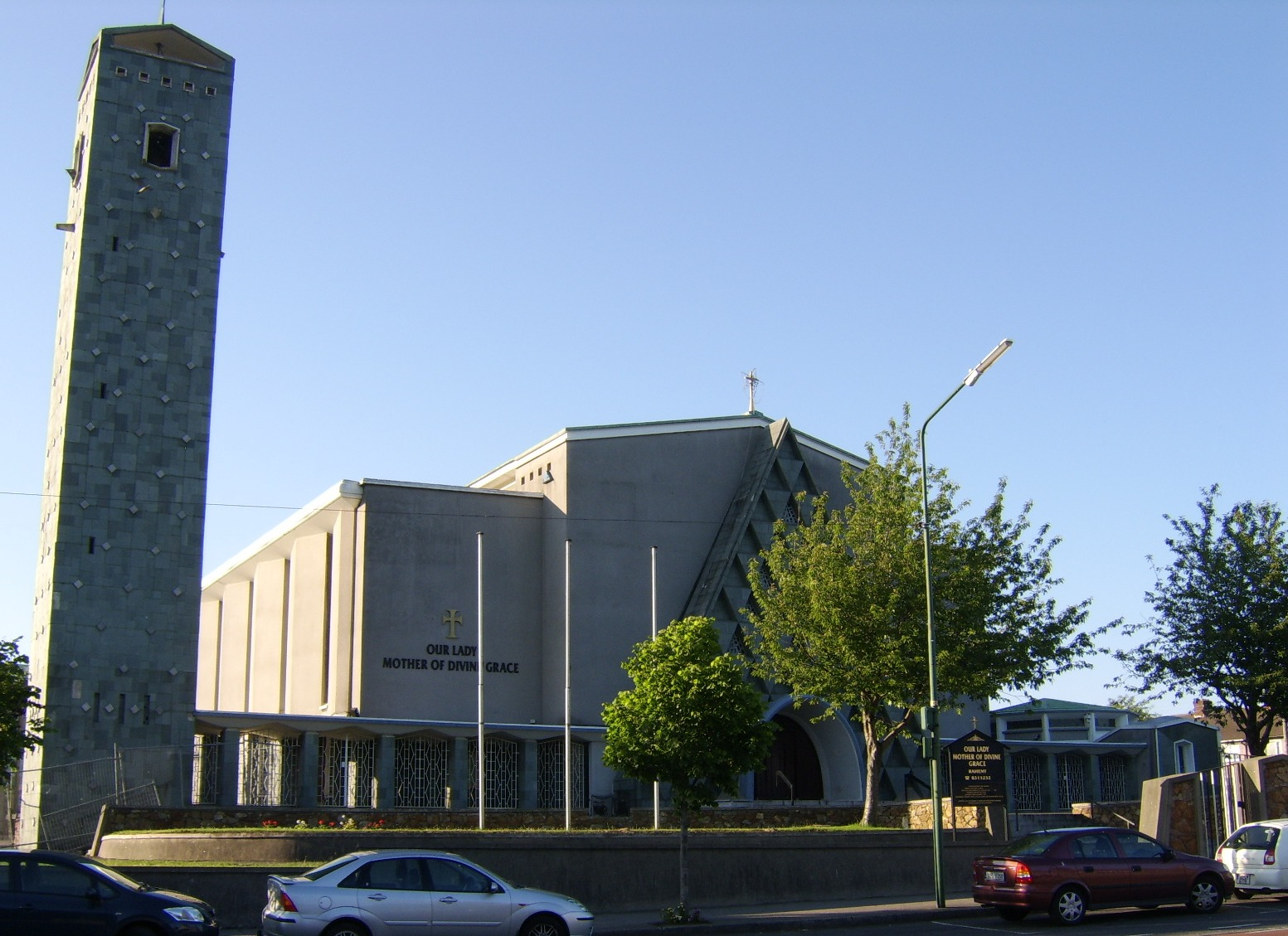
Church of Our Lady Mother of Divine Grace, as built

The site of St. Assam's Well, a holy well from ancient times, a field known as "The Shrubbery", at the very centre of the developing village, used occasionally for games, had been bought in 1952 to provide for succession to the popular but overloaded St. Assam's Church of 1859. The first sod was turned on 3 May 1959, and the foundation stone for the new Church of Our Lady, Mother of Divine Grace was blessed and laid by Archbishop J.C. McQuaid in the presence of Fr. Dr. Fitzpatrick. P.P. on 24 April 1960. On 22 July 1962, the church was blessed, dedicated and opened, also by Archbishop J.C. McQuaid, with now Monsignor Dr. Fitzpatrick, Parish Priest, Vicar Forane and historian, and a substantial congregation. The Ceremony of Blessing and Dedication began at 11.30 and was followed by full High Mass at 12 noon. The new church immediately entered service, while for the next few years the surrounding grounds were completed, mostly by volunteers, and the car park prepared.

== Parish priests ==
=== Parish priests of the Union of Coolock ===
The priests of the Union of the Parishes of Coolock, Clontarf, Raheny, Artaine, Killester, Clonturk, Santry and Glasnevin were:

- Rev. James Drake, fl. 1620
- Rev. Richard Cahill, fl. 1680
- Rev. (Charles) Cormac Cassidy, fl. 1704?
- Rev. Nicholas Gernon, fl. 1720
- V. Rev. Andrew Canon Tuite, 1733-
- V. Rev. T. Canon McLoughlin, 1771-
- V. Rev. John Canon Larkin, 1785-
- V. Rev. Patrick Canon Ryan, 1797-
- V. Rev. Daniel Canon Murray, 1805
- V. Rev. Paul Long, 1805–

=== Parish priests of the Union of Clontarf ===
The priests of the Union of the Parishes of Coolock, Clontarf, Raheny, Artaine, Killester, Clonturk, Santry and Glasnevin were:

- V. Rev. James Canon Callanan, 1829–
- V. Rev. Canon Cornelius E. Rooney, 1846, presided over the establishment of St. Assam's Church

=== Parish priest of the Union of Coolock, Clontarf, Raheny, Artaine, Killester ===
- V. Rev. Patrick Archdeacon O'Neill, 1879

=== Parish priests of the Union of Coolock, Raheny, Artane, Killester ===
The priests of this Union, based around Coolock, were:

- V. Rev. Patrick Doyle, 1909–
- V. Rev. James McCarroll, 1924–
- V. Rev. Thomas J. Graham, 1933
- V. Rev. Gregory Byrne, 1933–
- Right Rev. Mgr. William J. Fitzpatrick, V.F., D.D., 1950–

=== Parish priests of the Union of Raheny and Killester ===
- Right Rev. Mgr. William J. Fitzpatrick, V.F. (then Vicar General, Archdiocese of Dublin), D.D., 1955–

Administered the combined parishes in a time of massive housing development and oversaw their separation. As Vicar Forane for the Deanery, Mgr. Fitzpatrick did much of the work of developing the church in north Dublin and Fingal, with massive new housing needing churches and schools, and played the same role in expanded form as Vicar-General of the Diocese from 1961.

=== Parish priests of Raheny ===
- Right Rev. Mgr. W. Fitzpatrick, V.G., D.D., 1966–1972, died 1972, first Parish Priest of Raheny alone for centuries; buried by parish church
- Very Rev. Joseph O'Hare, D.D., 1972–1982, died 1982, buried by parish church
- Very Rev. John F. Canon McHale, 1982–1996, Canon of Tassagard, Pastor Emeritus 1996–2007, died 2007, buried by parish church
- Very Rev. Thomas Kearney 1996–2005, later curate at Whitehall-Larkhill
- Right Rev. Mgr. Martin O'Shea, 2005–2014
- Rev. Michael Cullen

== See also ==
- List of parishes of the Roman Catholic Archdiocese of Dublin by deanery
