= Ardscoil La Salle, Raheny =

Second level school in Dublin, Ireland

Ardscoil La Salle

Location
- Dublin; Ireland; 53.3889°N 6.1696°W

Information
- Motto: Ad Summum Semper
- Established: 1968
- Headmaster: Michelle Benson (formerly Colm Mythen)
- Colours: Blue, Yellow
- Website: http://www.ardscoillasalle.ie/

Ardscoil La Salle ("De La Salle' or "The Della" as it is referred to by staff and students) is a co-educational voluntary Catholic secondary school located on the Raheny Road in Raheny, Dublin, Ireland.

== History ==
Ardscoil La Salle was founded in 1968 by the De La Salle Brothers, who had a residential base next door. The first Principal was Brother Cadogan and on his retirement Brother Benignus was appointed as Principal. Originally an all-boys school, it became co-educational in 1978, following initiatives by the Department of Education, and at this point the Marist Sisters joined the staff. It is a school in the De La Salle tradition sharing the mission of human and Christian education of young people.

== Operation ==
Ardscoil La Salle is a voluntary secondary school, funded by the Department of Education and part of the Le Cheile Catholic Schools Trust. A Board of Management, including representatives of parents, teachers and the trustees, the De La Salle Brothers, oversees the administration of the school. Day-to-day management of the school is the responsibility of the Principal who is also secretary to the Board of Management.

The school has multiple facilities including four science labs and home economics rooms, engineering room, woodwork room, building construction room, technical drawing room, lecture theatres, a large sports hall, an oratory, interview rooms and two large art rooms.

In 2012, it was announced that Ardscoil La Salle was requiring all new first year students to purchase Apple iPads as they move towards more interactive means of education.

== Curriculum ==
Ardscoil La Salle follows the curriculum programmes set down by the Department of Education and Science. Students take the Junior Cycle and Leaving Certificate/ Senior Cycle exams, and Transition Year is optional. The Leaving Certificate Applied and the Leaving Certificate Vocational Programme courses are also offered at the post Junior Cycle level.

=== Junior Cycle ===
First, second and third year students currently study the core subjects.

- Irish
- English
- Maths
- History
- Science
- Religious Education
- Physical Education
- Social, Personal and Health Education (S.P.H.E.)
- Civic, Social and Political Education (C.S.P.E.)

The optional subjects are sampled in the first term of first year before students make a decision on what two subjects they will pick.

- Home Economics
- Visual Art
- Graphics
- Engineering
- Wood Technology
- Business Studies
- Geography
- Modern Foreign Languages (French and Spanish)

=== Transition Year ===
Ardscoil La Salle offers Transition Year on an optional basis. A proportion of the material is based on the Leaving Certificate/Senior Cycle syllabus. Subjects studied include:

- Irish
- Maths
- English
- French
- Chemistry
- Biology
- Physics
- Art
- History
- Geography
- Physical Education
- Mini company (Business Studies)

=== Leaving Certificate ===
Fifth and sixth year students currently study the core subjects.

- Irish
- Maths
- English

Fifth and sixth years currently study the following non-exam subjects.

- Religious Education (R.E.)
- Relationships and Sexuality Education (R.S.E.)
- Physical Education (P.E.)

Students choose another four optional subjects in Transition Year/ 3rd year to study for their Leaving Certificate/ Senior Cycle.

- Modern Foreign Languages (French and Spanish)
- Chemistry
- Biology
- Physics
- History
- Geography
- Business Studies
- Home Economics
- Art
- Engineering
- Construction Studies

== Uniform ==
Students of Ardscoil la Salle are required to wear the full uniform during school hours and school outings, as per the uniform policy.

The boys' uniform consists of the school jumper, a blue shirt, a blue and silver striped tie, grey trousers and black shoes. The girls' uniform consists of the school jumper and tie, a white blouse, a royal blue skirt and black shoes. Female students can opt for grey trousers instead of the skirt. The school jumper is royal blue for Junior Cycle students, and navy blue for Transition Year and Leaving Certificate/ Senior Cycle students. Both variations include the school crest.

Students are recommended to buy a school coat for winter weather. Since the 2025/2026 academic year, students are required to wear the school tracksuit with black runners for the duration of the day that Physical Education is scheduled. The tracksuit is navy blue and royal blue, with the school crest.

== Extracurricular activities ==
During lunchtimes (13:00 - 13:40) on all school days except for Wednesday, students can attend extracurricular clubs and sports teams:

- Games Club
- Music Club
- Art Club
- Chess club
- Newspaper Club
- Prayer Club
- Debate Club
- Darts Club
- Badminton
- Basketball
- Soccer
- Gaelic Football
- Flag Football

The Prefect committee and Student Council oversee changes and events that take place in the school community.

In after-school hours, the school runs a Homework club and training for the sports teams.

== Notable people ==
- Jon Berkeley (b. 1962) - artist, past pupil
- Niall Boylan (b. 1963) - radio broadcaster
- Graham Dale (b. 1978) - author of The Green Marine, past pupil
- Martin King (b. 1963) - weather presenter on TV3, past pupil
- Gerry McCaul, former Dublin Gaelic footballer/manager, former Headmaster
- Vinny Murphy (b. 1969) - former Dublin Gaelic footballer, past pupil
