= Marie Elizabeth Hayes =

Irish medical missionary to India

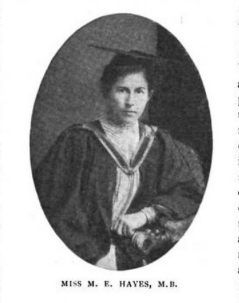
- Hayes, photographed before 1908
- Born: 17 May 1874; Raheny, Dublin, Ireland
- Died: 3 January 1908 (aged 33); Delhi, British India
- Education: Catholic University School of Medicine
- Occupations: Physician and medical missionary
- Known for: Medical mission work at Rewari and the Marie Hayes Ward, St Stephen's Hospital, Delhi

Marie Elizabeth Hayes (17 May 1874 – 3 January 1908) was an Irish physician and medical missionary. One of the early women to qualify in medicine in Ireland, in 1904, she served under the Cambridge Mission to Delhi in northern India and led the mission hospital at Rewari. She died of pneumonia in Delhi in 1908, and a ward at St Stephen's Hospital, Delhi was named in her memory.

== Early life ==
Hayes was born on 17 May 1874 in Raheny, Dublin, the eldest daughter of the Rev. Canon F. C. Hayes, rector of Raheny, and his wife Annabella Willson. When at home she worshipped at All Saints' Church, where her parents were members.

== Education ==
Hayes studied at Alexandra College in Dublin and, from 1898, read for a medical degree at the Catholic University of Ireland School of Medicine, whose degrees were conferred by the Royal University of Ireland; women were then barred from Trinity College Dublin, which did not admit women until 1904. She won first silver medals in surgery and pathology and shared first place in obstetrics. After a residency at the Coombe Hospital she was invited back as a clerk, and later spent six months at the Mater Misericordiae Hospital, one of the few Dublin hospitals that admitted women as residents. In the final degree examination of April 1904 she was the only woman to gain an "Upper Pass", and was conferred the MB, BCh and BAO degrees. Preparing for missionary service, she studied for three months at the London School of Tropical Medicine, trained at the Society for the Propagation of the Gospel (S.P.G.) hostel in Wandsworth, and learned Urdu; she also worked as a locum tenens at the Belfast Infirmary.

== Missionary service ==
Hayes was accepted by the S.P.G. in January 1905 and travelled that year to the Cambridge Mission to Delhi. The mission ran three hospitals: St Stephen's Hospital, Delhi, where she worked under Jenny Muller; a hospital at Karnal; and one at Rewari, which Hayes came to lead. Her work centred on women and children, including dispensary clinics and visits to secluded zenana households in a society that observed purdah. Owing to understaffing her workload was heavy throughout her service. She spent 26 months in India.

== Death ==
Hayes contracted pneumonia over Christmas 1907, by one account from a chill caught while attending a night case, and returned to Delhi at the New Year. The infection proved fatal, and she died on 3 January 1908, aged 33. (Note: At Work (1909) and the mission records date her death to 3 January 1908; some records, including probate, give 4 January.) Her funeral was held at St Stephen's Church in Delhi, and a memorial service was held at All Saints' Church, Raheny.

== Legacy ==
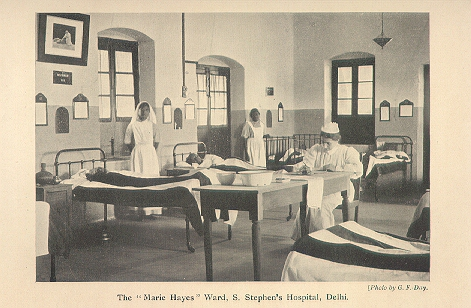
The Marie Hayes Ward at St Stephen's Hospital, Delhi, established in her memory

A memorial fund raised by friends, family and colleagues paid for a ward in the rebuilt St Stephen's Hospital, named the Marie Hayes Ward. In Raheny, a Celtic cross was erected in her memory at the centre of the village. Her mother published the letters Hayes had written home as At Work: Letters of Marie Elizabeth Hayes (1909), with an introduction by the Venerable G. R. Wynne, Archdeacon of Aghadoe.
