= Raheny =

Suburb of Dublin, Ireland

Raheny Ráth Eanaigh (Irish)
- Suburb (village core)
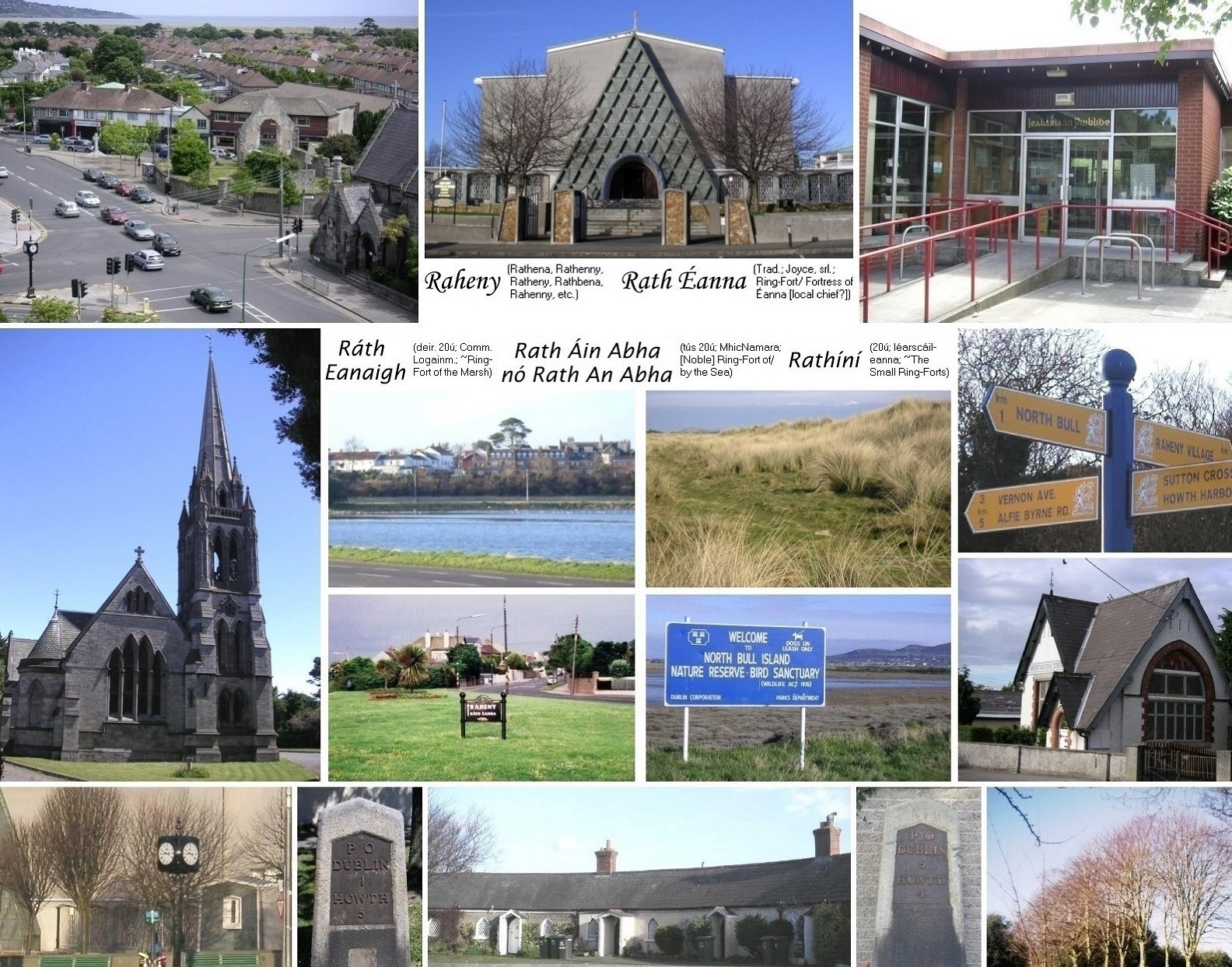

- Location in Ireland
- Coordinates: 53°22′49″N 6°10′30″W
- Country: Ireland
- Province: Leinster
- County: Dublin
- Council: Dublin City

Government
  - Dáil Éireann: Dublin Bay North
  - EU Parliament: Dublin

Area (Civil Parish, excluding sea)
  - Suburb (village core): 3.88 km^{2} (1.50 sq mi)
- Elevation (village centre): 20 m (66 ft)

Population (2006)
  - Urban: over 18 000 (census areas are not a match for districts)
- Area codes: 01, +353 1
- Website: www.raheny.com

Raheny (Irish: Ráth Eanaigh) is a northern suburb of Dublin, Ireland, halfway from the city centre to Howth. It is centred on a historic settlement, first documented in 570 AD (Mervyn Archdall). The district shares Dublin's two largest municipal parks, Saint Anne's Park and Bull Island with its 4.5 km beach, with neighbouring Clontarf, and is crossed by several small watercourses.

The coastal hamlet grew rapidly in the 20th century and is now a mid-density, chiefly residential, Northside suburb with a village core. It is home to a range of retail and banking outlets, multiple sports groups including two golf courses, several schools and churches, Dublin's second-busiest library and a Garda station.

Raheny is also a civil parish in the ancient barony of Coolock.

== Location and access ==
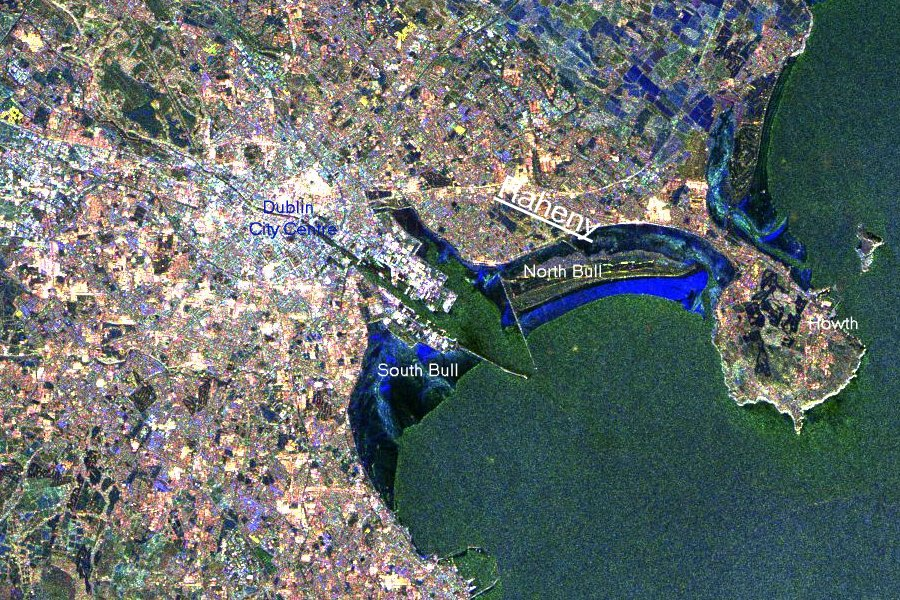
Raheny today, in the context of Dublin, by satellite

Raheny runs from the coast inland, with its centre about eight kilometres (5.0 mi) from Dublin city centre and seven kilometres (4.3 mi) from Dublin Airport. It is administered by Dublin City Council. The county boundary with Fingal lies close by, where Raheny meets Kilbarrack. Nearby areas include Killester, Clontarf, Artane, Kilbarrack, Coolock and Donaghmede, and the skyline is dominated by Howth Head. Raheny is bisected by the Howth Road (R105) and the R809 (from Bull Island via in turn Watermill Road, Main Street, Station Road) and is also accessed from the Malahide Road (R107), the coastal James Larkin Road (R807) and the R104 (including the Oscar Traynor Road and Kilbarrack Road).

Raheny railway station, opened on 25 May 1844, overlooking the village centre, serves the DART suburban railway system and the Dublin-Belfast main line, and parts of Raheny are served by other DART stations, Harmonstown and Kilbarrack, on the same line. Raheny is also served by Dublin Bus (routes H1, H2 and H3) and has a taxi rank.

Much of the district is situated on gently rising ground, with a bluff overlooking Bull Island at Maywood and Bettyglen, and further rises from the village centre to the station and then to Belmont or Mount Olive, a hill which once featured a windmill. Opposite and beyond Belmont was once an area of sunken land with limestone quarries but this was landfilled, much of it with urban refuse, and then partly levelled and converted into a city park, Edenmore Park, in the late 1960s.

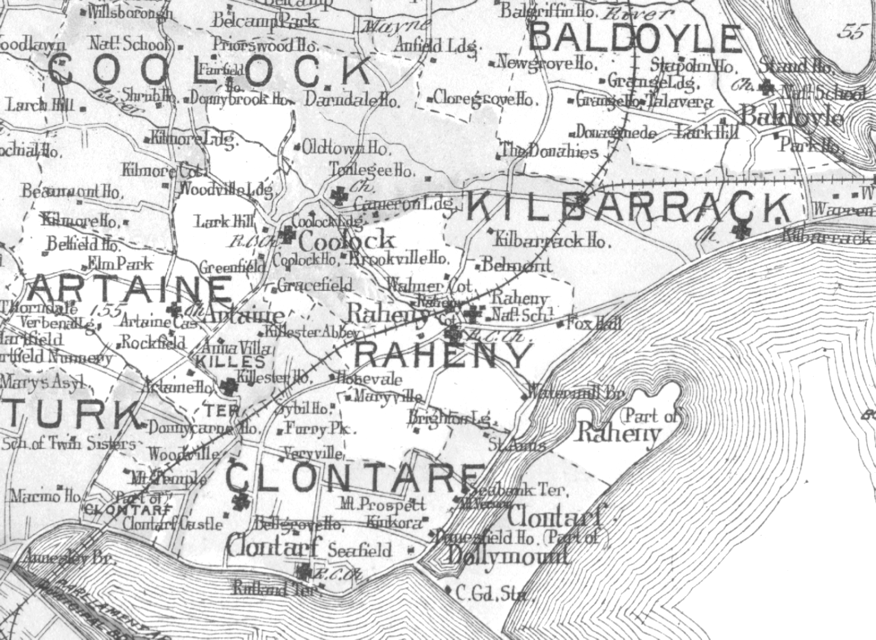
Raheny and neighbouring districts, early 20th century

== Historical features ==
=== Ráth (ringfort) ===
Within Raheny lies the remains of a large ringfort (or ráth) from which the area gets its name. The ráth extends under the centre of the modern village, from beside the Santry River, including some marshy ground, to the Roman Catholic church, Windsor Motors, the Scout Den and the two St. Assam's Churches. Some excavations were carried out in the 1970s, giving an idea of its size (probably c. 110m across) and structure. The old church and graveyard complex behind the village plaza may reflect a remnant of the rath, as does some embankment behind the Scout Den.

During the 19th century, significant changes to the village, especially the centre, occurred, as a result of work on the Howth Road by the Telford Engineering Company; prior to this, the road entered the village at the bottom of the central hill, turning sharply coastwards at the top of Main Street. Works to straighten the road resulted in a reduction of the old ringfort.

=== Religious sites ===
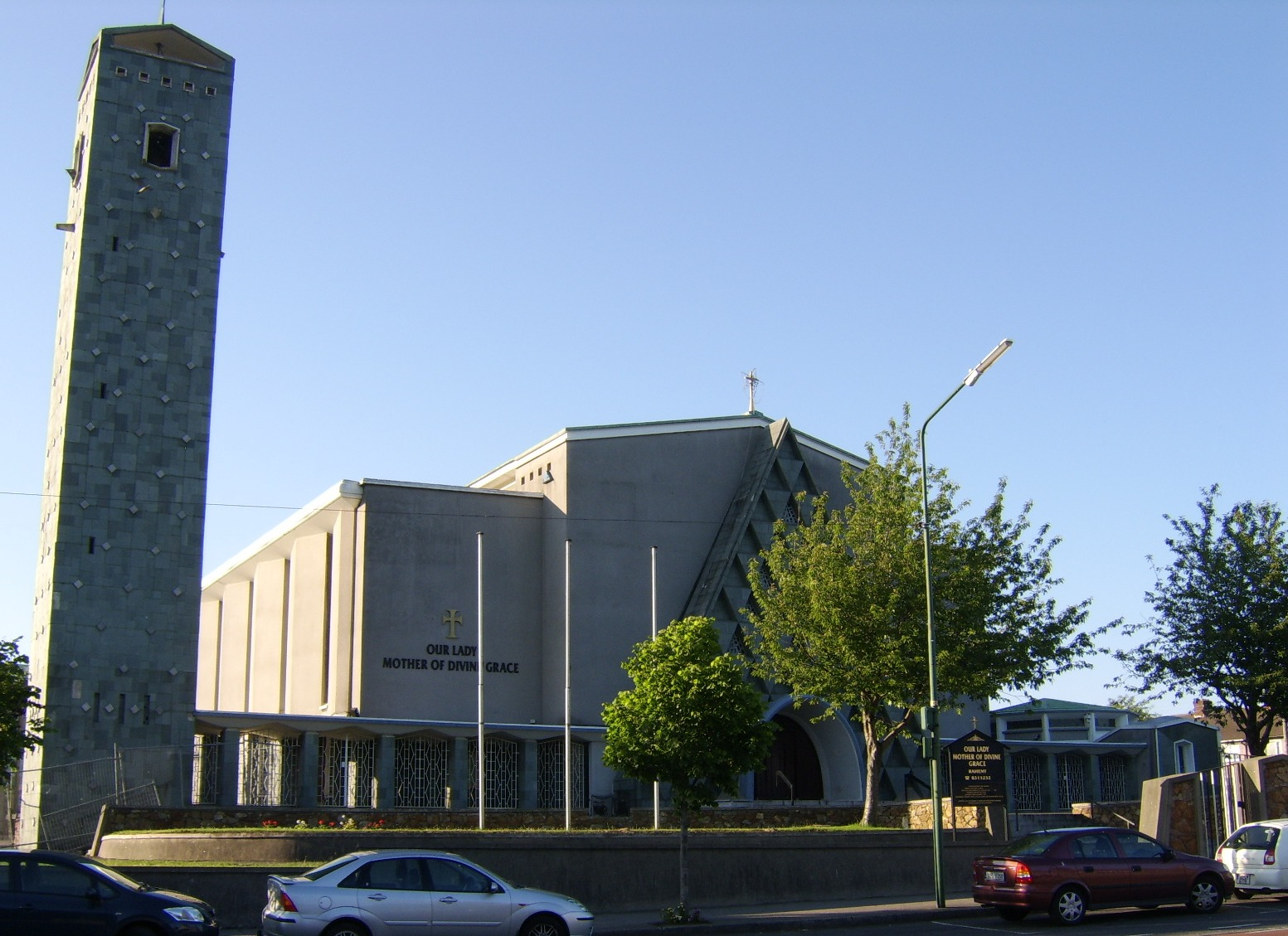
Church of Our Lady Mother of Divine Grace

The ruined St. Assam's Church, dating from a 1712 reconstruction of a 1609 building, is believed to be the successor to early religious settlement. The later St. Assam's Church, opposite it, was built from 1859, in the period when Roman Catholics regained the right to have their own churches and opened in 1864.

Raheny was also the site of two holy wells. The first of these, St. Ann's Well, gave its name to St. Anne's Park. The site of this well is still visible under a stone cupola by the boating lake in the park, but it has been dry for several decades, despite efforts by municipal authorities to restart it. The second well, dedicated to the patron saint of the area, St. Assam, lay in the field which now holds the Church of Our Lady Mother of Divine Grace. When last recorded, it was marked by a depression in the ground but was later, in the 20th century, covered over, and its waters diverted into the Santry River.

The "Celtic-style" cross on display in the village (now on the main plaza but previously placed in other locations, including at the junctions of Main Street and Watermill Lane, and of Watermill Land and Howth Road) is a memorial to Marie Elizabeth Hayes, an early female medical graduate and 19th-century medical missionary from the area to India, paid for by locals in the area in which the doctor worked.

=== Raheny Heritage Trail and guides ===
In 1992, the Raheny Heritage Society published a walking guide, the Raheny Heritage Trail, which included a general introduction to the area and its history, and a map, and this was reprinted, with only minor changes, in 2000. Large panels describing highlights of the area's historical and natural sights in English and Irish, and with maps of the central village area, stand either side of the central crossroads. In 2006 the Raheny Business Association placed blue informational plaques, with wording coordinated with the Raheny Heritage Society, on or near 15 historical buildings.

=== Raheny-on-the-Strand ===
There was, at least by the 18th century, a hamlet, a "second Raheny", Lower Raheny or Raheny-on-the-Strand, in the area of Black Bush and by the coastal point known as the "Whip of the Water" - where the Howth Road on its then route, and Fox Stream, met the sea. There was a beach road here, later washed away, then succeeded by the tram line to Howth. The current coastal road, the James Larkin Road, is a later construction.

=== Mills and quay ===
In the 18th century, Raheny had a water mill near the mouth of the Santry River, in ruins by 1757; this gave the name to the lane from the village down to the coastal road, now Watermill Road. There were also two windmills, a rare item on the map of the Dublin area. One of the latter, mapped as "Old Windmill", was situated on the Howth Road, on the slope above the Naniken River, and the other, "The Mill of Raheny", on Belmont hill, where the Capuchin friary now stands. There was also a stone wharf where the lane from the village came down to join the coastal road.

=== Crescent Cottages ===
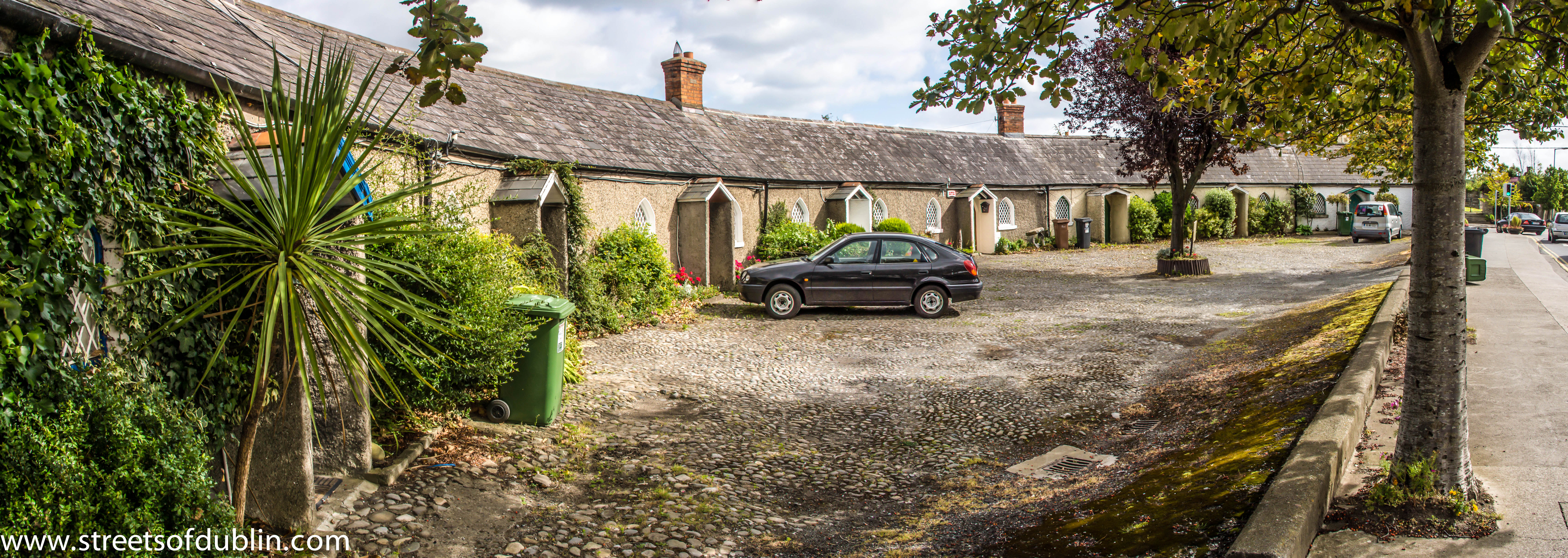
Crescent Cottages, Raheny

Eight cottages in a crescent formation on Station Road near the junction with the Howth Road are among the oldest buildings in the village, having been built around 1790 by local resident Samuel Dick, then Governor of the Bank of Ireland. The cottages served as residences for men who worked on Mr. Dick's estate. The cottages are informally known as the "Doh-Ray-Mee" cottages due to their resemblance to piano keys. The cottage nearest to the Manhattan pub was once the village post office. The cottages were willed to a trust to support what is now Springdale School, and aside from one sold, with court permission, to fund capital developments, the rent from the cottages contributes to the running of the school.

== Name ==
Several explanations exist for the origin of the name Raheny: one (from Ráth Éanna) is that it means the ringfort of Éanna, an early local chief, another (Ráth Eanaigh) is that the name derives from eanach, an old Irish word for marsh or swamp, or for a passage through a swampy area. Yet another (deriving from Rath Ain Abha) comes from "Noble Fortress of the Sea". Locally, most use Ráth Éanna while officialdom now tends towards Ráth Eanaigh. Until the mid-20th century, many local residents pronounced the English language name as something more like Rahenny or Rathenny, as it was mapped in the 18th century, or Ratheny.

Although there is a range of similar names (such as Rahanna), the name Raheny is nearly unique in Ireland, occurring in just one other locality, a portion of the rural town of Lusk. This once-significant monastic and civil centre in north County Dublin is not very remote but no connection between the two locales is known.

== Natural features ==
In addition to the Santry River (historically Skillings Glas), Raheny is also crossed by the Naniken River (previously parts of it named Ballyhoy after a Raheny townland through which it passes), the Fox Stream and the Blackbanks Stream, all monitored by Dublin City Council. The Santry and the Naniken are shown on many old maps, and one or other of the other two sometimes also appear. The Santry comes from Harristown and Dubber, north of Ballymun, and passes through eastern Santry, and Coolock, then between Harmonstown and Edenmore, to reach central Raheny and then flow on to the sea; it is in the open for most of its course. The Naniken, now culverted for more than half its length, flows from central Santry through Artane, then passes under the railway line in a syphon. Its line is marked by a disused lane from Ennafort to Howth Road, it passes under Ballyhoy Bridge (now hidden under the tarmac of the main road) and comes out of the culvert at the edge of St Anne's Park, and forms a feature through the park. From partway through the park, its course marks the boundary between Raheny and Clontarf. Both the Fox and Blackbanks Streams flow from the limestone area above Station Road (which used to hold caves and quarries), one on either side of the steep Belmont or Mount Olive hill on Station Road; both flow underground. The Fox Stream runs through Walmer lands, under Tuscany Downs, but is today smaller than historically, as some of its flow is diverted by pipe before the railway, into the already larger Blackbanks Stream. According to a chronicle of the ceremony of "Riding the Franchises", the Fox Stream is used to mark the northern boundary of Dublin City.

A major feature is the nearly five-kilometre (3.1 mi) beach known as Dollymount Strand, on the nature reserve of North Bull Island, which is shared with Clontarf. Parklands include the two largest Dublin municipal parks, North Bull Island itself and Saint Anne's Park (formerly the home of the Guinness family of brewing and later banking fame), which is also shared with Clontarf, as well as Edenmore Park (10.25 hectares, with a pitch and putt course, playground and exercise area, and playing fields), Springdale Road Park (along the Santry River) and many small green areas, such as at Rathmore Park, Maywood Lawn and within the Foxfield housing area.

There are walking and cycling lanes on the seafront (one can walk, or cycle on designated cycleways, from Howth to Dún Laoghaire), and also on North Bull Island and in St. Anne's Park. The Raheny Tidy Village Group, with the support of Dublin City Council, launched a set of three measured walking routes for the Raheny area, the Raheny Way, with a guiding noticeboard placed at Raheny DART Station, and a leaflet available at various locations around the area.

== Community organisations and media ==
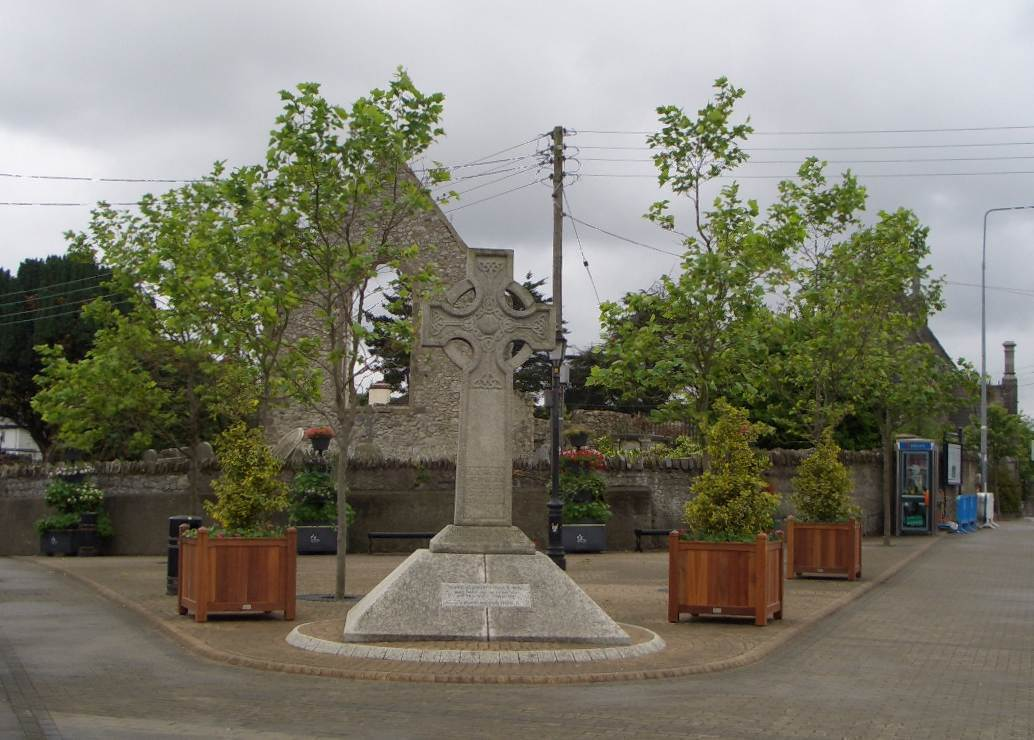
The village plaza near Raheny's centre, by Dublin City Council and the RBA

A range of residents' associations have been established over time but many have faded as housing areas have matured. One of those still functioning, the St Anne's Residents' Association (SARA), with some allied bodies, operates a community hall, CARA Hall, on All Saints' Drive, while the Grange Woodbine Association has hall facilities on Station Road. One umbrella body, the Raheny Community Council operated for a time in the 1970s, while another, the Federation of Raheny Residents (FoRR), was active from 1981 to 2011. The Federation organised a range of activities, some in conjunction with the Raheny Business Association and some with the local authority and other official bodies, including strategic plans for the village, Neighbourhood Watch arrangements, community awareness weeks, the charitable Mayor of Raheny campaigns, events for older people, the setting up of the Millennium Clock in the middle of the village, and the moving of the Marie Elizabeth Hayes Cross.

Many other voluntary groups operate in the area, some secular, such as the Raheny Heritage Society, Raheny Toastmasters, Raheny St. John Ambulance Division Raheny Order of Malta unit and Raheny Community First Responders and some church-related, such as the local conference of the Society of St. Vincent de Paul and the Mothers' Union. A special form of community organisation was the Maywood Avondale Bettyglen TV Association (MABTVA), which provided a local TV cable service for parts of Raheny (most of Dublin being served by one of two large TV cable companies), using its own receiving station, situated at the back of the old Bettyglen Estate.

The Raheny News, a local voluntary production founded in 1975, is a four-page local newsletter, known as the "green paper" due to its distinctive publication material. It is produced weekly throughout most of the year by a group of local people, with some support from the Roman Catholic parish. It was a partial successor to The Acorn, a bi-monthly magazine sponsored by the joint Killester-Raheny parish, and then by Raheny parish alone, and to The Relay, the magazine of Raheny Community Council. Roman Catholic and Church of Ireland parishes also produce bulletins. Another local paper, The Raheny Informer, was published monthly in the 2000s. From time to time, postcards of the area are published.

Raheny is part of the service area of the community radio station NEAR FM.

=== Business community ===
A number of local businesses, and some civic entities, are members of the Raheny Business Association (RBA), a form of chamber of commerce.

=== Environment and Tidy Towns ===
Raheny's voluntary Tidy Village Group drives activities for the Tidy Towns competition, and has helped the area win a number of civic awards. In 2006, the Raheny Business Association began to sponsor a part-time paid coordinator to help the group in its work. Raheny received a Highly Commended rating in the 2008 Tidy Towns competition, and the detailed report noted potential, with some further organisation, to win the competition outright. The following year, 2009, Raheny won the Best Urban Village award and was one of four areas of Dublin City to receive a commendation in the overall Tidy Towns competition. In 2014 Raheny again won the Best Urban Village award in the Tidy Towns competition. Raheny won the bronze medal in its category in the National Tidy Towns Competition every year from 2015 to 2019; the Tidy Towns contest was not held in 2020 due to the Covid-19 pandemic.

The Raheny Way is a project developed by the Raheny Tidy Village group aimed at developing walking routes within the Raheny area. Routes identified take the walker past many historical and environmental attractions in the area. The Tidy Village group also runs community events such as Tallest Sunflower Competition and beach cleans.

== Amenities and business ==
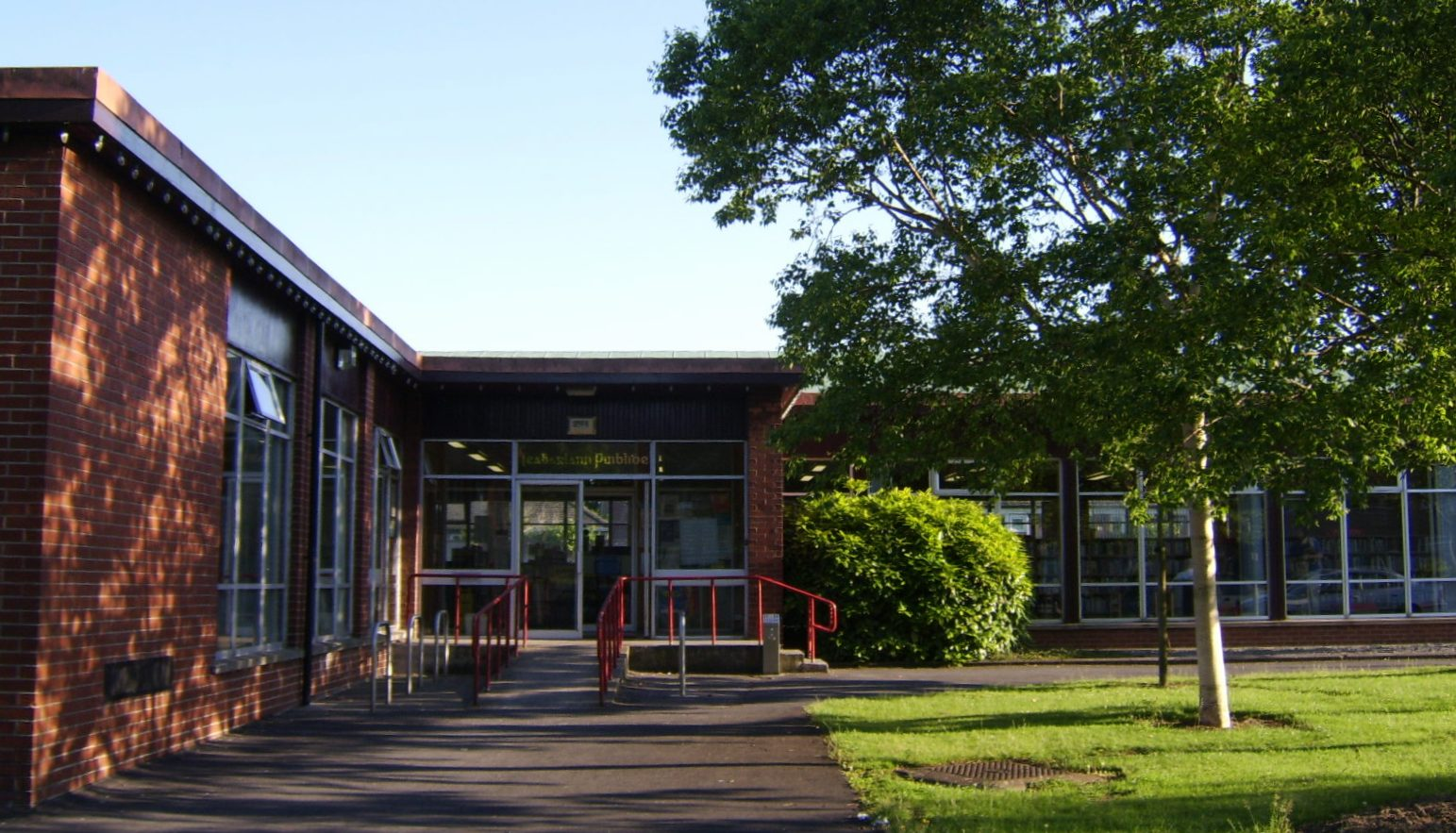
Raheny Library

Raheny's library was opened in 1972 and is Dublin's second busiest municipal branch library. Located near the village centre it has a reading garden and recycling centre. Adjacent to the library is the site of the first Catholic School in the village, built by William Sweetman circa 1820, now a solicitor's office. The district also holds St. Francis Hospice and St. Joseph's Hospital (administered by Beaumont Hospital Board), as well as a small local health centre, a Credit Union branch (the local credit union merged with those of Artane and Coolock), a Garda Síochána station, located opposite the national school complex on All Saints' Drive, and one of Dublin's three driving test centres, at the St. Anne's shopping plaza. Local amenities include several shops and small shopping areas. There are several financial institutions, a fitness club and several doctors, dentists and specific and alternative health providers. The area's swimming pool, separate from but adjacent to St. Paul's College, closed to the public in 2006 after about 30 years of private operation, and was later replaced by an apartment block development.

The main local shopping facility is located in the centre of the village, on Howth Road beside the Santry River. The anchor unit is a SuperValu store. Across Howth Road from the shopping centre proper, are several other retail units and service outlets. Dublin Bus routes H1, H2 and H3 serve the shopping centre's 'Raheny Village' stop. Parts of the areas are also served by the Tesco-anchored Kilbarrack Shopping Centre and another in coastal Kilbarrack and Edenmore Shopping Centre, and the nearest large supermarkets are in Donaghmede and at Clare Hall. There are two service stations, one at each end of the area, and there are several motor dealers and vehicle repair locations.

=== Hospitality ===
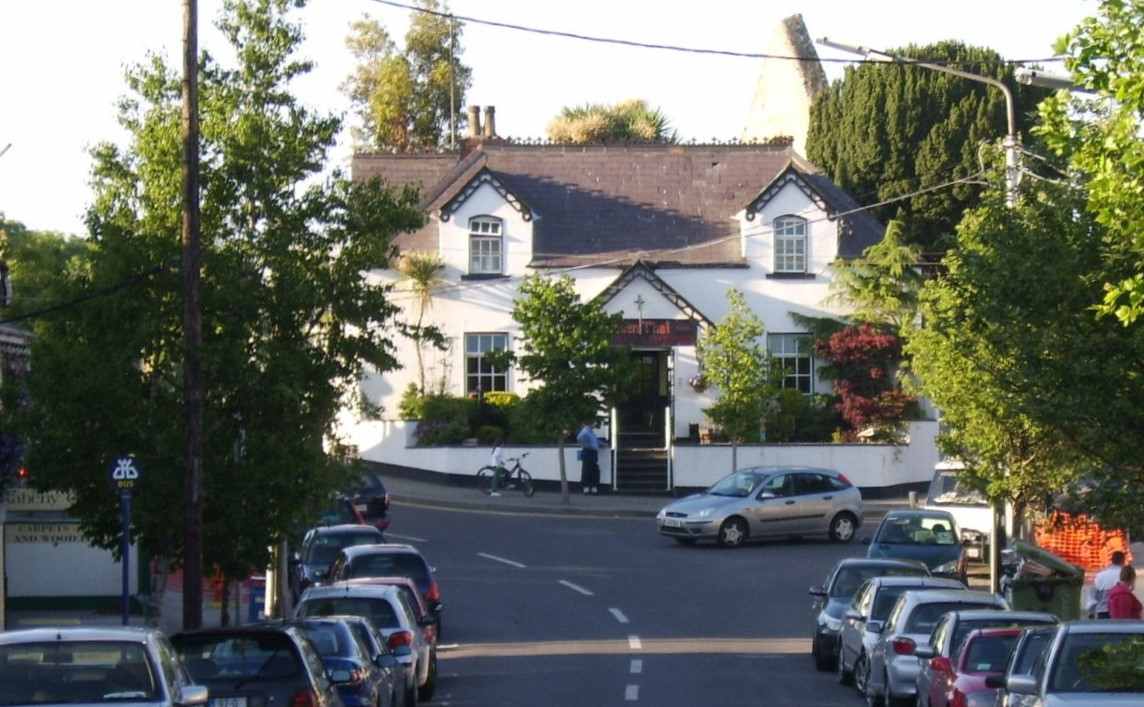
Main Street, Raheny, with old schoolhouse turned restaurant

In addition to a number of bed-and-breakfasts and guest houses, there are several pubs in the area. Eating places include three restaurants, one of the three old schoolhouses in the village centre, at the top of Main Street, one on Watermill Road, in the former Raheny Hardware building, and one in St Assam's, as well as a coffee shop with dinner service, under the main shopping centre.

== Religious institutions ==
Raheny has four church buildings in the village core, active Roman Catholic and Church of Ireland (Anglican) churches, one closed Catholic church, and one ruin. The Catholic church overlooks the centre of the village (with feature belfry and baptistry), while the Church of Ireland building is sited on the approach to the village centre from the city.

The central Roman Catholic church building is the Church of Our Lady Mother of Divine Grace, of the Catholic Parish of Raheny. The building, completed in 1962, was designed by Peppard and Duffy architects, at the behest of Monsignor William Fitzpatrick and Archbishop John Charles McQuaid, with a capacity of 1500 to accommodate a burgeoning local congregation. The church opened on Sunday, 22 July 1962. The main entrance is framed within a large triangle inset with numerous smaller triangles, recalling traditional motifs from Romanesque Irish churches. The facade and the bell tower are built with green limestone.

Our Lady's substantially smaller predecessor, St. Assam's Church, built between 1859 and 1864, is directly opposite. Regular worship ceased there when Our Lady's opened, and it was lightly used for the succeeding three decades, hosting St Joseph's Youth Club (Bru Sheosamh), Taize prayer services, and some meetings and occasional Masses. The building is a Protected Structure. It was later sold, and a conversion to office space was planned.

The district is also served by the pyramid-style church of Kilbarrack-Foxfield Parish, by St. Benedict's, of Grange Park Parish, and by St. Brigid's, of Killester Parish, and by the chapel at the Capuchin Friary. A number of other Roman Catholic religious orders also have local presences. Prior to the restoration of local worship, Rahenyites had for centuries to attend Mass in Coolock or, later, Clontarf, or in local houses.

The Church of Ireland church, for the Anglican Parish of Raheny, (now in Union with the Parish of Coolock), All Saints Church, was built at the expense of Arthur Guinness, Baron Ardilaun of the Guinness family. Before this church was built, Raheny Parish was served by the older church in the centre of Raheny, an earlier St. Assam's Church, dating back to 1712, and previously to 1609 and before. All Saints' has a Rectory in the grounds, as well as a community hall and a preserved gate lodge for the verger. In April 2010, it was announced that the church required extensive roof repairs and funds were raised to complete this.

There was for some time also a large Plymouth Brethren meeting hall in "new" Bettyglen. Methodist worshippers have churches in Clontarf and Sutton, and Presbyterian churches are in Clontarf and Howth.

== Education ==
The district has a boys' secondary school, St. Paul's College, Raheny (attended by approximately 600 pupils in 2006) and one of Ireland's largest girls' secondary schools, Manor House, as well as Ardscoil La Salle, on Raheny Road, a smaller mixed second level facility.

There is a primary school complex just behind the village centre, with a mixed junior school, Scoil Ide, and distinct boys' and girls' senior schools, Scoil Assaim and Scoil Aine respectively, as well as a shared assembly hall, used for many community events. There is also a mixed primary school, Springdale National School, on Springdale Road, overseen by a Board of Governors, with an endowment which includes rent from seven of the area's historic cottages at the Crescent. There is a special national school operated by St. Michael's House on Raheny Road, and another general primary school in the Grange Park locality.

The locality of Edenmore has its own school facilities, with a junior girls' school (St Monica's), and separate senior primary schools for boys (St Malachy's) and girls (St Eithne's).

== Sport ==
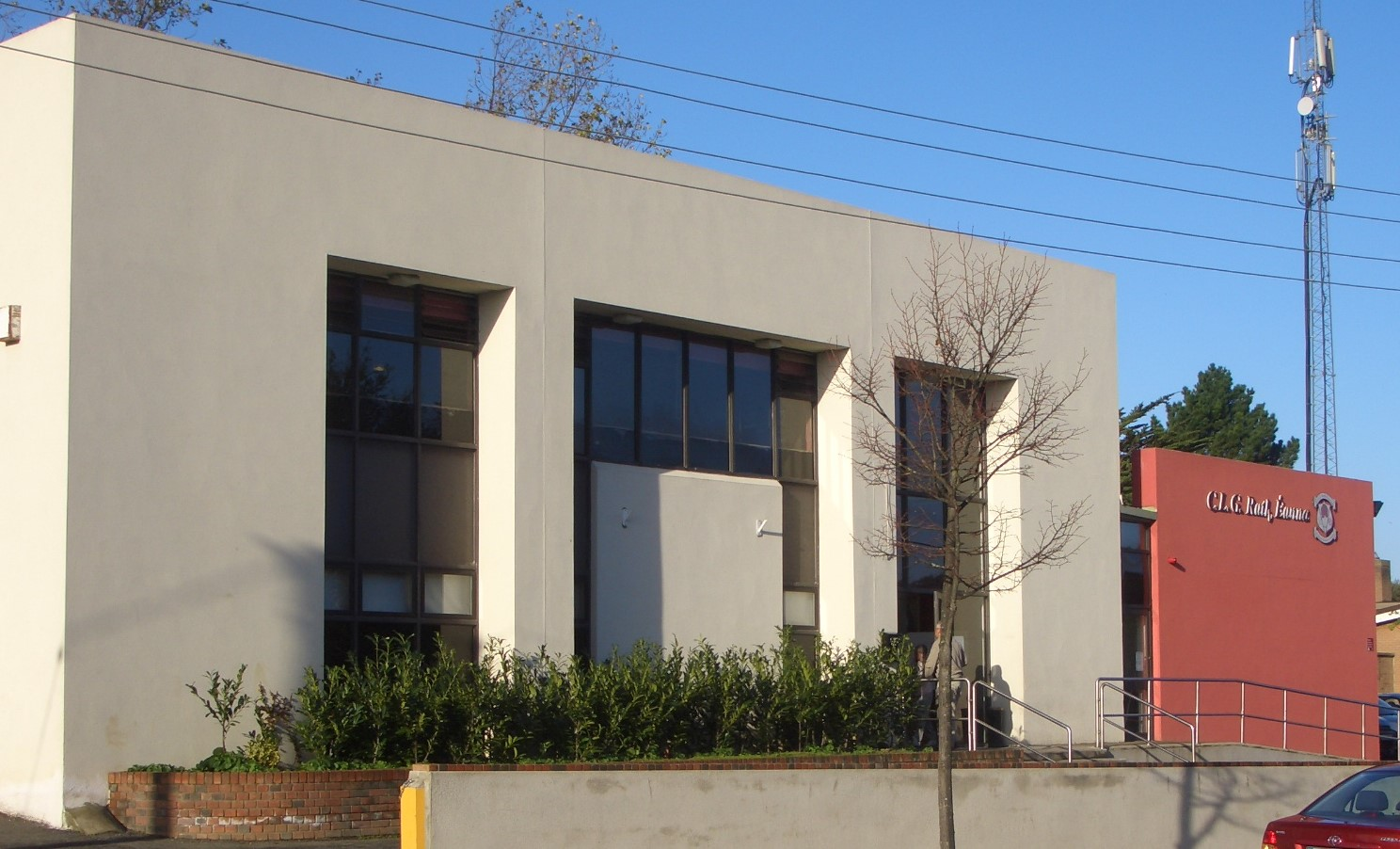
Raheny GAA's clubhouse, with cafe and practice yard

=== GAA ===
Raheny GAA, founded in the late 1950s, has a large clubhouse on All Saints Drive. St Vincents GAA was based north of the village centre, but has since moved to Marino

=== Athletics ===
Raheny Shamrock Athletic Club operates from a converted old schoolhouse behind the Scout Den on the slopes of the old fortification which gives its name to Raheny. The Shamrocks manage the annual AXA Raheny Five Mile Road Race, and 30 other events. The club became the largest athletics club in Dublin and have provided four Olympians. There is also a regular "parkrun" in St Anne's Park.

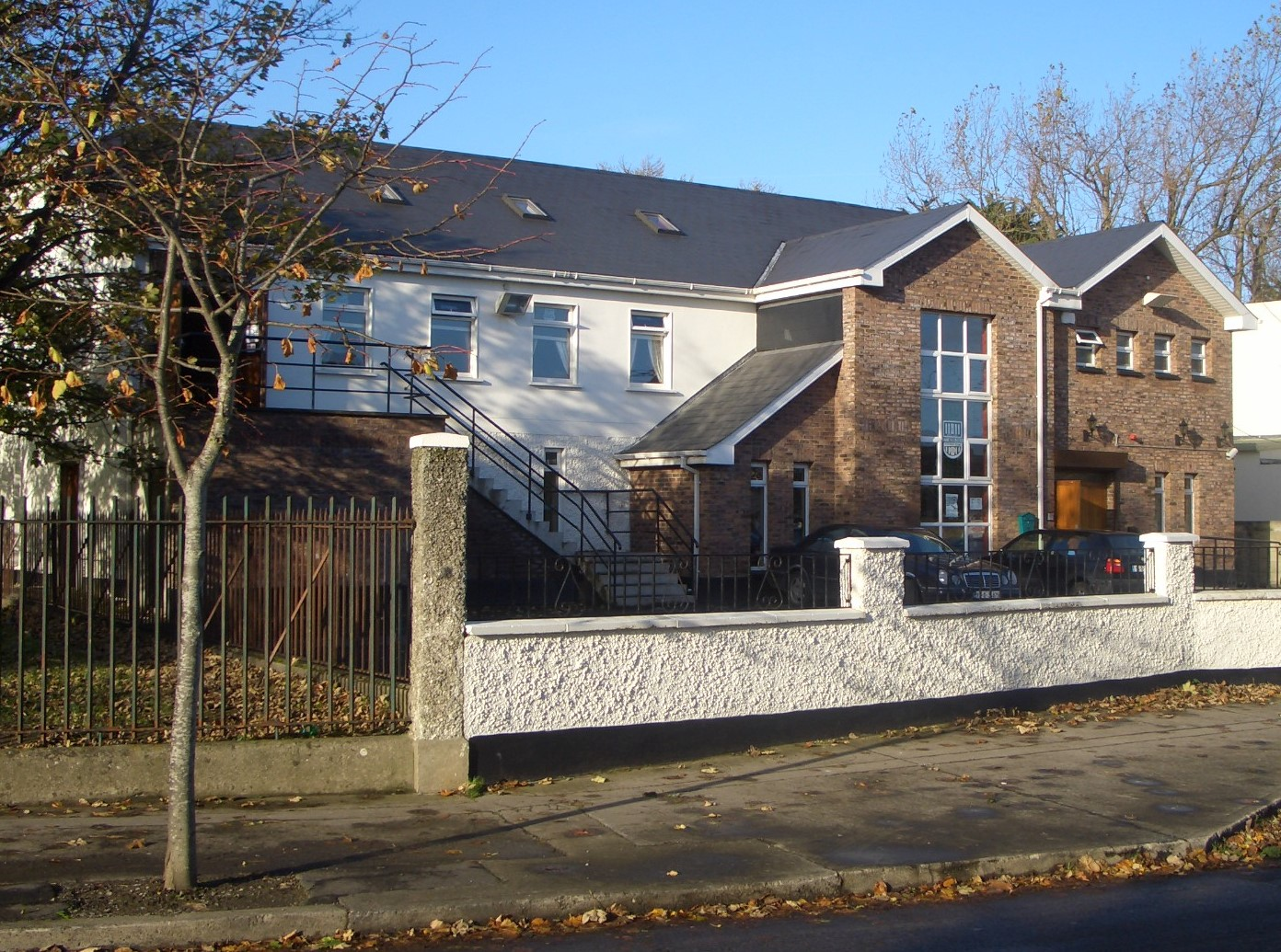
Raheny United's clubhouse

=== Soccer (association football) ===
Raheny United F.C. was formed from the union of two local clubs, Raheny Boys F.C. and Dunseedy United F.C. The senior men's team plays in Athletic Union League, while the senior women's team were founder members of the Women's National League and have also played in the Dublin Women's Soccer League Grange Woodbine F.C. was founded in 1973 and its teams play their home matches at Edenmore Park and Woodbine Road Belgrove F.C. play their home matches at St. Paul's College, Raheny.

=== Golf and related sports ===
St. Anne's Golf Club, founded by a small group of locals in 1921, is based at the Raheny end of Bull Island, while the Royal Dublin Golf Club is also on Bull Island, primarily in Clontarf but partly, and with its service entrance, in Raheny. There is also a public par-3 golf course in St Anne's Park, and municipal Pitch and Putt facility within Edenmore Park, on Station Road.

=== Racquet sports ===
St Anne's Park Tennis Club plays at the public tennis courts at St Anne's Park. There are also two badminton clubs, Raheny Badminton Club and Raheny Smashers, both playing at the badminton facility in Baldoyle.

== Youth groups ==
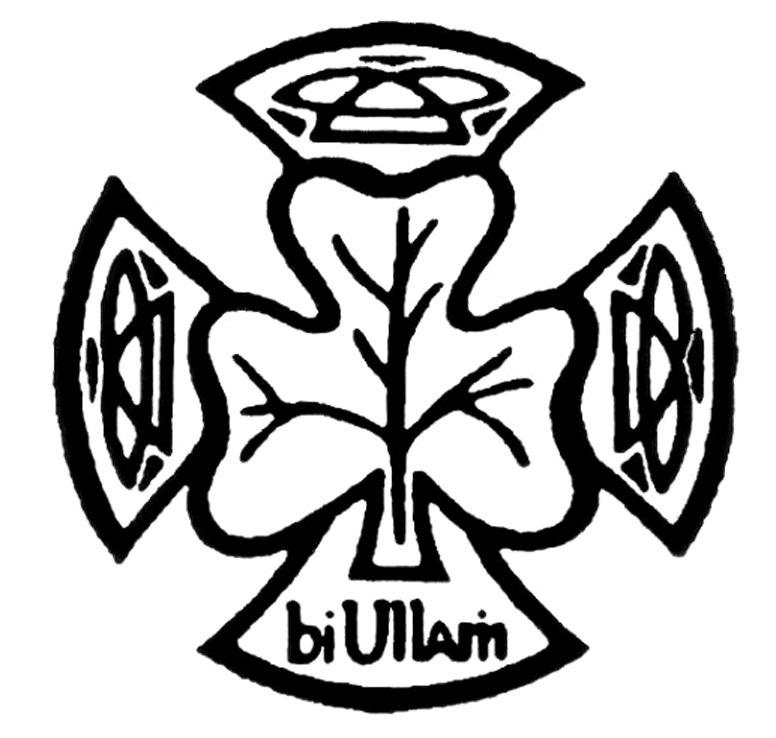
CGI Guide Promise Badge

The 73rd Raheny Scout Group, a unit of Scouting Ireland, meet at their den on the banks of the Santry River, opposite the Church of Our Lady Mother of Divine Grace on the Howth Road. Raheny Guides, also known as Buion An Leanbh Prague of the Catholic Guides of Ireland, have been in existence since 1966, meeting on a Wednesday evening. The Cygnets (age 5–7) meet in the CARA Hall and the Brigins (age 6–10), Guides (age 10–16) and Rangers (age 14–19) meet in Scoil Aine (Raheny N.S.) Hall. There are also Girls' and Boys' Brigade companies meeting at the Church of Ireland halls.

Previously the area had a youth club for the eastern end of the village, M.A.F.R.A., and later St Joseph's Youth Club, based at the new St Assam's Church, and supported by the Roman Catholic parish.

== Politics ==
In Dáil Éireann, Raheny is part of the five-seat Dublin Bay North constituency. Until the 2016 general election it was split between the constituencies of Dublin North-Central and Dublin North-East. The splitting of the district, which also gives electoral stations on either side of the village centre (generally at the library and at the National Schools complex), was a source of local anger for many years.

Long-serving politicians for the area include Seán Kenny (politician), a Dublin City Councillor from 1979 until 2011 when he was elected for the second time in Dáil Éireann (the first occasion having been in the 1990s) and former minister Michael Woods, who lives in neighbouring Kilbarrack. Past figures include the late ex-Taoiseach Charles Haughey, and Councillor Niamh Cosgrave, of Foxfield, the latter in a rare move having been removed from the City Council for non-attendance.

== Localities and housing ==
The civil parish of Raheny comprises at least the townlands of Ballyhoy, Bettyville, Charleville, Edenmore, Foxlands, Glebe, Maryville, Mountolive (or Mount of Olives), North Bull Island, Raheny North, Raheny South and (the) Snug. Some historical records also note the village centre as a distinct entity, "Raheny Town". Foxlands now contains Avondale, Maywood and Bettyglen, while Mountolive (and parts of Swan's Nest) now include several roads and estates, notably "Tuscany Downs" whose naming caused ministerial comment and public discussion about inappropriate naming conventions. The modern civic district is sometimes seen as extending beyond these areas, and at one time Raheny was used as the address for much of what is now Donaghmede, for example. The civil parish is still maintained in law, and its boundaries were last reviewed in 1985, with their extension to a greater part of Dublin Bay; it includes half, or slightly more, of Bull Island.

The first major housing development in Raheny was St Anne's, built for Dublin Corporation on parts of the former Guinness estate not retained as a public park, which was followed by Cill Éanna and Ennafort, then Avondale, Rathmore Park, St Assam's and Foxfield, and Maywood were developed by the building firm of Curtis & Farrelly in the early to mid-1960s. Grange Park, Millwood and Grange-Woodbine, and "Old" Bettyglen followed, and later Ashcroft on the former St Vincent's grounds, "New Bettyglen" in the 1980s, Belmont and Tuscany Downs. There are a number of housing units for older people, notably in St. Anne's and at Avondale, and three retirement/nursing homes, one formerly dedicated for retired members of the Garda Siochana and their families, one run by the Little Sisters of the Poor at Sybil Hill, and one HSE facility. The Sorohan Brothers built a range of houses from 1966.

Starting in the mid-2000s, Raheny, most of which was laid out with semi-detached and terraced houses with good gardens front and rear, has seen some infill development, especially on corner sites, and the arrival of a small but growing number of apartment developments (the area previously had almost no apartment buildings).

=== Localities ===
All of one and part of another of Raheny's townlands were largely developed by Dublin Corporation to form a new neighbourhood, Edenmore, in one of its largest-ever housing projects. Although still part of the overall district, and shown in addresses as Edenmore, Raheny, the new area, with its own schools, small shopping centre (including one of Dublin's highest-turnover pubs), church (Roman Catholic: St. Monica's), health centre and some sports teams, has a distinct identity. There is also a nursing home, St Gabriel's.

The locality of Harmonstown, straddling the boundary between Raheny and Artane, lies just over the railway line from the Ennafort housing development in Raheny, and across the Santry River from Edenmore.

== People ==
Born in Raheny

- Holly Carpenter, Miss Ireland 2011
- Elaine Cassidy, actress
- Graham Dale, US Marine and writer
- Simon Delaney, actor and director
- Brian Fenton, multiple All-Ireland-winning Gaelic Footballer and All-Star
- Richard Maxwell Fox, Repeal Association politician
- Jackie Gilroy, All-Ireland-winning Gaelic footballer
- Paddy Gogarty, All-Ireland-winning Gaelic footballer
- Arthur Guinness, Baron Ardilaun, businessman, politician and philanthropist
- David Healy, psychiatrist and professor
- David Henry All-Ireland-winning Gaelic Footballer & former captain of Dublin Gaelic football team
- Ali Hewson, activist and entrepreneur
- David Hickey, All-Ireland winning Gaelic Footballer
- Dick Hooper three-time Olympian & four time European Championship athlete
- Pat Hooper, marathoner, Olympic athlete, long-distance runner, Dublin City Marathon champion
- Brian Howard, All-Ireland-winning Gaelic footballer
- Ray Kennedy, RTÉ journalist & newscaster.
- Martin King (Boyle), weather presenter
- Alan Larkin, All-Ireland winning Gaelic Footballer
- Richard Maunsell, railway engineer
- The Nolans, an early "girl band", especially popular in the UK and Japan (including Linda Nolan and Bernie Nolan, singers, actors, authors)
- Ciarán Whelan, former captain of the Dublin Gaelic football team and twice GAA All-Star

Resident

- Norman Baillie-Stewart, British Army officer and Nazi sympathiser
- Jane Barlow, novelist
- Jon Berkeley, children's novelist and illustrator
- Sara Berkeley, poet
- A.J. Cronin, novelist
- Joe Doyle, cyclist and cycle sport administrator
- Arthur Fields, street photographer
- Bernadette Greevy (3 July 1940 – 26 September 2008), mezzo-soprano, founder and artistic director of the Anna Livia Dublin International Opera Festival, first artist-in-residence at the Dublin Institute of Technology
- Charles Haughey, politician, lived in 490 Howth Road for a period, ran for office a number of times while living in Raheny, failing at by-election and in the 1954 general election, but succeeding in the General Election of 1957; later moved to the Grange area of Baldoyle (later Donaghmede), and then to Kinsealy
- Sean Haughey, politician, Lord Mayor of Dublin, TD, Minister
- Kevin Heffernan, Gaelic footballer and manager
- Tom Humphries, sports commentator
- Seán Kenny, politician
- Seosamh Mac Grianna, Irish author. In 2023, a plaque was unveiled by Dublin City Council at the site of his former home in Saint Anne's Park.
- Brendan Mullin, former Ireland international Rugby Union player
- Seán Óg Ó Ceallacháin, broadcaster, journalist, author
- Dáithí Ó Conaill, a founding member of the Provisional IRA and later the Continuity IRA

Went to school in Raheny

- Moya Doherty, producer, co-founder of Riverdance
- Roddy Doyle, novelist and playwright
- Eileen Dunne, newscaster and radio presenter RTÉ
- Neil Jordan, film director
- Áine Lawlor, broadcaster
- Andrea Nolan, professor, Vice-Chancellor of Edinburgh Napier University
- Aileen O'Toole, journalist and editor
- Kathy Prendergast, sculptor and painter
- Gerry Ryan, DJ and presenter

Otherwise connected

- Bono of U2 went to church in Raheny, and he and Ali Hewson were married in All Saints' Church

== See also ==
- List of towns and villages in Ireland

== Sources ==
- www.raheny.com (as at 10 March and 17 April 2006, and since)
- Dublin: The Acorn (journal), Roman Catholic Parish of Killester and Raheny
- Raheny Branch, Dublin Public Libraries: Local History File
- Raheny, Dublin, 1990: Through countless ages: The story of the church and parish of All Saints, and the district of Raheny; Arthur Garrett
- Raheny, Dublin, 1992 and 2000: Raheny Heritage Trail, Raheny Heritage Society
- Raheny, Dublin: Census Returns of Raheny and Environs, Raheny Heritage Society
- Dublin, Cahill, 1922: Authentic Derivations of Place-Names in County Dublin Traced and Explained With the Aid of Real Evidence; MacNamara, M. A
- Dublin, Ordnance Survey of Ireland: 2005, Map of Dublin District
