= St. Francis Hospice, Raheny =

Hospice in Dublin, Ireland

St. Francis Hospice, Raheny, Dublin (operating under the care of the Daughters of Charity) is a specialist palliative care service, including an in-patient unit, and home care and specialist out patient and day services. The Hospice, one of two main hospice organisations in Dublin, provides care in a region with a population of c. 500,000 people.

== History / Service Development ==
St. Francis Hospice began when the Irish Hospice Foundation approached the Daughters of Charity (of St. Vincent de Paul) in 1988, seeking help to establish a home care service for northern Dublin. Supported by many individuals and organisations, the service developed over following years.

The service began with a Home Care initiative from 1989, originally based in a temporary building in the grounds of the Capuchin Friary on Station Road, Raheny, providing specialist advisory and support services to patients and their families in their own home. This service continues.

The Capuchins later donated their friary garden for the building of a permanent Hospice, allowing construction to start in 1993 - delivering an office and meeting space for the Home Care team and a purpose-built Hospice Day Care Centre. The Day Care service commenced that year.

St. Anne's In-Patient Unit, a 19-bed facility, opened on a phased basis between 1995 and 1997, allowing patients to be admitted for respite care and symptom control, and when there is a need for specialist care and support in the terminal phase of their illness.

In the next stage of development, the adjoining "big house", Walmer House, was purchased, and then further building was completed, leading to the opening in 2002 of a new Hospice Day Care, Bereavement Counselling facility and Centre for Continuing Studies.

== Planned service for Dublin North West ==
The Hospice has been looking since 2003 for a new site in the western part of its catchment area, to facilitate a second base for its Home Care Team, and another Hospice Day Care facility (in the same way as Our Lady's Hospice, Harolds Cross, founded Blackrock Hospice).

== Access ==
The Hospice receives referrals for people with cancer or motor neurone disease and all services are available at no cost to residents of North Dublin City and County regardless of their financial, social or religious status.

Bereavement support is offered and is available to relatives and friends; social work staff are also available to work with bereaved children.

== Funding ==
Partial funding for the service comes from various sources, including the Health Service Executive and its predecessor organisations, the Irish Hospice Foundation, the Irish Cancer Society and local support groups - and the Hospice notes that it depends to a large extent on charitable contributions.

== RTÉ ==
In early 2007, the national TV broadcaster, RTÉ, screened a multi-week documentary about the work of the Hospice, and its clients, with individual stories.
