= Raheny parish (Church of Ireland) =

Church of Ireland parish, Dublin, Ireland

The Parish of Raheny is the modern successor in the Church of Ireland to an early (1152) parish, in Raheny, a district of Dublin reputed to be a site of Christian settlement back to 570. Today's parish comprises Raheny village and the wider district, and is in a Union with the Parish of Coolock. Its parish church is All Saints' Church, Raheny.

The other successor to the ancient parish is the Roman Catholic parish, whose boundaries have shifted somewhat from the historic ones.

== History ==
=== Early history ===
The Celtic Church was primarily based around monastic settlements, and it is a local tradition that the area's patron saint, St. Assam, possibly a disciple of St. Patrick, established a church here.

Around the start of the second millennium, part of the area was subject to the monastery, linked to St. Nessan, on Ireland's Eye, and around 1039, territories thought to be Portrane, Baldoyle and Raheny were in the possession of the Danish King of Dublin, Sigtrygg Silkbeard, who granted farmland in the area to Christ Church Cathedral, newly established under the first Bishop of Dublin, Donat.

In the 12th century, the Irish Church moved towards a parochial model, in which Raheny was within the Diocese of Glendalough. Following restructuring under figures such as St. Malachy, Archbishop of Armagh, and the Papal Legate Cardinal Paparo in 1152, thirty-eight dioceses, each comprising a number of parishes, were approved. The Diocese of Dublin, previously a small "island" in the walled city, in the middle of the vast Diocese of Glendalough, was raised to the status of Archdiocese, with forty parishes, one of which was Raheny, in the Deanery of Fingal. The boundaries of this ancient parish are probably best reflected today in those of the Civil Parish, and of the Church of Ireland parish of the same name.

Shortly after formation, the Anglo-Norman invasion impacted the whole Dublin region, and Raheny changed hands more than once in the following years, though it is not always clear what effect such changes had on the Church locally. In 1171, a Dane called Gill Mololmoa (Gilcolm) was a landholder in the area, and around this time, part of Raheny (Rathenny) was taken from Gilcolm and granted by Strongbow to the Norman knight John deCourcey, a descendant of whose, of the same name, was "Lord of Rathenny and Kilbarrock" at the beginning of the 13th century. By 1225, much of Raheny still belonged to Christ Church, but some appears to have been in the hands of St. Mary's Abbey, who acquired Christ Church's part in a swap; these holdings are confirmed in a Papal Bull (Pope Clement III) of 1189, and a renewed grant by King John, which specifically mentions a church building. There are further references in abbey records of 1296 and 1310, and the church, along with those of Grange (Baldoyle) and Coolock, is mentioned in a will of 1472.

The only clergyman mentioned for the period up to 1615 was one Thomas, a rector appointed by the Crown, who was in office in 1226.

=== From the dissolution of the monasteries to the early 19th century ===
Following the break between Henry VIII and the Papacy, the Anglican Churches came into being and sometime between this point and the early years of the reign of Elizabeth I (see Elizabethan Settlement), there emerged two Parishes of Raheny, one in the Roman Catholic Church, one in the Church of Ireland. There is no record of the original church during this time, and as happened in many parishes, it may have been allowed to fall into ruin, while the Roman Catholic parish became part of a Union Parish in 1614. The Parish of Raheny was one of a relatively small number of parishes in the Diocese of Dublin for whom powers of appointment were reserved to the Crown.

The old church site saw the building of a new church in 1609, the remains of whose 1712 successor can still be seen today; see the St. Assam's Church article for more on the building.

The records of the Royal Visitation of 1615 (carried out by the Archbishop of Dublin) note that John Credlan was at that time Rector of Coolock Parish and Curate at Rathenny, with Raheny being in the care of the laity, the tithes going to one Thomas Wingfield. The next recorded priest for the area was Thomas Seele, Vicar of Coolock and Curate at Raheny in 1641, and later (1669–1675) Provost of Trinity College Dublin.

In 1669, Henry Brereton was placed in charge of Raheny and Clontarf parishes. Patrick Grattan, who bought Belcamp Park as his residence, was appointed Rector of Raheny in 1680, and was succeeded in 1703 by his son, John. John Grattan moved to another appointment in 1720, after overseeing the rebuilding of St. Assam's Church in 1712, with some Government money granted.

From 1720 to 1731, the Rector was Richard Gibbons, who then moved to St. Mark's Parish, being succeeded by Marmaduke Phillips, later briefly Bishop of Waterford. The Rector from 1735 to 1774 was Ralph Cocking, also Chancellor of Ossory in his later years, and followed by William Shaw (1774–1796) and George Stevenson (1796–1802), who was also Vicar of Callan from 1796. During the periods of office of Shaw and Stevenson, there appear to have been assisting ministers or curates, a Mr. Grange and one Eugene McKenna, as well as a definite curatorial appointment, Thomas Seele, from 1789. Also during Stevenson's time, a Governor of the Bank of Ireland, Mr. Samuel Dick, purchased Violet Hill, the "big house" later named Edenmore, moving in in 1787. In the same year, Mr. Dick built a Parish School, adjacent to the churchyard, and when he died, he left the cottages of "The Crescent" to provide income for the school's maintenance.

=== Into the 19th century ===
In 1802, Latham Coddington became Rector, who ordered a new Rectory, completed in 1810, a year after the arrival of the new Rector, Richard Graves. Graves, Deputy Professor of Divinity at TCD, proposed a re-roofing of the church, and the building of a tower, but the proposal did not proceed.

In 1814, Francis Fox became Rector, followed by George Gore in 1821. Rev. Gore had financial difficulties, and a Sequestrator was appointed to the Parish to oversee its assets, but some work was completed on the church building. In 1823, a curate from Bonnybrook in Coolock, Duncan Long, was provided, and a new Rector, Eric Davis, arrived in 1827, dying in office in 1838.

Josiah Crampton, a noted amateur astronomer, took over as Rector in 1838, and in 1839, Sir Benjamin Lee Guinness proposed the building of a new parish church, at a new site, but although the idea was approved by the Easter Vestry, it did not succeed.

Crampton was followed, in 1855, by William F. Black. Rev. Black filed a complaint, within a week of appointment, that his predecessor had not taken proper care of the Rectory and allied properties, and it was determined that work was required, some to be paid for by Rev. Crampton, and some from the parish's assets.

In 1864, William R. Burton became the last Rector of Raheny to be appointed by Crown authority, and he oversaw significant renovation work on the old church, including replacement of most fittings, such as the pulpit and pews.

=== Disestablishment and the Guinnesses ===
Under the Irish Church Act 1869, taking effect on 1 January 1871, the Church of Ireland ceased to be a State Church, and much of its property, aside from actual religious buildings (so, for example, rectories and their lands), passed to the State. In the case of Raheny Parish, this meant that an income flow of around 400 Irish pounds dropped to one of around 40, not really enough to support a rector, never mind to replace or buy the former rectory. In addition, Raheny's Church of Ireland population was falling, and active parishioners becoming scarcer, with perhaps 8 or 9 at General Vestry meetings. As a further effect of reorganisation following disestablishment, the system by which clergy were nominated by the Crown or various private or Church bodies ceased, and a Board of Nomination had to be created in each parish.

The Rev. Burton indicated his wish to resign and retire from ministry in 1872 and in December of that year, Sir Arthur E. Guinness made a proposal to Raheny's Select Vestry, under which he would fund Rev. Burton's retirement, saving over 1000 pounds for the parish, and would provide money towards buying the rectory and over 5 acres (20,000 m^{2}) around it, in return for the transfer of the right to nominate the Rector to himself and his heirs. This proposal was accepted, becoming fully effective in January 1873, when Guinness became a Vestryman.

Guinness nominated Francis Hayes as Rector, and he held office from 1873 to 1918. Hayes was the grandson of the founder of the Temperance Society (Poolbeg St.) and the Band of Hope, and moved to Raheny from Suffolk Street, where he had been curate. In 1874, the Rectory and over 5 acres (20,000 m^{2}) were purchased from the Government, with funding mostly from Sir Arthur Guinness and John Maunsell.

=== All Saints Church and the early 20th century ===
In 1881, Lord Ardilaun (as Sir Arthur Guinness became in 1880) made a proposal to construct a new church, on a site he would provide at the village end of his St. Anne's Estate, and this was agreed by the parish in 1885. Construction commenced shortly thereafter, and the new All Saints Church was completed around October 1889. The Service of Dedication of the church took place on 16 December 1889 but full consecration could not take place, as the freehold of the land was not available, being held by the Howth Estate. Lord Ardilaun committed to maintaining the building at his expense on two conditions, firstly that the rites of the church be standard, and second that both the new and old churches be well-maintained.

Meanwhile, in 1887, the Rector's wife, Annabella Jane Hayes, founded the first branch of the Mothers' Union in Ireland, at Raheny.

In 1918, Canon Hayes retired, and Lady Ardilaun appointed Thomas W. E. Drury as the new Rector. During Drury's time in office, a new organ was provided in All Saints, while the old church was partly dismantled, the interior fittings having been sold. In 1921, women were elected to Raheny's Select Vestry for the first time (five out of sixteen seats), and in 1924, Rev. Drury was appointed Treasurer of St. Patrick's Cathedral.

In 1926, a one-ton bell was provided in memory of Lady Ardilaun by her nephew and principal heir, Bishop Plunket; Lady Ardilaun passed the right of presentation to the retired bishop in her will but with the stipulation that no Englishman be nominated. In 1938, the Bishop began steps to transfer the church to the Representative Church Body on behalf of the parish. In the absence of the freehold of the land, full consecration as a parish church was still not possible. Bishop Plunket also transferred the right of presentation of the Rector to the Parish, with a regular Board of Nomination, and parochial nominators were elected in 1939. On All Saints' Day, 1939, the church's fiftieth anniversary was celebrated.

In 1945, an additional acre of ground near the church was purchased from Dublin Corporation and in 1949, the old Rectory and its 8 acres (32,000 m^{2}) of land were sold to Jack Belton, newly elected Lord Mayor of Dublin, and on 15 December, the Rector retired.

== From 1950, and Union with Coolock ==
In February 1950, Canon T.J. Johnston became Rector, and the new Rectory was dedicated on All Saints' Day.

The Parishes of Raheny and Coolock shared in outings, Sunday School activities, the parish magazine and the World War I memorial in the years prior to 1920, and the Union of the parishes was first proposed in 1920. In the event, Coolock was instead placed in Union with the Parishes of Glasnevin and Santry but was eventually united with Raheny in 1960.

Canon Johnston was appointed in charge of both parishes in March 1960, and the union was completed when he became Rector of Coolock in July of that year. From then on, there was to be a rector in Raheny, a curate in Coolock (the first was appointed in 1963), two churches, and a shared school (now Springdale National School, Raheny). For over twenty years, the Select Vestries of the parishes were also united, but this ended in 1981.

In March 1969, the new Parochial Hall was dedicated as "Johnston Hall", and about the same time, the freehold of the land at All Saints was finally purchased from the Howth Estate, and the Rector retired due to ill health.

The next rector of the United Parishes was Wilbert Kelly, instituted in June 1970, and when he went on mission service in 1975, Cecil Wilson was appointed.

In April 1976, the old church and churchyard were taken into care by Dublin Corporation, and in September 1981, a fire destroyed the old "Plunket Hall". A new "All Saints' Hall" was dedicated in 1983, merged with the Johnston Hall. In June 1984, items of church plate were stolen, two being from St. Assam's Church in 1734, and one being an even older piece (1705) presented by Lady Ardilaun.

In 1989, All Saints Church celebrated its centenary, and the Select Vestry published a history of the parish and district.

== The Parish of Raheny today ==
The current rector is Norman MacCausland, who succeeded James "Jim" Carroll in 2013. The parish hosts regular services and events such as the annual Strawberry Fair in its grounds, which hold the church, rectory, parish hall and a lodge. There are also a number of voluntary groups linked to the parish, including the Girl Guides and Brownies.

The Church has a cordial relationship with the neighbouring Roman Catholic parish, and the two have cooperated on such events as Parish Pilgrimages and Women's World Day of Prayer.

== Sources ==
- Local History File, Raheny Public Library
- Dublin: Catholic Truth Society, 1915; Donnelly, N. (Canea, Bishop of); Short Histories of Dublin Parishes, Vol. XIV.
- Dublin: rahenyparish.org (History), recorded on 14 April 2005.
