= St. Assam's Church =

Historic churches in Raheny, Dublin, Ireland

Coordinates: 53.38018°N 6.17492°W

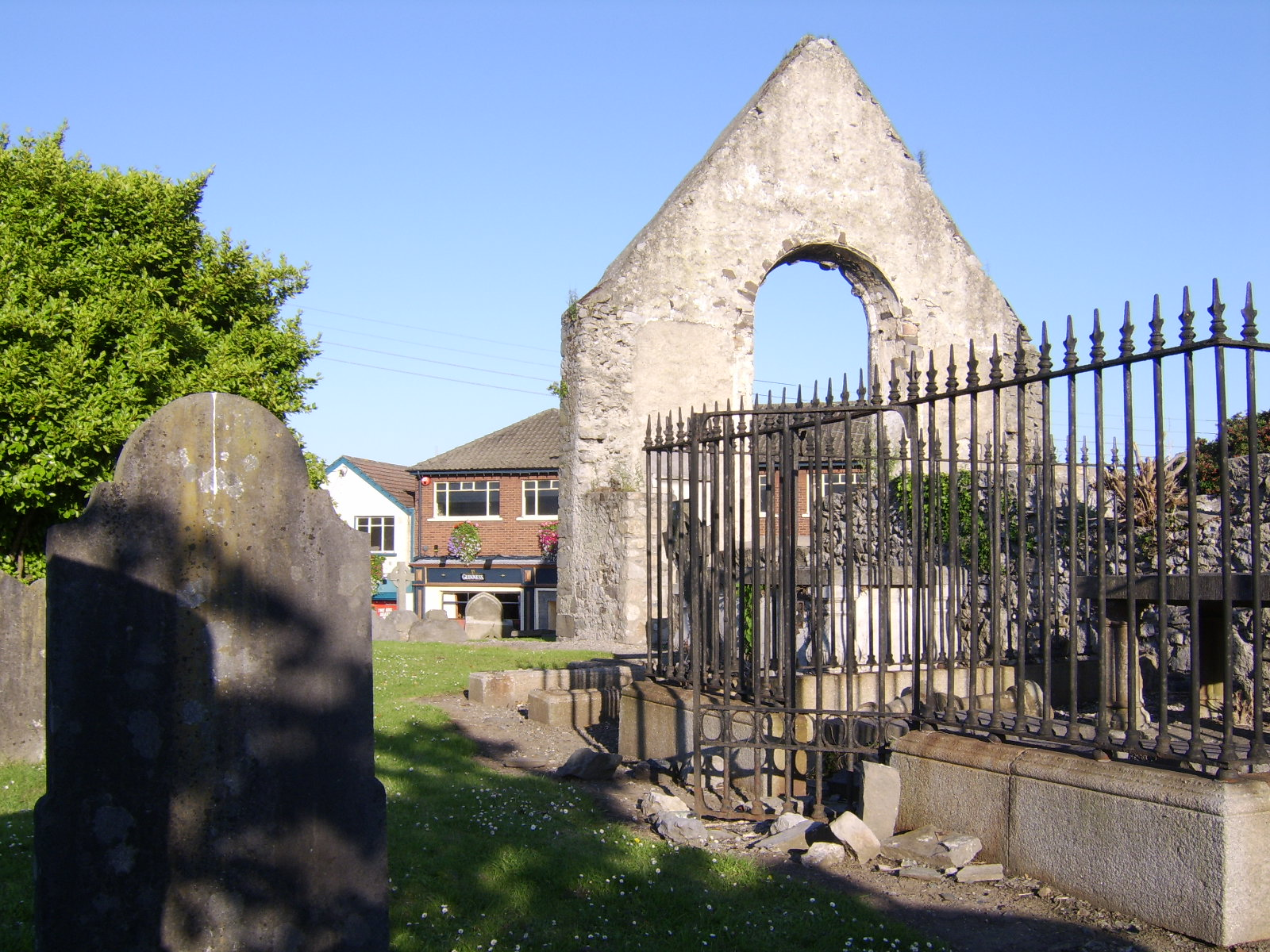
Old St Assam's church and yard, eastern side

St. Assam's is a pair of historic churches in the village of Raheny, Dublin. One was built for the local Roman Catholic community of the area after the revival of religious rights and no longer serves the primary church. The other is a ruin in the middle of the village. Both buildings lie within the area of the ráth (ring fort) which gives the village and district their name, and which was perhaps 110 m across.

== Background ==
Settlement in the Raheny area dates back to at least Celtic times, and a Christian establishment may date back to early Christian times in Ireland. The Parish of Raheny was erected in the 12th century, no later than 1152, probably initially in the Archdiocese of Glendalough and then in the Fingal Deanery of the Diocese of Dublin, and almost certainly had had a church for many years by then.

The first surviving reference to a church building in the area dates from 1189, in a papal bull of Clement. The Chapel of Raheny is mentioned again in a concession of the Archbishop of Dublin (1372) and a will (John Sheriff, 1472), which left money "for the care of the churches of Raheny, Coolock and Little Grange". No specific church name is given in any of these documents.

== The 1609 church ==
From a reference in the Parliamentary Gazetteer to 1609, the older of the current churches may have been standing in some form. Whatever building was there, the regal visitation report of 1615 for north County Dublin references it, with repairs due to the chancel. By this period of the early 17th century, the church was almost certainly operating within the established church, the Church of Ireland, albeit most of the population were Catholic, probably worshipping in houses, or perhaps at Coolock or Artaine (see Parish of Coolock (Roman Catholic).

== "Old" St. Assam's, 1712 ==
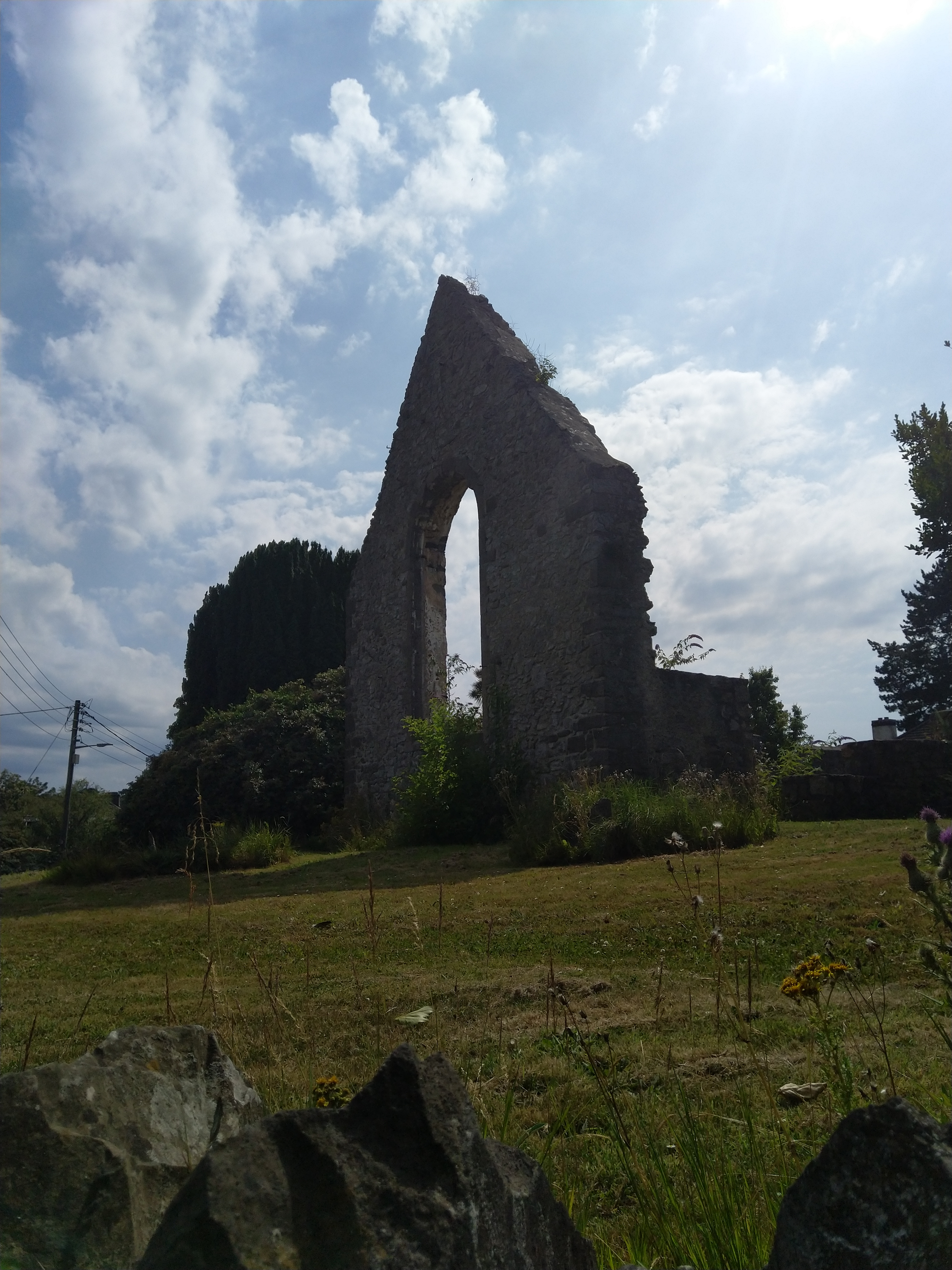
The old St Assam's Church

The now-ruined Church of St. Assam, locally known as "the old Protestant church", was rebuilt in 1712 on the site of "the parochial church dedicated to St. Assam", according to a dedication stone in the wall. It was a simple structure, 16.25 m by 7.15 m externally (with walls 0.75 m thick), and a mid-19th century plan shows a porch at the west end and a vestry at the east end of the north side, with internal arrangements for 116 worshippers. The porch is described in the Parliamentary Gazetteer as having a flat bell turret while the still-high east gable had a large window with tracery. Rectangular sockets on the walls may have been used to hold wooden panelling prior to the closure of the church in 1889, following the building of All Saints Church a few hundred metres citywards.

The church is surrounded by a walled graveyard, long closed to burials, beyond one wall of which is one of Raheny's three old schoolhouses.

The church was kept in order for some time after closure but represented a considerable burden on the small Church of Ireland Parish of Raheny and was eventually partially dismantled, most notably in 1920. Later still, in 1976, church and graveyard were transferred to the care of Dublin Corporation.

== "New" St. Assam's, 1859 ==
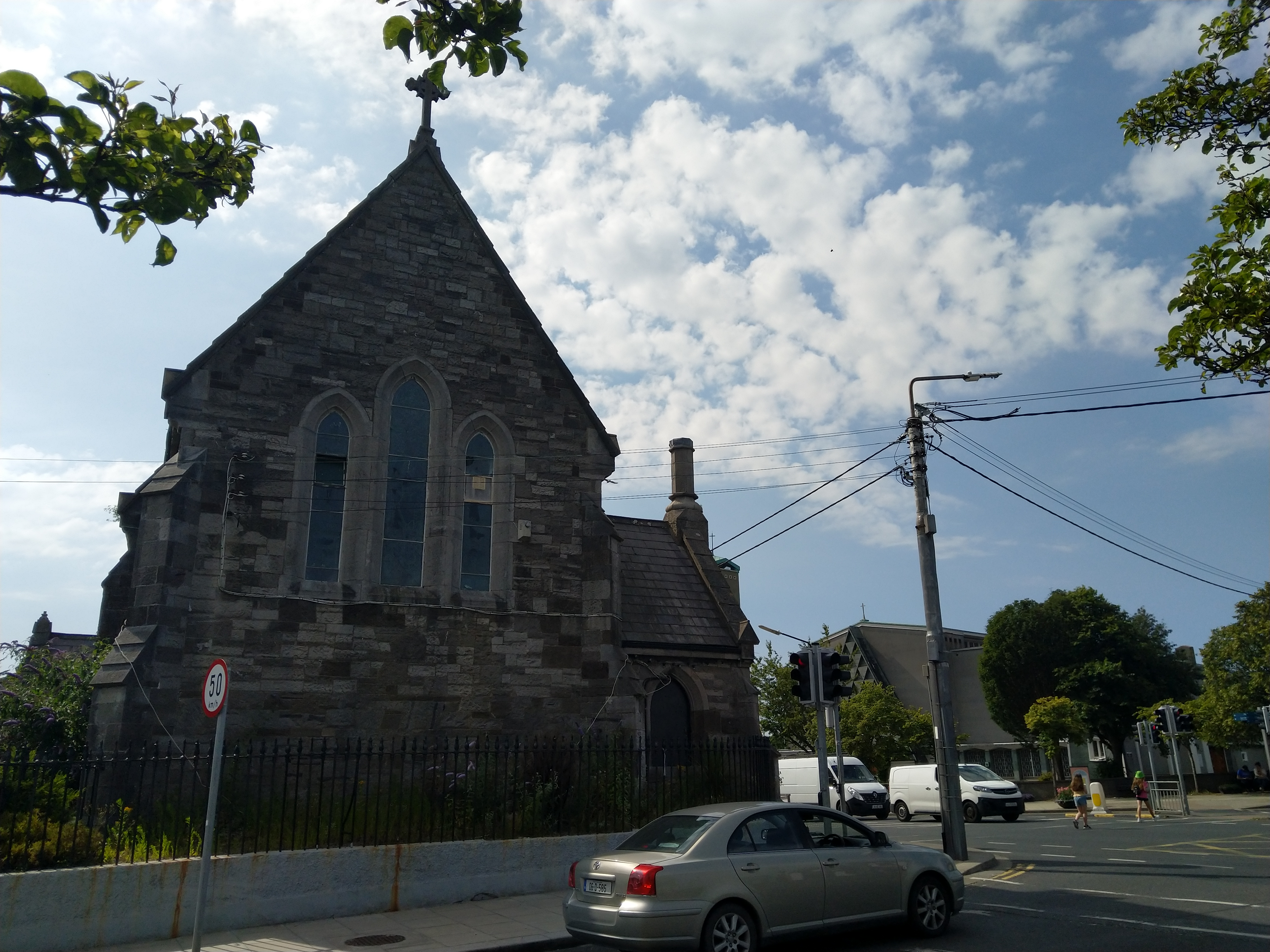
The newer St Assam's church, gable

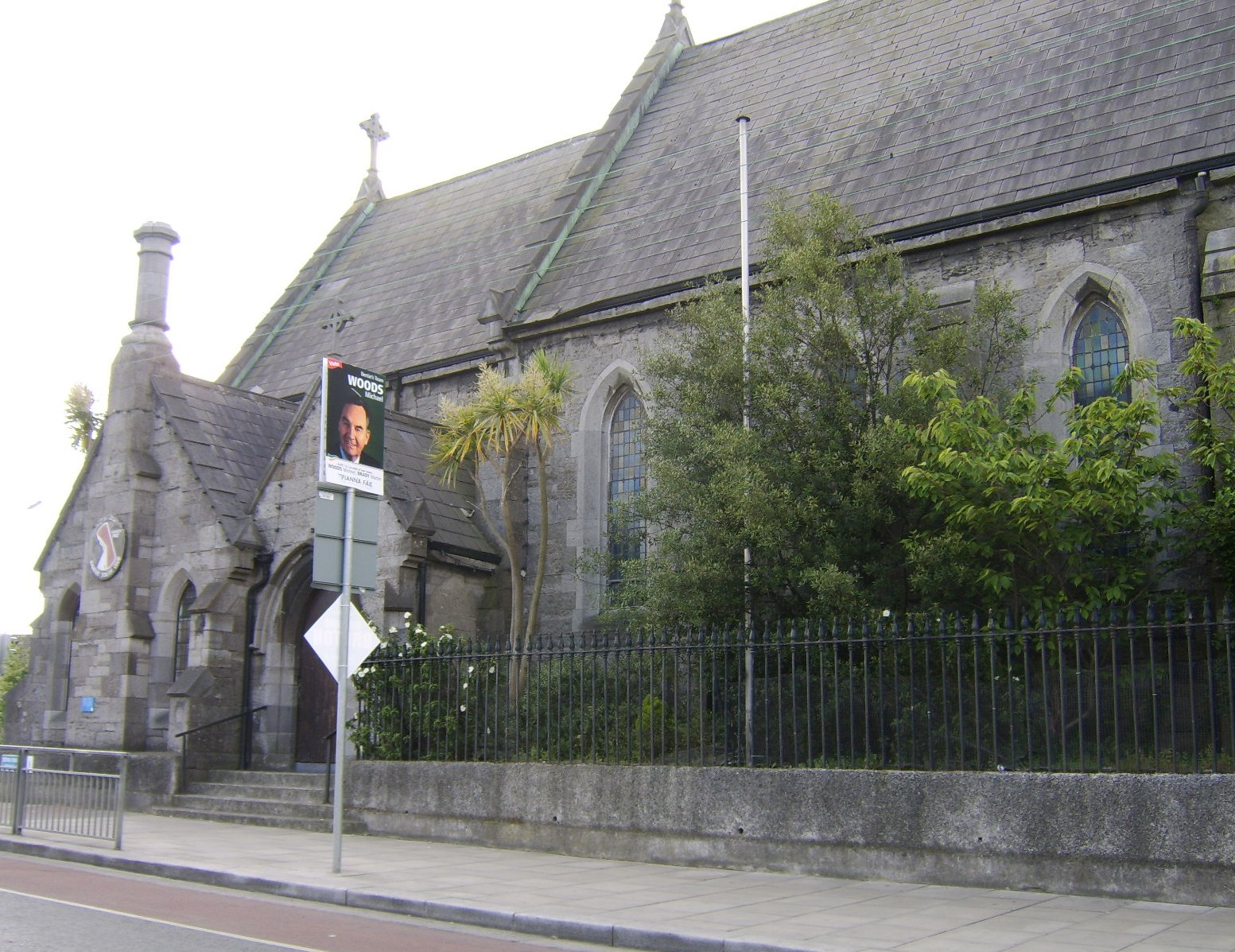
The newer St Assam's church, side view

Following years of restrictions, Roman Catholics gradually began to rebuild parochial structures and church facilities across Ireland from the early-mid 19th century. The historic Parish of Raheny had been merged into a union parish, based initially around Coolock, and later Clontarf, and this began to be broken up in the mid-18th century. As part of this process, it was decided to restore Catholic public worship in Raheny (most locals worshipped at Coolock, and some perhaps at Clontarf), and land was secured at the top of Main Street, running towards the Santry River. Subscriptions were collected and as was common in that period, came from people of various denominations.

A design was commissioned by the well-known architect Patrick Byrne, who also worked on a number of other churches, and the first stone was laid in 1859. The church was officially opened in 1864 by the Catholic Archbishop of Dublin, Dr. Cullen, with a gala reception at a local "big house", Raheny Park, afterwards.

The church was built in the Gothic style, with a small belfry at one end, and a range of stained glass in the windows. It has a door at the north east, leading to a porch, then a small lobby, with a meeting room to the left and the nave to the right.

St. Assam's, initially one of several churches in larger parochial structures, became Parish Church of Raheny when that area resumed its independent existence and served the fast-growing Parish of Raheny.

An engraved Celtic cross stands next to the church in memory of Marie Elizabeth Hayes, an influential medical missionary who grew up in Raheny and served as a member of the Cambridge Mission to Delhi.

=== Cessation of routine worship ===
Regular worship ceased when the massive Church of Our Lady Mother of Divine Grace was built across the Howth Road.

Still owned by the Parish, still consecrated, and occasionally used for full-scale worship until the early 1970s, the church continued in use for many years, accommodating meetings, and activities for children and teenagers. These activities included youth prayer services, including Taize prayer, and for 16 years, St Joseph's Youth Club. To maximise usage potential, it was divided horizontally, being fitted with a ceiling, creating a large upper room. To the rear of the church, there is a strip of land, and a basketball court was created for young people, though this became disused in the 1990s.

Some of the land around the church was provided to the local unit of the then Catholic Boy Scouts of Ireland (CBSI) scouting organisation for their den, and on this area of land is also one of the three old schoolhouses of Raheny, used as a basic clubhouse by the Raheny Shamrocks Athletic Club. Another plot of land was made available to the Raheny and District Credit Union when it relocated from Main Street. Remnants of the ringfort (rath) which gave Raheny its name can be seen on these lands.

=== Disposal and plans ===
Mid-2008, all usage of the facility ceased, after it was determined that considerable, and costly, work would be required to bring it up to modern building and safety standards. In November 2008, it was announced by the Parish Priest and the Parish Finance Committee, after consultation with the Archdiocese and the Parish Pastoral Council, that agreement had been reached with the local credit union for that body to acquire the old church, which would be deconsecrated and converted into offices. The sale was conditional on the Credit Union securing permission for the redevelopment, which would respect the former church's history and protected status. A side letter to the sale agreement allowed the Credit Union to erect and use a prefabricated building at the back of the main church car park, to be removed once the new offices are open. The proceeds of the sale would be used for works on and within the Church of Our Lady Mother of Divine Grace, and other parish pastoral projects. As of May 2019, the Credit Union obtained permission to construct beside the church.

== Status ==
The newer St. Assam's is listed as a protected structure under the Dublin City Development Plan.
