= Graham Dale =

Irish-born United States Marine and writer

- Born: 11 January 1978; Raheny, Dublin, Ireland
- Died: 8 December 2023 (aged 45)
- Military career
- Allegiance: United States of America; Ireland; Ukraine
- Branch: United States Marine Corps; Ireland, Irish Army Reserves
- Service years: 2002–2008 (U.S. Marines)
- Rank: Corporal
- Commands: None (Enlisted)
- Conflicts: Global War on Terrorism: Iraq War
- Other work: Computer Network Engineer

Graham Dale, born January 1978 in Dublin, Ireland, was a US Marine, later a network engineer and writer. He later fought for the Ukrainian military after Russia's invasion of Ukraine in 2022, and was killed in December 2023.

== Life ==
Dale was born in Raheny, Dublin, Ireland. He emigrated to the United States in 2000. He served with the US Marine Corp., including in Iraq.

In Iraq, Dale was stationed at Fire Operations Base (FOB) Hit. Here, his Mobile Assault Platoon “squad” worked in and out of both the Hit and Haditha Areas of Operation (AO). Dale participated in two major operations and three battles while in Iraq - the Battle of Hit (September, 2004 to October 2004), Operation Phantom Fury (the 2nd Battle of Fallujah) from November 2004 to December 2004, and Operation River Blitz (February 2005) which commenced the Battle of Haditha following the deadly ambush that killed four Marines in Haditha on January 26, 2005, after a raid on a farm house suspected of hiding Al Qaeda insurgents. One patrol, Dale performed CPR on fellow squad member Joseph Fite who was mortally wounded after hostile actions. This often haunted Dale years later. Dale recorded well over 200 combat missions and patrols during his combat tour in Iraq (Operation Iraqi Freedom II - II) from August 2004 to March 2005.

Graham befriended fellow combat veteran and US Marine, James Foley. Foley, encouraged Graham to seek counseling and personally handled his VA package for disability benefits. As a result of his trauma in Iraq, Dale was rated for PTSD and received disability pension for his disorder.

As of 2019 he resided in Cedar Park, Texas, where he worked as a computer network engineer. He was also an active Volunteer Firefighter and EMT with the Jollyville fire department in Austin, Texas.

In early 2022, Graham travelled first to Poland and then to Ukraine to transport humanitarian aid in the Russo-Ukrainian War. At some point after this, he joined the Ukrainian Army. He was killed in action on the 8th December 2023.

=== Publication ===
Dale is the author of The Green Marine: An Irishman's War in Iraq, in which he chronicles his enlistment into the US Marines and tour of duty in Iraq. In response to the horrors inflicted upon his newly adopted country during the 911 attacks in the United States, Dale joined the US Marines and served for six years, including one tour in Iraq. His book provides a first hand account of his unique status of an Irishman in the US Marines from his days in training through to combat in Iraq.
