= All Saints' Church, Raheny =

Church of Ireland premises in Dublin, Ireland

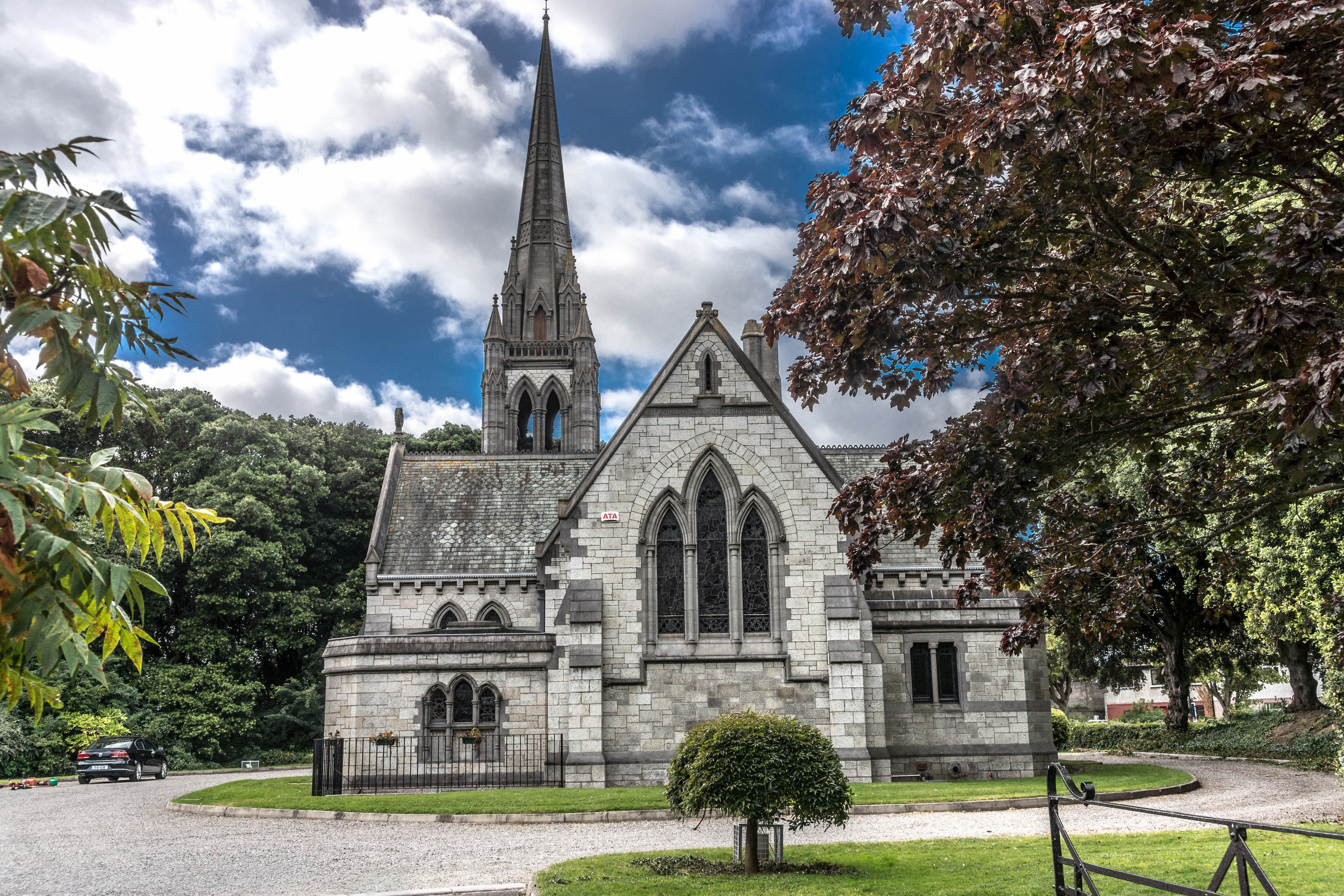
- All Saints' Church, Howth Road, Raheny
- All Saints' Church, Raheny
- 53.37875°N 6.17977°W
- Location: Raheny, Dublin
- Country: Ireland
- Denomination: Church of Ireland
- Website: https://allsaintsraheny.org/

History
- Status: Parish church
- Dedication: All Saints
- Dedicated: 1889
- Consecrated: 1969

Architecture
- Completed: 1889
- Construction cost: 9000 Irish pounds

Administration
- Province: Province of Dublin
- Diocese: Diocese of Dublin and Glendalough
- Parish: Raheny (in Union with Coolock)

Clergy
- Rector: Norman McCausland

All Saints' Church is the Church of Ireland Parish Church of the Parish of Raheny, prominent on the Howth Road as it approaches the centre of Raheny, Dublin, Ireland. It lies in walled grounds with mature tree cover, just south of the village core, and is widely hailed as a fine architectural specimen.

== History ==
All Saints' was built for the Church of Ireland Parish of Raheny, to replace the historic St. Assam's Church in the centre of Raheny village.

=== Construction ===
In 1881, Arthur Guinness, Baron Ardilaun, who already held certain rights in the parish, notably the right of presentation of the rector, made a proposal to construct a new church, on a site he would provide at the village end of his St. Anne's Estate, and this was agreed by the parish in 1885. Lord Ardilaun's father, Sir Benjamin Lee Guinness, had previously agreed with the parish to build a new church, but the plans did not come to fruition.

The new church was sponsored (at a cost of around 9,000 pounds in the 1880s) by Lord Ardilaun. The building was designed by George Ashlin and built almost entirely of Irish materials. The main contractors were Messrs Collen Brothers of Dublin and Portadown, who also carried out other work for Lord Ardilaun.

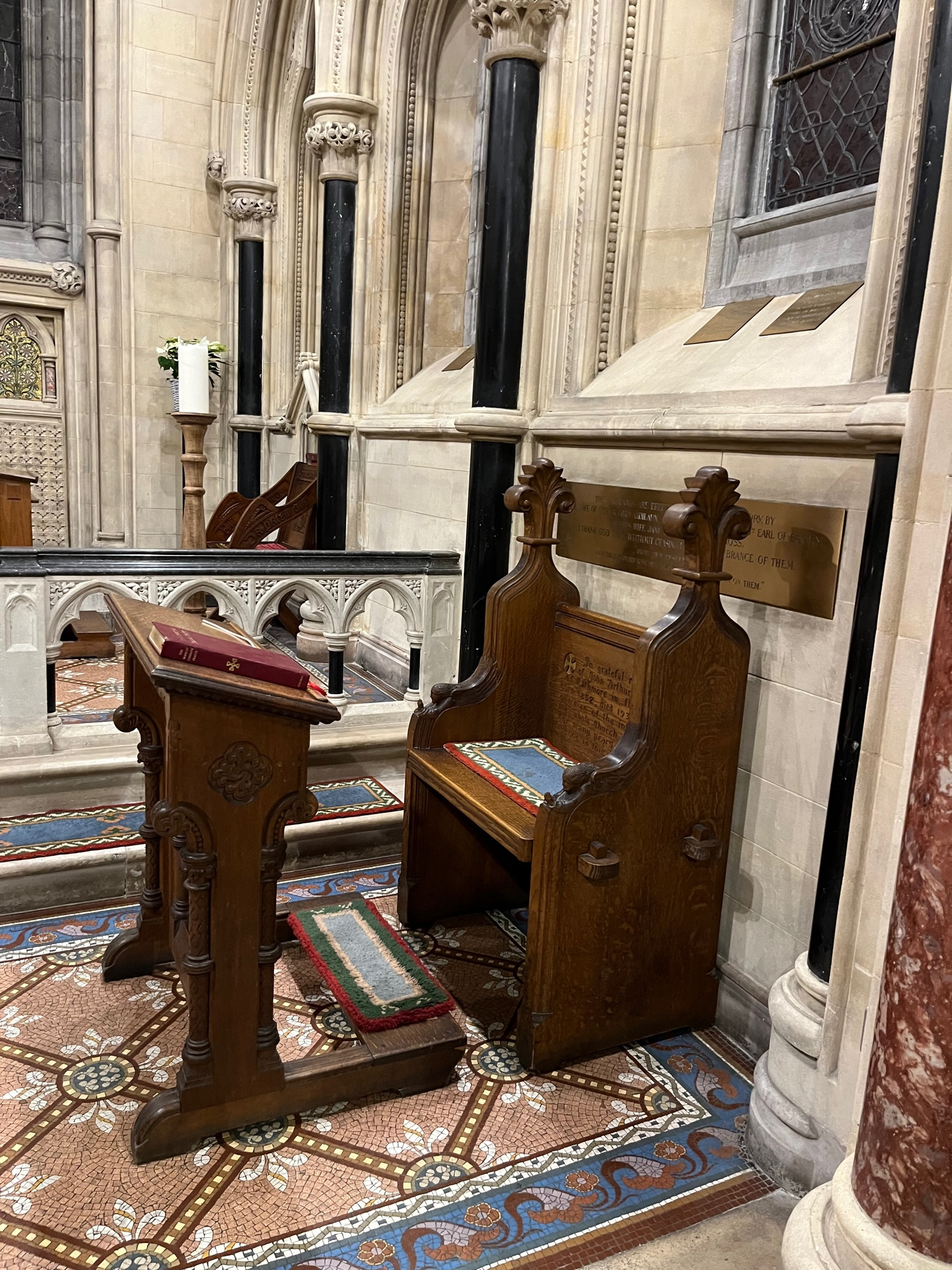
Pew in Irish oak at All Saints Church, Raheny

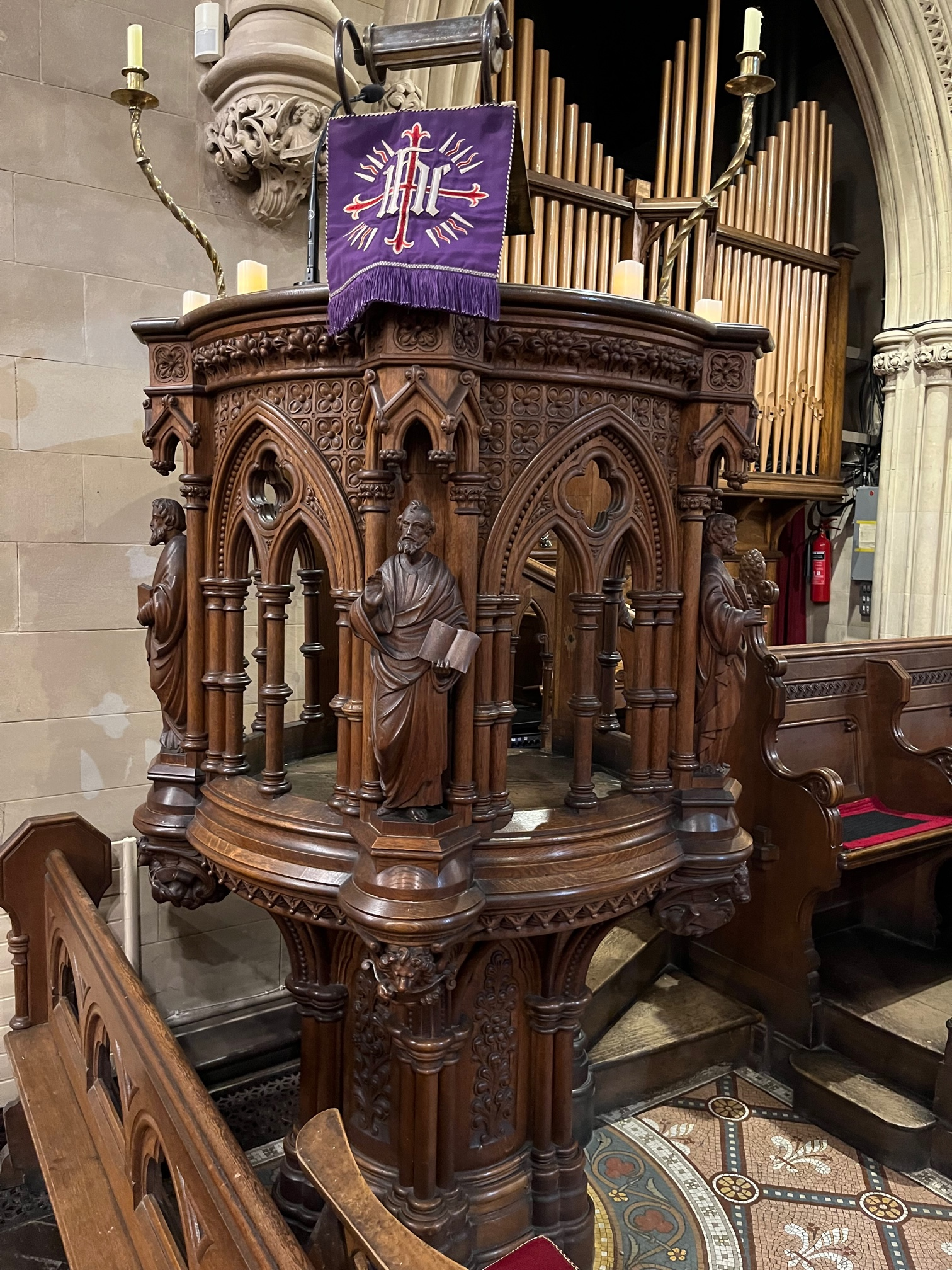
Pulpit in Irish oak at All Saints Church, Raheny

The building style is described as "early English", and it has a cruciform shape. The walls are of Wicklow granite, with limestone dressings, and there is a substantial belfry, with Cumberland slates, an octagonal spire and a weathervane. There is also a small crypt with a mortuary chapel, where some of the Guinness family are buried.

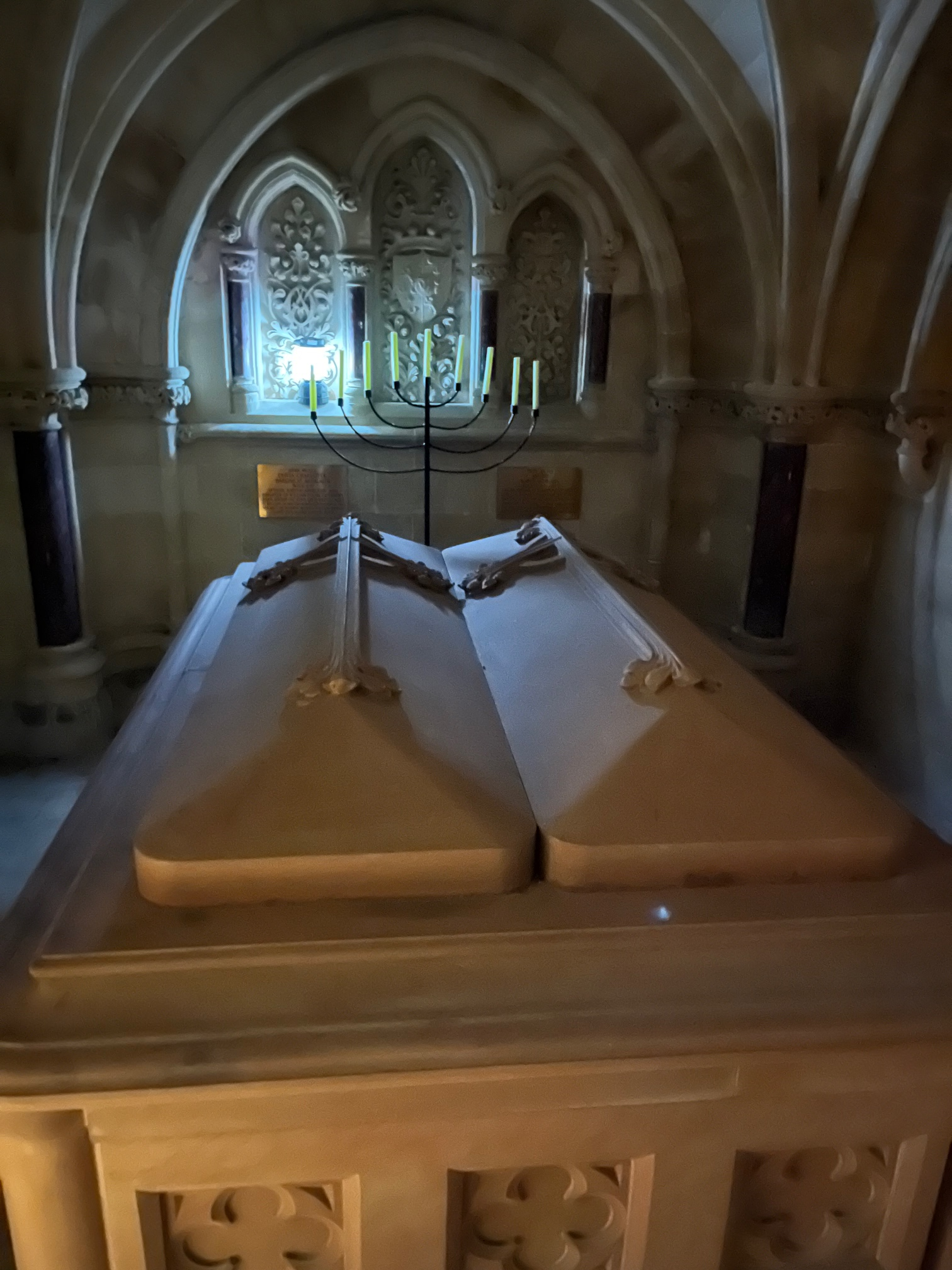
Tomb in the crypt of All Saints

The shape of the building was cut out at the Raheny end of the estate, with a curtilage provided, in 1885, and building commenced shortly thereafter, and the new All Saints' Church was completed around October 1889. The Service of Dedication of the church was planned for All Saints' Day 1889 (1 November) but due to a death in the Guinness family was delayed to 16 December 1889. Full consecration could not take place, as the freehold of the land was not available at the time, being held by the Howth Estate. Lord Ardilaun committed to maintaining the building on two conditions, firstly that the rites of the church be standard, and second that both the new and old (St. Assam's) churches be well-maintained. A tree-lined avenue was laid out between the church and the main body of the St Anne's Estate.

=== Developments ===
A new organ was provided for All Saints' after a new Rector was appointed in 1918, by Lady Ardilaun, in memory of her late husband. In 1926, a one-tonne bell was given in memory of Lady Ardilaun by her nephew and principal heir, Bishop Benjamin Plunket, retired Bishop of Meath. In 1938, the Bishop began steps to transfer the church to the Representative Church Body on behalf of the parish, and this was effective on 1 January 1939, though in the absence of the freehold of the land, full consecration as parish church was still not possible. On All Saints' Day, 1939, the church's fiftieth anniversary was celebrated.

In 1945, an additional acre of ground near the church was purchased from Dublin Corporation. In 1960, the parish entered into a Union with the Parish of Coolock, which has its own historic church, St. John the Evangelist.

In 1969, the new Parochial Hall was dedicated as "Johnston Hall." At about the same time in 1969, the freehold of the land at All Saints was finally purchased from the Howth Estate, for 250 pounds, leaving the way open for full consecration.

== Later developments ==
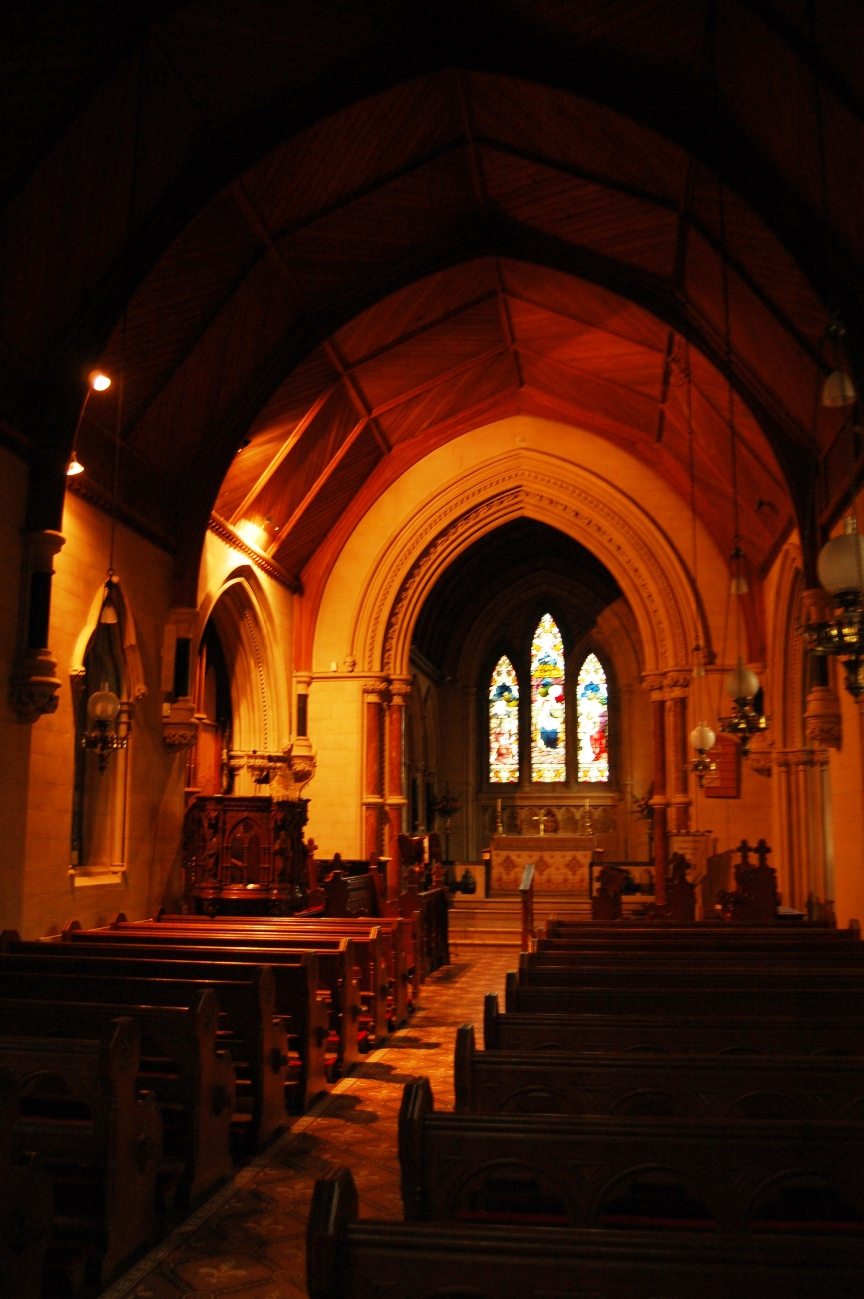
Church interior

The church was finally consecrated on 16 December 1989, after a memorial service on 1 November. It is occasionally rented for concerts.

Adjacent to All Saints' are the Johnson Hall and All Saints' Hall, used for church activities, including meetings of the Girl Guides, the Boys Brigade and the Mothers' Union, and also available to rent for community activities. Fundraising "car boot sales" are held in the grounds at certain times.

There is also a modern rectory within the church grounds, replacing the original rectory which stood on glebe lands across the Howth Road, and a well-preserved ornamented gate lodge, for the verger.

=== Restoration works ===
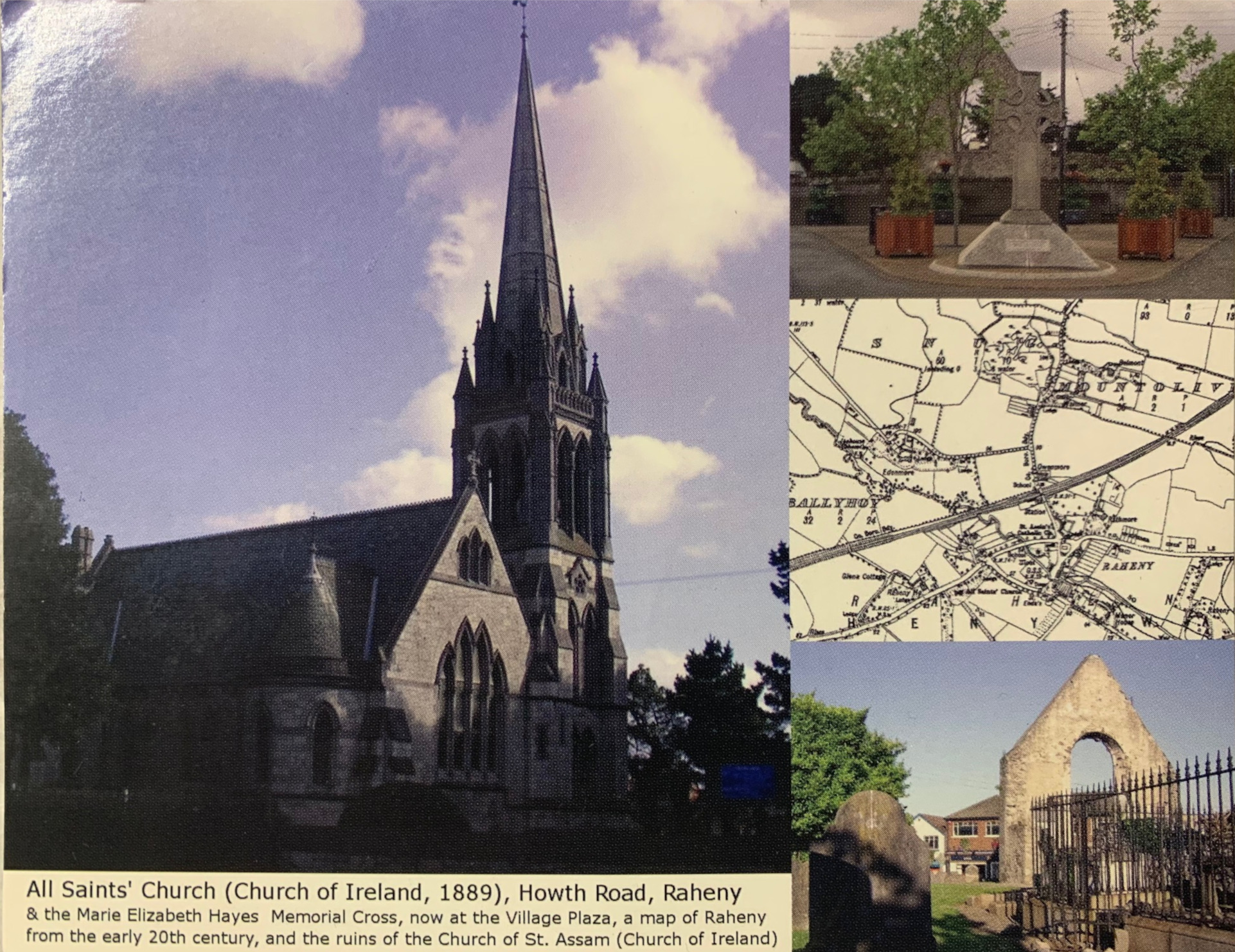
Fundraising postcard for the 2010 Roof Appeal

Some restoration work was done on stained glass windows in the 2000s, and in April 2010, it was announced that the church required extensive roof repairs and an appeal for a quarter of a million euro was launched while a Government heritage building grant was received in early May. Further fundraising events included a Whist Day in December 2010 and a Barn Dance in January 2011, along with a Sale of Work, and a fundraising postcard and website. The works, which were managed for around 150,000 euro eventually, were completed by 2012.

== Popular culture ==
U2 front man Bono married Alison Hewson at the church on 21 August 1982, with Adam Clayton as best man.

== Sources ==
- Raheny, Dublin, Select Vestry of the Parish of Raheny: 1990, "Through Countless Ages: The Story of the Church and Parish of All Saints', and the District of Raheny" - Arthur Garrett
- raheny.com (as at 29 May 2007)
