= List of shipwrecks in August 1871 =

The list of shipwrecks in August 1871 includes ships sunk, foundered, grounded, or otherwise lost during August 1871.

== 1 August ==
List of shipwrecks: 1 August 1871
Ship	State	Description
Brinkburn	United Kingdom	The brig was wrecked at Falmouth, Jamaica. Her nineteen crew survived. She was on a voyage from Falmouth to London.
Eden	France	The brig struck floating wreckage 10 nautical miles (19 km) west of Lundy Island, Devon, United Kingdom and sank. Her crew were rescued. She was on a voyage from Swansea, Glamorgan, United Kingdom to Bordeaux, Gironde.
Eleanor	United Kingdom	The brig departed from Waterford for New York City, United States. No further trace, presumed foundered with the loss of all hands.
Helen Black	United Kingdom	The barque departed from Hong Kong for Fuzhou, China. No further trace, presumed foundered with the loss of all hands.

== 2 August ==
List of shipwrecks: 2 August 1871
Ship	State	Description
Alexandra II	United Kingdom	The steamship ran aground at Fleetwood, Lancashire. She was on a voyage from Fleetwood to Blackpool. She was refloated but had to be beached.
Glenallan	United Kingdom	The ship was driven ashore at Caribou Point, Canada. She was on a voyage from the Clyde to Montreal, Quebec, Canada. She subsequently sank.
Magdala	United Kingdom	The ship was driven ashore in St Lawrence Cove. She was on a voyage from Liverpool, Lancashire to Campobello Island, New Brunswick, Canada.
Pride of the Port	United States	The ship ran aground in the Creek Channel. She was on a voyage from Calcutta, India to Boston, Massachusetts. She was refloated and resumed her voyage.

== 3 August ==
List of shipwrecks: 3 August 1871
Ship	State	Description
Conquest	United Kingdom	The tug collided with Emigrant (United Kingdom) and sanki in the Firth of Forth. Her crew were rescued.
Prince George	United Kingdom	The ship was wrecked on Diamond Island, British Burma.
St. Kilda	United Kingdom	The yacht was driven ashore at Ashton, Renfrewshire.
William Tibbetts	United States	The steamship ran ashore on Nashawena Island, Massachusetts. She was on a voyage from New York to Salem, Massachusetts.

== 4 August ==
List of shipwrecks: 4 August 1871
Ship	State	Description
Allerston	United Kingdom	The brig was driven ashore at Hamra, Gotland, Sweden. She was on a voyage from Leith, Lothian to Kronstadt, Russia. She was refloated and towed in to Slitohamn, Sweden.
Brothers	United Kingdom	The trow foundered off Mere Point. She was on a voyage from Cardiff, Glamorgan to Bridgwater, Somerset.
Fortuna	United Kingdom	The ship was driven ashore 5 nautical miles (9.3 km) north of Campbeltown, Argyllshire. She was on a voyage from Troon, Ayrshire to Londonderry.
Jane	United Kingdom	The brigantine was wrecked on the Mizenhead Sandbank, in the Irish Sea off the coast of County Wicklow. Her five crew were rescued by the Wicklow Lifeboat. She was on a voyage from Dublin to Newport, Monmouthshire.
Jean Ingelow	United States	The full-rigged ship ran aground on the Eastern Rangafulla Sand, in the Hooghly River and was severely damaged. She was on a voyage from Boston, Massachusetts to Calcutta, India. She was refloated and taken in to Calcutta.
Kleinkinderen	Netherlands	The galiot collided with the brig Hoorarganer (Norway) and sank in the English Channel south east of Start Point, Devon, United Kingdom. Her crew were rescued by Hoorarganer. Kleinkinderen was on a voyage from Vlaardingen, South Holland to Gibraltar.
Southampton	United States	The ship was destroyed by fire at Birkenhead, Cheshire, United Kingdom. She was on a voyage from Liverpool, Lancashire, United Kingdom to New York.

== 5 August ==
List of shipwrecks: 5 August 1871
Ship	State	Description
Aurelie	Canada	The barque was driven ashore east of Dungeness, Kent, United Kingdom. She was on a voyage from Kronstadt, Russia to Bristol, Gloucestershire, United Kingdom. She was refloated and towed in to Dover, Kent.
Barton	United Kingdom	The steamship ran aground on the Askegrund, in the Baltic Sea off Höganäs, Sweden. She was on a voyage from South Shields, County Durham to Kronstadt, Russia. She was refloated on 10 August with the assistance of two steamships.
Eleanor	United Kingdom	The schooner departed from Waterford for Providence, Rhode Island, United States. No further trace, presumed foundered with all hands.
Olive Branch	United Kingdom	The ship ran aground off the Nakkehoved Lighthouse, Denmark. She was on a voyage from South Shields, County Durham to Kronstadt, Russia. She was refloated and towed in to Helsingør, Denmark.
Roscius	United Kingdom	The brigantine was wrecked on the Arklow Banks, in the Irish Sea off the coast of County Wicklow. Her crew were rescued. She was on a voyage from Ardrossan, Ayrshire to Newport, Monmouthshire. She was refloated by the Arklow Lifeboat on 7 August and towed in to Dublin.

== 6 August ==
List of shipwrecks: 6 August 1871
Ship	State	Description
Constance	United Kingdom	The brigantine foundered in the Atlantic Ocean (45°00′N 9°25′W). Her seven crew were rescued by the schooner Talavor (United Kingdom). Constance was on a voyage from Swansea, Glamorgan to Barcelona, Spain.
Ellina	United Kingdom	The ship departed from Niuzhuang, China for Hong Kong. No further trace, presumed foundered with the loss of all hands.
Francesca Seghezza	Italy	The brig was wrecked on rocks west of The Lizard, Cornwall, United Kingdom. Her crew were rescued. She was on a voyage from Taganrog, Russia to London, United Kingdom.
Maria Josephine	France	The ship departed from Truxillo, British Honduras for a British port. No further trace, presumed foundered with the loss of all hands.
Martaban	United Kingdom	The ship ran aground on the Muckraputty Lumps, in the Hooghly River. She was on a voyage from Liverpool, Lancashire to Calcutta, India. She was refloated and taken in to Calcutta.
Rinaldo	United Kingdom	The steamship was severely damaged by fire with the loss of a crew member. She was on a voyage from Malta to Constantinople, Ottoman Empire, where she arrived on 10 August.

== 7 August ==
List of shipwrecks: 7 August 1871
Ship	State	Description
Robert Ingraham	United Kingdom	The steamship struck a sunken rock and sank at New York, United States. She was on a voyage from Sydney, Nova Scotia, Canada to New York. She was refloated on 15 August.
Weser	Germany	The steamship ran aground in the Solent and the entrance to the Southampton Water. She was on a voyage from Bremen to New York, United States. She was refloated with assistance from the paddle tug Camel (United Kingdom) and was taken in to Southampton, Hampshire, United Kingdom.

== 8 August ==
List of shipwrecks: 8 August 1871
Ship	State	Description
Bulwark	United Kingdom	The ship ran aground in the Rangafullah Channel. She was on a voyage from Calcutta, India to London. She was refloated and resumed her voyage.
Counsellor	United Kingdom	The steamship ran aground on the Monsciar Reef, off Malta. She was refloated.
Lillie M.	United Kingdom	The barque sprang a leak and sank 12 nautical miles (22 km) south west of Islay. Her crew were rescued. she was on a voyage from Glasgow, Renfrewshire to Boston, Massachusetts, United States.
Marie	Belgium	The ship was wrecked on the Lucien Bank. She was on a voyage from Buenos Aires, Argentina to Antwerp.
Penelope	United Kingdom	The schooner ran aground on the Kimmeridge Ledges, in the English Channel off the coast of Dorset. She was on a voyage from Bangor, Caernarfonshire to London.
Volkyren	Germany	The ship departed from Pillau for Berwick upon Tweed, Northumberland, United Kingdom. No further trace, presumed foundered with the loss of all hands.
William Coulman	United Kingdom	The steamship ran aground at Goole, Yorkshire. She was on a voyage from Goole to Rotterdam, South Holland, Netherlands. She was refloated on 10 August and resumed her voyage.

== 9 August ==
List of shipwrecks: 9 August 1871
Ship	State	Description
Adèle	France	The barque was wrecked in a typhoon at Keelung, Formosa. Her fifteen crew were rescued.
Anne	United Kingdom	The schooner was driven ashore in a typhoon at Keelung. Her seven crew were rescued.
Arche d'Alliance	France	The barque ran aground at the mouth of the Brass River. She was refloated and resumed her voyage, but consequently sank off Saint Barthélemy. Her crew were rescued.
Batavia Packet	Netherlands	The ship was wrecked on the coast of Formosa. Her crew were rescued.
Catherine Apcar	India	The steamship collided with the steamship Despatch (United Kingdom) and sank in the North Sea 10 nautical miles (19 km) south of Flamborough Head, Yorkshire, United Kingdom. Her 25 crew were rescued by Despatch. Catherine Apcar was on a voyage from London to the River Tyne.
Vitus Bering	United Kingdom	The barque departed from Pori, Grand Duchy of Finland for an English port. Presumed subsequently foundered in the Kattegat as wreckage from the ship was discovered there.
Vulture	United Kingdom	The steamship struck rocks off the Saltee Islands, County Wexford and was damaged. She was on a voyage from Newport, Monmouthshire to Waterford.
Westward Ho	United Kingdom	The barque was wrecked in a typhoon at Keelung with the loss of two of her crew. There were at least eighteen survivors.

== 10 August ==
List of shipwrecks: 10 August 1871
Ship	State	Description
Anne	China	The schooner was driven ashore and wrecked in a typhoon at Keelung, Formosa.
Brilliant Star	United Kingdom	The ship ran aground in Bootle Bay. She was on a voyage from Liverpool, Lancashire to Wilmington, Delaware. She was refloated and resumed her voyage.
Henry	Canada	The ship ran aground off Skutskär, Sweden.
Josephine	United States	The brig was driven ashore and wrecked on "Sand Island", Maine. Her crew were rescued. She was on a voyage from Portland, Maine to Saint John, New Brunswick, Canada.
Loch Naw	United Kingdom	The barque was driven ashore in a typhoon at Tamsui, Formosa. She was refloated on 15 August.
Philorth	United Kingdom	The schooner struck a sunken rock at Skerryvore and was beached on Tiree, Inner Hebrides. Her crew were rescued. She was declared a total loss.
Roderick Dhu	United Kingdom	The barque was driven ashore at Havana, Cuba. She was on a voyage from Havana to Sagua La Grande, Cuba. She was refloated on 13 August and put back to Havana.

== 11 August ==
List of shipwrecks: 11 August 1871
Ship	State	Description
Diadem	United Kingdom	The ship departed from Navassa Island for a British port. No further trace, presumed foundered with the loss of all hands.
Isère	France	The steamship was damaged by fire at Havre de Grâce, Seine-Inférieure.
Sir James	United Kingdom	The barque was destroyed by fire at Buenos Aires, Argentina. Her crew were arrested on suspicion of arson. Nine of them were charged on 16 September. The remaining four crew then being in hospital in Buenos Aires. The crew were acquitted of the charge.

== 12 August ==
List of shipwrecks: 12 August 1871
Ship	State	Description
Peerless	United Kingdom	The ship departed from Navassa Island for Swansea, Glamorgan. No further trace, presumed foundered with the loss of all hands.
Sidonian	United Kingdom	The steamship ran ashore on Ailsa Craig. Her passengers were taken off. She was on a voyage from the Clyde to Alexandria, Egypt. She was refloated on 15 August and towed in to Greenock, Renfrewshire.
Unnamed	United Kingdom	A Thames barge was run down and sunk in the River Thames between Erith and Gravesend, Kent with loss of life.

== 14 August ==
List of shipwrecks: 14 August 1871
Ship	State	Description
Argo	United Kingdom	The ship collided with Wilhelm (Flag unknown) and sank in the River Carron. She was on a voyage from Newbiggin-by-the-Sea, Northumberland to Carronshore, Stirlingshire.
Cecilia	United Kingdom	The ship was driven ashore at Overstrand, Norfolk.
Charles Napier	United Kingdom	The ship was driven ashore at Blakeney, Norfolk. She was on a voyage from Sunderland, County Durham to Lymington, Hampshire. She was refloated the next day and taken in to Blakeney.
Lucknow	United Kingdom	The ship was driven ashore at Cromer, Norfolk.
Meteor	United Kingdom	The schooner was severely damaged by fire at Rotherhithe, Surrey.
Pride	United Kingdom	The ship was driven ashore at Runton, Norfolk. She was refloated and resumed her voyage.
Reckless	United Kingdom	The ship was driven ashore at Runton.
Rose	United Kingdom	The ship was driven ashore at Runton. She was refloated and taken to Blakeney, where she was beached.
Simon Peter	United Kingdom	The ship was driven ashore at Cromer.
Undine	United Kingdom	The schooner was driven ashore at Happisburgh, Norfolk. She was refloated the next day and taken in to Great Yarmouth, Norfolk in a leaky condition.
Viola	United Kingdom	The ship ran aground on Hartlepool Heugh. She was on a voyage from Riga, Russia to West Hartlepool, County Durham. She was refloated with the assistance of a tug and taken in to West Hartlepool.

== 15 August ==
List of shipwrecks: 15 August 1871
Ship	State	Description
Catterina Bollo	Italy	The barque was destroyed by fire at Berdyanski, Russia.
Dragoe	Germany	The brig ran aground at Copenhagen, Denmark. She was on a voyage from Danzig to Grimsby, Lincolnshire, United Kingdom.
Glasgow	United Kingdom	The steamship collided with the steamship Morocco (United Kingdom) in the River Mersey. Her passengers were taken off by Morocco. Glasgow was on a voyage from Liverpool to Dublin. She put back to Liverpool, where she sank.
H. Gilbert	United Kingdom	The schooner ran aground on the East Hoyle Bank, in Liverpool Bay. She subsequently floated off and was taken in to Liverpool in a derelict condition.
Kim Eng Seng	Straits Settlements	The full-rigged ship was wrecked off the China Bucker Lighthouse, Burma. Her crew were rescued. She was on a voyage from Mauritius to Rangoon, Burma.
Rachael	United Kingdom	The ship was driven ashore at Cromer, Norfolk. She was on a voyage from South Shields, County Durham to Ramsgate, Kent.
Unidne	United Kingdom	The schooner was driven ashore at Happisburgh, Norfolk.

== 16 August ==
List of shipwrecks: 16 August 1871
Ship	State	Description
Colombo	United Kingdom	The ship put in to Ascension Island on fire. She was on a voyage from Calcutta India to London. The fire was extinguished. She resumed her voyage on 18 August.
Lodona	United States	The steamship was wrecked off the coast of Florida with the loss of 30 of the 42 people on board. She was on a voyage from New York to New Orleans, Louisiana.
Melbourne	United Kingdom	The barque was abandoned in the Atlantic Ocean after heavy damage in a hurricane, water ingress and falling on her beam ends. Her crew were rescued the following day by the steamship Mendes Nuñez (Spain). Melbourne was on a voyage from Cárdenas, Cuba to "North Hatteras", North Carolina, or to New York City, with sugar.
Nummer Eins	Germany	The ship was driven ashore at Dragør, Denmark. She was on a voyage from Danzig to Grimsby, Lincolnshire, United Kingdom.

== 17 August ==
List of shipwrecks: August 1871
Ship	State	Description
Armida	Sweden	The brig departed from Greenock, Renfrewshire, United Kingdom for Sundsvall. No further trace, presumed foundered with the loss of all hands.
Belem	France	The brig ran aground off Tangier, Morocco. She was on a voyage from Saint John's, Newfoundland Colony to Marseille, Bouches-du-Rhône. She was refloated and resumed her voyage.
Belgian	United Kingdom	The steamship ran aground at Garden Point, in the Hooghly River. She was on a voyage from Calcutta, India to London. She was refloated and put back to Calcutta for repairs.
Pomona	United States	The brig was driven ashore 25 nautical miles (46 km) south of Cape Canaveral, Florida.

== 18 August ==
List of shipwrecks: 18 August 1871
Ship	State	Description
Compeer	United Kingdom	The steamship was driven ashore and wrecked at Burnmouth, Berwickshire. All 23 people on board were rescued. She was on a voyage from Arkhangelsk, Russia to Dunkirk, Nord, France. She subsequently became a wreck.
Ella	United Kingdom	The yacht was driven ashore at Elsie Point, Caithness. All sixteen people on board were rescued by a fishing boat.
Hibernian	United Kingdom	The steamship ran aground at Moville, County Donegal. She was on a voyage from Liverpool, Lancashire to Quebec City, Canada. She was refloated and resumed her voyage.
Index	United Kingdom	The ship foundered in the Bristol Channel 30 nautical miles (56 km) off Lundy Island Devon. Her crew were rescued. She was on a voyage from Llanelly, Glamorgan to Honfleur, Manche, France.
Maori	United Kingdom	The barque was wrecked off Jersey, Channel Islands with the loss of all but one of her crew. The survivors was rescued by a Spanish ship, according to a message in a bottle that washed up at Chesil Beach, Dorset on 28 August.
Maggie H.	Canada	The schooner heeled over in a squall at Miramichi, New Brunswick and was damaged.
Mary Black	United Kingdom	The barque was abandoned in the Bay of Biscay in a sinking condition. Her crew were rescued by the brig Madge (United Kingdom). Mary Black was on a voyage from Liverpool, Lancashire to Barcelona, Spain.
Minnie	United Kingdom	The yacht foundered off Salcombe, Devon with the loss of all three people on board.
Nova Alerta	France	The ship was driven ashore near Havre de Grâce, Seine-Inférieure. She was on a voyage from Cardiff, Glamorgan, United Kingdom to Havre de Grâce. She was refloated on 30 August and towed in to Havre de Grâce.
Peter	United Kingdom	The Mersey Flat was driven ashore and severely damaged at Llandudno, Caernarfonshire. Her three crew were rescued.
T. W. Rhodes	United Kingdom	The steamship was abandoned at the entrance to the English Channel. All on board were rescued, some of them by Roman Empire (United Kingdom). T. W. Rhodes was on a voyage from Swansea, Glamorgan to Valencia, Spain.
Vanguard	United Kingdom	The ship was destroyed by fire at sea. Her crew were rescued by the barque J. B. D. (France. Vanguard was on a voyage from Newport, Monmouthshire to Rio de Janeiro, Brazil.

== 19 August ==
List of shipwrecks: 19 August 1871
Ship	State	Description
Caliph	United Kingdom	The ship was sighted in the Gaspar Strait whilst on a voyage from London to Shanghai, China. No further trace, presumed foundered with the loss of all hands.
Goa	France	The ship departed from Trinidad for the Clyde. No further trace, presumed foundered with the loss of all hands.
Heron	United Kingdom	The yacht ran aground on the Pole Sand, in the English Channel and was wrecked. She was on a voyage from Dawlish to Exeter, Devon.
Jane	United Kingdom	The ship ran aground on the Burbo Bank, in Liverpool Bay. She was on a voyage from Hamburg, Germany to Liverpool, Lancashire. She was refloated but had to be beached in the River Mersey.
Two Brothers	United Kingdom	The ketch ran aground and was beached near Brancaster, Norfolk. She was on a voyage from Hull, Yorkshire to Brancaster.
Unnamed	United Kingdom	A schooner foundered in Liverpool Bay off the Crosby Lightship ( Trinity House).

== 20 August ==
List of shipwrecks: 20 August 1871
Ship	State	Description
Alpheus	United Kingdom	The steamship collided with the steamship Eaglescliff (United Kingdom) and sank in the Firth of Forth. Her crew were rescued. She was refloated on 22 August and taken in to Alloa, Clackmannanshire. Subsequently repaired and returned to service.
Eiche	Germany	The ship was sighted off Helsingør, Denmark whilst on a voyage from Saint Petersburg, Russia to London, United Kingdom. No further trace presumed foundered with the loss of all hands.
Fortuna	Netherlands)	The lugger collided with the schooner Princess of Wales (United Kingdom) and was abandoned 25 nautical miles (46 km) off Girdle Ness, Aberdeenshire, United Kingdom. Her fifteen crew were rescued by Princess of Wales.
Grace Darling	United Kingdom	The schooner was run ashore at Workington, Cumberland.
Independence	United Kingdom	The schooner was driven ashore and wrecked at Morriscastle, County Wexford. She was refloated.
Venus	Sweden	The ship was driven ashore at Helsingborg. She was on a voyage from Newcastle upon Tyne, Northumberland, United Kingdom to Turku, Grand Duchy of Finland.

== 21 August ==
List of shipwrecks: 21 August 1871
Ship	State	Description
Amy	Leeward Islands	The ship foundered in a hurricane at Saint Kitts.
Anna Bella	Leeward Islands	The ship was wrecked at Saint Kitts.
Annie	United Kingdom	The ship was wrecked at Dieppe Bay, Saint Kitts.
Ariel	United Kingdom	The ship was damaged in a hurricane at Saint Kitts. She was consequently condemned.
Belhaven	United Kingdom	The schooner was driven ashore and wrecked at Portsoy, Aberdeenshire. Her crew were rescued.
Breeze	Leeward Islands	The drogher sank in a hurricane at Saint Kitts.
Catalina	Spain	The schooner was driven ashore and wrecked in a hurricane at Arecibo, Puerto Rico.
Cunningham	Leeward Islands	The sloop was driven ashore in a hurricane at Jamesfort, Antigua.
David Verbist	Belgium	The ship ran aground on the Pearl Rock, off Gibraltar and sank. She was refloated on 31 August and towed in to Gibraltar, where she was condemned.
Dos Amigos	Spain	The schooner was damaged in a hurricane at Saint Thomas, Virgin Islands.
Duke of Wellington	United Kingdom	The barque was wrecked in a hurricane at Saint Thomas. Her crew were rescued. She was on a voyage from Montevideo, Uruguay to a British port.
Elia	Leeward Islands	The drogher was driven out to sea from Saint Kitts in a hurricane. Presumed to have foundered.
Elite	United Kingdom	The ship was damaged at Saint Kitts. She was on a voyage from Saint Kitts to London.
Formosa	United Kingdom	The barque was driven ashore at Queen's Cliff.
Gold Hunter	Leeward Islands	The ship was wrecked at Saint Kitts.
Governor Berg	Leeward Islands	The tug was driven ashore in a hurricane at Saint Thomas.
Grasmere	United Kingdom	The schooner was damaged in a hurricane at Saint Thomas.
Hannah Douglas	United Kingdom	The barque was driven ashore at Antigua.
Italian Hero	United Kingdom	The ship was driven ashore and/or sank at in a hurricane in Hatton's Bay, Antigua.
Julia Carney	United States	The brigantine was blown out to sea from Philipsburg, Saint Martin and foundered 40 nautical miles (74 km) west of Saint Martin. Her crew were rescued by the brig Manita (United Kingdom).
Lady Bird	United Kingdom	The ship was wrecked at Arecibo, Puerto Rico.
Lizzie	United Kingdom	The schooner was damaged in a hurricane at Saint Thomas.
Mary Davidson	United Kingdom	The barque was driven ashore and wrecked in the Jason Islands, Falkland Islands. Her crew survived the wreck, but only three survived to be rescued on 20 September by Florio Paranagua (Chile). Mary Davidson was on a voyage from Liverpool, Lancashire to Guayaquil, Ecuador.
Nautilus	Denmark	The sloop was wrecked in a hurricane at Saint Kitts.
Pioneer	United Kingdom	The ketch was wrecked near Bideford, Devon. Her crew were rescued. She was on a voyage from Cardiff, Glamorgan to Howth, County Dublin.
Prima Donna	United Kingdom	The brig capsized in a hurricane at Nevis and was driven out to sea. She was righted, and put back to Nevis the next day.
Rebecca C. Lane	United States	The schooner was wrecked in a hurricane at Saint Kitts.
Rosehill	United Kingdom	The ship was abandoned in the Dogger Bank and sank. Her crew were rescued by the full-rigged ship Olbers (Sweden). Rosehill was on a voyage from Hartlepool, County Durham to "Heppens".
Sea Dove	United Kingdom	The ship was wrecked at Dieppe Bay, Saint Kitts.
Sonora	France	The steamship was driven ashore in a hurricane at Saint Thomas.
Uncle Ned	United Kingdom	The brigantine was driven ashore in a hurricane at Parham, Antigua. She was later refloated.
Virginia	Leeward Islands	The schooner was driven out to sea from Saint Kitts in a hurricane and foundered with the loss of two of her crew.
Warrior	Leeward Islands	The brig was driven ashore and wrecked in a hurricane at Saint Kitts. Her crew were rescued.
Westwood	United Kingdom	The barque was driven ashore in a hurricane at Hatton's Bay Antigua. She was later refloated.
Zwerver	Netherlands	The schooner was abandoned in the North Sea. Her crew were rescued by the smack Dankbaarheid (Netherlands). Zwerver was on a voyage from Newcastle upon Tyne, Northumberland, United Kingdom to Riga, Russia. She was taken in to the Nieuw Diep in a derelict condition. Also reported as having been towed in to Grimsby.
Two unnamed vessels	Germany	Two barques were wrecked at Fajardo, Puerto Rico.

== 22 August ==
List of shipwrecks: 22 August 1871
Ship	State	Description
Arcadia	United Kingdom	The ship was destroyed by fire 1 nautical mile (1.9 km) off "Tomboretes", Brazil. She was on a voyage from Leith, Lothian to San Francisco, California.
Carolina	United States	The ship was wrecked in a hurricane in the Bahamas. Her crew were rescued.
C. D. Rulre	United States	The ship was wrecked in a hurricane in the Bahamas. Her crew were rescued.
C. V. Williams	United States	The ship was wrecked in a hurricane in the Bahamas. Her crew were rescued.
France	France	The steamship was damaged by fire at Marseille, Bouches-du-Rhône.
Jane	United Kingdom	The schooner ran aground on the Burbo Bank, in Liverpool Bay. She was refloated and towed in to the Sloyne.
Lady Bird	United Kingdom	The ship was wrecked in a hurricane in the Bahamas. Her crew were rescued.
Lord Stanley	United Kingdom	The ship departed from Liverpool, Lancashire for Gaspé, Quebec, Canada. Presumed subsequently foundered. She was reported to have foundered on 17 September 1871.
Nellie Mowe	United Kingdom	The ship was wrecked in a hurricane in the Bahamas. Her crew were rescued.
Wyoming	United Kingdom	The steamship exploded and sank off Point Judith, Rhode Island with the loss of all hands. She was on a voyage from New York to Providence, Rhode Island.

== 23 August ==
List of shipwrecks: 23 August 1871
Ship	State	Description
Alhambra	United States	The steamship ran aground at Charlottetown, Prince Edward Island, Canada. She was refloated with assistance.
Atlas	Germany	The ship was driven ashore at Hela. She was on a voyage from Danzig to Hartlepool, County Durham, United Kingdom. She was later refloated.
Eclipse	United Kingdom	The barque sprang a leak and was beached at Terneuzen, Zeeland, Netherlands. She was on a voyage from Carloforte, Sardinia, Italy to Antwerp, Belgium.
Emilie	United Kingdom	The barque was driven ashore at Hela. Her crew were rescued th Hela Lifeboat. She was on a voyage from Aberdeen to Narva, Russia. She was consequently condemned.
Fox	United Kingdom	The sloop was driven ashore in the River Welland. She was refloated, but was destroyed by fire the next day.
Hooghly	United Kingdom	The ship arrived at South Shields, County Durham from Calcutta, India on fire.
Lion	United Kingdom	The steam wherry ran aground and sank at Sunderland, County Durham. She was on a voyage from Middlesbrough, Yorkshire to Sunderland. She was later refloated and taken in to Sunderland.
Welcome	United Kingdom	The fishing boat collided with the steamship Abana and sank at South Shields.

== 24 August ==
List of shipwrecks: 24 August 1871
Ship	State	Description
Ann	United Kingdom	The schooner was driven ashore and wrecked at Arbroath, Forfarshire. Her crew were rescued by the Arbroath Lifeboat. She was on a voyage from Liverpool, Lancashire to Inverness. She was refloated on 28 August and taken in to Arbroath.
Annette	Norway	The barque was run down and sunk in the Atlantic Ocean (48°49′N 45°12′W) by the steamship Java (United Kingdom) with the loss of eleven of her twelve crew. The survivor was rescued by Java. Annette was on a voyage from Portsmouth, Hampshire, United Kingdom to Miramichi, New Brunswick, Canada.
Dawlies	United Kingdom	The yacht ran aground and was wrecked.
Express	United Kingdom	The steamship was driven ashore on Piel Island, Lancashire. She was on a voyage from Barrow-in-Furness to Liverpool.
Helensbank	Germany	The barque was abandoned in the Atlantic Ocean. Her crew were rescued by Claribel (United Kingdom). Helensbank was on a voyage from Liverpool to New York. She was subsequently boarded by the crew of the schooner Electric ( Canada).
Juniata	United States	The steamship was driven ashore 15 nautical miles (28 km) north of Cape Florida, Florida. She was on a voyage from New Orleans, Louisiana to Philadelphia, Pennsylvania. She was refloated on 29 August and taken in to Key West, Florida.
Lady of the Lune	United Kingdom	The Mersey Flat foundered 1 nautical mile (1.9 km) off Peel. Both crew survived.
Lunefield	United Kingdom	The steamship was wrecked at Cape Roca, Portugal. Her crew were rescued. She was on a voyage from Cardiff, Glamorgan to Trieste.
Osprey	United Kingdom	The paddle tug foundered in the North Sea 2 nautical miles (3.7 km) off Dundee, Forfarshire with the loss of all hands.
Superior	United Kingdom	The schooner foundered off Padstow, Cornwall. Her four crew survived. She was on a voyage from Neath, Glamorgan to St. Ives, Cornwall.
William and Jane	United Kingdom	The schooner collided with the steamship Belgique (Belgium) and sank off Dover, Kent, United Kingdom with the loss of all hands.

== 25 August ==
List of shipwrecks: 25 August 1871
Ship	State	Description
Alcyon	United Kingdom	The ship departed from New York, United States for Londonderry. No further trace, presumed foundered with the loss of all hands.
Anna	Denmark	The ship foundered with the loss of all hands. She was on a voyage from Køge to Newcastle upon Tyne, Northumberland, United Kingdom.
Anna Rose	United Kingdom	The ship was driven ashore and wrecked in Sinclairs Bay. Her crew were rescued.
Charlotte	United Kingdom	The ship was driven ashore at Kilness Point, County Down.
Felix Pensamento	Morocco	The schooner was driven ashore in Bootle Bay. She was on a voyage from Larache to Liverpool, Lancashire, United Kingdom.
J. J. Eckman	Sweden	The steamship ran aground near Thorup, Denmark. Her crew were rescued. She subsequently sank and was declared a total loss.
Ingeborg	Norway	The schooner was driven ashore at "Hafstensund". Her crew were rescued. She was on a voyage from Calais, France to Christiania.

== 26 August ==
List of shipwrecks: 26 August 1871
Ship	State	Description
Aluda	United Kingdom	The ship was driven ashore at "Sebersted". Her crew were rescued. she was on a voyage from Saint Petersburg, Russia to Aberdeen.
Chaturanga	United Kingdom	The barque was wrecked on Neckmansgrund, in the Baltic Sea. Her crew were rescued. She was on a voyage from Blyth, Northumberland to Kronstadt, Russia.
Clara Novello	United Kingdom	The ship ran aground off Corton, Suffolk. She was refloated the next day and resumed her voyage.
Colombia	United Kingdom	The steamship ran aground in the Clyde. She was on a voyage from the Clyde to New York, United States.
Gambia	United Kingdom	The ship departed from São Vicente Island, Cape Verde Islands for Wilmington, Delaware. No further trace, presumed foundered with the loss of all hands.
Mary	United Kingdom	The sloop was abandoned at sea. Her crew were rescued. She was on a voyage from West Wemyss, Fife to Thurso, Caithness.
Menam	United Kingdom	The ship departed from Hong Kong for Yokohama, Japan. No further trace, presumed foundered with the loss of all hands.
Never Despair	United Kingdom	The ship ran aground in the Dardanelles. She was on a voyage from Varna, Ottoman Empire to Falmouth, Cornwall. She was refloated with the assistance of a tug.
Petrel	United Kingdom	The schooner caught fire and was abandoned in the North Sea. Her crew were rescued by Edward Auguste (Belgium). Petrel was on a voyage from Sunderland, County Durham to Thurso, Caithness.
Phœnix	United Kingdom	The Mersey Flat was wrecked in the Hilbre Islands, Cheshire. Her crew were rescued.

== 27 August ==
List of shipwrecks: 27 August 1871
Ship	State	Description
Aber	United Kingdom	The steamship was run down and sunk off Donaghadee, County Down by RMS Prussian (United Kingdom). All on board were rescued. Aber was on a voyage from Donaghadee to Portpatrick, Wigtownshire.
Alcyone	United States	The barque departed from New York for Londonderry, United Kingdom. No further trace, presumed foundered with the loss of all hands.
Aura	Denmark	The schooner was driven ashore in Bovallsfjord. She was on a voyage from Copenhagen to Newcastle upon Tyne, Northumberland, United Kingdom.
Linda	United States	The steamship was driven ashore and wrecked "on Highbridge", near Yarmouth, Nova Scotia, Canada. All on board were rescued. She was on a voyage from Portland to Yarmouth.
Ocean Wave	United Kingdom	The steamboat suffered a boiler explosion and sank in the Mississippi River with the loss of 60 to 70 lives. She was on a voyage from the Fish River to Mobile, Alabama.

== 28 August ==
List of shipwrecks: 28 August 1871
Ship	State	Description
Anna	Denmark	The schooner was driven ashore and wrecked near Lysekil, Sweden with the loss of her captain. She was on a voyage from Køge to Newcastle upon Tyne, Northumberland, United Kingdom.
Bondicar	United Kingdom	The brig was wrecked at Grebbestad, Sweden with the loss of eight of her crew. She was on a voyage from Kronstadt, Russia to London.
Edith	United Kingdom	The ship ran aground off Hellevoetsluis, Zeeland, Netherlands. She was on a voyage from Leith, Lothian to Rotterdam, South Holland, Netherlands.
Harbinger	United Kingdom	The brig was driven ashore on Nidingen, Sweden. She was on a voyage from Newcastle upon Tyne to Gothenburg, Sweden.
Hebe	Flag unknown	The ship was driven ashore on the east coast of Öland, Sweden. She was on a voyage from Riga, Russia to Porto, Portugal.
Jane	United Kingdom	The ship was driven ashore at Bacton, Norfolk.
Margaretta	Germany	The brig was wrecked at the mouth of the St. Johns River. Her crew were rescued. She was on a voyage from Stettin to New York.
Mount Royal, and Richard	United Kingdom; Germany	The ships collided at Bremen and were both severely damaged. They both ran aground, but were both refloated.
Nagasaki	United States	The ship foundered 5 leagues (15 nautical miles (28 km)) north north west of Arranmore, County Donegal, United Kingdom. Her twenty crew survived. She was on a voyage from South Shields, County Durham to Bombay, India.
Nymph	United Kingdom	The brig was wrecked near Lysekil. She was on a voyage from Vyborg, Russia to an English port.
Ocean Bride	United Kingdom	The fishing lugger collided with Twilight (United Kingdom) and was beached on Islay, Inner Hebrides.
St. Thomas Packet	United Kingdom	The ship foundered off Tønsberg, Norway. Her crew were rescued. She was on a voyage from Kronstadt to London.
Times	United Kingdom	The barque was driven ashore near Formby, Lancashire. All seventeen people on board were rescued by the Formby Lifeboat Jessie Knowles ( Royal National Lifeboat Institution). Times was on a voyage from Akyab, Burma to Liverpool, Lancashire. She was later refloated and taken in to Liverpool.
Walters	United Kingdom	The ship was wrecked on the Middelplaat, in the North Sea off the Dutch coast. Her crew were rescued. She was on a voyage from South Shields to Dordrecht, South Holland, Netherlands.

== 29 August ==
List of shipwrecks: 29 August 1871
Ship	State	Description
Collina	United Kingdom	The sloop was destroyed by fire at Padstow, Cornwall. Her crew survived.
Elizabeth Douthwaite	United Kingdom	The ship ran aground at Yeni-Kale, Russia. She was on a voyage from South Shields, County Durham to Kertch, Russia. She was refloated on 1 September.
Figlia Alessandra	Italy	The ship foundered off Peniche, Portugal. She was on a voyage from Cardiff, Glamorgan, United Kingdom to Port Said, Egypt.
Jane	United Kingdom	The Mersey Flat collided with Tynwald ( (United Kingdom of Great Britain and Ireland) Isle of Man and sank. She was on a voyage from Northwich, Cheshire to Liverpool, Lancashire.
London	United Kingdom	The ship was damaged by fire at South Shields, County Durham.
Margaret	United Kingdom	The smack was beached in Sandy Cove Reach, County Cork, where she was wrecked. She was on a voyage from Cork to Berehaven, County Cork.
Mazeppa	United Kingdom	The ship was driven ashore on the Jadder. She was on a voyage from Leith, Lothian to Stavanger, Norway. She was refloated and taken in to Tanager, Denmark in a severely damaged condition.
Mississippi	United Kingdom	The steamship was reported to have been wrecked in a hurricane in the Hatteras Inlet. All on board were rescued. She was on a voyage from New York to New Orleans, Louisiana.
HMS Repulse	Royal Navy	The Bulwark-class battleship ran aground off the Isle of Sheppey, Kent. She was refloated, and was taken in to Sheerness, Kent the next day.
Village Belle	United Kingdom	The barque ran aground in the River Foyle. She was refloated and towed in to Londonderry.

== 30 August ==
List of shipwrecks: 30 August 1871
Ship	State	Description
Canada	United Kingdom	The ship was driven ashore in Saint Helena Sound.
Emmanuel	Norway	The schooner was driven ashore south of Sunderland, County Durham. United Kingdom. She was on a voyage from Troon, Ayrshire, United Kingdom to Sunderland. She was refloated and towed in to Sunderland.
James Davidson	United Kingdom	The ship was driven ashore at "Cape Fedo", Sicily, Italy. She was on a voyage from Euripos, Greece to Glasgow, Renfrewshire. She was refloated and resumed her voyage.
Peter Cracroft	New Zealand	The 19-ton cutter stranded on Great Barrier Island and became a complete wreck.

== 31 August ==
List of shipwrecks: 31 August 1871
Ship	State	Description
Carl Milberg	Sweden	The ship was driven ashore at Ljugarn, Gotland. She was on a voyage from Härnösand to an English port. She was refloated and resumed her voyage.
Carrie Kountz	United States	The steamboat struck a snag and sank in the Scioto River. She was on a voyage from Cairo, Ohio to New Orleans, Louisiana.
Charmer	United Kingdom	The ship ran aground and capsized at Quebec City, Canada. She was on a voyage from Quebec City to the Clyde. She was righted the next day.
Collier	United Kingdom	The steamship struck the quayside at Honfleur, Manche, France whilst avoiding a collision with another vessel and was damaged. She was subsequently taken in to Plymouth, Devon for repairs.
Columbus	Germany	The brigantine was driven ashore on Fanø, Denmark. Her crew were rescued. She was on a voyage from Hamburg to Hartlepool, County Durham, United Kingdom.
Earl of Carlisle	United Kingdom	The ship was wrecked at Lysekil, Sweden. She was on a voyage from Umeå, Sweden to Lowestoft, Suffolk.
Ermandine	Germany	The ship capsized with the loss of all hands. She was on a voyage from Danzig to Newcastle upon Tyne, Northumberland, United Kingdom.
Flora	Germany	The schooner was wrecked near Lysekil, Sweden. Her crew were rescued.
Hilmana	Netherlands	The ship was driven ashore and wrecked at Lysekil. Her crew were rescued.
Johanna	Netherlands	The ship was driven ashore and wrecked at the mouth of the Eider. She was on a voyage from Hartlepool to Newhaven, Sussex, United Kingdom.
Mary	United Kingdom	The ship foundered, according to a message in a bottle washed up at Teignmouth, Devon on 10 September.
Nolstrom	Sweden	The brig was driven ashore and wrecked at Lysekil. Her crew were rescued.
Perche	Italy	The barque was driven ashore at Waterford, United Kingdom. She was on a voyage from Odesa, Russia to Waterford.
Trionjo	Flag unknown	The ship was driven ashore near "Burgos".

== Unknown date ==
List of shipwrecks: Unknown date in August 1871
Ship	State	Description
Abilene	United Kingdom	The brigantine was abandoned in the Atlantic Ocean Her crew took to the boat; the landed on São Miguel Island, Azores on 29 August. She was on a voyage from Lagos, Africa to Falmouth, Cornwall.
Agnes	United Kingdom	The schooner ran aground at Martinique before 26 August.
Alert	Germany	The schooner was abandoned at sea. Her crew were rescued by Earl of Elgin (United Kingdom).
Alice	United Kingdom	The fishing smack was run ashore near the Gull Rock.
Avondale	United Kingdom	The ship departed from Niuzhuang for Hong Kong in early August. No further trace, presumed foundered with the loss of all hands.
British Standard	United Kingdom	The ship was driven ashore at "Biela Serai", Russia before 3 August. She was later refloated and resumed her voyage.
Brunette	France	The brig was wrecked. Her crew were rescued.
Clarissa	United Kingdom	The brig sank in the Mollösund with the loss of nine of her eleven crew. She was on a voyage from Kronstadt, Russia to London. She was refloated in mid-February 1872 and taken in to Lykesund for repairs.
Cognac	France	The ship ran aground near "Tultsha". She was refloated.
Colombo	United Kingdom	The ship was abandoned at sea. At least eleven crew survived. She was on a voyage from Saigon, French Indo-China to Hong Kong.
Commisariat	Flag unknown	The steamship was driven ashore in the Danube before 26 August.
Cornelis	United Kingdom	The ship was driven ashore on the coast of California, United States before 8 August. Her crew were rescued.
Counsellor	United Kingdom	The steamship ran aground on the Moniscar Reef. She was refloated.
Despatch	United Kingdom	The ship ran aground. She was on a voyage from Cardiff, Glamorgan to Constantinople, Ottoman Empire. She was refloated and completed her voyage.
Deux Frères	France	The full-rigged ship was wrecked near "Leckie", on the west coast of Africa.
Dolfijn	Netherlands	The ship was driven ashore on "Gobia Zamba Island". Her crew were rescued. She was on a voyage from Greytown, Nicaragua to Savanilla, United States of Colombia.
Ebenezer	United Kingdom	The ship ran aground on the Kimmeridge Ledge, in the English Channel off the coast of Dorset. She was on a voyage from King's Lynn, Norfolk to Ayr. She was refloated and taken in to Portland, Dorset.
Edmond	Belgium	The ship foundered in the Mediterranean Sea. Her crew were rescued by a British steamship. She was on a voyage from Carloforte, Sardinia, Italy to Antwerp.
Edward and Marie	Netherlands	The ship sank at Hong Kong.
E. F. Dunbar	United States	The ship was abandoned in the Atlantic Ocean before 20 August.
Eendraght	Flag unknown	The ship was wrecked at "Chittepee". Her crew were rescued.
Emma	United Kingdom	The ship ran aground on the Long Key Shoals. She was on a voyage from Pensacola, Florida, United States to Liverpool, Lancashire. She was refloated and resumed her voyage.
Erdmandine	Germany	The ship capsized with the loss of all hands.
Esther	France	The ship was lost off Noirmoutier, Vendée. Her crew were rescued.
Exchange	United States	The fishing schooner was lost at Cow Bay. Crew saved.
Firth of Clyde	United Kingdom	The ship was driven ashore at Saint Pierre, Miquelon on 23 or 24 August. She was on a voyage from Montreal, Quebec, Canada to London. She broke up on 26 November.
Frederick VII	Germany	The ship foundered before 29 August with the loss of two of her crew. She was on a voyage from Greenland to Harburg.
Gebroeders Visser	Netherlands	The ship was wrecked. Her crew were rescued. She was on a voyage from the Vlie to Bergen, Norway.
George	United Kingdom	The brig was wrecked at Fjällbacka, Sweden with the loss of all but her captain.
Georgiana	United Kingdom	The ship was abandoned off Cape Horn, Chile. She was on a voyage from Porthcawl, Glamorgan to Valparaíso, Chile.
Hans	Germany	The ship sank with the loss of a crew member. She was on a voyage from Ningbo, China to Hong Kong.
Helma	Spain	The ship was wrecked. She was on a voyage from a Baltic port to Spain.
Henrika	Sweden	The ship was wrecked at Gothenburg between 26 and 29 August. Her crew were rescued.
Hoffnung	Germany	The ship ran aground at Roresand, Norway. She was on a voyage from Lillesand, Norway to "Hoyer".
Holywood	United Kingdom	The ship was driven ashore on Naissaar, Russia. She was on a voyage from Vyborg, Grand Duchy of Finland to Hartlepool, County Durham. She was refloated and taken in to Riga, Russia.
Ionian Belle	United States	The ship caught fire at Zakynthos and was scuttled. She was on a voyage from Charleston, South Carolina to Zakynthos.
Iris	United Kingdom	The ship was lost in the Cuba Lake. She was on a voyage from Kingstown, County Dublin to Charleston, South Carolina, United States.
Jaime	United Kingdom	The ship was wrecked at Aguadilla, Puerto Rico.
Jane Sawyer	United Kingdom	The schooner was driven ashore at Strone Point, Argyllshire. She was on a voyage from the Clyde to Easdale, Argyllshire.
Jantje	Netherlands	The ship was wrecked. She was on a voyage from Harlingen, Friesland to a Norwegian port.
Jason	Netherlands	The ship ran aground in the Hellegat. She was on a voyage from Hellevoetsluis to Batavia, Netherlands East Indies. She was refloated.
Jesmond	United Kingdom	The steamship was driven ashore. She was refloated and taken in to Galaţi, Ottoman Empire.
John O. Baker	United States	The ship ran aground in the Crosby Channel. She was on a voyage from Saint John, New Brunswick, Canada to Liverpool. She was refloated and towed in to Liverpool in a leaky condition with the assistance of three tugs.
Katherine	United Kingdom	The steamship foundered off the Isle of May, Fife.
Leander	United Kingdom	The steamship foundered between 24 and 26 August with the loss of all 21 people on board. She was on a voyage from Copenhagen, Denmark to Amsterdam, North Holland, Netherlands.
Lightening	United Kingdom	The ship ran aground at the mouth of the Rangoon River. She was on a voyage from Calcutta, India to Dunkirk, Nord.
Lonstrop	Sweden	The schooner was wrecked at Gothenburg between 26 and 29 August. Her crew were rescued.
Lorley	United Kingdom	The steamship was driven ashore at Sestos, Ottoman Empire. She was on a voyage from Naples, Italy to Constantinople. She was refloated and resumed her voyage.
Margaretha	Germany	The schooner was driven ashore at Gothenburg, Sweden. She was on a voyage from New York to Königsberg. She was refloated and towed in to Gothenburg.
Marianne	Flag unknown	The ship was damaged by fire at San Francisco, California, United States.
Marie	Germany	The jacht sank. She was on a voyage from Königsberg to Trondheim, Norway.
Marigo	Flag unknown	The ship collided with another vessel and sank in the Danube.
Marion	United Kingdom	The ship was driven ashore on Bodie Island, North Carolina, United States. She was on a voyage from Liverpool, Lancashire to Charleston, South Carolina, United States. Marion was later refloated and towed in to Norfolk, Virginia, United States in a severely leaky condition.
Mexican	United Kingdom	The ship foundered with the loss of a crew member. She was on a voyage from Shantou to Hong Kong.
Minerva	United Kingdom	The ship ran aground. She was on a voyage from Troon, Ayrshire to Galway. she was refloated and taken in to Galway in a leaky condition.
Nancy	United Kingdom	The ship was driven out to sea from Hong Kong and was lost with her captain.
Nelson	United Kingdom	The ship was driven ashore in Trinity Bay and was abandoned by her crew. She was on a voyage from Liverpool, Lancashire to Quebec City, Canada.
Nereid	United Kingdom	The steam yacht was driven ashore at "Ross Glass". She was refloated and taken in to Belfast, County Antrim.
Oberst Lieutenant von Sulstorff	Germany	The ship ran aground at Terneuzen, Zeeland, Netherlands.
Octavie	France	The ship was driven ashore on the coast of Sierra Leone and was severely damaged.
Oscar	United Kingdom	The ship was wrecked on Saaremaa, Russia. She was on a voyage from Antwerp to Vyborg.
Paria	Canada	The brigantine foundered in the Atlantic Ocean. She was on a voyage from Lockeport, Nova Scotia to Trinidad.
Pauline and Ermida	Flag unknown	The ship was driven ashore at "Apeshill". She was on a voyage from Marseille, Bouches-du-Rhône, France to La Guaira, Venezuela. She was refloated and towed in to Gibraltar in a leaky condition.
Ranger	United Kingdom	The smack was wrecked at Rhyl, Denbighshire.
Regente	United Kingdom	The ship ran aground and was severely damaged at Ardrossan, Ayrshire.
Result	United Kingdom	The ship foundered. She was on a voyage from Lagos to Hamburg, Germany.
Riga	United Kingdom	The steamship was driven ashore of Fårö, Sweden. She was on a voyage from Kronstadt to Leith
Roline Marie	United Kingdom	The ship sank at Hong Kong.
Saga	United Kingdom	The barque was driven ashore on the Swash She was refloated on 27 August and resumed her voyage.
Sagua	(Spain) Cuba	The ship was driven ashore at Havana. She was refloated and put back to Havana.
Sauveur	France	The ship was driven ashore on the coast of Sierra Leone.
Sarah Smith	United Kingdom	The ship ran aground off Barbuda. She was on a voyage from Saint Lucia to Falmouth, Cornwall. She was refloated and taken in to Antigua.
Sharon	United Kingdom	The ship ran aground in the Uruguay River. She was refloated.
Slogger	Denmark	The brig was abandoned in the North Sea before 6 August. She was on a voyage from Arendal, Norway to an English port. Slogger was towed in to Grimsby, Lincolnshire, United Kingdom in a waterlogged condition.
Sophie	Belgium	The ship was wrecked. She was on a voyage from Hudiksvall, Sweden to Cádiz, Spain.
Speculation	United Kingdom	The ship ran aground near Rotterdam. She was on a voyage from Vyborg to Antwerp. She was refloated with assistance.
S. S. Bickmore	United States	The schooner was wrecked at the mouth of the St. Johns River before 23 August.
Stefano	Russia	The ship was driven ashore and wrecked at "Genitachek".
St. Jacques	United Kingdom	The ship was driven ashore and damaged at Havre de Grâce, Seine-Inférieure, France.
Sully	United Kingdom	The ship ran aground in the River Plate. She was on a voyage from the River Plate to Antwerp.
Velox	Germany	The ship was driven ashore near Marstrand, Sweden. Her crew were rescued. She was on a voyage from Danzig to Antwerp, Belgium.
Vesta	United Kingdom	The ship ran aground at Little River Head. She was on a voyage from Newhaven, Sussex to Saint John's, Newfoundland Colony.
Vistula	United Kingdom	The ship sank at Hong Kong.
Vulcan	Sweden	The ship was driven ashore at Sando. Her crew were rescued.
Waters	United Kingdom	The brig was wrecked on the Middelplaat, in the North Sea off the Dutch coast. Her crew were rescued. She was on a voyage from South Shields to Dordrecht, South Holland, Netherlands.
Water Lily	United States	The steamship foundered off Edisto Island, South Carolina before 23 August. She was on a voyage from Charleston, South Carolina to Edisto Island.
Wild Hunter	United States	The ship ran aground at Havre de Grâce. She was on a voyage from New Orleans, Louisiana to Havre de Grâce.
