= List of shipwrecks in February 1861 =

The list of shipwrecks in February 1861 includes ships sunk, foundered, grounded, or otherwise lost during February 1861.

== 1 February ==
List of shipwrecks: 1 February 1861
Ship	State	Description
Angelina	France	The ship struck a rock and was wrecked off the coast of Cuba with the loss of all but three of her crew. She was on a voyage from Havre de Grâce, Seine-Inférieure to Havana, Cuba.
Augusta	United Kingdom	The ship ran aground on the Kentish Knock. She was on a voyage from Huelva, Spain to Newcastle upon Tyne, Northumberland. She was refloated and taken in to Ramsgate, Kent in a leaky condition.
Ayres Quay	United Kingdom	The ship ran aground at "Ourdell", Somme, France.
Eliza and Charlotte	Bremen	The ship struck the quayside at Bremerhaven and was damaged. She was on a voyage from Santiago de Cuba, Cuba to Bremerhaven.
Fekea	Kingdom of Hanover	The ship was sunk by ice in the Weser. Her crew were rescued. She was on a voyage from Sunderland, County Durham, United Kingdom to Bremen.
Mary	United Kingdom	The ship was driven ashore at Sheringham, Norfolk.
Octavius	United Kingdom	The ship departed from New York, United States for London. No further trace, presumed foundered with the loss of all hands.
Pearl	United Kingdom	The ship struck a rock off Thorpeness, Suffolk and was damaged. She was on a voyage from Marseille, Bouches-du-Rhône, France to Wells-next-the-Sea, Norfolk. She put in to Lowestoft, Suffolk in a leaky condition.
Peegrant	France	The ship was driven ashore at North Somercotes, Lincolnshire, United Kingdom. She was on a voyage from Calais to Middlesbrough, Yorkshire, United Kingdom. She was refloated with assistance from another vessel.

== 2 February ==
List of shipwrecks: 2 February 1861
Ship	State	Description
Agatha	Netherlands	The brig ran aground in the Eider at "Eitzenloch". She was on a voyage from Trieste to Hamburg. She was refloated on 4 January and towed in to Cuxhaven.
Celine	France	The lugger was wrecked near Figueira da Foz, Portugal. Her crew were rescued. She was on a voyage from Cardiff, Glamorgan, United Kingdom to Cádiz, Spain.
Christian Hendrik	Sweden	The brig was driven ashore at Camperduin, North Holland, Netherlands. She was on a voyage from Newcastle upon Tyne, Northumberland, United Kingdom to Málaga, Spain and Genoa, Kingdom of Sardinia. She had been refloated by 18 February and taken in to the Nieuw Diep.
Dominica	United Kingdom	The ship ran aground at Waterford. She was on a voyage from Waterford to Cardiff, Glamorgan. She was refloated with assistance from a steamship and resumed her voyage.
Isabella	United Kingdom	The ship was wrecked on "Dogan Island", in the Sea of Marmora. She was on a voyage from Brăila, Ottoman Empire to Falmouth, Cornwall. She was later refloated and taken in to Constantinople, where she arrived on 27 February.
James	United Kingdom	The brig ran aground in the River Foyle.
Johanna	Kingdom of Hanover	The galiot ran aground on the Minser Olde-Vager Platte, in the North Sea. Her crew were rescued. She was on a voyage from Hartlepool, County Durham to "Steinhauserseil".
Lucy	United Kingdom	The brig ran aground on the Newcombe Sand, in the North Sea off the coast of Suffolk. She was refloated and resumed her voyage.
Parton	United Kingdom	The brig was wrecked on the Arklow Banks, in the Irish Sea off the coast of County Wicklow. She was on a voyage from Whitehaven, Cumberland to Kingstown, County Dublin and Cardiff, Glamorgan.
St. Michael	France	The chasse-marée was driven ashore on the Île du Croix, Corsica.

== 3 February ==
List of shipwrecks: 3 February 1861
Ship	State	Description
Caledonia	United Kingdom	The brig was driven ashore and wrecked at Formby, Lancashire. She was on a voyage from St. John's, Newfoundland, British North America to Liverpool, Lancashire.
Caliste	Bremen	The brig was driven ashore in the Weser at Weddewarden. She was on a voyage from Newcastle upon Tyne, Northumberland, United Kingdom to Bremen.
Elizabeth	United Kingdom	The ship ran aground on the Patch Sand, in the North Sea off the coast of Norfolk. She was refloated, took on extra hands and resumed her voyage.
Fountain	United Kingdom	The brig ran aground at Exmouth, Devon.
Luna	Bremen	The galiot ran aground in the Weser at Bremerhaven. She was on a voyage from Hartlepool, County Durham to Bremerhaven.
Mermaid	United Kingdom	The ship departed from Bombay, India for London. No further trace, presumed foundered with the loss of all hands.
Reub White	United States	The sidewheel paddle steamer was stranded in the Harvey Canal in Louisiana.

== 4 February ==
List of shipwrecks: 4 February 1861
Ship	State	Description
Delphin	Rostock	The ship was driven ashore and wrecked at the Nakkehead Lighthouse, Denmark. Her crew were rescued. She was on a voyage from Newcastle upon Tyne, Northumberland, United Kingdom to rostock.
Fredericke	Denmark	The schooner was wrecked on North Uist, Outer Hebrides, United Kingdom with the loss of all hands.
Germania	United Kingdom	The ship ran aground on the Burbo Bank, in Liverpool Bay. She was on a voyage from Belfast, County Antrim to Liverpool, Lancashire. She was refloated and taken into Liverpool.
Harlequin	United Kingdom	The ship collided with another vessel and sank in the North Sea off Aldeburgh, Suffolk. She was on a voyage from London to Sunderland, County Durham.
Jane Lovett	United Kingdom	The barque was driven onto the Shepody Flats, off Saint John, New Brunswick, British North America. Her crew were rescued. She was on a voyage from Belfast, County Antrim to Saint John.
Thomas	United Kingdom	The schooner was run down by a brig and sank in the North Sea 9 nautical miles (17 km) north north west of Cromer, Norfolk. Her crew were rescued by Little Helen (United Kingdom). Thomas was on a voyage from Hartlepool, County Durham to Blakeney, Norfolk.

== 5 February ==
List of shipwrecks: 5 February 1861
Ship	State	Description
Charles	United Kingdom	The brig was wrecked on the Corton Sands, in the North Sea off the coast of Suffolk. Her seven crew were rescued by the brig Sela (United Kingdom). Charles was on a voyage from Sunderland, County Durham to London.
Emilie	Prussia	The schooner was driven ashore on the west coast of Denmark.
Johannes Welbach	Denmark	The ship was driven ashore at Ystad, Sweden. She was on a voyage from Messina, Kingdom of Sardinia to a Baltic port.
Malakoff	United Kingdom	The barque was severely damaged at Hendon, County Durham when a rake of railway wagons ran away and overran the coal drops. Five loaded open wagons fell 30 feet (9 m) onto the deck of the ship.
St. George	United Kingdom	The ship struck Newland Island, off Padstow, Cornwall and sank. Her crew were rescued. she was on a voyage from Port Isaac to Padstow.

== 6 February ==
List of shipwrecks: 6 February 1861
Ship	State	Description
Anne Lawson	United Kingdom	The ship departed from Cobija, Chile for Liverpool, Lancashire. No further trace, presumed foundered with the loss of all hands.
Foyle	United Kingdom	The ship ran aground on the Gunfleet Sand, in the North Sea off the coast of Essex. She was on a voyage from Helsingør, Denmark to London, or from London to Hull, Yorkshire. She was refloated on 8 February and taken in to Harwich, Essex in a leaky condition.
Manchester	United Kingdom	The brigantine was lost at the entrance to the Strangford Lough with the loss of all hands. She was on a voyage from Whitehaven, Cumberland to Dublin.
Marianne	United Kingdom	The brig was driven ashore at Demerara, British Guiana. She was on a voyage from London to Demerara.
Marie Adelaide	France	The brig was wrecked near Saint-Nazaire, Loire-Inférieure. Her crew were rescued.
Menam	United Kingdom	The barque was abandoned in the Atlantic Ocean. Her crew were rescued by the barque Bahia (France). Menam was on a voyage from Manila, Spanish East Indies to London.
My Choice	United Kingdom	The schooner was driven ashore in Loch Indaal. She was refloated on 26 February and taken in to Bowmore, Islay.
Paulina	France	The brigantine was driven ashore at Bridport, Dorset, United Kingdom. She was on a voyage from Angles, Vendée to Hull.
Queen	United Kingdom	The ship struck a sunken wreck in the English Channel off Beachy Head, Sussex. She put in to Ramsgate, Kent in a leaky condition.
Sarah A. Bell	(United Kingdom of Great Britain and Ireland) British North America	The ship was driven ashore at Fethard-on-Sea, County Wexford. Her crew were rescued. She was on a voyage from Boston, Massachusetts, United States to Liverpool, Lancashire.
Victorine Louise	France	The lugger was driven ashore at Calais. She was on a voyage from Boulogne, Pas-de-Calais to Saint-Valery-en-Caux, Seine-Inférieure. She was refloated the next day.
Vindolana	United Kingdom	The brig was wrecked at Breaksea Point, Glamorgan. Her crew were rescued. She was on a voyage from New York to Gloucester.

== 7 February ==
List of shipwrecks: 7 February 1861
Ship	State	Description
Edith	United Kingdom	The ship departed from Safi, Morocco for a British port. No further trace, presumed foundered with the loss of all hands.
H. M. Stanwood	United States	The fishing schooner sank on the Georges Bank, or off Gloucester, Massachusetts in a gale. Lost with all 8 crew.
Susan Young	United States	The fishing schooner sank on the Georges Bank, or off Gloucester, Massachusetts in a gale. Lost with all 9 crew.
Vocalist	United Kingdom	The ship foundered in the Atlantic Ocean (11°00′N 40°36′W). Her 24 crew were rescued by the barque Civilian (United States). Vocalist was on a voyage from Callao, Peru to Cork.
White Swallow	United States	The fishing schooner sank in a gale on the Georges Bank. Lost with all 9 crew.

== 8 February ==
List of shipwrecks: 8 February 1861
Ship	State	Description
Agnes	United Kingdom	The schooner ran aground on the South Bull, in the Irish Sea. Her crew were rescued.
Ann	United Kingdom	The schooner was wrecked on the Barngera Rocks, off the coast of County Down. Her five crew were rescued by the Balbriggan Lifeboat. She was on a voyage from Ayr to Dundalk, County Louth.
Caroline	United Kingdom	The ship was wrecked at Kingstown, County Dublin. Her crew were rescued.
City of St. Andrews	United Kingdom	The ship was driven ashore at Point of Ayre, Isle of Man with the loss of two of her crew.
Clyde	United Kingdom	The schooner was driven ashore and wrecked at Kingstown. Her six crew were rescued. She was on a voyage from Bideford, Devon to Cork.
Eleanor	United Kingdom	The ship was driven ashore near Donaghadee. She was on a voyage from Ardrossan, Ayrshire to Newcastle, County Down.
Elizabeth	United Kingdom	The ship struck Colt Island, County Dublin and sank with the loss of all hands.
Ellen	United Kingdom	The ship was wrecked at Dublin. Her crew were rescued. She was on a voyage from Ardrossan, Ayrshire to Dublin.
Gazelle	United Kingdom	The schooner was wrecked at Laytown, County Meath with the loss of all on board. She subsequently floated off and was towed in to Drogheda, County Louth on 18 February in a capsized condition.
Gypsey	United Kingdom	The smack was driven and wrecked at Skerries with the loss of her captain. Survivors were rescued by the Skerries Lifeboat.
Helen	United Kingdom	The ship was wrecked at Kingstown. Her crew were rescued.
Hero	United Kingdom	The brig was wrecked at Kingstown. Her crew were rescued.
Helena	Sweden	The full-rigged ship was driven ashore at Ramsgate, Kent, United Kingdom. She was on a voyage from Newcastle upon Tyne, Northumberland to London, United Kingdom. She was refloated.
Industry	United Kingdom	The schooner was wrecked at Kingstown with the loss of four of her five crew. She was on a voyage from Whitehaven to Kingstown.
Isabella	United Kingdom	The schooner was driven ashore at Donaghadee, County Down. She was on a voyage from Ayr to Fleetwood, Lancashire.
King Olive	United Kingdom	The smack was wrecked at Kingstown. Her crew were rescued.
Lady Falkland	United Kingdom	The ship was driven ashore at Gibraltar. She was on a voyage from Cardiff, Glamorgan to Gibraltar. She was refloated on 2 March and towed in to Gibraltar.
Leon	United Kingdom	The ship was driven ashore at Kingstown.
Leven	United Kingdom	The steamship was driven ashore and wrecked at Dublin. Her crew were rescued. She was on a voyage from Whitehaven, Cumberland to Dublin.
Lewis Charles	United Kingdom	The ship departed from Llanelly, Glamorgan for Penzance, Cornwall. No further trace, presumed foundered with the loss of all hands.
Lima	United Kingdom	The brig foundered off Lamlash, Isle of Arran with the loss of all hands. She was on a voyage from Harrington, Cumberland to Dublin.
Lively	United Kingdom	The schooner was driven ashore and wrecked at Kingstown. Her crew were rescued.
Lune	United Kingdom	The brig foundered in the Irish Sea with the loss of all hands.
Maid of the Mist	United Kingdom	The schooner struck the quayside at Howth, County Dublin and sank. She was on a voyage from Troon, Ayrshire to Dublin.
Martha	United Kingdom	The collier, a brigantine, was driven ashore and wrecked at Ballyferris Point, County Down with the loss of all hands.
Mary	United Kingdom	The brig was driven ashore at Kingstown. Her seven crew were rescued.
Mary	United Kingdom	The schooner was driven ashore and wrecked at Greystones, County Wicklow with the loss of all four crew.
Mary Ann	United Kingdom	The schooner was wrecked on the Reevans Rock, off the coast of County Dublin with the loss of all five crew.
Mary Anne	United Kingdom	The ship was wrecked at Howth with the loss of all hands.
Moses	United Kingdom	The brigantine was wrecked at Kingstown. Her four crew were rescued.
Nairnshire	United Kingdom	The schooner was driven ashore at Whitehouse, County Antrim and was abandoned by her crew. She was on a voyage from Ardrossan, Ayrshire to Liverpool, Lancashire.
Neptune	United Kingdom	The brig was wrecked at Kingstown with the loss of six of her seven crew. She was on a voyage from Whitehaven to Kingstown.
Onyx	United Kingdom	The ship was wrecked at Kingstown. She was on a voyage from Kingstown to Falmouth, Cornwall.
Operint	United Kingdom	The schooner was driven ashore and wrecked at Kingstown. Her crew were rescued.
Ranger	United Kingdom	The ship was wrecked at Kingstown. Her crew were rescued.
Robert Seymour	United Kingdom	The brig was driven ashore at Greystones. Her three crew were rescued.
Royal Sovereign	United Kingdom	The smack was wrecked at Kingstown. Her crew were rescued.
Scylla	United Kingdom	The schooner sank at Youghal, County Cork. She was on a voyage from Youghal to Bristol, Gloucestershire.
Seaflower	United States	The ship was damaged by fire in the Sloyne. She was on a voyage from Liverpool, Lancashire, United Kingdom to New York. The fire was extinguished with assistance from HMS Majestic (Royal Navy) and the tugs Sampson and Universe (both United Kingdom)
Sibyl	United Kingdom	The ship was driven ashore at the Point of Ayre. Her crew survived. She was on a voyage from Ayr to Fleetwood, Lancashire.
Sir William Wallace	United Kingdom	The schooner was driven ashore and wrecked at Skerries.
Sultan	United Kingdom	The brigantine was driven ashore at Donaghadee. She was on a voyage from Belfast, County Antrim to Maryport, Cumberland. She was later refloated and resumed her voyage, arriving at Maryport on 26 February.
Sylph	France	The schooner was wrecked at Dublin. Her crew were rescued. She was on a voyage from Bordeaux, Gironde to Newry, County Antrim, United Kingdom.
The Clans	United Kingdom	The schooner was wrecked at Kingstown. Her crew were rescued.
Two Sisters	(United Kingdom of Great Britain and Ireland) Gibraltar	The schooner was wrecked in Tangier Bay. Her crew were rescued.
Village Maid	United Kingdom	The schooner ran aground and capsized on the Dutchman's Bank, off Beaumaris, Anglesey. She was on a voyage from Ardrossan, Ayrshire to Fleetwood, Lancashire. Her four crew were rescued the next day by the Penmon Lifeboat.
Wanderer	United Kingdom	The brig was driven ashore and sank at Kingstown. Her crew were rescued. She was on a voyage from Whitehaven to Dublin. Wanderer was refloated on 26 March.
Wanderer	United Kingdom	The schooner was wrecked at Kingstown. Her crew were rescued.
Wave	United Kingdom	The schooner foundered in the North Sea 9 nautical miles (17 km) north west of Sunderland with the loss of three of her five crew. Survivors were rescued by the schooner Snowdrop (United Kingdom).
Workington	United Kingdom	The ship was wrecked at Kingstown. Her crew were rescued.

== 9 February ==
List of shipwrecks: 9 February 1861
Ship	State	Description
Active	United Kingdom	The ship was driven ashore at Grimsby, Lincolnshire. She was on a voyage from Port Mulgrave, Yorkshire to Newcastle upon Tyne, Northumberland. She was refloated on 15 February and taken in to Grimsby.
Agnes	United Kingdom	The schooner was driven ashore at Scarborough, Yorkshire. Her crew were rescued by the Scarborough Lifeboat. She was on a voyage from Grangemouth, Stirlingshire to Dunkirk, Nord.
Agnes	United Kingdom	The schooner was driven ashore at Drogheda, County Louth. Her crew were rescued. She was on a voyage from Preston, Lancashire to Drogheda.
Albert	United Kingdom	The ship was driven ashore and wrecked at Middleton, County Durham. Her crew were rescued.
Albion	United Kingdom	The ship was wrecked near Ramsey, Isle of Man. Her crew were rescued She was on a voyage from Whitehaven, Cumberland to Ramsey.
Alexander Brandt	Russia	The tug struck a sunken rock in the Sound of Islay and was beached, She was on a voyage from Riga to Belfast, County Antrim, United Kingdom.
Alfred	United Kingdom	The ship was wrecked near Ramsey. Her crew were rescued. She was on a voyage from Whitehaven to Ramsey.
Allington, and Mary	United Kingdom	The sloop Allington collided with Mary off the coast of Cornwall and was abandoned. Her crew were rescued by a brigantine. Mary was severely damaged. She put in to Penzance.
Apollo	Netherlands	The galiot was driven ashore and wrecked at Redcar, Yorkshire, United Kingdom with the loss of all hands.
Atalanta	United Kingdom	The barque was driven ashore and wrecked at Middleton.
Athena	Norway	The barque was severely damaged in a gale at Lisbon, Portugal.
Atlas	United Kingdom	The ship was driven ashore and wrecked at West Hartlepool, County Durham.
Aurora	United Kingdom	The ship was wrecked at Skerries, County Dublin.
Barbara	United Kingdom	The brig was driven ashore and wrecked at Middleton. She was refloated in late February and taken in to Hartlepool.
Belina	United Kingdom	The brig was driven ashore and damaged at Middleton. Her crew were rescued by the Hartlepool Lifeboat. She was on a voyage from Aberdeen to Hartlepool.
Betsey	United Kingdom	The Mersey Flat ran aground on the East Hoyle Bank, in Liverpool Bay. Her crew were rescued by the Liverpool Lifeboat. Betsey was subsequently towed in to Liverpool by the tug Conqueror (United Kingdom).
Bosphorus	United Kingdom	The barque was driven ashore and wrecked at Middleton. Her crew were rescued.
Brazilian Packet	United Kingdom	The ship was driven ashore and wrecked at Whitby.
Broadwood	United Kingdom	The brig was driven ashore near Wisbech, Cambridgeshire. She was on a voyage from Blyth, Northumberland to London==.
Calus	United Kingdom	The ship was severely damaged at Kingstown.
Cæsar	United Kingdom	The schooner was wrecked on the Herd Sand, in the North Sea off the coast of County Durham. Her crew were rescued by the South Shields Lifeboat. She was on a voyage from West Hartlepool to Whitstable, Kent. Cæsar was refloated on 12 March and taken in to South Shields.
Catherine and Ellen	United Kingdom	The ship was wrecked near Ramsey. Her crew were rescued. She was on a voyage from Whitehaven to Ramsey.
Celine	France	The ship was driven ashore and wrecked at Seaton Carew, County Durham.
Chalonge	France	The schooner was driven ashore and wrecked at Middleton. Her crew were rescued. She was on a voyage from Newcastle upon Tyne to a Spanish port.
Charm	United Kingdom	The schooner struck the Castle Rock and was holed. She was on a voyage from Southampton, Hampshire to Cardiff, Glamorgan. She was refloated and put back to Dartmouth, Devon in a severely leaky condition.
Christopher	United Kingdom	The ship was driven ashore and wrecked at Hartlepool.
Cicely	United Kingdom	The brig was abandoned off the coast of County Durham. Her crew were rescued by the Hartlepool Lifeboat. She was on a voyage from Sunderland to Southampton. She was subsequently driven ashore and wrecked at Middleton.
City of Lucknow	United Kingdom	The East Indiaman was wrecked at Bangor, County Down with the loss of one of the 28 people on board. Survivors were rescued by the Bangor Lifeboat. She was on a voyage from Glasgow, Renfrewshire to Calcutta, India. The wreck was refloated on 11 June and beached at "Richfort".
Clara	Prussia	The barque was driven ashore at Whitby, Yorkshire, United Kingdom. Her crew were rescued. She was on a voyage from Newcastle upon Tyne to Madeira.
Claret	United Kingdom	The brig was driven ashore and wrecked at Seaton Carew. Her crew were rescued by the Shields Lifeboat. She was on a voyage from South Shields, County Durham to Boulogne, Pas-de-Calais, France. Claret was refloated on 27 or 28 February and taken in to Whitby.
Clyde	United Kingdom	The ship was driven ashore and wrecked at Seaton Carew.
Clyde	United Kingdom	The ship was driven ashore and wrecked at Hull, Yorkshire. Her crew were rescued. She was on a voyage from Runcorn, Cheshire to Cork.
Comtesse de Fregeville	France	The steamship was driven ashore at Hartlepool.
Conrad	United Kingdom	The ship was driven ashore and wrecked at Sunderland, County Durham. Her crew were rescued.
Constitution	United Kingdom	The brigantine struck a sunken wreck in the North Sea off the coast of Yorkshire. She was on a voyage from Hartlepool to Montevideo, Uruguay. She put back to Hartlepool in a sinking condition.
Corinna	United Kingdom	The brig collided with the brig Williamson (United Kingdom) and was beached at Seaton Carew, She was on a voyage from Great Yarmouth, Norfolk to Newcastle upon Tyne.
Cyrus	United Kingdom	The barque was driven ashore and wrecked at Hartlepool, County Durham. Her crew were rescued by the Hartlepool Lifeboat. She was on a voyage from South Shields to London.
Dahlia	United Kingdom	The ship struck a rock in the Farne Islands, Northumberland and sank. Her crew were rescued.
Delta	United Kingdom	The ship was driven ashore at Hartlepool. She was later refloated.
Désiree	France	The schooner struck a sunken wreck and was beached at Middleton. Her crew were rescued. She was refloated on 18 February and found to be severely damaged.
Dr. Winterbottom	United Kingdom	The brig was driven ashore and wrecked at Middleton. Her crew were rescued. She was on a voyage from South Shields to Mistley, Essex.
Duke of Wellington	United Kingdom	The brig was driven ashore at Knockingen, County Louth with the loss of her captain. There were at least four survivors. She was on a voyage from Troon, Ayrshire to Dundalk, County Louth.
Duncan	United Kingdom	The schooner was driven ashore and wrecked at West Hartlepool.
Dunscombe	United Kingdom	The brig was driven ashore and wrecked at Middleton. Her crew were rescued. She was on a voyage from South Shields to London.
Earl	United Kingdom	The schooner was driven ashore at Dundalk.
Eclipse	United Kingdom	The schooner was driven ashore and wrecked at Hartlepool. Her crew were rescued by rocket apparatus.
Eleanor	United Kingdom	The brig was driven ashore and wrecked at Middleton. She was refloated on 10 March and taken in to North Shields.
Eliza	United Kingdom	The Maryport-registered brigantine was driven ashore and wrecked at Wicklow with the loss of two of her four crew.
Eliza	United Kingdom	The brig was beached at Moville, County Donegal. She was on a voyage from Ardrossan, Ayrshire to Londonderry.
Eliza and Ellen	United Kingdom	The schooner was driven ashore and wrecked at Middleton. She was later refloated.
Elizabeth	United Kingdom	The schooner collided with the barque Frederica (United Kingdom) in the Sloyne and was consequently beached at Tranmere, Cheshire with assistance from the tug Conqueror (United Kingdom).
Elizabeth and Ellen	United Kingdom	The ship was driven ashore and wrecked at Hartlepool.
Elizabeth and Mary	United Kingdom	The ship was driven ashore and wrecked at Whitby.
Elizabeth and Sarah	United Kingdom	The brig was driven ashore and wrecked at Middleton.
Ellen and Mary	United Kingdom	The schooner collided with a ship off the Mull of Galloway, Argyllshire. She was on a voyage from Glasgow to Fleetwood, Lancashire. She was consequently beached on the White House Bank, in the Belfast Lough.
Ellen Oliver	United Kingdom	The barque was driven ashore and wrecked at Middleton. Her crew were rescued. She was on a voyage from Newcastle upon Tyne to Cartagena, Spain.
Ellora	United Kingdom	The brig was driven ashore at Middleton.
Emilée Victorine	France	The schooner was severely damaged in a gale at Lisbon.
Endeavour	United Kingdom	The brig was driven ashore at Bray, County Wicklow. Her five crew were rescued.
Eustace	United Kingdom	The brig was driven ashore and wrecked at Redcar. Her crew were rescued. She was on a voyage from Sunderland to London. She was refloated in late February and taken in to Middlesbrough.
Eracles	Greece	The barque was lost off Cape Trafalgar, Spain with the loss of two of her crew. She was on a voyage from Swansea, Glamorgan, United Kingdom to Syros.
Express	United Kingdom	The brig was driven ashore and wrecked at Middleton with the loss of all but one of those on board.
Express	United Kingdom	The schooner was driven ashore and wrecked at Hartlepool. All on board were rescued.
Favourite	United Kingdom	The barque was driven ashore and wrecked at Warham, Norfolk. Her crew were rescued, but nine people were drowned when a Blakeney boat capsized whilst going to their rescue. She was on a voyage from Hartlepool to Torre del Mar, Spain.
Favourite	United Kingdom	The fishing smack was driven ashore and wrecked at Killiney, County Dublin. Her three crew were rescued.
Fortitude	United Kingdom	The schooner was driven ashore and wrecked at Hartlepool.
Fowlis	United Kingdom	The schooner was driven ashore and wrecked at South Shields with the loss of two of her six crew. Survivors were rescued by the Lifeboat Tyne (United Kingdom). The lifeboat Providence (United Kingdom) was severely damaged attempting a rescue.
Friendship	United Kingdom	The brig was driven ashore and wrecked at Seaton Carew.
Gamma	United Kingdom	The schooner was driven ashore and wrecked at Whitby. Her crew were rescued. She was on a voyage from Newcastle upon Tyne, Northumberland to London. She was refloated on 15 February and taken in to Whitby.
George and Mary	United Kingdom	The schooner struck the Ferrier Sand, in the North Sea. She was refloated but was found to be leaky and was run ashore at Snettisham, Norfolk. George and Mary was on a voyage from Middlesbrough, Yorkshire to Milton Regis, Kent.
Gipsy	United Kingdom	The smack sank at Colt Island, County Dublin. Her four crew were rescued by the Skerries Lifeboat.
Graces	United Kingdom	The brig was driven ashore and wrecked in Robin Hoods Bay. Her crew were rescued by a fishing coble. She was on a voyage from London to Seaham, County Durham. Graces was refloated on 27 or 28 February and towed in to Whitby.
Gratitude	United Kingdom	The ship was wrecked near Ramsey. Her crew were rescued. She was on a voyage from Whitehaven to Ramsey.
Guyana	United Kingdom	The ship was wrecked on the Carry Rocks, off the coast of County Wexford. Her nineteen crew were rescued by the Carnsore Lifeboat. She was on a voyage from the Clyde to Saint Kitts.
Harriet and Sarah	United Kingdom	The ship was wrecked near Ramsey. Her crew were rescued. She was on a voyage from Whitehaven to Ramsey.
Heline	United Kingdom	The brigantine was wrecked at Kingstown. Her crew were rescued.
Herbert	United Kingdom	The ship was driven ashore at West Hartlepool.
Hull	United Kingdom	The brig was driven ashore and wrecked at Middleton.
Indus	United Kingdom	The collier, a brig, ran aground on the Herd Sand and was wrecked. Her crew were rescued by the lifeboat Northumberland (United Kingdom).
Integrity	United Kingdom	The brig was driven ashore at and wrecked Middleton. Her crew were rescued by the Shields lifeboat. She was on a voyage from North Shields, County Durham to London.
Isabella	United Kingdom	The brig was driven ashore and wrecked at Middleton. She was later refloated.
Isis	United Kingdom	The ship was driven ashore and wrecked at Middleton.
Jane and Ellen	United Kingdom	The schooner was driven ashore at Dundalk.
Joanne d'Arc	France	The ship was wrecked on the Black Halls. Her crew were rescued. She was on a voyage from Caen, department to Newcastle upon Tyne.
John	United Kingdom	The ship was driven ashore and wrecked at Hartlepool. Her crew were rescued.
John and Anne	United Kingdom	The ship was driven ashore and wrecked at Sandsend, Yorkshire. Her crew were rescued. She was on a voyage from London to Sunderland. John and Anne was refloated on 27 or 28 February and taken in to Whitby.
John Joseph Richardson	United Kingdom	The ship was wrecked at the entrance to the Strangford Lough. Her crew were rescued. She was on a voyage from Maryport, Cumberland to Kircubbin, County Down.
Johns	United Kingdom	The ship was driven ashore on the coast of County Durham. Her crew were rescued.
Julia	United Kingdom	The ship was driven ashore and wrecked at Hartlepool.
Juno	United Kingdom	The brig was driven ashore on the coast of County Durham. Her crew were rescued by a fishing coble.
Juno	United Kingdom	The brig was driven ashore and wrecked in Robin Hoods Bay. Her crew were rescued. She was on a voyage from London to South Shields. Juno was refloated on 27 February and taken in to South Shields.
Jura	United Kingdom	The ship was driven ashore and wrecked at Hartlepool.
Kelso	United Kingdom	The full-rigged ship struck the Longstone Rock, off the coast of County Durham and sank with the loss of one of her twenty crew. She was on a voyage from Sunderland or South Shields to Hong Kong.
Kingston	United Kingdom	The schooner was driven ashore at Blakeney, Norfolk. Her crew were rescued. She was on a voyage for Hartlepool to Plymouth, Devon. She was refloated on 1 March.
Kite	United Kingdom	The ship was run into by Martin Luther (United Kingdom) and was severely damaged in the River Mersey. She was taken in to Liverpool, Lancashire for repairs.
Koh-i-Noor	United Kingdom	The barque was driven ashore at Tod Point, County Durham. Her crew were rescued. She was on a voyage from South Shields to London. Koh-i-Noor had become a wreck by 13 February.
Lady Daff	United Kingdom	The schooner was driven ashore and wrecked at West Hartlepool.
Lady de Crespigny	United Kingdom	The brig was driven ashore and wrecked at Redcar with the loss of all hands. She was on a voyage from Hartlepool to Colchester, Essex.
Lady Helen	United Kingdom	The schooner foundered in the Irish Sea 4 nautical miles (7.4 km) north east of Holyhead, Anglesey. Her crew were rescued by the schooner Nieve (United Kingdom). Lady Helen was on a voyage from Ardrossan to Liverpool.
Laing	United Kingdom	The brig was driven ashore and wrecked at Middleton. She was on a voyage from Sunderland to London.
Legatus	United Kingdom	The brig was driven ashore and wrecked at Middleton. Her crew were rescued by the Shields Lifeboat. She was refloated on 14 February and taken in to Hartlepool.
Leonidas	United Kingdom	The ship was driven ashore and wrecked at Hartlepool. She was later refloated.
Magna Carta	United Kingdom	The ship was wrecked at Hull.
Magna Charta	United Kingdom	The barque was driven ashore at Seaton Carew. Her crew were rescued. She was refloated on 10 March and taken in to North Shields.
Manlovice	United Kingdom	The barque was driven ashore and wrecked at Middleton.
Margaret	United Kingdom	The ship was driven ashore and wrecked at Hartlepool.
Margaret	(United Kingdom of Great Britain and Ireland) Guernsey	The ship was driven ashore and wrecked at Hartlepool.
Margaret	United Kingdom	The schooner was driven ashore at Wisbech. She was on a voyage from Seaham to Wisbech.
Margaret Ann	United Kingdom	The schooner was driven ashore and wrecked at Skerries. Her five crew were rescued by the Skerries Lifeboat.
Marie Adele	France	The schooner was driven ashore at Middleton. She was on a voyage from Caen to Blyth. She was refloated on 22 February and towed in to Hartlepool.
Marie Clotilde	France	The schooner was driven ashore and wrecked at Redcar. Her crew were rescued. She was on a voyage from Saint-Malo, Ille-et-Vilaine to Hartlepool. She was refloated on 25 February and towed in to Middlesbrough.
Mariner	United Kingdom	The ship was wrecked at South Shields.
Mary Ann	United Kingdom	The brig was driven onto the wreck of Cyrus (United Kingdom) at Hartlepool.
Mary Ann	United Kingdom	The ship was wrecked on the Bulseaden Rocks, off the coast of County Dublin with the loss of all hands. She subsequently came ashore at Skerries.
Mary and Ann	United Kingdom	The ship was driven ashore at Filey. Her crew were rescued. She was on a voyage from Seaham to London.
Marys	United Kingdom	The brig was driven ashore and wrecked at Redcar. Her crew were rescued. She was on a voyage from Sunderland to the River Thames.
Matharee	United Kingdom	The brig was driven ashore and wrecked at Middleton. Her crew were rescued.
Mayflower	United Kingdom	The brig was wrecked on the East Gar Sand, off the mouth of the River Tees. Her eight crew were rescued by the Seaton Carew Lifeboat.
Meldon	United Kingdom	The ship was presumed to have sunk of the cost of County Durham with the loss of all hands. She was on a voyage from Grimsby to South Shields.
Mellna	United Kingdom	The ship was severely damaged in a gale at Lisbon when a Norwegian barque drove into her.
Memnon	United Kingdom	The brig was driven ashore and wrecked at Seaton Carew. Her crew were rescued.
Memnon	United Kingdom	The ship was driven ashore and wrecked at Whitby. Her crew were rescued by the Whitby Lifeboat.
Merchant	United Kingdom	The schooner was driven ashore and wrecked at Whitby with the loss of a crew member. She was on a voyage from Sunderland to Maldon, Essex.
Miles Barton	United Kingdom	The transport ship was wrecked on a reef 20 nautical miles (37 km) east of Struys Bay with the loss of one life. Survivors were rescued on 12 March by HMS Cyclops (Royal Navy).
Miner	United Kingdom	The ship was driven ashore and wrecked at Hartlepool.
Minerva	United Kingdom	The brig ran aground on the Herd Sand, in the North Sea off the coast of County Durham and was wrecked. Her crew were rescued by the South Shields Lifeboat Providence (United Kingdom). Minerva was on a voyage from London to Seaham, County Durham.
Mohawk	United Kingdom	The brig was driven ashore at Cleethorpes, Lincolnshire. She was on a voyage from South Shields to London. She was refloated and taken in to Grimsby.
Nanteos	United Kingdom	The schooner was driven ashore at Abersoch, Caernarfonshire. She was on a voyage from Liverpool to Bristol, Gloucestershire.
Nephews	United Kingdom	The ship was driven ashore at Grimsby. She was on a voyage from Lowestoft, Suffolk to South Shields.
New Draper	United Kingdom	The brig was driven ashore at Wicklow. Her eight crew were rescued by the Wicklow Lifeboat.
Nimrod	(United Kingdom of Great Britain and Ireland) Isle of Man	The lugger was abandoned off Castletown. Her three crew were rescued by the Castletown Lifeboat.
Norman	United Kingdom	The ship was driven ashore and wrecked at Hartlepool.
Odessa	United Kingdom	The brig was driven ashore and wrecked at Redcar. Her crew were rescued. She was on a voyage from Sunderland to London. Odessa was refloated on 27 or 28 February and taken in to Whitby.
Olave	United Kingdom	The ship was wrecked at Kingstown. Her crew were rescued.
Orbit	United Kingdom	The ship was driven ashore and wrecked at Seaton Carew. Her crew were rescued.
Patriot	United Kingdom	The schooner was driven ashore and wrecked at Seaton Carew.
Patriot	United Kingdom	The ship was wrecked at Hull.
Perseverance	United Kingdom	The schooner was wrecked on the Velvet Sand, in the Irish Sea off the coast of County Dublin with the loss of all but her captain from her six crew. She was on a voyage from Ardrossan, Ayrshire to Dublin.
Phœbe	United Kingdom	The ship was wrecked near Ramsey. Her crew were rescued. She was on a voyage from Whitehaven to Ramsey.
Plenty	United Kingdom	The brig was driven ashore and wrecked at Seaton Carew. Her crew were rescued. She was on a voyage from South Shields to London.
Princess	United Kingdom	The ship was driven ashore and wrecked at Hartlepool. Her crew were rescued.
Promise	United Kingdom	The brig was driven ashore and wrecked at Seaton Carew. Her crew were rescued.
Providence	United Kingdom	The brig was driven ashore and wrecked at Middleton. Her eight crew were rescued by the Seaton Carew Lifeboat. She was on a voyage from Warkworth, Northumberland to Boulogne, Pas-de-Calais, France.
Rambler	United Kingdom	The brig was driven ashore and wrecked at Seaton Carew. Her crew were rescued. She was on a voyage from South Shields to London.
Reliance	(United Kingdom of Great Britain and Ireland) Guernsey	The ship foundered off the coast of County Durham with the loss of all hands.
Richard Foley	United Kingdom	The brig was driven ashore and wrecked at Middleton.
Rimswell	United Kingdom	The full-rigged ship was wrecked at Middleton. Her crew were rescued by the Hartlepool Lifeboat.
Rising Sun	United Kingdom	The brig was driven ashore and wrecked at the Heugh Lighthouse, Hartlepool with the loss of all but two of her crew. One of the survivors was rescued by the schooner Express (United Kingdom).
Robin, and Sister	United Kingdom	Robin drove into Sister at Lisbon during a gale. Both vessels were severely damaged.
Robino	United Kingdom	The brig was driven ashore at Middleton.
Roe	United Kingdom	The schooner was driven ashore at Whitby. Her crew were rescued by the Whitby Lifeboat. She was on a voyage from Dundee, Forfarshire to Newcastle upon Tyne.
Roman Empress	United Kingdom	The ship was driven ashore and wrecked at Marske-by-the-Sea, Yorkshire. Her ten crew were rescued by the Redcar Lifeboat. Roman Empress was on a voyage from South Shields to Naples, Kingdom of the Two Sicilies. She was refloated in late February and taken in to South Shields.
Rose	United Kingdom	The ship was driven ashore at Ryhope, County Durham. Her crew were rescued. She was refloated in early March.
Rowland Hill	United Kingdom	The brig was wrecked at Wicklow with the loss of three of her four crew.
Royal William	United Kingdom	The brig ran aground and sank at West Hartlepool, County Durham.
Ruby	United Kingdom	The Hartlepool-registered ship ran aground at Whitby and was wrecked.
Ruby	United Kingdom	The South Shields-registered ship ran aground at Whitby.
Runswell	United Kingdom	The full-rigged ship was driven ashore and wrecked at Middleton. Her crew were rescued by the Shields Lifeboat. She was on a voyage from South Shields to Cartagena, Spain.
Ruby	United Kingdom	The brig was driven ashore and wrecked at Seaton Carew. Her crew were rescued.
Sarah	United Kingdom	The ship was wrecked near Ramsey. Her crew were rescued. She was on a voyage from Whitehaven to Ramsey.
Sarah	United Kingdom	The ship was driven ashore at West Hartlepool.
Sarah Ann	United Kingdom	The collier ran aground on the Herd Sand. Her crew were rescued by the lifeboat Providence (United Kingdom). Sarah Ann was on a voyage from London to North Shields or vice versa. She capsized on 12 February and was wrecked. She was later refloated.
Sarah Anne	United Kingdom	The schooner was driven ashore and wrecked at Middleton. Her crew were rescued. She was later refloated.
Savanna	United Kingdom	The schooner was driven ashore and wrecked at Seaton Carew with the loss of a crew member. Survivors were rescued by the Seaton Carew Lifeboat. She was on a voyage from Hartlepool to Caen, Calvados, France.
Sicily	United Kingdom	The brig was driven ashore and wrecked at Middleton.
Small	United Kingdom	The schooner was driven ashore between Balbriggan and Skerries. Her crew were rescued.
Spray	United Kingdom	The brig was driven ashore at Middleton.
Sprite	United Kingdom	The brig foundered off the Longston Rock with the loss of all hands.
Spring	United Kingdom	The brig was driven ashore and wrecked at Middleton.
Starling	United Kingdom	The ship was presumed to have foundered off the coast of County Durham with the loss of all hands.
St. George	United Kingdom	The brig was driven ashore and wrecked at Skerries. Her crew were rescued.
Success	United Kingdom	The ship was wrecked near Ramsey. Her crew were rescued. She was on a voyage from Whitehaven to Ramsey.
Susannah	United Kingdom	The ship was driven ashore and wrecked at Hartlepool.
Telegraph	United Kingdom	The schooner was driven ashore at Dundalk.
Thomas	United Kingdom	The ship was driven ashore at West Hartlepool.
Thomas Ryde	United Kingdom	The ship was driven ashore and wrecked at Hartlepool.
Tom's Whim	United Kingdom	The schooner was wrecked on the Briggs Rocks with the loss of all on board.
Tonquin	United States	The barque foundered off Wicklow Head, County Wicklow. All twelve people on board were rescued. She was on a voyage from the Clyde to Santos.
Treaty	United Kingdom	The Yorkshire Billyboy ran aground on the Herd Sand. Her crew were rescued by a number of lifeboats. She was refloated on 12 February and towed in to South Shields.
Trefan	United Kingdom	The schooner was driven ashore at Porthor, Caernarfonshire. Her crew were rescued. She was on a voyage from Garston, Lancashire to Pwllheli, Caernarfonshire.
Tribune	United Kingdom	The brig was driven ashore and wrecked at Whitby with the loss of a crew member. Survivors were rescued by the Whitby Lifeboat. She was on a voyage from Newcastle upon Tyne to Brixham, Devon.
Tyne Packet	United Kingdom	The sloop was driven ashore at Aberdeen. Her three crew were rescued by the Aberdeen Lifeboat. She was on a voyage from Newcastle upon Tyne, Northumberland to St Andrews, Fife.
Una	United Kingdom	The brig was driven ashore and wrecked at Middleton. Her crew were rescued by the Shields Lifeboat. She was on a voyage from South Shields to London. She was refloated in early March.
Union	United Kingdom	The brig was driven ashore and wrecked at Middleton with the loss of a crew member. Survivors were rescued by the Shields Lifeboat. She was on a voyage from South Shields to Rochester, Kent.
Utility	United Kingdom	The brig was driven ashore at Whitby. Her crew were rescued by the Whitby Lifeboat. Utility was on a voyage from Folkestone, Kent to Newcastleu upon Tyne. She was refloated on 25 February and taken in to Whitby.
Venice	United Kingdom	The schooner was driven ashore and wrecked at West Hartlepool.
Venus	United Kingdom	The brig was driven ashore at Seaton Carew.
Victory	United States	The 670-ton clipper was lost near Cape Henry, Virginia, Confederate States of America. She was on a voyage from Callao, Peru to the Hampton Roads, Virginia.
Vittoria	Malta	The full-rigged ship was abandoned in the Bay of Biscay and foundered. Her nineteen crew were rescued by the schooner Juliana (Denmark). Vittoria was on a voyage from Cardiff to Malta.
Wansbeck	United Kingdom	The brig foundered off Hartlepool with the loss of all hands.
Wardell	United Kingdom	The ship was driven ashore and wrecked at Hartlepool.
Waverley	United States	The ship was assisted in to Castlehaven, County Cork, United Kingdom in a waterlogged condition. She was on a voyage from New York to Havre de Grâce, Seine-Inférieure, France.
Weardale	United Kingdom	The brig was driven ashore and wrecked at Middleton. Her crew were rescued. She was later refloated.
Welcome Home	United Kingdom	The brig sank at West Hartlepool. Her crew were rescued by the Hartlepool Lifeboat. She was on a voyage from Seaham to London.
William	United Kingdom	The brig was driven ashore and wrecked at Middleton. She was refloated on 29 March and towed in to North Shields.
William	United Kingdom	The schooner was driven ashore west of the mouth of the Voryd River, Denbighshire. All five people on board were rescued by the Rhyl Lifeboat.
William and Mary	(United Kingdom of Great Britain and Ireland) Guernsey	The brig was driven ashore and wrecked at Middleton. Her crew were rescued by the Hartlepool Lifeboat. She was on a voyage from Newcastle upon Tyne to Saint-Malo, Ille-et-Vilaine, France.
William and George	United Kingdom	The ship was driven ashore and wrecked at Hartlepool. She was later refloated.
William Campbell	United Kingdom	The brigantine was driven ashore at Wicklow with the loss of all but her captain.
William George	United Kingdom	The ship was driven ashore and wrecked at Middleton.
William Gregory	United Kingdom	The brig was driven ashore at Middleton.
Williams	United Kingdom	The brig was driven ashore at Middleton.
Willkommen	Danzig	The barque ran aground at Hartlepool. She was on a voyage from South Shields to Porto, Portugal. She was refloated with assistance from a tug and taken in to Hartlepool.
Yacht	United Kingdom	The schooner was driven ashore and wrecked at Middleton.
Yalet	United Kingdom	The ship was driven ashore at West Hartlepool.
Zephyr	United Kingdom	The ship foundered off the coast of County Durham with the loss of a crew member.
Unnamed	Flag unknown	The schooner foundered off Hartlepool with the loss of all hands.
Unnamed	Flag unknown	The schooner capsized off Hartlepool. Her crew survived.
Unnamed	Flag unknown	The schooner foundered off the Longstone Rock with the loss of all hands.
Unnamed	Flag unknown	The schooner was wrecked on the Longstone Rock.
Unnamed	Flag unknown	The schooner was wrecked on the Longstone Rock. Her crew took to a boat. The West Hartlepool and Seaton Lifeboats went to their aid.
Unnamed	United Kingdom	The brig was driven ashore and wrecked at "Killoghter", County Dublin with the loss of one of her five crew.
Unnamed	United Kingdom	The ship was wrecked at Kilcool, Ireland with the loss of five of her six crew.
Unnamed	United Kingdom	The ship was wrecked. Her five crew were rescued by the Arklow Lifeboat.

== 10 February ==
List of shipwrecks: 10 February 1861
Ship	State	Description
Ant	United Kingdom	The schooner was driven ashore at Douglas, Isle of Man. She was on a voyage from Wigtown to Lancaster, Lancashire. She was refloated and taken in to Douglas.
Charmer	(United States) Confederate States of America	The 667-ton sidewheel paddle steamer burned at Lauderdale, Louisiana, with the loss of five lives. She was on a voyage from Vicksburg, Mississippi to New Orleans, Louisiana.
Christ	United Kingdom	The ship was driven ashore and wrecked at Hartlepool, County Durham.
Coral	United Kingdom	The schooner was wrecked near Castletown, Isle of Man. Her crew were rescued. She was on a voyage from Bangor, Caernarfonshire t Limerick.
Cumberland	United Kingdom	The brig was abandoned in the North Sea off Whitby. Her crew were rescued by Pride (United Kingdom). Cumberland was on a voyage from South Shields, County Durham to London.
Daniel	United Kingdom	The schooner was last sighted on this date. Presumed subsequently foundered with the loss of all hands. A boat washed up near Pwllheli, Caernarfonshire on 4 March.
Dove	United Kingdom	The ship was driven ashore and wrecked at Hartlepool.
Duke of Wellington	United Kingdom	The ship was driven ashore and wrecked near Drogheda, County Louth with the loss of all but three of her crew. She was on a voyage from Troon, Ayrshire to Dundalk, County Louth.
Eliza	United Kingdom	The pilot boat was driven ashore and wrecked at St Albans Head, Dorset.
Elizabeth	United Kingdom	The schooner was driven ashore at Hoylake, Lancashire. Her crew were rescued by the Hoylake, Liverpool and Magazines Lifeboats.
Eliza Cornish	United Kingdom	The schooner was driven against the quayside and damaged at Dover, Kent. She was on a voyage from Rouen, Seine-Inférieure to Sunderland, County Durham.
Express	United Kingdom	The ship was driven ashore at Grimsby, Lincolnshire.
Flora	United Kingdom	The schooner was driven ashore at Whitby. Her crew were rescued by the Whitby Lifeboat.
Frithiof	Sweden	The schooner was driven ashore between "Linnhamn" and Malmö. She was on a voyage from Hartlepool to Malmö.
George IV	United Kingdom	The ship ran aground on the Eclat Bank, in the English Channel off the coast of Seine-Inférieure, France, and sank. Her crew were rescued. She was on a voyage from Newcastle upon Tyne, Northumberland to Caen, Calvados, France.
Hodge	United Kingdom	The schooner was driven ashore and wrecked east of Blakeney, Norfolk. Her crew were rescued. She was on a voyage from Plymouth, Devon to Hartlepool, County Durham.
John Trucks	United Kingdom	The ship was holed by ice and sank at Philadelphia, Pennsylvania, United States with the loss of two of her crew. She was on a voyage from Liverpool to Philadelphia. John Trucks was refloated on 8 June, but again sank whilst being taken in to port.
Lizzie	United Kingdom	The ship struck the Coal Rock, Anglesey and was beached at Holyhead. She was on a voyage from Barrow-in-Furness, Lancashire to Glasgow, Renfrewshire. She was refloated on 7 March and taken in to Holyhead, Anglesey.
Memnon	United Kingdom	The ship was driven ashore at Whitby. Her crew were rescued by the Whitby Lifeboat.
Pegasus	Kingdom of Hanover	The galeas was driven ashore and wrecked near Schönberg, Prussia. She was on a voyage from Glasgow to Kiel Prussia.
Providence	United Kingdom	The brig was driven ashore north of Seaton Carew, County Durham. Her eight crew were rescued by the Seaton Carew Lifeboat. She was on a voyage from Rochester, Kent to Hartlepool.
Providence	United Kingdom	The ship was driven ashore at Chapel St. Leonards, Lincolnshire. She was refloated on 27 February and taken in to Grimsby.
Quarters, or Quintus	United Kingdom	The ship was driven ashore and wrecked at Hartlepool. She was later refloated.
Quickstep	United Kingdom	The schooner was discovered derelict in the Atlantic Ocean. She was on a voyage from New York, United States to Saint John, New Brunswick, British North America. She was towed in to Boston, Massachusetts, United States, where she arrived on 20 February. Four dead crew were discovered on board when the ship was pumped out.
Sir William Wallace	United Kingdom	The brig was driven ashore at Ryhope, County Durham. Her crew were rescued by rocket apparatus. She was refloated in early March.
Thomas and Joseph	United Kingdom	The brig was driven ashore and sank at Sunderland. She was on a voyage from South Shields to Sunderland. She was refloated the next day, and was towed in to South Shields on 17 February.
Uranie	United Kingdom	The brig was driven ashore and wrecked at Whitby. Her crew were rescued.
William	United Kingdom	The schooner was driven ashore near Rhyl, Denbighshire. Her five crew were rescued by the Rhyl Lifeboat.
William	United Kingdom	The schooner was driven ashore at Hoylake. Her crew were rescued by the Hoylake, Liverpool and Magazines Lifeboats.
Whitby Lifeboat	United Kingdom	The lifeboat capsized whilst going to the aid of Merchant (United Kingdom) with the loss of twelve of her thirteen crew.

== 11 February ==
List of shipwrecks: 11 February 1861
Ship	State	Description
Agnes	United Kingdom	The schooner was driven ashore and wrecked at Kingstown, County Dublin. Her crew were rescued.
Amanda	France	The schooner was wrecked on a reef near Hindsholm, Denmark with the loss of three of her crew.
Annette	Kingdom of Hanover	The derelict galiot was taken in to Grimsby, Lincolnshire, United Kingdom by the smack Pledge (United Kingdom). Annette was on a voyage from Middlesbrough, Yorkshire, United Kingdom to Emden.
Aunt Letty	United States	The 303-ton sternwheel paddle steamer struck a snag and sank at Beram Island.
Blanche	United Kingdom	The ship was lost 3 nautical miles (5.6 km) north of Arklow, County Wicklow with the loss of a crew member.
Catherine	United Kingdom	The ship departed from Milford Haven, Pembrokeshire for Skibbereen, County Cork. No further trace, presumed foundered with the loss of all hands.
Cornelia	Netherlands	The steamship ran aground on the Vlaakte, off the coast of Zeeland.
Driver	United Kingdom	The ship ran aground on the Smithwick Sand. She was on a voyage from Blyth, Northumberland to London. She was refloated and put in to Grimsby in a sinking condition.
Eliza	United Kingdom	The schooner was wrecked at St. Bride's Head, County Wicklow with the loss of three of her five crew.
Emma Maria	Netherlands	The schooner was driven ashore near "Gaarelevstrand". She was on a voyage from Apenrade, Denmark to Swansea, Glamorgan, United Kingdom.
Euphrosyne	France	The schooner foundered in the Irish Sea. Her crew were rescued. She was on a voyage from Bordeaux, Gironde to Preston, Lancashire, United Kingdom.
Gazelle	United Kingdom	The ship foundered in the Irish Sea. Wreckage from the ship washed ashore at Layton, County Dublin.
George Seymour	United Kingdom	The ship was driven ashore at "the Murrough", County Wicklow with the loss of one of her six crew.
Gierdina Harmina	Netherlands	The galiot was driven ashore and wrecked at Robin Hoods Bay, Yorkshire, United Kingdom with the loss of all five crew. She was on a voyage from Sunderland, County Durham to Harwich, Essex, United Kingdom.
Ida	(Russian Empire) Grand Duchy of Finland	The ship was driven ashore on Hindsholm. She was on a voyage from Skælskør, Denmark to an English port.
Ingeborg	Sweden	The ship was driven ashore on Hindsholm. She was on a voyage from Korsør, Denmark to an English port.
Johanna Thomeuse	Denmark	The schooner was driven ashore near Løkken-Vrå.
Johannes	Denmark	The ship was driven ashore on Hindsholm. She was on a voyage from Rønne to and English port.
John and Eleanor	United Kingdom	The ship was driven ashore near Dundalk, County Louth. Her crew were rescued.
Mary	United Kingdom	The schooner was driven ashore north of Balbriggan, County Dublin.
Mary Drapers	United Kingdom	The brig was wrecked at Wicklow. Her eight crew were rescued.
Quapaw	United States	The 245-ton sternwheel paddle steamer struck a snag and sank in the Arkansas River at Little Rock, Arkansas.
Sheridan	United Kingdom	The ship ran aground and was wrecked at "Dynholmen". Her crew were rescued. She was on a voyage from Dundee, Forfarshire to Gothenburg, Sweden.
Sir Allan McNab	United Kingdom	The brigantine was driven ashore at Gorey, County Wexford. Her five crew were rescued.
St. George	United Kingdom	The brig was driven ashore north of Balbriggan.
William	United Kingdom	The brig sank at Arklow. Her five crew were rescued by the Aklow Lifeboat.
Unnamed	United Kingdom	The collier, a brig, was lost off "Migen Head", County Wicklow.

== 12 February ==
List of shipwrecks: 12 February 1862
Ship	State	Description
Alexander Brandt	United Kingdom	The brig struck the Black Rock, in the Sound of Islay and was damaged. She was consequently beached at Bowmore, Islay, United Kingdom. Her crew were rescued. She was on a voyage from Riga to Belfast, County Antrim, United Kingdom.
Aurora	Denmark	The ship was driven ashore on the coast of Denmark. Her crew were rescued.
Camilla	Denmark	The schooner was driven ashore by ice in a river. She was on a voyage from an English port to Holbæk.
Cedar Rapids	United States	The 131-ton sternwheel paddle steamer struck a snag and sank in the Arkansas River at Douglas Landing, Arkansas.
City of St. Andrews	United Kingdom	The ship was wrecked on the Isle of Man with the loss of two of her crew. She was on a voyage from the Clyde to Ramsey, Isle of Man.
Dunkeld	United Kingdom	The ship struck a rock in the River Tay and was holed. She put back to Perth.
Frederick Hansen	Denmark	The schooner foundered off Ulstrup. Her crew were rescued. She was on a voyage from an English port to Kalundborg.
Geymar	Norway	The ship was driven ashore and wrecked on "Smorholmen". Her crew were rescued. She was on a voyage from Odesa to Trondheim. She was consequently condemned.
Georgio	Greece	The brig was wrecked at Livorno, Kingdom of Sardinia.
John and Mary	United Kingdom	The brig foundered in the English Channel 50°00′N 2°20′W with the loss of all hands. A message in a bottle washed up at Portsmouth, Hampshire on 25 February giving this information.
Louise	United Kingdom	The schooner was driven ashore at Tarpoint, Kirkcudbrightshire. She was refloated and towed in to Whitehaven, Cumberland in a waterlogged condition.
Louisa	United Kingdom	The steamship was driven ashore at Morriscastle, County Wexford. She was on a voyage from Glasgow, Renfrewshire to Waterford.
Metropolis	United Kingdom	The steamship sank off the Hermitage Rocks, Jersey, Channel Islands. All on board were rescued. She was on a voyage from Southampton, Hampshire to Jersey.
Narragaugus	United States	The fishing schooner went ashore at St. Mary's, Nova Scotia, near Guysborough, Nova Scotia and was lost. Crew saved.
Royal	Prussia	The ship was driven ashore and wrecked on Anholt, Denmark. Her crew were rescued. She was reported to be on a voyage from Gloucester, United Kingdom to Messina, Sicily.
Velocipede	United Kingdom	The brig was driven ashore and wrecked on Nantucket Island, Massachusetts, United States. All on board were rescued. She was on a voyage from Cienfuegos, Cuba to Halifax, Nova Scotia, British North America.
Vigilant	United Kingdom	The schooner was wrecked at the mouth of the Rio Grande. Her crew were rescued. She was on a voyage from Cádiz, Spain to the Rio Grande.
W. H. Jenkins	(United Kingdom of Great Britain and Ireland) British North America	The ship was wrecked on "Bango Island", Maine, United States. Her crew were rescued. She was on a voyage from Ardrossan, Ayrshire to Portland, Maine.
William Cory	United Kingdom	The steamship was driven ashore 9 nautical miles (17 km) north of Otranto, Kingdom of the Two Sicilies. She was refloated the next day and subsequently sailed for Malta.

== 13 February ==
List of shipwrecks: 13 February 1861
Ship	State	Description
Dania	Denmark	The schooner was driven ashore between Mariagerfjord and Hurup. Her crew were rescued.
Diana	Netherlands	The ship ran aground on the Schiel Hoek. She was on a voyage from Rotterdam, South Holland to Nantes, Loire-Inférieure, France.
Lyra	United Kingdom	The paddle steamer was wrecked on the Oyster Bank, in the Irish Sea off the coast of Lancashire. Her 26 crew, and her passengers were rescued by the steamships Adjutant and Prince of Wales (both United Kingdom). Lyra was on a voyage from Belfast, County Antrim to Morecambe, Lancashire.
M. A. Herrera	United States	The brig ran aground on the Hedge Fence Vineyard Sandbank. She was on a voyage from Buenos Aires, Argentina to Boston, Massachusetts. She was refloated the next day and found to be leaky.
Marietta	United Kingdom	The ship struck the Kedges Rocks, off the coast of County Cork. She was on a voyage from Demerara, British Guiana to Queenstown, County Cork. She put in to Skibbereen, County Cork.
Rose	France	The schooner was wrecked near Le Conquet, Finistère. Her crew were rescued. She was on a voyage from Sunderland, County Durham, United Kingdom to Mortagne-sur-Gironde, Gironde.
Syria	United Kingdom	The steamship was driven ashore and sank at Fleetwood, Lancashire. All on board were rescued. She was on a voyage from Belfast, County Antrim to Morecambe, Lancashire.

== 14 February ==
List of shipwrecks: 14 February 1861
Ship	State	Description
Adelaide	(United Kingdom of Great Britain and Ireland) Guernsey	The brig was driven ashore and wrecked 5 nautical miles (9.3 km) south of Campbeltown, Argyllshire. Her crew were rescued. She was on a voyage from Guernsey to Troon, Ayrshire. She was refloated on 28 March and taken in to Ardrossan, Ayrshire.
Eleni	Greece	The brig foundered 15 nautical miles (28 km) east of Sardinia. She was on a voyage from Trieste to London, United Kingdom.
James	United Kingdom	The brig collided with the steamship James Dixon (United Kingdom) and was consequently beached on the Dortwick Sand, in the North Sea off the coast of County Durham.
Ocean Guide	United Kingdom	The barque was abandoned in the Atlantic Ocean. Her crew were rescued by Carolina Agnes (United Kingdom). Ocean Guide was on a voyage from Newport, Monmouthshire to Galveston, Texas, Confederate States of America.
Sappemeer	Netherlands	The ship was driven ashore and wrecked between Castletownshend and Glandore, County Cork, United Kingdom with the loss of all hands.
Sprite	United Kingdom	The ship sprang a leak and foundered 20 nautical miles (37 km) west north west of The Lizard, Cornwall. Her crew survived. She was on a voyage from Sunderland, County Durham to Bordeaux, Gironde, France.
Thorley	United Kingdom	The brig sprang a leak off Whitby, Yorkshire whilst of a voyage from Hartlepool, County Durham to London. She put back to Hartlepool, where she ran aground and was damaged further.
Tiverton	United Kingdom	The barque was driven ashore and wrecked on Dahoma Point, County Mayo. She was on a voyage from Troon, Ayrshire to Limerick.
Traube	Rostock	The ship was abandoned in the North Sea Her crew survived. She was on a voyage from Newcastle upon Tyne, Northumberland, United Kingdom to Lübeck. Traube was driven ashore near Egersund, Norway the next day. She was refloated and taken in to "Servang".

== 15 February ==
List of shipwrecks: 15 February 1861
Ship	State	Description
Ashland	United States	The 274-ton sternwheel paddle steamer burned.
Catherina Regina	Russia	The brig was driven ashore at "Nyham, Sweden" and was abandoned by her crew. She was on a voyage from Newcastle upon Tyne, Northumberland, United Kingdom to Copenhagen, Denmark. She had been refloated by 14 February and taken in to Holbæk, Denmark.
Catherine	Denmark	The brig was driven ashore and wrecked at "Nordmanshag", near Hals. Her crew were rescued.
Gulnare	United Kingdom	The barque was carried out to sea from Odesa by ice. No further trace, presumed foundered.
Matanzas	United Kingdom	The barque was driven ashore and wrecked at Strangford, County Antrim. Her crew were rescued. She was on a voyage from Antwerp, Belgium to the Clyde.
Panope	United Kingdom	The barque was abandoned in the Atlantic Ocean 106 nautical miles (196 km) south west of Cape Clear Island, County Cork. Her crew were rescued. She was on a voyage from Liverpool, Lancashire to Gibraltar.

== 16 February ==
List of shipwrecks: 16 February 1861
Ship	State	Description
Arethusa	United Kingdom	The ship foundered in the Atlantic Ocean (49°58′N 69°00′W). Her crew were rescued by the brig Admiral P. Tordensjold (Norway). Arethusa was on a voyage from Liverpool, Lancashire to Moulmein, Burma.
Telegraph	United States	The fishing schooner was damaged in a collision with the schooner M. C. Rowe (United States) off Eastern Point Light and became unmanageable, and went ashore near Norman's Woe, a total loss. 1 crewman died.

== 17 February ==
List of shipwrecks: 17 February 1861
Ship	State	Description
Alpha	Norway	The ship was driven ashore and wrecked at Newburgh, Fife, United Kingdom. Her crew were rescued. She was on a voyage from Mandal to Wick, Caithness, United Kingdom. Alpha was refloated on 1 March and taken in to Aberdeen, United Kingdom.
Horsear	(United Kingdom of Great Britain and Ireland) British North America	The brig collided with the brig Morton (United States) and sank off the Double Headed Shot Keys. She was on a voyage from Cardenas, Cuba to New York, United States.
San Spiridone	Greece	The brig was wrecked in Tramore Bay with the loss of six of her ten crew. Survivors were rescued by the Tramore Lifeboat. She was on a voyage from Swansea, Glamorgan, United Kingdom to Barcelona, Spain.
Traffic	United Kingdom	The schooner was driven ashore and wrecked at Rattray Head, Aberdeenshire. Her crew were rescued. She was on a voyage from Sunderland, County Durham to Banff, Aberdeenshire.
Zoe	Austrian Empire	The full-rigged ship departed from Cardiff, Glamorgan for Venice, Kingdom of Lombardy–Venetia. Presumed subsequently foundered with the loss of all hands. A mast and rigging from the vessel was towed in to Milford Haven, Pembrokeshire, United Kingdom on 15 March.

== 18 February ==
List of shipwrecks: 18 February 1861
Ship	State	Description
Arthemise	France	The brig collided with Mentor ( (United Kingdom of Great Britain and Ireland) Jersey) in the Isles of Scilly. After picking up the crew of Mentor, Arthemise was run ashore. She was declared a total loss.
Balsamine	France	The ship ran aground at Sunderland, County Durham, United Kingdom.
Baronsmore	United Kingdom	The ship foundered in the Indian Ocean with the loss of five of her crew. She was on a voyage from Rangoon, Burma to Liverpool, Lancashire.
Criterion	United Kingdom	The ship was wrecked at South Hook Point, Pembrokeshire with the loss of all hands.
Elizabeth	United Kingdom	The ship was driven ashore at Nolton Haven, Pembrokeshire. Her crew were rescued. She was on a voyage from Whitehaven, Cumberland to Neath, Glamorgan.
Emelia	Portugal	The barque was driven ashore and wrecked north of the mouth of the Rio Grande with the loss of four of her crew. She was on a voyage from Lisbon to the Rio Grande.
Hebe	United Kingdom	The ship was driven ashore at Burnpool, near Plymouth, Devon. She was refloated and resumed her voyage.
Hero	United Kingdom	The polacca-rigged brig slipped her moorings in the harbor at Penzance, Cornwall, during south-southwesterly hurricane-force winds. Four of her crew and two others drowned. She was on a voyage from Newport, Monmouthshire to Plymouth.
Johannes	Denmark	The ship was driven ashore on Møn. Her crew were rescued. She was on a voyage from Rønne to an English port.
Kate Sarchet	United States	The 184-ton sternwheel paddle steamer was stranded.
Mentor	(United Kingdom of Great Britain and Ireland) Jersey	The ship parted her cables in the Isles of Scilly and collided with the brig Arthemise (France). The crew managed to get on board Arthemise which then was run ashore.
Oak	United Kingdom	The sloop departed from Milford Haven for Newport, Monmouthshire. No further trace, presumed foundered with the loss of all hands.
Pauline	France	Carrying railway iron from Ardrossan, Ayrshire, United Kingdom to Rouen, France, the schooner was driven onto Crow Bar in the Isles of Scilly. She capsized and was wrecked.
Sea Adventure	United Kingdom	The brig struck the pier at Sunderland and was severely damaged. She was beached. She was on a voyage from Portsmouth, Hampshire to Sunderland. She was refloated on 21 February and taken in to Sunderland.
Surprise	United Kingdom	The smack was driven ashore at Monkhaven Point, Pembrokeshire. Her crew were rescued.
Tartar	United Kingdom	The ship was driven against the pier at Maryport, Cumberland and was damaged.

== 19 February ==
List of shipwrecks: 19 February 1861
Ship	State	Description
Aquila	United Kingdom	The schooner was wrecked at Aberystwyth, Cardiganshire. Her crew were rescued by HMS Violet (Royal Navy). She was on a voyage from Llanelly, Glamorgan to Aberdovey, Merionethshire.
Bewley	United Kingdom	The brig was wrecked at Hartlepool, County Durham. Her crew were rescued by the Hartlepool Lifeboat and rocket apparatus. She was on a voyage from London to Middlesbrough, Yorkshire. She was refloated on 26 February and taken in to Hartlepool in a waterlogged condition.
Californian	United States	The ship ran aground and was damaged. She was on a voyage from Cardiff, Glamorgan, United Kingdom to New York, United States. She put in to Bermuda in a leaky condition and was consequently condemned.
Catharina	Netherlands	The koff was beached at La Flotte, Charente-Inférieure, France. She was on a voyage from Sunderland, County Durham, United Kingdom to Bordeaux, Gironde, France.
Corinthian Lass	United Kingdom	The ship was abandoned in the Atlantic Ocean. Her crew were rescued by Roscoe (United Kingdom).
Elizabeth and Mary	United Kingdom	The smack was wrecked near "Llanwawr", Pembrokeshire with the loss of a crew member. She was on a voyage from Milford Haven, Pembrokeshire to Newport, Monmouthshire.
Gipsy	(United States) Confederate States of America	The 43-ton sidewheel paddle steamer struck a snag and sank in Black Bayou in Louisiana.
Industry	United Kingdom	The polacca was driven ashore at Appledore, Devon with the loss of her captain. She was on a voyage from Newport to Bideford, Devon.
Lancashire Lass	United Kingdom	The schooner was beached at Hubberston Pill, Pembrokeshire. She was on a voyage from New York to Waterford.
Lion	United Kingdom	The smack was driven ashore and wrecked 8 nautical miles (15 km) south of Bridlington, Yorkshire.
Mary and Ann	United Kingdom	The coaster, a sloop, was driven ashore and wrecked at Pencaer, Pembrokeshire with the loss of one of her three crew.
Maury	United States	The ship was driven ashore on Long Island, New York, She was on a voyage from Amoy, China to New York City.
Raglan	United Kingdom	The ship foundered in the Atlantic Ocean. Her crew were rescued. she was on a voyage from Newport, Monmouthshire to Lisbon, Portugal.
Robert and Elizabeth	United Kingdom	The ship was driven ashore at Drogheda, County Louth.
Siegfried	Stettin	The barque was driven ashore at Margate, Kent, United Kingdom. She was on a voyage from Stettin to Bristol, Gloucestershire, United Kingdom. She was refloated.
Susan	United Kingdom	The ship was driven ashore and wrecked at Dungarvan, County Waterford with the loss of four of her six crew. She was on a voyage from Newport, Monmouthshire to Cork.
Voritas	(Denmark) Duchy of Schleswig	The schooner was driven ashore between Mariager and Randers Fjord.
Unnamed	United Kingdom	The schooner was driven ashore and wrecked at Great Castle Head, Pembrokeshire with the loss of all hands.
Unnamed	United Kingdom	The schooner was driven ashore at Freshwater West, Pembrokeshire.
Unnamed	United Kingdom	The ship was driven ashore at "Llanwawr", Pembrokeshire.
Unnamed	United Kingdom	The smack was wrecked in the River Tay with the loss of all hands.

== 20 February ==
List of shipwrecks: 20 February 1861
Ship	State	Description
Augustin	France	The brig was wrecked in the Cattewater with the loss of three of her eight crew. Survivors were rescued by the fishing sloop Four Brothers (United Kingdom). Augustine was on her maiden voyage, from Nantes, Loire-Inférieure to Plymouth, Devon, United Kingdom.
California	United States	The barque struck a reef off Bermuda and was damages. She was on a voyage from Cardiff, Glamorgan, United Kingdom to New York. She put in to Bermuda in a leaky condition.
Comet	United Kingdom	The ship was driven ashore near Belfast, County Antrim. She was on a voyage from Liverpool, Lancashire to "Ramilton"
Dorothea	Belgium	The brig was driven ashore and wrecked at Skibbereen, County Cork, United Kingdom. She was on a voyage from Minatitlán, Mexico to Cowes, Isle of Wight, United Kingdom.
Elizabeth D. Cameron	(United Kingdom of Great Britain and Ireland) British North America	The brigantine was wrecked on the Anegada Shoals. She was on a voyage from Liverpool to Saint Thomas, Virgin Islands.
HMS Enchantress	Royal Navy	The store ship ran aground on a reef at Mayotte in the Mozambique Channel. The wreck was later destroyed by the frigate HMS Sidon.
Freedom	(United Kingdom of Great Britain and Ireland) Jersey	The schooner was driven ashore and wrecked at Plymouth. She was on a voyage from Jersey to Pont-l'Abbé, Finistère, France.
Fury	Prussia	The barque was driven ashore at Plymouth. Her crew were rescued. She was on a voyage from Memel to Belfast, County Antrim, United Kingdom. Fury was refloated on 23 February and taken in to the Cattewater.
Giuseppina	Flag unknown	The ship ran aground on the Goodwin Sands, Kent, United Kingdom. She was on a voyage from Bolivia to Berwick upon Tweed, Northumberland, United Kingdom. She was refloated with the assistance of a cutter and a tug and taken in to Deal, Kent.
Meotide	Austrian Empire	The full-rigged ship was driven ashore and wrecked at St Mawes Castle, Cornwall. She was on a voyage from Alexandria, Egypt to London, United Kingdom.
Richard	Stralsund	The brigantine was driven ashore and wrecked at Deersound, Orkney Islands, United Kingdom with the loss of a crew member. She was on a voyage from Sunderland, County Durham, United Kingdom to Greifswald.
Susan	United Kingdom	The ship was wrecked at Mine Head, County Cork. Her crew were rescued. She was on a voyage from Newport, Monmouthshire to Cork.
Voador do Vonga	(flag) Portugal	The schooner was driven ashore at Tramore, County Waterford, United Kingdom. Her eight crew were rescued by the Tramore Lifeboat. She was on a voyage from Viana do Castelo to Cork.
W. D. Sewell	United States	The ship was driven ashore in the River Avon at Clifton, Gloucestershire, United Kingdom. She was refloated and taken in to Bristol, Gloucestershire.
Unnamed	Greece	The brig was driven ashore and wrecked at Polzeath, Cornwall, United Kingdom with the loss of eight of her eleven crew. She was on a voyage from Cardiff to Jamaica.

== 21 February ==
List of shipwrecks: 21 February 1861
Ship	State	Description
Carrier	United States	The 345-ton sidewheel paddle steamer sank in the Mississippi River at Island Number 25. She was raised, repaired, and returned to service.
City of Kandy	United Kingdom	The ship was driven ashore in Swansea Bay. She was refloated the next day and towed in to Swansea, Glamorgan.
Echo	United Kingdom	The full-rigged ship was abandoned 12 nautical miles (22 km) south of the Tusker Rock. Her crew were rescued. She was on a voyage from Liverpool, Lancashire to Calcutta, India.
Emerald	United Kingdom	The smack was driven ashore at the mouth of the River Avon. She was on a voyage from Bridgwater, Somerset to Sydney, New South Wales. She was later refloated and resumed her voyage.
Faithful	United Kingdom	The barque ran aground on the Girdler Sand. Her crew were rescued. She was on a voyage from Odesa to London. She was refloated on 23 February and resumed her voyage.
Ghita	Kingdom of Lombardy–Venetia	The barque was driven ashore and sank at Whitehaven, Cumberland, United Kingdom with the loss of eight of her fourteen crew. She was on a voyage from Cardiff, Glamorgan to Malta.
Glamorgan	United Kingdom	The schooner was driven ashore on St Martin's, Isles of Scilly. She was on a voyage from Cardiff to San Sebastián, Spain. she was refloated the next day.
Grecian	Flag unknown	In ballast, the schooner was wrecked on Block Island off the coast of Rhode Island, United States.
James	United Kingdom	The brig was run into by the steamship Henry Morton in the River Tyne and was beached.
Jumeaux	France	The brigantine was driven ashore on "Tear Island" and was damaged. She was refloated.
Lawn	France	The lugger was driven ashore at Breaksea Point, Glamorgan, United Kingdom. Her crew were rescued. She was on a voyage from Nantes, Loire-Inférieure to Cardiff.
Lord Hungerford	United Kingdom	The ship was driven ashore at St. Mary's, Isles of Scilly.
Mary Jane	(United Kingdom of Great Britain and Ireland) British North America	The ship was driven ashore on Tresco, Isles of Scilly. She was refloated on 23 February and taken in to St. Mary's.
Merlin	United Kingdom	The ship was driven ashore at St. Mary's, Isles of Scilly. Her crew were rescued. She was on a voyage from London to São Miguel Island, Azores. She subsequently broke up.
Rival	(United Kingdom of Great Britain and Ireland) Guernsey	The cutter was driven ashore and wrecked on Sark. All eight people on board were rescued. She was on a voyage from Guernsey to Sark.
San Pandalermo	Papal States	The ship was wrecked at Padstow, Cornwall, United Kingdom, with the loss of eight of her eleven crew. She was on a voyage from Cardiff to Civitavecchia.
Vera	United Kingdom	The ship capsized and sank at King's Lynn, Norfolk. She was later righted.
Unnamed	Flag unknown	The brig was driven ashore at St. Mary's, Isles of Scilly.

== 22 February ==
List of shipwrecks: 22 February 1861
Ship	State	Description
Ailsa	United Kingdom	The ship was driven ashore at St Brides, Pembrokeshire.
Artémise, and Mentor	France (United Kingdom of Great Britain and Ireland) Jersey	The schooner Mentor was driven into the brig Artémise in the Isles of Scilly and then driven ashore and was wrecked on St Martin's, Isles of Scilly. She was on a voyage from Sierra Leone to London. Artemise was driven ashore and wrecked on Tresco, Isles of Scilly.
Countess of Zetland	United Kingdom	The brig ran aground on the Middle Sand, in the North Sea off the coast of Lincolnshire. She was on a voyage from Seaham, County Durham to London. She was refloated but was subsequently wrecked on the Trinity Sand. Her crew were rescued.
Fennegia	Netherlands	The ship was abandoned in the Atlantic Ocean. Her crew were rescued by Regulus (Bremen). Fennegia was on a voyage from Newcastle upon Tyne, Northumberland, United Kingdom to Porto, Portugal.
Friedrich Wilhelm III	Prussia	The barque was abandoned in the North Sea. Her fifteen crew survived; eleven reached the Shetland Islands, United Kingdom in two boats, four were rescued by the steamship Sovereign (United Kingdom). Friedrich Wilhelm III was on a voyage from Sunderland, County Durham, United Kingdom to Stettin.
Glaita	Flag unknown	The barque was driven ashore and wrecked at Redness Point, Cumberland, United Kingdom with the loss of eight of her crew. She was on a voyage from Cardiff, Glamorgan, United Kingdom to Malta.
Hiawatha, and Joseph	United States; Belgium	The barque Hiawatha collided with the brigantine Joseph and was driven ashore and wrecked at Plymouth, Devon, United Kingdom. She was on a voyage from Havre de Grâce, Seine-Inférieure, France to New York. Joseph was also driven ashore. Her crew were rescued. She was on a voyage from Ostend, West Flanders to Liverpool, Lancashire, United Kingdom. She was refloated and taken in to Sutton Harbour.
Othello	France	The brig was abandoned in the English Channel off the Isle of Wight, United Kingdom. She was towed in to Portsmouth, Hampshire, United Kingdom the next day by the pilot boat Alarm (United Kingdom).
Pigeon	United Kingdom	The schooner was driven ashore at Plymouth Hoe, Devon.

== 24 February ==
List of shipwrecks: 24 February 1861
Ship	State	Description
Conte Szecheny	Austrian Empire	The barque ran aground in the River Avon and was damaged. She was on a voyage from Bristol, Gloucestershire to Cardiff, Glamorgan, United Kingdom. She was refloated and put back to Bristol for repairs.
Isabella	United Kingdom	The schooner foundered off the coast of Lincolnshire. Her crew were rescued. She was on a voyage from Seaham, County Durham to Great Yarmouth, Norfolk.
Lady Sale	United Kingdom	The ship ran aground at King's Lynn, Norfolk.
Polly	United Kingdom	The brig was abandoned in the Atlantic Ocean. Her crew were rescued by Alphington (United Kingdom). Polly was on a voyage from Brăila, Ottoman Empire to London.
Sarah Dorothy	United Kingdom	The barque ran aground on the Newcombe Sand, in the North Sea off the coast of Suffolk. She was refloated and taken in to Lowestoft, Suffolk.
Trial	United Kingdom	The ship foundered in the Bristol Channel off Lundy Island, Devon. Her crew survived. She was on a voyage from Gloucester to Hayle, Cornwall.

== 25 February ==
List of shipwrecks: 25 February 1861
Ship	State	Description
Abeona	United Kingdom	The barque was driven ashore at Jaffa, Ottoman Syria. Her crew were rescued.
Alan Ker	United Kingdom	The ship ran aground at Greenock, Renfrewshire.
Catherine	Netherlands	The galiot was holed by her anchor at Shoreham-by-Sea, Sussex, United Kingdom.
Flirt	United Kingdom	The ship collided with the barque Testimonial (United Kingdom) in the River Tyne and was severely damaged.
Lady Isabella	United Kingdom	The ship capsized off Glasson Dock, Lancashire.
Thomas Young	United Kingdom	The brig struck rocks at Ferrol, Spain and was damaged. She was on a voyage from South Shields, County Durham to Ferrol. She was refloated and taken in to Ferrol in a severely leaky condition.

== 26 February ==
List of shipwrecks: 26 February 1861
Ship	State	Description
Unicorn	(United Kingdom of Great Britain and Ireland) British North America	The barque ran aground on the Haisborough Sands, in the North Sea off the coast of Norfolk. She floated off and came ashore at Scratby, Norfolk.

== 27 February ==
List of shipwrecks: 27 February 1861
Ship	State	Description
Aphophis	United Kingdom	The ship was driven ashore at Cowes, Isle of Wight. She was refloated.
Heather Bell	United Kingdom	The steamship ran aground and sank at Littleferry, Sutherland. All on board were rescued. She was refloated.
Lady Shelburne	United Kingdom	The ship was driven ashore at Dungeness, Kent. She was on a voyage from London to the Cape of Good Hope, Cape Colony. She was refloated the next day and taken in to Dover, Kent.
Rio	United Kingdom	The ship ran aground on the Haisborough Sands, in the North Sea off the coast of Norfolk. She was on a voyage from Hartlepool, County Durham to Dunkirk, Nord, France. She was refloated and taken in to Lowestoft, Suffolk in a severely leaky condition.
Sarremacca	Netherlands	The schooner ran aground on the Goodwin Sands, Kent. She was on a voyage from Rotterdam, South Holland to an American port. She was refloated with assistance from the luggers Morning Star and Petrel (both United Kingdom).
Wilhelm	Hamburg	The ship ran aground off Brielle, South Holland, Netherlands. She was on a voyage from Cuxhaven to Rotterdam, South Holland. She was refloated the next day.

== 28 February ==
List of shipwrecks: 28 February 1861
Ship	State	Description
Billow	United Kingdom	The ship was abandoned in the Atlantic Ocean off the Smalls Lighthouse. Her crew survived. She was on a voyage from Wexford to Gloucester.
Corrine	(United States) Confederate States of America	The 83-ton sidewheel paddle steamer was destroyed by an explosion at McDonoghville in the Algiers section of New Orleans, Louisiana, with the loss of 15 lives.
John George	United Kingdom	The barque ran aground on the Longsand, in the North Sea off the coast of Essex. She was on a voyage from South Shields, County Durham to Cartagena, Spain. She was refloated with the assistance of several smacks.
Lockwood	United Kingdom	The full-rigged ship struck the pier at Sunderland, County Durham and was severely damaged.
New Robson	United Kingdom	The ship collided with a brig and sank off Whitby, Yorkshire. Her crew survived.
Pallas	United Kingdom	The barque ran aground at Cagliari, Sardinia. She was on a voyage from Licata, Sicily to Queenstown, County Cork. She was refloated and taken in to Cagliari for repairs.
Rosa Maria, and Sarah Tennant	Austrian Empire; United Kingdom	Sarah Tennant collided with Rosa Maria at Penarth, Glamorgan and sank. Rosa Maria was severely damaged.
Sardinian	United Kingdom	The steamship was damaged by an onboard explosion at Sunderland. One crew member was severely injured.

== Unknown date ==
List of shipwrecks: Unknown date February 1861
Ship	State	Description
Bogota	United Kingdom	The steamship ran aground in the Guayas River.
Charles Brownell	United States	The ship was abandoned in the Atlantic Ocean before 19 February. Her crew survived. She was on a voyage from Baltimore, Maryland to Liverpool, Lancashire, United Kingdom.
Chasseur	France	The ship was lost in the Mediterranean Sea before 12 February.
Coralia	France	The barque was wrecked at Carmen, Mexico. She was on a voyage from Saint Thomas, Virgin Islands to Carmen.
Corbiere	(United Kingdom of Great Britain and Ireland) Jersey	The ship was abandoned in the Atlantic Ocean before 15 February. Her crew were rescued. She was on a voyage from New York, United States to Queenstown, County Cork.
Dorothy	United Kingdom	The brigantine was wrecked near St Alban's Head, Dorset.
Emma	(United Kingdom of Great Britain and Ireland) British North America	The ship was abandoned in the Atlantic Ocean. Her crew were rescued by Satellite (United States). Emma was on a voyage from Saint John's, Newfoundland to Figueira da Foz, Portugal.
Escape	United Kingdom	The ship foundered in the Atlantic Ocean before 21 February. Her crew were rescued. She was on a voyage from Newport, Monmouthshire to Lisbon, Portugal.
Euphrosine	France	The full-rigged ship was abandoned between 8 and 10 February. Her crew were rescued by the steamship Mangerton (United Kingdom). Euphrosine was on a voyage from Cherbourg, Manche to Preston, Lancashire, United Kingdom.
Fearnought	United Kingdom	The ship was wrecked on Lenia Island between 7 and 15 February. She was on a voyage from Hong Kong, China to Singapore, Straits Settlements.
Fort Wayne	United States	The 321-ton sternwheel paddle steamer sank in the Mississippi River at Island No. 16. She later was refloated.
Frederick Tauve	Denmark	The schooner foundered off the Outer Hebrides, United Kingdom before 8 February.
Garibaldi	United Kingdom	The full-rigged ship was lost near Pensacola, Florida, Confederate States of America. Her crew were rescued. She was on a voyage from Belfast, County Antrim to Pensacola.
General Windham	United Kingdom	The brigantine departed from Poole, Dorset for Hartlepool, County Durham in early February. No further trace, presumed foundered with the loss of all hands.
H. M. Stanwood	United States	The fishing schooner was probably lost on the Georges Bank in a gale. Lost with all 8 hands.
Jane and Margaret	United Kingdom	The schooner was presumed to have foundered with the loss of all hands; a boat came ashore at Bull Bay, Anglesey. She was on a voyage from Garston, Lancashire to Amlwch, Anglesey.
John and Elizabeth	United Kingdom	The ship collided with the snow Pulla (United Kingdom) and sank in the North Sea. Her crew were rescued by Pulla.
Kandian Chief	United Kingdom	The barque was abandoned in the North Sea 6 nautical miles (11 km) north west of the Newark Lightship ( Trinity House) before 25 February with loss of life.
Liffey	United Kingdom	The ship was abandoned at sea. Her crew were rescued. She was on a voyage from Alexandria, Egypt to London.
Madonna del Amiato	Kingdom of the Two Sicilies	The ship was run ashore at Marsala before 2 February. She was on a voyage from Castiglione di Sicilia to Malta.
Mariner	United Kingdom	The full-rigged ship foundered off Cape Finisterre, Spain. Her crew were rescued. She was on a voyage from Newport to Gibraltar.
Marmion	United Kingdom	The ship was severely damaged by ice in the Black Sea off Kertch, Russia.
Mary Ann	United Kingdom	The schooner was sighted off Flamborough Head, Yorkshire in mid-February. No further trace, presumed foundered with the loss of all hands.
Mary Weir	United Kingdom	The ship was abandoned in the Atlantic Ocean. Her crew were rescued. She was on a voyage from New York to London.
Nimrod	United States	The barque capsized in the Atlantic Ocean before 9 February. Her crew were rescued by Valentia (France).
Pauline	France	The brigantine was wrecked at Bayonne. Basses-Pyrénées before 8 February. Her crew were rescued by Gem and Good Intent (both United Kingdom). Pauline was on a voyage from Angles, Vendée to Hull, Yorkshire, United Kingdom.
Queen Margaret	United Kingdom	The barque was wrecked in the Gaspar Strait before 22 February. She was on a voyage from Calcutta to Singapore, Straits Settlements.
Sao Francisco di Paolo	Flag unknown	The ship was lost near Civitavecchia, Papal States. She was on a voyage from "Golja" to Marseille, Bouches-du-Rhône, France.
Scotch Lass	United Kingdom	The ship foundered in the Atlantic Ocean 150 nautical miles (280 km) west of the Azores before 3 February. Her crew were rescued. She was on a voyage from Newfoundland, British North America to Liverpool.
Scotland	United Kingdom	The ship was driven ashore in Struys Bay before 8 February.
Siam	United Kingdom	The ship capsized in the Atlantic Ocean before 15 February. Her crew were rescued.
Silver Star	United Kingdom	The full-rigged ship was wrecked on Jarvis Island before 7 February.
Spy	United Kingdom	The ship foundered off the coast of County Durham before 13 February.
Susan Young	United States	The fishing schooner was lost on the Georges Bank in a gale. Lost with all 9 hands.
Sweepstakes	United States	The fishing schooner was lost on the Georges Bank in a gale. Lost with all 8 hands.
Treasurer	United Kingdom	The ship departed from London for the River Tyne. No further trace, presumed foundered with the loss of all hands.
Twee Anthonys	Netherlands	The ship was driven ashore at Anjer, Netherlands East Indies before 16 February. All on board were rescued. Twee Anthonys was on a voyage from Rotterdam, South Holland to Batavia, Netherlands East Indies. She subsequently broke up.
White Swallow	United States	The fishing schooner was lost on the Georges Bank in a gale. Lost with all 9 hands.
