= Colt Island =

Uninhabited island off Skerries, near Dublin, Ireland

Native name: Inis Coilt
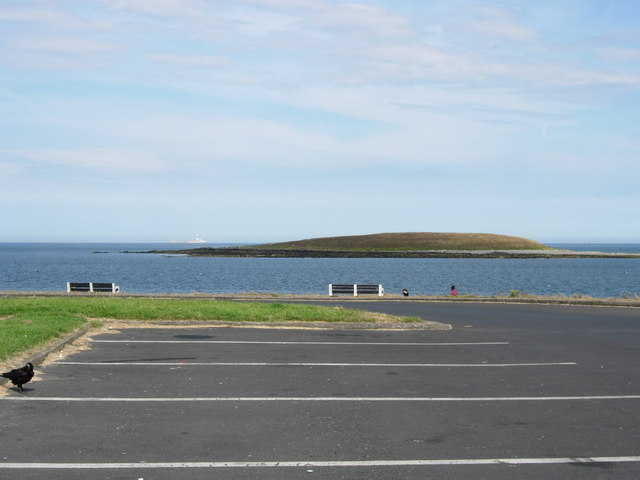
- View of Colt Island from Skerries

- Location within island of Ireland

Geography
- Location: Irish Sea
- Coordinates: 53°35′05″N 6°05′20″W

Administration
- Ireland
- Province: Leinster
- County: Dublin

Demographics
- Population: 0

Colt Island (Irish: Inis Coilt) is the closest and smallest of three low-lying, uninhabited islands off the headland of Skerries, County Dublin in Ireland.

== Toponymy ==
The origin of the original, Irish, name is unknown although it has been proposed to be related to a food source. The anglicised version of the name cannot be a translation as the Irish word for a colt is bromach.

== Environment ==
It is an island of low cliffs and lies about 0.5 km from the mainland, with vegetation consisting of grasses, brambles and other species such as hogweed. Like the other two Skerries Islands, it is important for breeding seabirds and wintering water fowl.
