= Lord Stanley (ship) =

Several vessels have been named Lord Stanley.

== Lord Stanley (1776 ship) ==
Lord Stanley was a snow, of 150 tons (bm), built at Liverpool in 1763, probably under the name Matty. The Massachusetts 10-gun privateer schooner True Blue, Captain Cole, captured Lord Stanley, Strickland, master, as she was sailing from Leghorn to Dublin, having come from Smyrna. HMS Hope recaptured Lord Stanley on 6 November 1776. She then became a prison transport ship and ultimately a prison ship at Halifax, Nova Scotia.

== Lord Stanley (1786 ship) ==
True Briton was launched at Liverpool in 1775. She made two voyages as a slave ship in the triangular trade in enslaved people. During the second of these voyages there was an unsuccessful insurrection by the slaves she was carrying. Then in 1777–1778 she made another slave voyage, this time under the name John. On her return to Liverpool, she became the privateer Bellona, and succeeded in taking several prizes. Bellona then made three voyages as a slave ship. In 1786 her ownership changed, and so did her name. She became Lord Stanley, and under that name proceeded to make 11 slave voyages. In 1794, at Havana, a deadly fever spread through the vessel, apparently after she had landed her slaves. On her last voyage the captain acted with such brutality towards a black crew member that the man, who providentially survived, sued the captain when the vessel arrived at Liverpool and won substantial damages.

== Lord Stanley (1825 ship) ==
Lord Stanley (1825 ship), of 336 tons (bm), was launched at Stockton in 1825. In February 1834 Rosina was on her way from Liverpool to Constantinople when she collided with Lord Stanley and sank; Rosina's crew was saved. On 4 April 1851. Lord Stanley, Mackay, master, was wrecked in the Paracel Islands. Mackay and his 14 crew members were rescued. She was on a voyage from Hong Kong to Singapore. She had left Hong Kong on 1 April with several convicts for the Straits of Malacca. Her entry in Lloyd's Register in 1851 carried the annotation "Wrecked".

== Lord Stanley (1841 ship) ==
Lord Stanley (1841 ship), of 500 tons (bm; old Act), or 665 tons (BM; new Act), was launched at New Brunswick in 1841. She transferred her registry to Liverpool. She first appeared in Lloyd's Register in 1843. In 1847 Lord Stanley, Peter, master, was at Aden when a spontaneous fire broke out in her cargo of cotton. She was subsequently repaired.

== Lord Stanley (1849 ship) ==
Lord Stanley (1849 ship), of 714 tons (bm; old Act), or 769 tons (BM; new Act), was launched at Quebec in 1849 by John Munn as a timber ship (timber carrier). She was re-registered at Beaumaris, Ontario on 25 March 1850. In 1850 she carried migrants from Liverpool to Sydney. Lord Stanley foundered on 17 September 1871 in the Atlantic Ocean. Norske Flag rescued five of her 16 crew members; her master, mate, and the rest were presumed to have drowned, having refused to abandon ship. Lord Stanley was on a voyage from Liverpool to Gaspé, Quebec. She had been reported missing on 22 August.
