= Morriscastle =

Seaside village in County Wexford, Ireland

Morriscastle Caisleán Mhurchú
- Village
- Location in Ireland
- Coordinates: 52.514153°N 6.241770°W
- Country: Ireland
- Province: Leinster
- County: County Wexford
- Irish Grid Reference: T151598

Morriscastle (Irish: Caisleán Mhurchú) is a coastal village that is situated 2 km from Kilmuckridge village in County Wexford, Ireland. Morriscastle is a tourist destination during the summer months.

== Morriscastle Beach ==
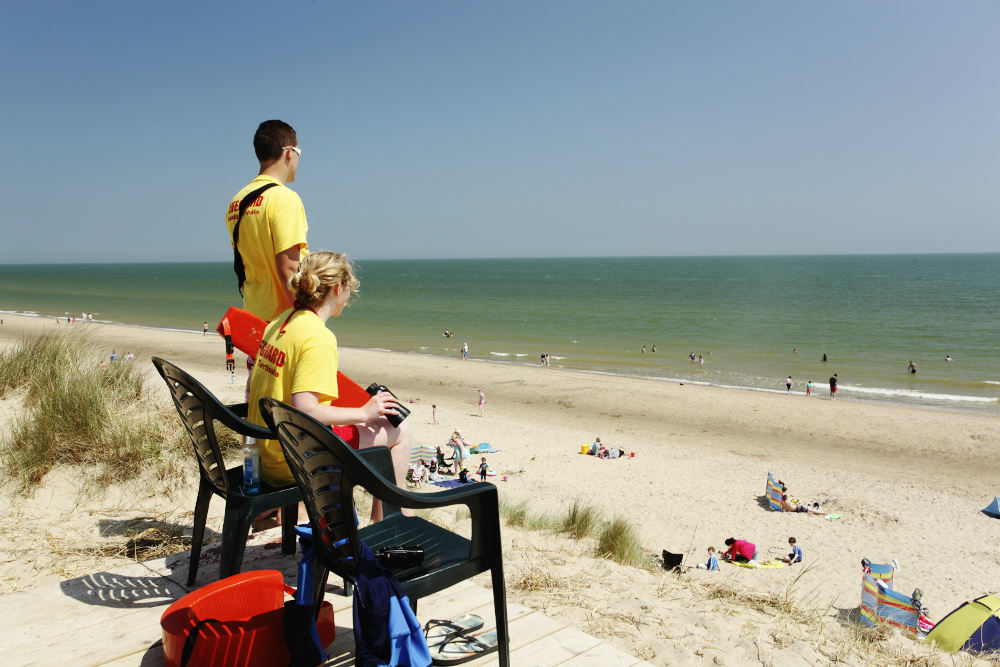
Morriscastle Beach

Morriscastle Beach is a part of a number of beaches that stretch for approximately 22 km from Cahore point to Curracloe in County Wexford and this sheltered stretch is known locally as the Golden Mile. Morriscastle Beach is sandy and relatively shallow making it a popular venue for families who stay at caravan parks and campsites in the vicinity. The local population can swell to over 5,000 during the summer months.

Located approximately 2 km from Kilmuckridge village and bordered by a sheltering dune system, this beach is attended by a lifeguard from June until the end of August and it is safe for swimming.

The beach stretches for over 2 km and is surrounded by several holiday parks that offer permanent and seasonal holiday park accommodation.

The beach runs parallel to a wide, deep sand dune system. Lifeguards or lifesaving equipment is provided to ensure the response to an emergency anywhere on this beach.

Morriscastle has also been awarded the Green Coast Beaches award.

== Angling ==
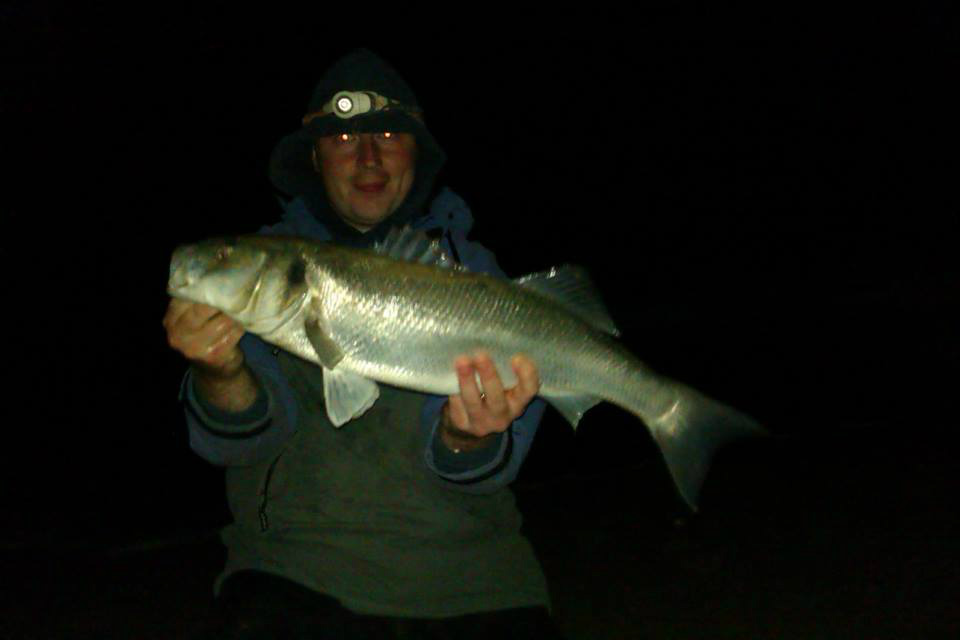
Large Sea Bass Caught in Morriscastle Beach

Moriscastle is regularly used by shore anglers, including for competitions. Specimen-sized fish found in the area include bass, tope, smoothhound, bullhuss, dogfish, spurdog, ray, flounder and dab. Seals are also sometimes be seen swimming near the shore.

== History ==
Morriscastle was once the site of a medieval Norman Castle and the ruin is visible from the roadway and is part of a national heritage site - Kilmuckridge Tinnaberna Sandhills. The nearest shipwreck lies off the coast of nearby Ballyconigar beach. The Pomona sank in 1859 losing 380 passengers while sailing from Liverpool to New York.

== See also ==
- List of Wexford Towns
- Visit Wexford
- Kilmuckridge Discover Ireland
- Angling in Morriscastle Strand
