= Irishtown Nature Park, Dublin =

Park in Dublin, Ireland

Irishtown Nature Park
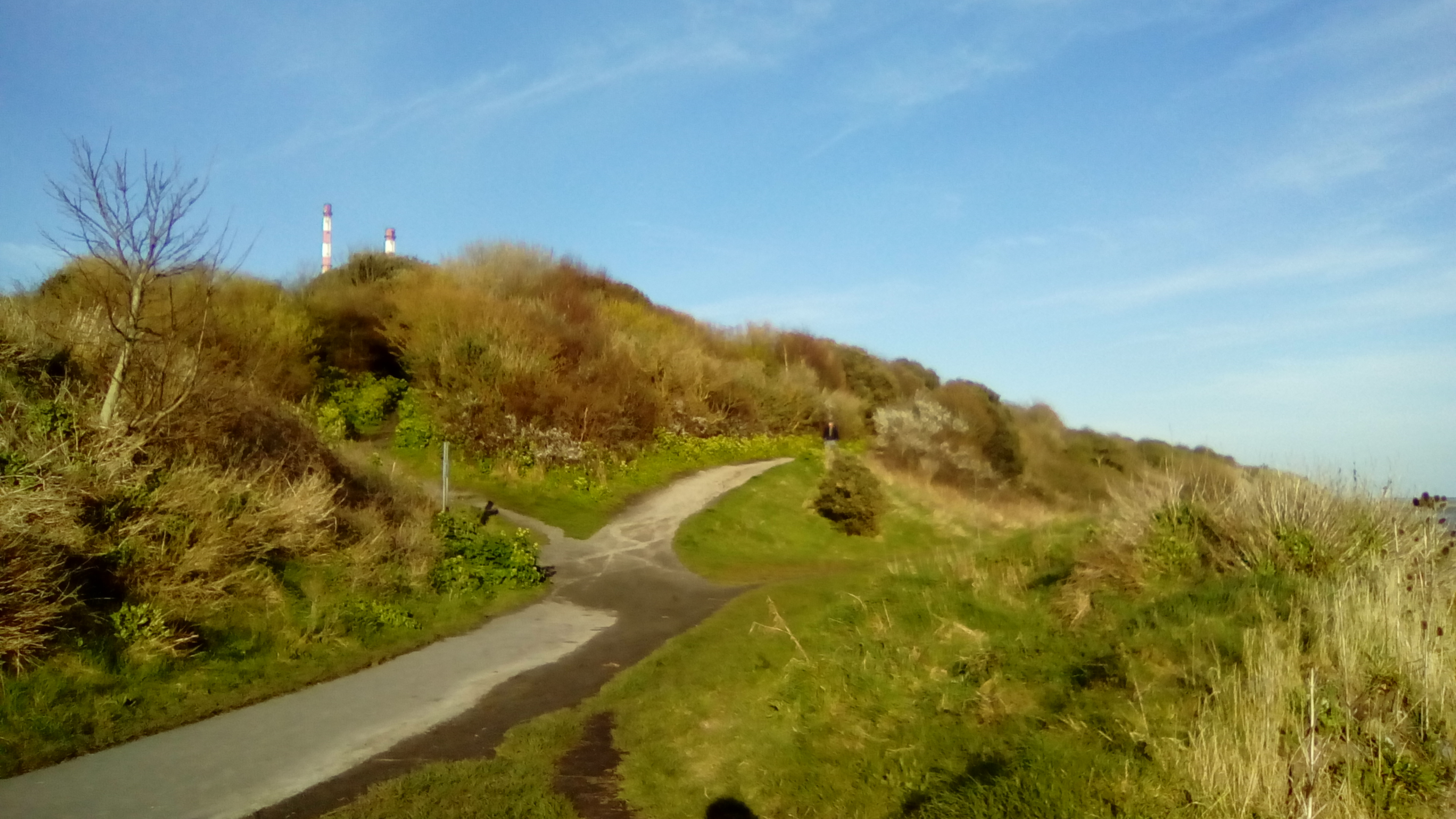

- Location within Dublin Location within Ireland
- Location: Dublin, Ireland
- OSI/OSNI grid: O 202 332
- Coordinates: 53°20′10″N 6°12′1″W
- Area: 21.60 acres

Irishtown Nature Park (Irish: Páirc Dhúlra an Bhaile Ghaelaigh) is a small man-made park between Irishtown and Sandymount Strand in Dublin, Ireland. The park contains several kilometres of walking trails along the Poolbeg Peninsula.

== History ==
The park was devised during a building boom in the 1970s, where rubble and waste were dumped in its current location. The Sandymount and Merrion Residents Association suggested turning the waste dump into a nature reserve. During the 1980s, Dublin Corporation, along with local residents, developed the park and planted seeds, trees, and tall grasses.

During the Wood Quay build and excavation in the early 1980s, up to 30 lorry loads of potentially significant archaeological rubble were dumped in the original location of the nature park.

== Access ==
The nature park can be accessed in two locations. An offroad path located on Beach Road, opposite Marine Drive, meanders across the edge of Sandymount Strand for 1.4 kilometres up to the park entrance. A second entrance is located on Pigeon House Road near the Poolbeg Generating Station.

== Environment ==
=== Fauna ===
Several species of birds, including skylarks, linnets, dunnocks, stonechats, herons, and Brent geese, visit the park every year. The park is also home to the red-tailed bumblebee, and a rare beetle, Oedemera lurida.

=== Flora ===
Plant and grassland species identified in the park have included Lolium perenne, Festuca rubra, Agrostis stolonifera, Cirsium arvense, blackberry plants, Prunus spinosa, Sambucus nigra, Pyramidal orchid and Fraxinus excelsior. Two non-native species are also present; Acer pseudoplatanus and Reynoutria japonica.
