= Kingstown lifeboat disaster =

1895 maritime incident in Ireland

Coordinates: 53.303218°N 6.121581°W

The Kingstown lifeboat disaster occurred on Christmas Eve 1895 off Kingstown (now Dún Laoghaire), Ireland, when the Kingstown No. 2 lifeboat capsized while attempting to rescue the crew of the stricken SS Palme. The crew of fifteen were lost. The event is commemorated annually at Dún Laoghaire Harbour.

== The Palme ==
The Palme, a 1,114 ton barque, was owned by the Eriksson family of Mariehamn, Finland, then part of the Russian Empire. She sailed under the Russian flag of horizontal white, blue, and red. On 18 December, she set sail from Liverpool bound for South America to import hardwood. She was commanded by Captain Wiren. He was accompanied by his wife and child. There was a crew of seventeen, three of whom spoke English.

== Weather ==
A storm described as "the most severe of the century" developed. The Palme tried to seek shelter in Dublin Bay, but was driven southeast. It was mid-winter and extremely cold. The sea was so heavy that waves were crashing over the lighthouse at the end of the East Pier of Dún Laoghaire. On Tuesday 24 December, Palme was seen dragging her anchor off Merrion strand. On danger of being smashed on the rocks, distress rockets were fired.

== The disaster ==
A new lifeboat, Civil Service No. 7 (ON 289), had been placed at Kingstown No.2 Lifeboat Station in 1890. Under Coxswain Alexander Williams, it went to assist the Palme. As she approached the vessel, the crew lowered the sails and rowed. Then, in full public view, the lifeboat was raised by a mighty wave and capsized. The self-righting lifeboat failed to self-right. Some of the lifeboat crew managed to climb onto the upturned hull. The crew of the Palme then tried to launch their ship's longboat, in the hope of rescuing their rescuers, but it was smashed by the waves.

The older Kingstown No.1 lifeboat Hannah Pickard, under Coxswain Horner, then went to sea. She was also capsized but righted herself and her crew regained the boat. They continued to search for survivors for 45 minutes, until oars were lost in the terrible conditions, and the No. 1 lifeboat was washed ashore at Vance's Harbour, Blackrock. The Poolbeg lifeboat, under Coxswain Captain Dalton, was also launched. She found conditions 'impossible' and had to turn back. Two tugs, Flying Sprite and Flying Swallow also tried and failed. All hope of rescuing the Palme was now abandoned. On Christmas Day, 25 December, crowds watched and prayed as the Palme was being broken by the gales. There was widespread public and press interest.

== Rescue ==
On Saint Stephen's Day 26 December, the Irish Lights steamer Tearaght under Captain Thomas McCombie, managed to reach the Palme and rescue the Master, his wife and child, 17 crew, and the ship's cat. Capt. McCombie was awarded the RNLI Gold Medal. By then, eight bodies of the lifeboat men had been recovered. In time, all fifteen bodies were found.

== Aftermath ==
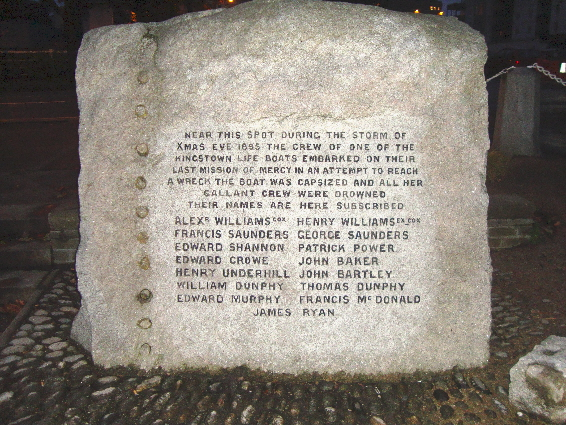
Memorial to the crew.

The funeral was the largest seen in Dún Laoghaire. Flags were lowered in all European ports. All fifteen were buried together in Deans Grange Cemetery. A fund was raised to support their dependents, with £2,200 coming from the RNLI and £300 was given to the families by the Russian Government. Further monies were received from the ship's owners in Finland and from 'the people of Russia'. There is a plaque on the old lifeboat station wall and a granite memorial. Every year, the event is remembered. At noon every Christmas Eve there is a procession along the East Pier, led by a piper. A short service is then held.

== Crew ==
- Coxswain Alexander Williams, age 35, married with six children
- Henry Williams (his father and ex-coxswain), age 60, married with three sons (including Alexander)
- John Baker, age 33 married with three children.
- John Bartley, aged 45, married with two children.
- Edward Crowe, age 30, married, no children.
- Thomas Dunphy, age 31, married three children.
- William Dunphy (his brother), age 40 married with six children.
- Francis McDonald, one son born early in 1896.
- Edward Murphy, age 30, married with three children.
- Patrick Power, age 22, single.
- James Ryan, age 24, single.
- George Saunders, age 30, married, one son born 8 months after his death.
- Francis Saunders (his brother), age 27, married with five children.
- Edward Shannon, age 28, married with four children.
- Henry Underhill, age 32 years, married, no children.
