= Harbour-class lifeboat =

Former RNLI lifeboat class

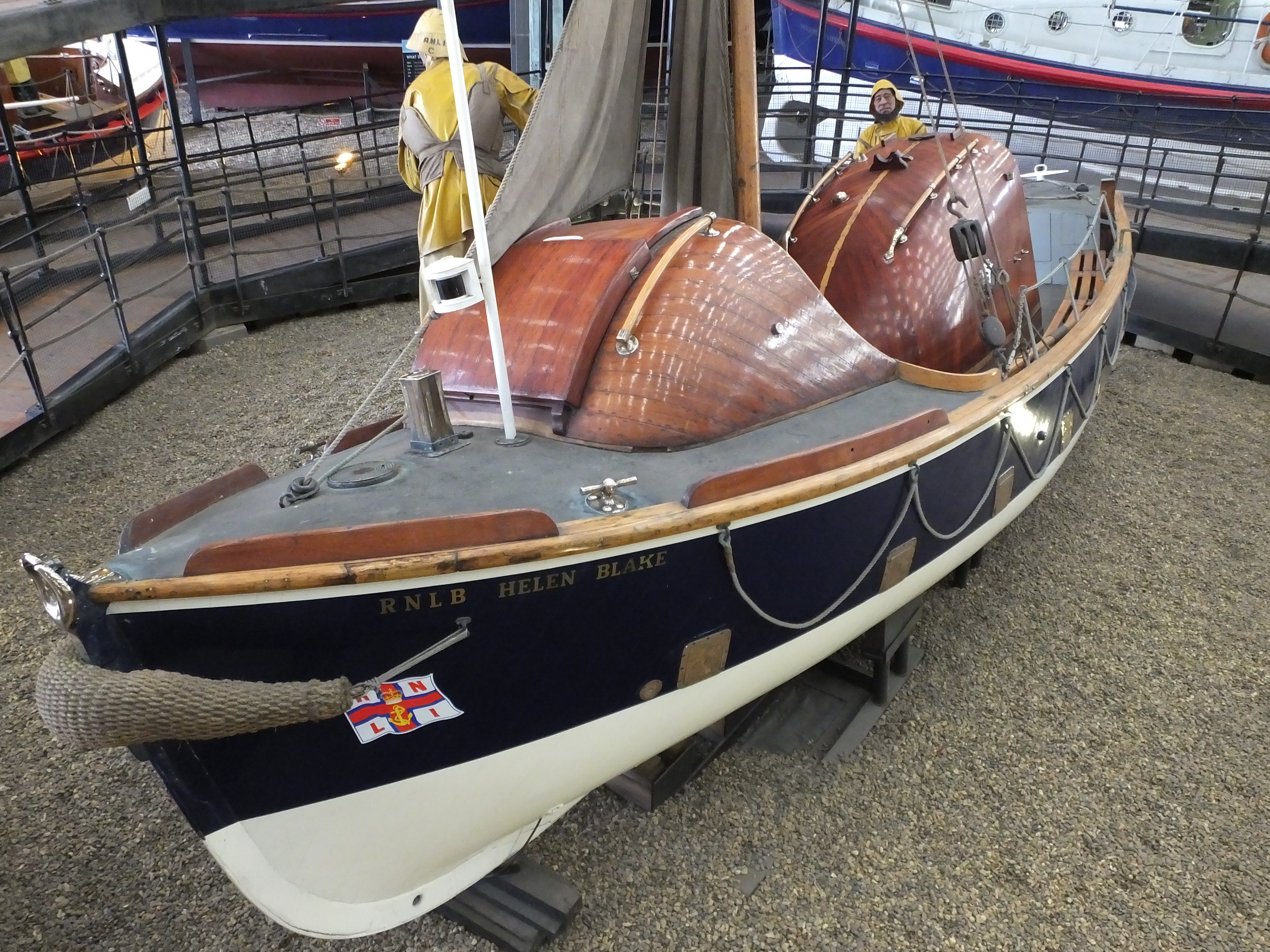
- Helen Blake (ON 809) at Chatham Historic Dockyard

Class overview
- Builders: Groves and Guttridge of Cowes
- Operators: Royal National Lifeboat Institution
- Cost: £1.893
- Built: 1938
- In service: 1938–1959
- Planned: 10
- Completed: 1
- Retired: 1
- Preserved: 1

General characteristics
- Displacement: 3.25 tons
- Length: 28 ft (8.5 m)
- Beam: 8 ft (2.4 m)
- Propulsion: 1 × 20-hp Hyland petrol engine
- Speed: 7.5 knots (8.6 mph; 13.9 km/h)
- Range: 40 nmi (74 km)
- Capacity: 23
- Complement: 5

The Harbour-class lifeboat was the first lifeboat to be classed as an Inshore lifeboat, operated by the Royal National Lifeboat Institution (RNLI). Only one was constructed, and operated at Poolbeg in Dublin Bay, Ireland for its entire service life.

== History ==
Sometime around 1936, the RNLI Boat Committee called for a new design of lifeboat, intended for close shore work within an estuary. The result was a 28-foot single screw wooden lifeboat, known as a "Harbour-class". An order for ten of these "Inshore" lifeboats was planned, but with the outbreak of World War II, only one ever reached the stage of being built, fully tried and tested, and then placed on service.

== Design ==
The only Harbour-class lifeboat was built in 1938 by Groves & Gutteridge, Ltd at their Cowes boatyard. The 28-foot x 8-foot 3¼-ton lifeboat was of conventional RNLI construction, with double diagonal mahogany planking on solid grown oak frames. A single 20-hp Hyland petrol-engine, in a watertight engine-room, powered the single-screw, and provided a top speed of 7.5 knots, with a range of 40 miles. The boat was divided into eight water-tight compartments and was fitted with 29 air-cases. The vessel also had a single mast supported a dipping lugsail, and fore-sail, and a set of oars as backup. 18 casualties could be transported in addition to the five crew.

== Service ==
After trials in the Solent, the lifeboat was placed on station in 1938 at Poolbeg in Ireland, ideally suited to the confined waters of the River Liffey. Lifeboat coverage for the larger Dublin Bay area was adequately covered by lifeboats at Dún Laoghaire and Howth. The boat, costing £1,893, had been funded from the legacy of the late Mrs Helen Blake of Handcross, Sussex. An official naming ceremony was planned for September 1939, but was postponed due the outbreak of war. The boat was named after the donor, Helen Blake (ON 809).

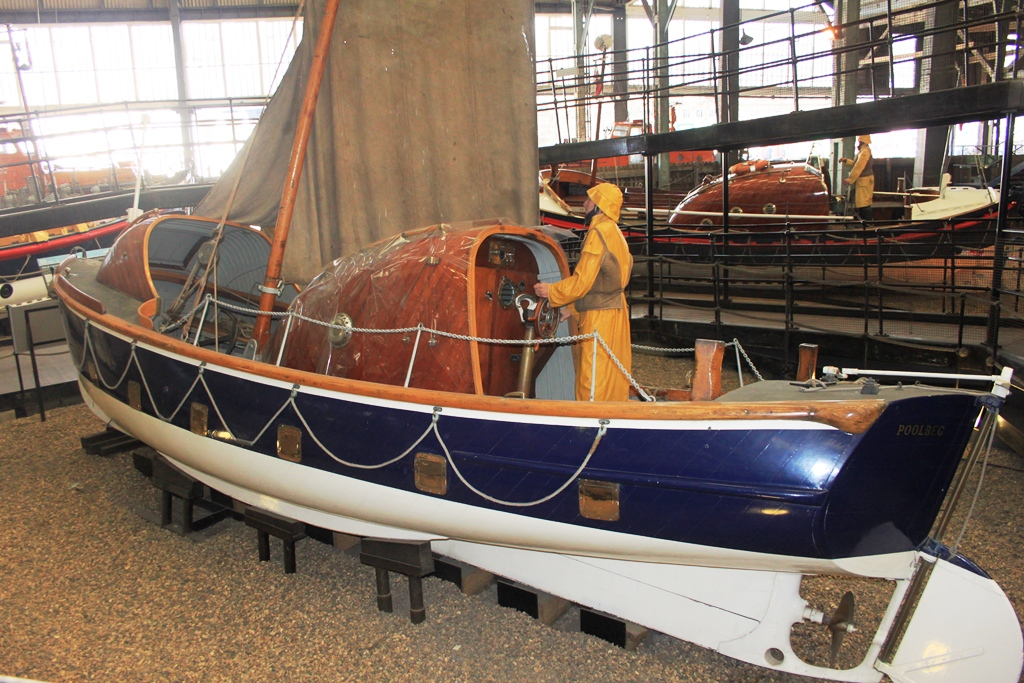
Harbour-class lifeboat Helen Blake (ON 809) at Chatham

Helen Blake (ON 809) was launched 13 times on service, and saved 5 lives. The lifeboat was retired and subsequently sold from service, when the Poolbeg station was closed in 1959. Now fully restored, she sits on display as part of the RNLI Heritage Collection at Chatham Historic Dockyard museum.

== Fleet ==
ON (Note: ON is the RNLI's Official Number of the boat.)	Name	Built	In service	Principal Station	Comments
809	Helen Blake	1938	1938–1959	Poolbeg	
