= Poolbeg Lifeboat Station =

Former RNLI lifeboat station in County Dublin, Ireland

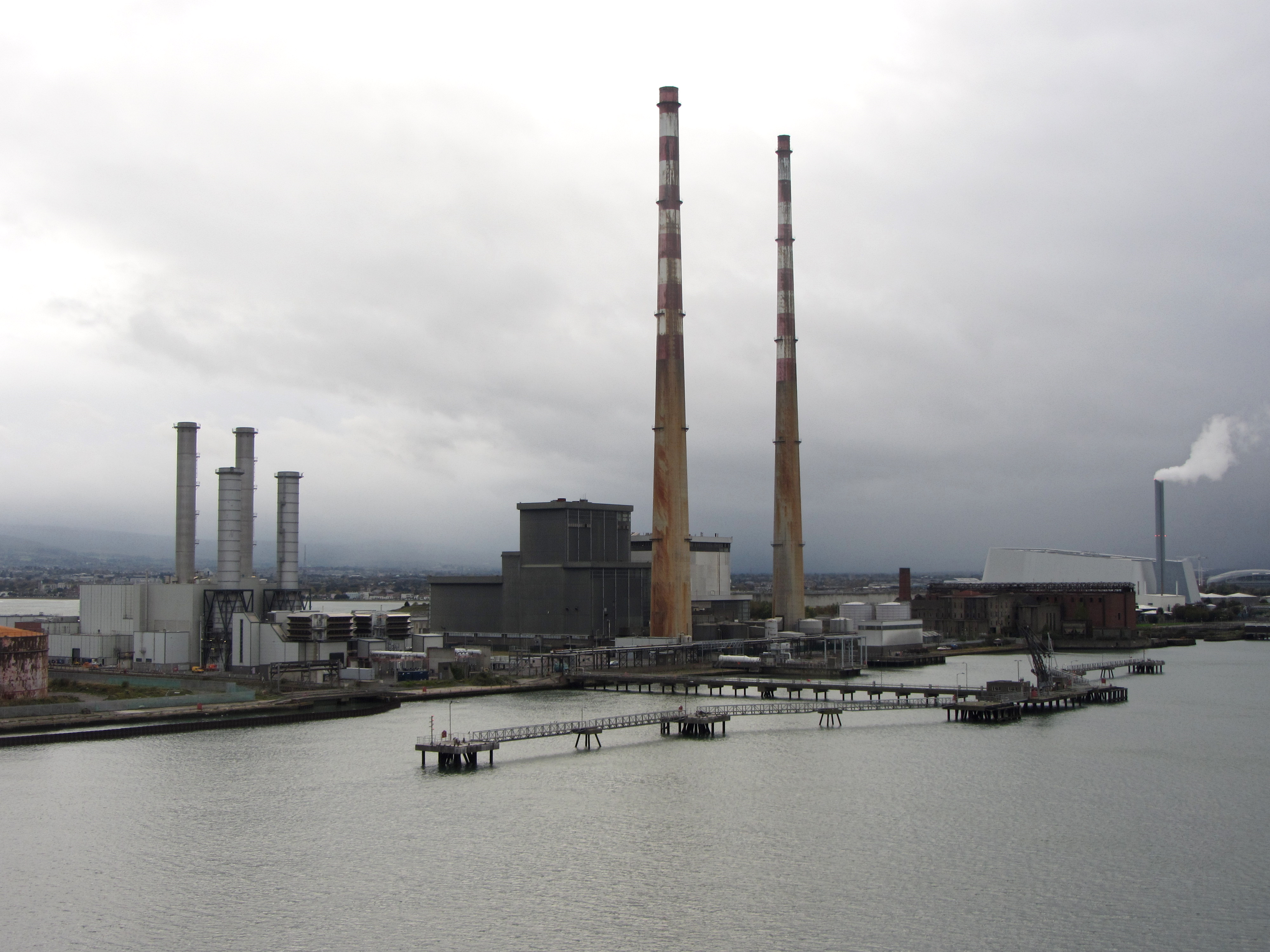
- Poolbeg

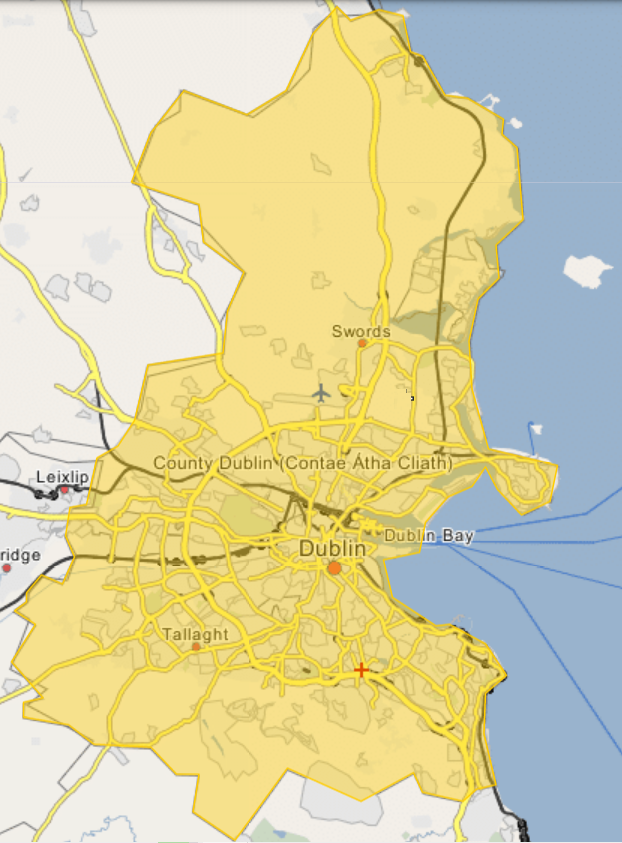
- Location within County Dublin

General information
- Status: Closed
- Type: RNLI Lifeboat Station
- Location: Pigeon House Fort, Poolbeg, County Dublin, Ireland
- Coordinates: 53°20′27.9″N 6°11′37.9″W
- Opened: 1804; 1862 RNLI
- Closed: 1959

Poolbeg Lifeboat Station was located near Pigeon House Fort, on the artificial peninsula of Poolbeg, reclaimed land which extends out from Ringsend, Dublin, into Dublin Bay, in the administrative region of Fingal, historically County Dublin, on the east coast of Ireland.

A lifeboat was first stationed at Poolbeg in 1804 by the Ship's Insurance Co. Management of the station was transferred to the Royal National Lifeboat Institution (RNLI) in 1862.

Poolbeg Lifeboat Station was closed in 1959.

== History ==
The first lifeboat to be placed at Poolbeg was operated by the Ship's Insurance Co. from Pigeonhouse Fort from 1804 to 1825. In 1820, a second lifeboat, built by Clements and Brady of Dublin was stationed "at the entrance to the River Liffey", kept on the quay near a crane, and operated by the Ballast Corporation of Dublin.

In early 1862, the Ballast Corporation made a request to the RNLI to take over the management of their three lifeboat stations, located at Howth, Kingstown and Poolbeg, which was agreed. A new unnamed fully equipped 30-foot self-righting 'Pulling and Sailing' (P&S) lifeboat, one with oars and sails, was provided to Poolbeg, arriving on station in March 1862. A new carriage for transportation was also provided, costing £66, and a new boathouse was constructed, at a cost of £235. The Ballast Corporation agreed to contribute £50 of the annual cost of the station.

On the morning of 29 October 1865, the Poolbeg lifeboat was launched to the aid of the schooner Emma of Barrow-in-Furness, driven ashore at South Bull Sand, whilst on passage from Ardrossan to Newport, Wales. In a SSE gale, and with considerable difficulty, the crew of six were rescued.

During an ENE gale on the night of 28 October 1880, the schooner Robert Brown of Warrenpoint was driven ashore near Pigeonhouse Fort. Two of the four crew were swept away and drowned, but the other two men were seen lashed to the rigging at daybreak by the coastguard. With the normal Poolbeg lifeboat crew absent on training, a replacement crew of local fishermen, seamen and soldiers from the fort was assembled. Launching over a beach strewn with debris and boulders, the crew fought to reach the vessel in extreme conditions, but after 30 minutes, successfully rescued the two men. Five RNLI Medals were awarded, with acting coxswain Lt. J. A. W. O.Neill Torrens being awarded the RNLI Gold Medal.

In 1884, the lifeboat was moored afloat in Pigeonhouse Fort basin, after the sea undermined the lifeboat house, rendering it unsafe. In 1907, a new corrugated boathouse and slipway was constructed at the entrance to the basin by Mr Langley of Dublin, at a cost of £430-15s-0d.

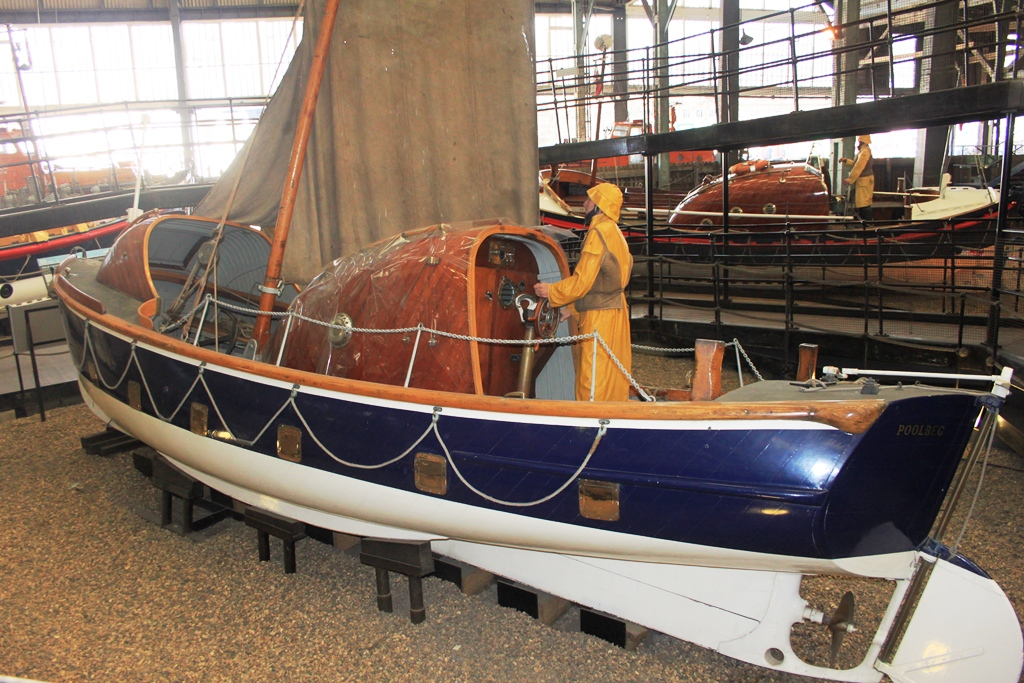
Harbour-class lifeboat Helen Blake (ON 809), part of the RNLI Heritage Collection at Chatham Historic Dockyard

Poolbeg would receive a unique new lifeboat in 1938. The 28-foot Harbour-class motor-powered lifeboat was the only one of its type, designed for close shore work within an estuary, and was effectively the first Inshore-lifeboat of the RNLI. The new boat cost £1,893, and was funded from the legacy of the late Mrs. Helen Blake, of Handcross, Sussex. The official lifeboat naming ceremony was postponed due to the outbreak of World War II, but the boat was duly named Helen Blake (ON 809).

The Helen Blake was launched at 22:35 on the 28 August 1954, following reports of 2 men in a small yacht shouting for help near the North Bull Lighthouse. Arriving on scene, they found the yacht Libera tied fast, and two men clinging to the lighthouse ladder. Both men were rescued, and the yacht towed ashore.

Poolbeg Lifeboat Station was closed in 1959. It was decided that the motor-powered lifeboats stationed at Dún Laoghaire to the south, and Howth to the north, could now easily cover the area, and the need for a lifeboat at Poolbeg had diminished. It had been four years since the last call in 1955. Between 1862 and 1959, the Poolbeg lifeboat was launched 53 times, and saved 59 people. The Helen Blake was sold from service, but was later fully restored, and is now on display in the RNLI Heritage Collection at Chatham Historic Dockyard.

== Station honours ==
The following are awards made at Poolbeg.

- RNLI Gold Medal

Lt. John Arthur Wellesley O'Neill Torrens, 2nd Dragoons (Royal Scots Greys) – 1881

- RNLI Silver Medal

Mr. Henry Lawrence Cox, Surgeon, Army Medical Department – 1881
William Smith, Bombardier, RA – 1881
Patrick Reilly, Private, Army Service Corps – 1881
Francis Howard, Private, 57th Regt. of Foot – 1881

Daniel Evans, Coxswain – 1882
Samuel Carr, Chief Officer, H.M. Coastguard & Honorary Secretary, Poolbeg RNLI – 1882

- The Thanks of the Institution inscribed on Vellum

B. W. Jackson, chief engineer, of the Govt. hired steamer Stanley – 1881

== Poolbeg lifeboats ==
=== Pulling and Sailing (P&S) lifeboats ===
ON (Note: ON is the RNLI's Official Number of the boat.)	Name	Built	On station	Class	Comments
Pre-391	Unnamed	1862	1862–1866	30-foot Peake Self-righting (P&S)	(Note: 30-foot x 7-foot 2in (6-oared) Peake-class self-righting (P&S) lifeboat, built by Forrestt of Limehouse, London, costing £152.)
Pre-470	G. V. Brooke	1866	1866–1881	32-foot Prowse Self-righting (P&S)	(Note: 32-foot x 7-foot (10-oared) Prowse-class self-righting (P&S) lifeboat, gift of the friends of G. V. Brooke, built by Forrestt of Limehouse, London, costing £260.)
292	Aaron Stark Symes	1881	1881–1897	34-foot Self-righting (P&S)	(Note: 34-foot x 8-foot (10-oared) self-righting (P&S) lifeboat, gift of the late Mrs E. Symes of Ballyhack, County Dublin, built by Woolfe & Son of Shadwell, costing £363.)
126	Rochdale	1887	1897–1902	34-foot Self-righting (P&S)	(Note: 34-foot x 8-foot (10-oared) self-righting (P&S) lifeboat, gift of the Rochdale LB fund, built by Forrestt of Limehouse, London, costing £480.); Reserve lifeboat No. D9, previously at West Hartlepool, and Point of Ayr.
481	Richard Cresswell	1902	1902–1910	29-foot 1in Whaleboat	(Note: 29-foot 1in x 6-foot 7in (6-oared) Whaleboat, legacy of Mrs E. A. C. Cresswell of Egham, built by J. Atkinson, costing £392.)
615	John Watson Wakefield	1910	1910–1938	30-foot Whaleboat	(Note: 30-foot x 7-foot 3in (8-oared) Whaleboat, legacy of Mrs J. Wakefield of Kilcullen, built by Thames Ironworks of Blackwall, London, costing £593.)

Pre ON numbers are unofficial numbers used by the Lifeboat Enthusiast Society to reference early lifeboats not included on the official RNLI list.

=== Motor lifeboat ===
ON	Name	Built	On station	Class	Comments
809	Helen Blake	1938	1938–1959	Harbour-class	(Note: 28-foot x 8-foot Harbour-class, with a single 20-hp Hyland petrol-engine, legacy of Mrs H.Blake, built by Groves and Guttridge of Cowes, costing £1,893.)

== See also ==
- List of RNLI stations
- List of former RNLI stations
- Royal National Lifeboat Institution lifeboats
