= Pigeon House =

Pigeon House may refer to:

- A dovecote
- The former Pigeon House generating station in Dublin, Ireland: see Poolbeg Generating Station
