= Dún Laoghaire Lifeboat Station =

RNLI lifeboat station in County Dublin, Ireland

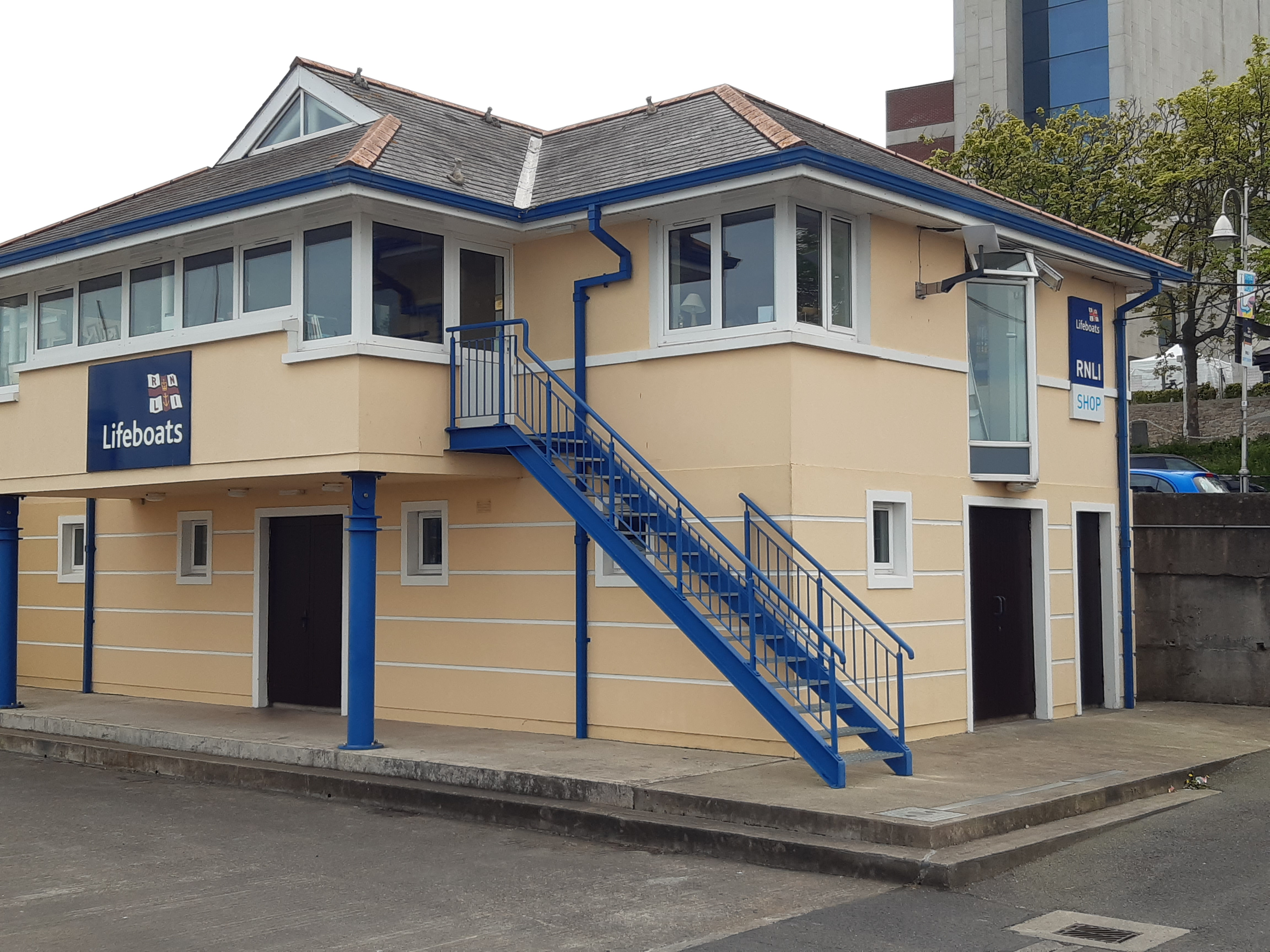
- Dún Laoghaire Lifeboat Station

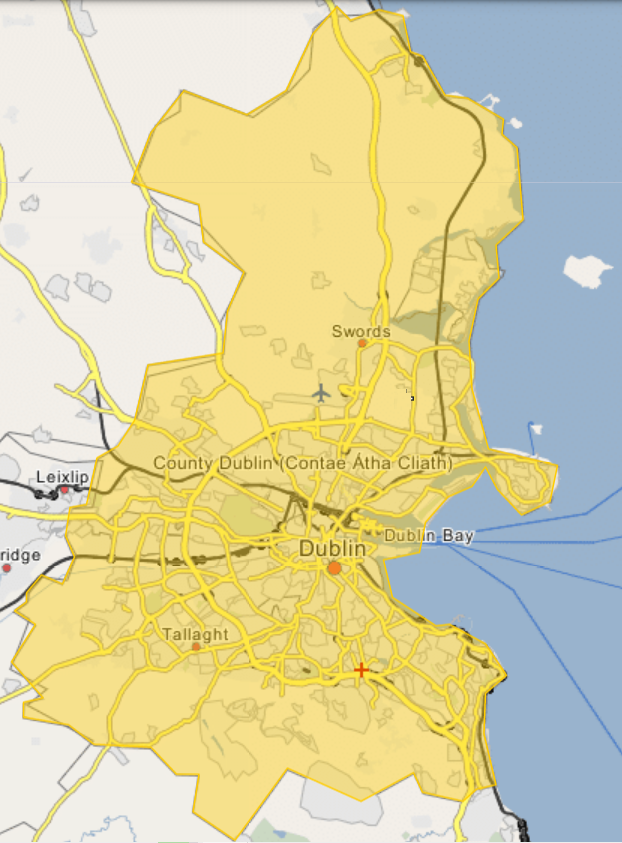
- Location within County Dublin
- Former names: Kingstown Lifeboat Station

General information
- Type: RNLI Lifeboat Station
- Location: 2 Queen's Rd, Dún Laoghaire, County Dublin, A96 X240, Ireland
- Coordinates: 53°17′37.3″N 6°07′51.5″W
- Opened: 1817–1862 Dublin Ballast Board; 1862–present RNLI
- Owner: Royal National Lifeboat Institution

Website
- Dún Laoghaire RNLI Lifeboat Station

Dún Laoghaire Lifeboat Station is located at Queen's Road, in Dún Laoghaire , a seaside and harbour town formerly known as Kingstown, in the administrative region of Dún Laoghaire–Rathdown, historically County Dublin, approximately 11 km (6.8 mi) south east of Dublin, on the east coast of Ireland.

A lifeboat was first stationed at Dún Laoghaire in 1817 by the Corporation and Port of Dublin (Dublin Ballast Board). Management of the Kingstown Lifeboat Station was transferred to the Royal National Lifeboat Institution (RNLI) in 1862.

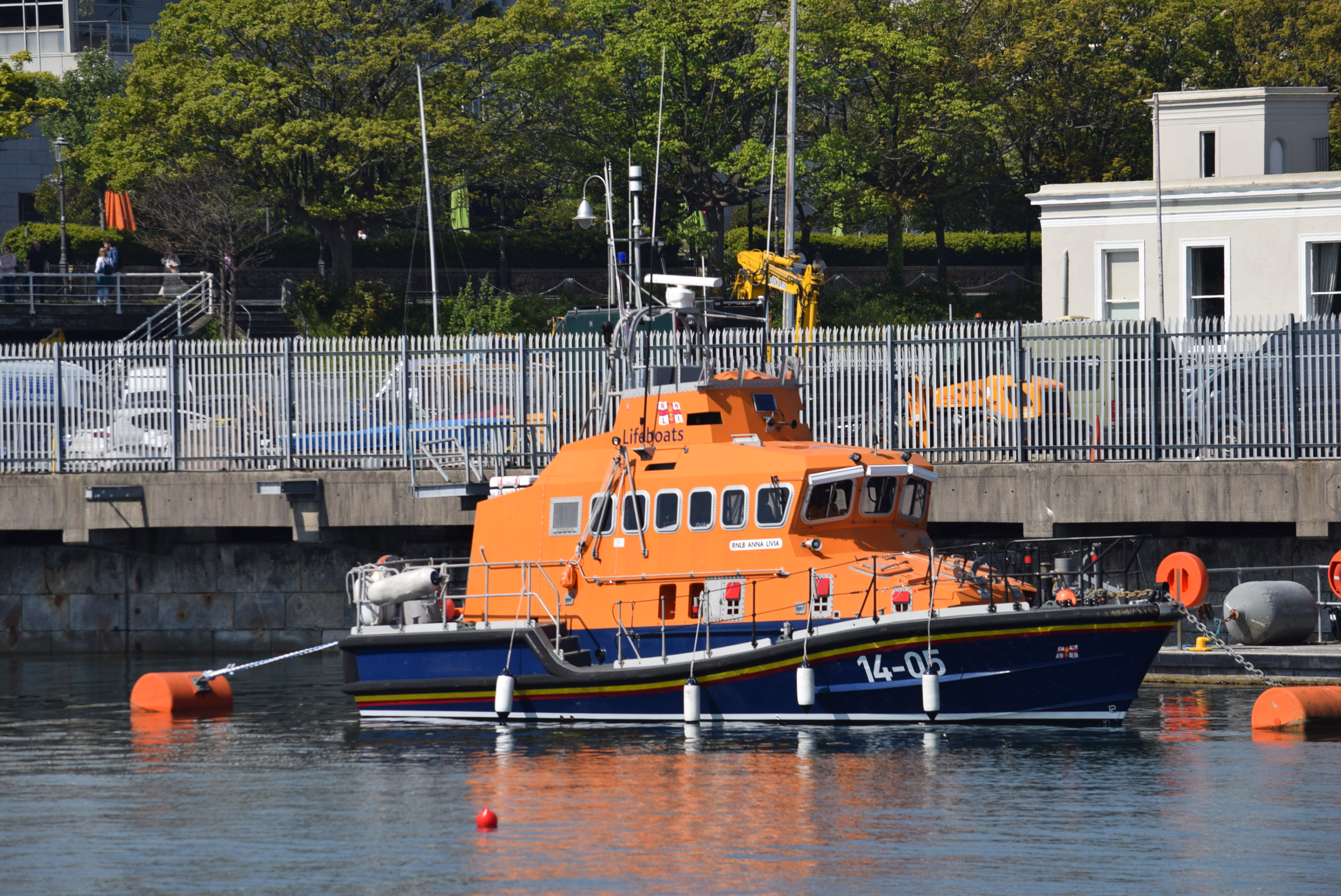
Dún Laoghaire Trent-class lifeboat 14-05 Anna Livia (ON 1200)

The station currently operates a Trent-class All-weather lifeboat, 14-05 Anna Livia (ON 1200), on station since 1995, and a smaller D-class (IB1) Inshore lifeboat, Joval (D-865), on station since 2022.

== History ==
From 1801, a number of lifeboats were placed in and around the Dublin Bay area by the Corporation and Port of Dublin.

- Clontarf (1801)
- Sandycove (1803)
- Poolbeg (Pigeon House) (1804)
- Bulloch (1808)
- Sutton (1817)
- Old Dunleary (1817)
- Howth (1817)
- Kingstown Asylum Harbour (1823)

Following the visit by King George IV in 1821, Old Dunleary was renamed Kingstown.

On 28 December 1821, the Sandycove lifeboat was called to the aid of the brig Ellen of Liverpool, driven ashore at Kingstown and wrecked. After rescuing the crew, a large wave washed six lifeboatmen out of the boat. Only three men were recovered to the boat. Now with no oars, a fourth lifeboatman was lost, as the lifeboat was driven into the breakers, but everyone else, including the crew of the Ellen, managed to scramble ashore.

The brig Duke was driven ashore at Dalkey on 14 August 1829, when on passage from Whitehaven to Dublin. With his crew of three coastguard and nine fishermen, Lt. William Hutchinson set out through the breaking surf, and rescued five men, three women, and three children from the vessel, moments before it broke up completely. The Royal National Institution for the Preservation of Life from Shipwreck awarded Lt. Hutchinson with the RNIPLS Gold Medal.

The storm of 8 and 9 February 1861 was disastrous for shipping around the British Isles. Over 250 vessels are recorded as lost over two days on the List of shipwrecks in February 1861. The brig Neptune was wrecked at Kingstown, with the loss of six of her seven crew. The schooner Industry was also wrecked, with the loss of four of her five crew. No fewer than six medals for gallantry were awarded for the attempted rescues of these crew, but not without cost. Capt. J. McNeill Boyd, RN, of HMS Ajax, was posthumously awarded the RNLI Silver Medal, after he and his crew of five men, J. Curry, A. Forsyth, J. Johnson, T. Murphy and J. Russell, were washed from the pier and drowned.

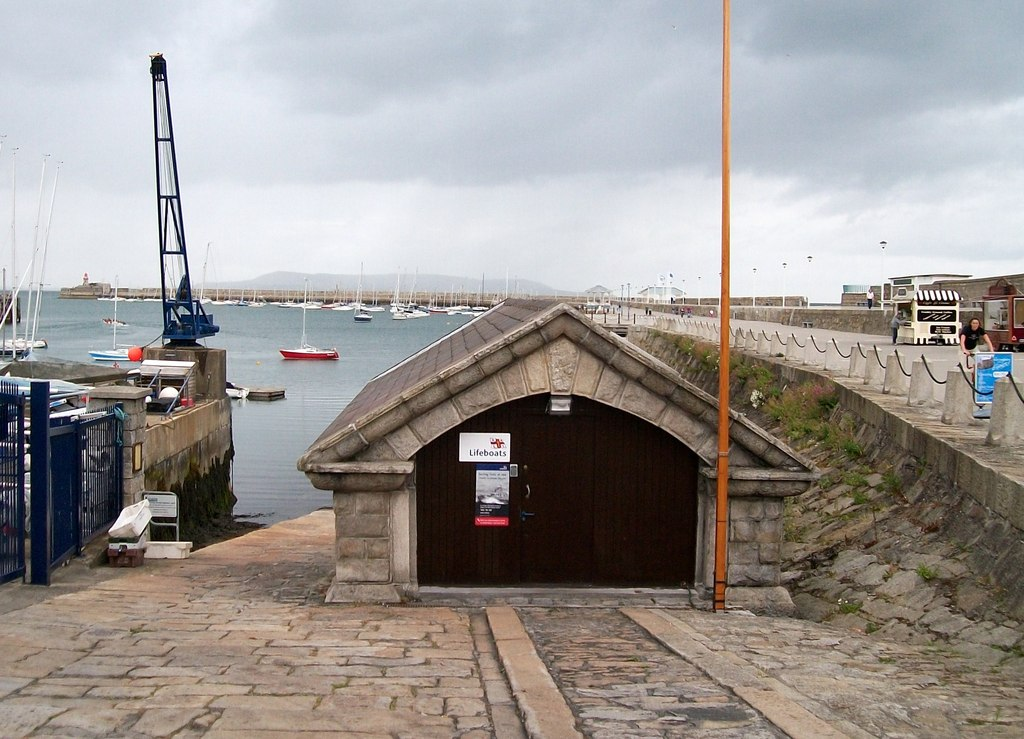
1862 Lifeboat House next to East Pier

In early 1862, the Ballast Corporation of Dublin made a request to the RNLI to take over the management of their three remaining lifeboat stations, Howth, Poolbeg and Kingstown, which was agreed. The Ballast Corporation agreed to contribute £50 of the annual cost of the station.

A new fully equipped 34 ft (10 m) self-righting 'Pulling and Sailing' (P&S) lifeboat, one with oars and sails, named Princess Royal, was provided to Kingstown, arriving on station in March 1862. A new carriage for transportation was also provided, and a new boathouse was constructed of granite. Doors were built at both ends, so the lifeboat could be launched directly into the harbour, or relocated using the carriage.

Second Coxswain Thomas White died of injuries sustained, when the lifeboat capsized on 30 September 1876, having just rescued the crew of the brig Leonie. All 19 occupants were thrown into the sea, and three of the crew of the Leonie also drowned. Crewman Bernard Mundone died the following year.

It was decided in 1890, that a second lifeboat be placed at Kingstown. The No.2 station became operational when the 42 ft (13 m) self-righting (P&S) lifeboat Civil Service No.7 (ON 289) was placed on service. On a night exercise on 23 December 1892, the lifeboat was washed onto the rocks, and crewman Patrick Hammond lost his life.

== Kingstown Lifeboat Disaster ==
The Kingstown Lifeboat Disaster is well documented, and the few lines here cannot begin to represent the full story of that day. In the storm of 24 December 1895, the Russian barque Palme, on passage from Liverpool to South America, was seeking shelter in Dublin Bay. With her anchor dragging, and in danger of being driven ashore, the Kingstown No.2 lifeboat Civil Service No.7 (ON 289) was launched, with a full complement of 12 crew, plus Coxswain, Second Coxswain and Bowman.

In full public view, when just 600 yards (550 m) from the Palme, a huge wave capsized the lifeboat. It didn't self-right, maybe due to damage to the air-boxes. All 15 lifeboat men were lost. Efforts to launch the Palme's ship's boat, to rescue the rescuers, failed, when it was smashed by the waves.

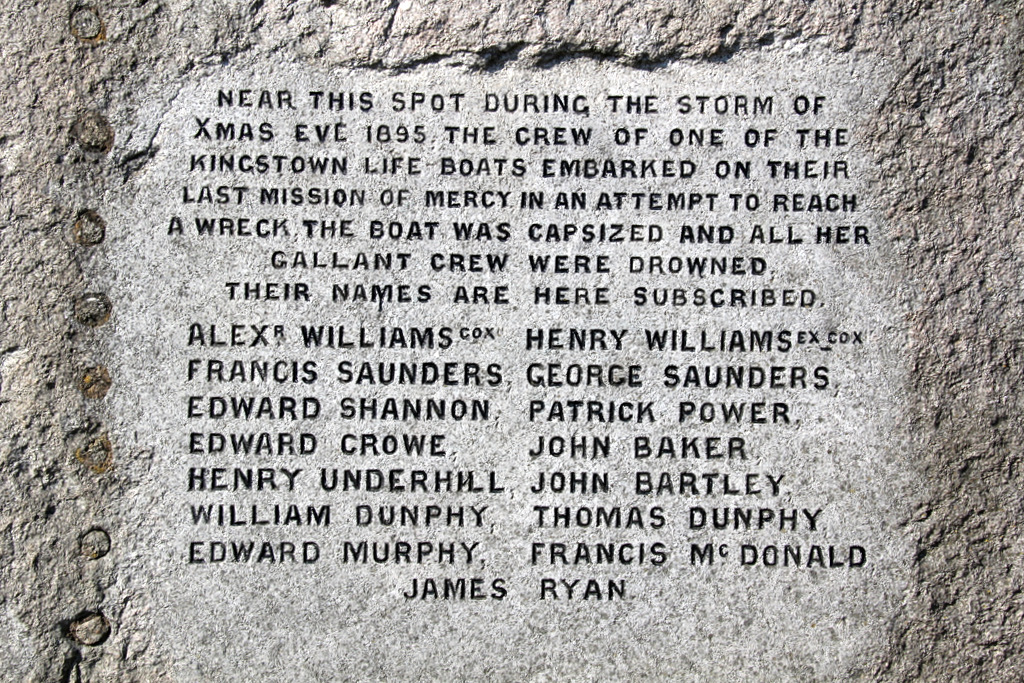
Kingstown No.2 Lifeboat memorial

The Kingstown No. 1 Lifeboat Hannah Pickard (ON 308) was also launched, with nine lifeboat men, and six men from HMS Melampus. It too was capsized, although this time, the No. 1 lifeboat self-righted, and all the crew managed to regain the boat. Sighting the upturned No.2 lifeboat, they continued to search for survivors for 45 minutes, until oars were lost in the terrible conditions, and the No. 1 lifeboat was driven ashore at Blackrock. Further attempts by the Poolbeg lifeboat Aaron Stark Symes (ON 292), and two tug boats, also failed to reach the lifeboat men or the stricken vessel, and the Palme, for now, was left to her fate.

The following day, the steamship Tearaght managed to reach the vessel, and all twenty people on board, along with the ship's cat, were saved. Capt. Thomas McCombie of the Tearaght was awarded the RNLI Gold Medal. A fund for the families of the lifeboat men lost was set up, with £2,200 coming from the Institution. £300 was given to the families by the Russian Government. The Civil Service No.7 was beyond repair, and the No. 2 station was closed for the next three years. A granite memorial sitting by the current lifeboat station records the names of those men lost.

== 1900 onwards ==
A new lifeboat house and slipway, costing £2,350, was constructed in 1901, for a new No.2 Lifeboat, which was another lifeboat funded by the Civil Service, and named Dunleary (Civil Service No.7) (ON 409). The No. 2 station would become the primary station in 1911, when the No.1 lifeboat Hannah Pickard (ON 308) was withdrawn from service, and the No.1 station closed.

In 1917, the lifeboat house and slipway were modified, at a cost of £1,550, in preparation for the arrival of the first motor-powered lifeboat to be placed at Kingstown. In 1919, a 45-foot Watson-class lifeboat, costing £6,074, with a 60-bhp 'Tylor D1' 6-cylinder petrol-engine, was placed at Kingstown, again taking the name Dunleary (Civil Service No.7) (ON 658).

In 1920, the town of Kingstown would revert to its original name, this time taking the Irish form Dún Laoghaire, rather than the anglicised "Dunleary". It is not known whether the name of the lifeboat station was changed at the same time, but from this point, it shall be referred to as Dún Laoghaire Lifeboat Station.

Acting Second Coxswain W. Kelly was accorded 'The Thanks of the Institution inscribed on Vellum' in 1947, when, in temporary command of the Dún Laoghaire lifeboat Dunleary II (ON 814), 45 lives were saved from the M.V. Bolivar. The vessel had been wrecked on the Kish Bank, 7.5 miles (12.1 km) from Kingstown, and had broken in two. The owners awarded 100 guineas to the Dún Laoghaire Lifeboat Station.

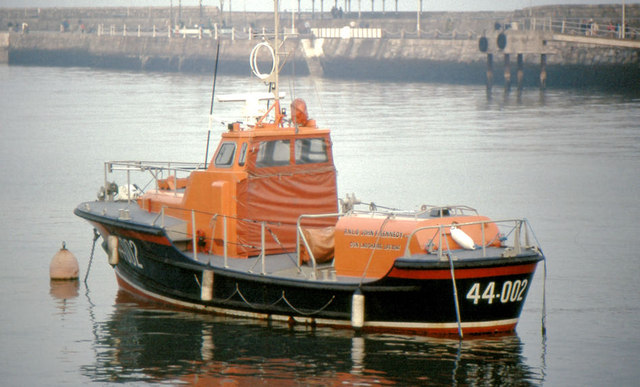
Dún Laoghaire Waveney-class lifeboat 44-002 John F. Kennedy (ON 1001)

Dunleary II was launched in 1956 to the aid of the harbour launch, which had capsized, but to no avail. The three people aboard the launch drowned, one being Capt. R. S. Kearon, Honorary Secretary of Dún Laoghaire lifeboat station.

Coxswain/Mechanic Eric Offer was awarded the RNLI Bronze Medal, for the rescue of two men, after their dinghy capsized at the coal harbour on 15 June 1969. He would also share the Maud Smith Award, for the bravest act of life-saving in 1969, with Coxswain William Sheader of Scarborough.

A D-class (EA16) Inshore lifeboat (D-317) was also placed on service at Dún Laoghaire in 1986. The former No.1 lifeboat house, built in 1862 and located next to the East Pier, was subsequently re-commissioned, and is now the Inshore lifeboat house.

2025 marked the 30th anniversary of the arrival of the Trent-class lifeboat 14-05 Anna Livia (On 1200), which arrived at Dún Laoghaire on 29 June 1995. The lifeboat was funded by gifts and legacies, and from the Dublin Bay Lifeboat Fund.

== Station honours ==
The following are awards made at Kingstown / Dún Laoghaire:

- RNIPLS Gold Medal
  Lt. William Hutchinson, RN, H.M. Coastguard, Kingstown – 1829
- RNLI Gold Medal
  Thomas McCombie, Captain of the Irish Lights vessel SS Tearaght – 1896
- RNIPLS Silver Medal
  John Ridge, Second mate of the Revenue Cutter Kite – 1844
- RNLI Silver Medal
  Capt. J. McNeill Boyd, RN, HMS Ajax – 1861 (posthumous)
  Lt. Hugh McNeill Dyer, RN, HMS Ajax – 1861
  George Farrin, master gunner, HMS Ajax – 1861
  James Toomey - 1861
  Lt. Richard Parsons, 35th Regiment of Foot – 1861
  Lt. William Hutchinson Jr., Royal Dublin City Militia – 1861
  Edmund Gray – 1868
  John Freeney, coachman – 1868
  H. Williams, Coxswain – 1881
  Lt. Alexander John Lindsay, RA – 1881
- RNLI Bronze Medal
  Eric Thomas Offer, Coxswain/Mechanic – 1969
- The Maud Smith Award 1969
  (for the bravest act of lifesaving during the year by a member of a lifeboat crew), awarded jointly to:
  Eric Thomas Offer, Coxswain/Mechanic – 1970
  (and William Sheader, Coxswain at Scarborough – 1970)
- 'The Thanks of the Institution inscribed on Vellum'
  W. Kelly, Acting Second Coxswain – 1947
  Eamon O’Leary – 1990
  Ken Robertson, Coxswain – 2007
  Wayne Farrell, crew member – 2007
- Vellum Service Certificates
  Patrick Boyd, Second Coxswain – 2007
  Kieran O’Connell, Mechanic – 2007
  Chris Watson, crew Member – 2007
  Gary Hayes, crew Member – 2007
  Rory Bolton, crew Member – 2007
- A special certificate on Vellum
  Dr Niall L. Webb, honorary medical adviser – 1980
- £30, awarded by Rudolf, Crown Prince of Austria
  for the rescue of 12 people from the Austrian brig Olinka.
  Kingstown Lifeboat Crew – 1878
- Binocular Glass
  Master McCombie, son of the Captain of the Irish Lights vessel SS Tearaght – 1896

== Roll of honour ==
In memory of those lost whilst serving Kingstown / Dún Laoghaire lifeboats:

- Washed away and lost from the Sandycove lifeboat, whilst on service to the brig Ellen, 28 December 1821.
  Hugh Byrne
  Thomas Fitzsimons
  John Archbold
  Thomas Grimes
- Lifeboat capsized whilst returning from the wreck of the brig Leonie, 30 September 1876
  Thomas White, Second Coxswain
  Bernard Mundone, died in 1877
  (Three of the crew of the brig also drowned)
- Died when the No.2 lifeboat was wrecked on the rocks whilst on night exercise, 23 December 1892.

Patrick Hammond

- Lost when the No.2 Lifeboat Civil Service No.7 was wrecked whilst on service to the SS Palme of Finland, 24 December 1895

Alexander Williams, Coxswain (35)
John Baker (33)
John Bartley (45)
Edward Crowe (30)
Thomas Dunphy (31)
William Dunphy (40)
Francis McDonald (27)
Edward Murphy (30)

Patrick Power (22)
James Ryan (24)
Francis Saunders (27)
George Saunders (30)
Edward Shannon (28)
Henry Underhill (32)
Henry Williams (60)

- Alleged to have died of consumption contracted through exposure on service, 1905
  Patrick Crowe, Second Coxswain

== Dún Laoghaire lifeboats ==
=== Dublin Ballast Board lifeboats ===
ON (Note: ON is the RNLI's Official Number of the boat.)	Name	Built	On station	Class	Comments
–	Unnamed	1816	c.1817–c.1831	North Country lifeboat	(Note: North Country non-self-righting lifeboat, built by Jn. Clements of Dublin, costing £100.); Previously at Pigeon House. Transferred to Sutton (Dublin).
–	Unnamed	1805	1831–1834	North Country lifeboat	(Note: North Country non-self-righting lifeboat, funded by Harbour Dues, built by Jn. Clements of Dublin, costing £75 when new.); Previously at Sandy Cove and Sutton (Dublin).
Pre-281	Unnamed	1854	1854–1862	30-foot Peake self-righting (P&S)	(Note: 30 ft 0 in (9.14 m) x 8 ft 0 in (2.44 m) (10-oared) Peake-class self-righting (P&S) lifeboat, built by Forrestt of Limehouse, London, costing £150.); Adopted by the RNLI in 1862. Transferred to Hastings.

Pre ON numbers are unofficial numbers used by the Lifeboat Enthusiasts' Society to reference early lifeboats not included on the official RNLI list.

=== Dún Laoghaire (No.1 Station) ===
ON	Name	Built	On station	Class	Comments
Pre-397	Princess Royal	1862	1862–1867	34-foot Peake self-righting (P&S)	(Note: 34 ft 0 in (10.36 m) x 7 ft 0 in (2.13 m) (12-oared) Peake-class self-righting (P&S) lifeboat, legacy of Miss S. H. Bertie Cator, of Sussex Square, London, built by Forrestt of Limehouse, London, costing £205.); Unserviceable by 1867.
Pre-501	Princess Royal	1867	1867–1879	32-foot Prowse self-righting (P&S)	(Note: 32 ft 0 in (9.75 m) x 7 ft 6 in (2.29 m) (10-oared) Prowse-class self-righting (P&S) lifeboat, legacy of Miss S. H. Bertie Cator, of Sussex Square, London, built by Woolfe of Shadwell, London, costing £246.); Broken up in 1880.
Pre-639	Hector	1878	1879–1891	37-foot self-righting (P&S)	(Note: 37 ft 0 in (11.28 m) x 8 ft 6 in (2.59 m) (12-oared) self-righting (P&S) lifeboat, legacy of Miss Anderson, and gift of Mrs Goff, of London, built by Woolfe of Shadwell, London, costing £412.); Sold in 1891.
308	Hannah Pickard	1891	1891–1911	37-foot self-righting (P&S)	(Note: 37 ft 0 in (11.28 m) x 8 ft 0 in (2.44 m) (12-oared) self-righting (P&S) lifeboat, legacy of Mr A. Pickard of Leeds, built by Forrestt of Limehouse, London, costing £527.); Capsized 24 December 1895. Broken up in 1911.

Station Closed, 1911

=== Dún Laoghaire No.2 Station ===
ON	Name	Built	On station	Class	Comments
289	Civil Service No.7	1890	1890–1895	42-foot self-righting (P&S)	(Note: 42 ft 0 in (12.80 m) x 11 ft 0 in (3.35 m) (12-oared) self-righting (P&S) lifeboat, funded by the Civil Service LB fund, built by Woolfe of Shadwell, London, costing £706.); Capsized on service on 24 December 1895, with the loss of 15 crew. Damaged beyond repair.
Station Closed 1895–1898
409	Dunleary (Civil Service No.7)	1898	1898–1913	45-foot Watson (P&S)	(Note: 45 ft 0 in (13.72 m) x 12 ft 6 in (3.81 m) (10-oared) Watson-class non-self-righting (P&S) lifeboat, funded by the Civil Service LB fund, built by Hollwey of Dublin, costing £958.); Condemned and sold in 1913.
517	Dunleary	1904	1913–1919	43-foot Watson (P&S)	(Note: 43 ft 0 in (13.11 m) x 12 ft 6 in (3.81 m) (10-oared) Watson-class non-self-righting (P&S) lifeboat, funded by the Civil Service LB fund, built by Thames Ironworks, of Blackwall, London, costing £1,711 when new.); Previously Ann Fawcett at Harwich. Sold in 1920.

=== Motor lifeboats ===
ON	Op.No. (Note: Op. No. is the RNLI's Operational Number of the boat carried on the hull.)	Name	Built	On station	Class	Comments
658	–	Dunleary (Civil Service No.7)	1919	1919–1938	45-foot Watson	Transferred to Lytham St Annes.
814	–	Dunleary II	1938	1938–1967	46-foot Watson	Transferred to Lochinver.
1001	44-002	John F. Kennedy	1966	1967–1990	Waveney	
1036	44-015	Lady of Lancashire	1974	1990–1995	Waveney	Previously at Fleetwood.
1200	14-05	Anna Livia	1995	1995–	Trent	

More post-service details can be found on the respective lifeboat class pages.

=== Inshore lifeboats ===
==== D class ====
Op.No.	Name	On station	Class	Comments
D-317	Unnamed	1986–1993	D-class (EA16)	
D-441	Irish Diver	1993–2001	D-class (EA16)	
D-565	Tony Heard	2001–2009	D-class (EA16)	
D-532	Kingsand	2009–2010	D-class (EA16)	
D-731	Réalt na Mara	2010–2022	D-class (IB1)	
D-865	Joval	2022–	D-class (IB1)	

== See also ==
- List of RNLI stations
- List of former RNLI stations
- Royal National Lifeboat Institution lifeboats
