= Howth Lifeboat Station =

RNLI lifeboat station in County Dublin, Ireland

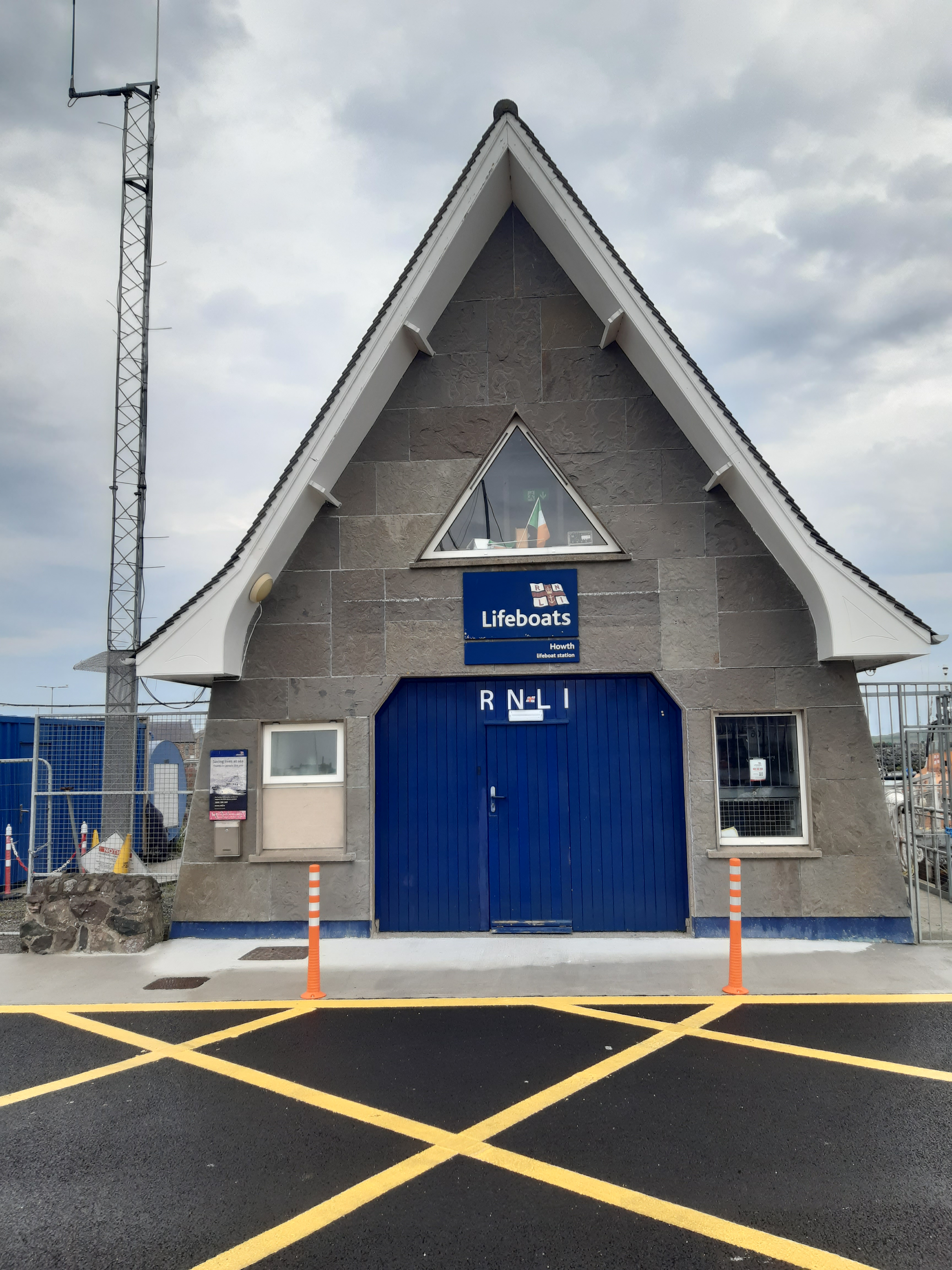
- Howth Lifeboat Station

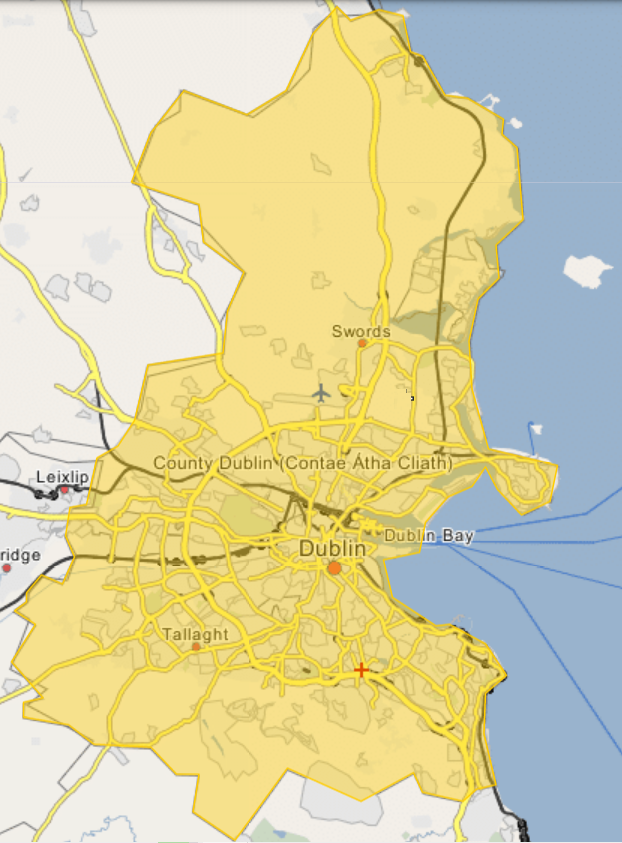
- Location within County Dublin

General information
- Type: RNLI Lifeboat Station
- Location: Middle Pier, Howth Harbour, Howth, County Dublin, Ireland
- Coordinates: 53°23′22.6″N 6°04′05.6″W
- Opened: 1817–1862 Dublin Ballast Board; 1862–present RNLI
- Owner: Royal National Lifeboat Institution

Website
- Howth RNLI Lifeboat Station

Howth Lifeboat Station sits on the middle pier at Howth Harbour in the fishing village of Howth, on Howth Head, a peninsula located on the north side of Dublin Bay, in the administrative region of Fingal, historically County Dublin, on the east coast of Ireland.

A lifeboat was first stationed at Howth in 1817 by the Corporation and Port of Dublin. Management of the station was transferred to the Royal National Lifeboat Institution (RNLI) in 1862.

The station currently operates a Trent-class All-weather lifeboat, 14-33 Roy Barker III (ON 1258), on station since 2002, and the D-class (IB1) Inshore lifeboat Aideen Cresswell (D-796), on station since 2016.

== History ==
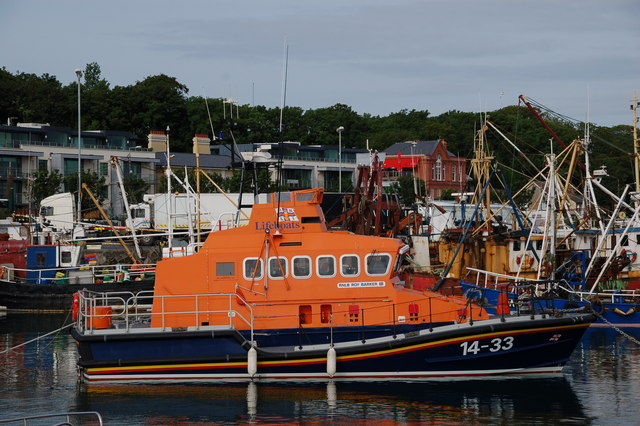
Howth Trent-class lifeboat 14-33 Roy Barker III (ON 1258)

The first lifeboat to be placed at Howth was operated by the Ballast Corporation of Dublin. In early 1862, the Ballast Corporation made a request to the RNLI to take over the management of their three lifeboat stations, located at Poolbeg, Kingstown and Howth, which was agreed. Sir George Bowles, a new fully equipped 30 ft (9.1 m) self-righting 'Pulling and Sailing' (P&S) lifeboat, one with oars and sails, was provided to Howth, arriving on station in September 1862. A new carriage for transportation was also provided, along with a new boathouse, which was constructed on the West Pier, at a cost of £205. The Ballast Corporation agreed to contribute £50 of the annual cost of the station.

In 1863, the Howth lifeboat capsized whilst on exercise. Fortunately, no lives were lost.

The Howth lifeboat was launched on 15 October 1865 to the lugger Castletown of Belfast, after she struck a rock near Ireland's Eye. The lifeboat managed to save the seven crew as well as the vessel, for which the master recorded that he was "truly thankful for the services rendered by the life-boat in saving his property from destruction".

The barque Eva, with eight crew, was on passage from Dublin to Ardrossan, when she was driven ashore and wrecked on Baldoyle Strand, in the south-easterly gale of 25 March 1877. Five of the crew managed to get away in the ship's boat. In difficult conditions, the Howth lifeboat Clara Baker arrived to find three men still lashed to the rigging as the sea broke over the vessel. All three were rescued. For this service, and with acknowledgement of previous rescues, including the Castletown in 1865, Coxswain John White was awarded the RNLI Silver Medal.

On 22 October 1881, the ship George H. Oulton of Saint John, New Brunswick ran aground on the North Bull, off Clontarf, Dublin. The Howth lifeboat Clara Baker was launched at 08:00 into a south-east gale, and 16 crew were rescued. Nine days later, 11 riggers undertaking salvage work were rescued from the same vessel in a joint effort by the Poolbeg and Kingstown lifeboats. Four RNLI Silver Medals were awarded to crew of the Poolbeg and Kingstown lifeboats.

In 1894, the RNLI received a legacy of £50,000 from the estate of Mr James Stevens, a developer, from Edgbaston in Birmingham. This donation provided 20 lifeboats, more lifeboats than any other single donation received by the RNLI. The James Stevens No.7 (ON 429) was placed on service at Howth in 1899. The boat was kept afloat, and the old boathouse was handed over to the Board of Public Works. The boathouse still stands on the West Pier.

Howth would see the arrival of its first motor-powered lifeboat in 1930, the 40-foot 6in Watson Lady Kylsant (ON 721). Now able to cover significantly greater distances at much higher speeds, it would bring about the closure of the Skerries lifeboat station, approximately 30 km (19 mi) to the north.

On the night of 14 July 1964, relief lifeboat H. F. Bailey (ON 777) was launched into a southerly gale, to the aid of the fishing boat Ros Cairbre, being swept ashore after engine failure. After travelling 4 km (2.5 mi) in very rough seas, the vessel was found in Freshwater Bay, and towed to Howth. Coxswain Joseph McLoughlin was awarded the RNLI Bronze Medal.

== 1967 onwards ==
In 1964, in response to an increasing amount of water-based leisure activity, the RNLI placed 25 small fast Inshore lifeboats around the country. These were easily launched with just a few people, ideal to respond quickly to local emergencies. More stations were opened, and in 1967, a D-class (RFD PB16) Inshore lifeboat (D-129) was additionally placed at Howth. The cost of the boat had been defrayed by a donation from the Boy Scouts of Ireland Jubilee Fund.

A new station building was constructed on Howth Middle Pier in 1984, on reclaimed land from the 1982 harbour development. In 2016, a new pontoon berth was constructed alongside the lifeboat house.

On 11 March 2002, the Trent-class lifeboat 14-33 Roy Barker III (ON 1258) was placed on service. Mr Frederick Roy Barker (1909–1992), known as Roy, left his entire estate to the RNLI, known as the Roy Barker Memorial Fund, with the request that all income be used to fund lifeboats. Howth received one of three Trent-class lifeboats from the fund.

In 2016, Howth would receive their latest Inshore lifeboat, the €71,000 D-class (IB1) lifeboat funded from the bequest of the late Mrs Aideen Cresswell, latterly of Howth, who died in 2011, aged 91. At a ceremony on 2 October 2016, the lifeboat was named Aideen Cresswell (D-796).

== Station honours ==
The following are awards made at Howth:

- RNIPLS Silver Medal
  Thomas Jones, Second Mate of the Packet Escape – 1832
- RNLI Silver Medal
  John White, Coxswain – 1877
  Thomas Rickard, seaman of the vessel Storm King – 1897
  George Caulfield, seaman of the vessel Storm King – 1897
  James McLaughlan, seaman of the vessel Maymaid – 1897
  C Kelly, seaman of the vessel Maymaid – 1897
  Edward Rourke, seaman of the vessel Maymaid – 1897
- RNLI Bronze Medal
  Petty Officer Charles Slater, H.M. Coastguard, Howth – 1919
  Patrick Rickard, shop assistant – 1919
  Joseph McLoughlin, Coxswain – 1964
  Frank Hendy, boatman, Howth Yacht Club – 1976
- 'The Thanks of the Institution inscribed on Vellum'
  Tony Brown, member of the public – 1976
  Robert Duffy, Coxswain – 1995
  George Duffy, Second Coxswain/Mechanic – 1996
  Ian Sheridan, Deputy Second Coxswain/Assistant Mechanic – 1996
- 'A Framed Letter of Thanks signed by the Chairman of the Institution'
  Eamonn Howard, crew member – 1996
  Michael Duffy, crew member – 1996
  Jim Duffy, crew member – 1996
  Mr Patrick Kelly, a member of the public – 1996
  Robert Duffy, Coxswain – 1998
  George Duffy, Second Coxswain – 1998
  Ian Sheridan, Assistant Mechanic – 1998
  Frederick Connolly, crew member – 1998
  Damian Cronin, crew member – 1998
  Eamonn Howard, crew member – 1998
  David Howard, crew member – 1998
  Brian McConkey, crew member – 1998
- 'A Letter of Thanks signed by the Chairman of the Institution'
  Flight Lieutenant Henry Pottle – 1996
  Flight Lieutenant Patrick Thirkell – 1996
  Flight Sergeant Alan Falconer – 1996
  (all aircrew of Helicopter Rescue 122)

== Roll of honour ==
In memory of those lost whilst serving at Howth:

- Died of a heart attack when answering the maroons, 1949
  Patrick Rourke

== Howth lifeboats ==
=== Dublin Ballast Board lifeboats ===
| Name | Built | On station | Class | Comments |
|---|---|---|---|---|
| Unnamed | 1817 | 1817–c.1843 | 27-foot 6in North Country lifeboat | (Note: 27 ft 6 in (8.38 m) x 7 ft 6 in (2.29 m) (10-oared) North Country non-self-righting lifeboat, funded from Harbour Dues, built by Jn. Clements of Dublin, costing £100.) |
| Unnamed | 1842 | c.1842–1851 | 27-foot 6in North Country lifeboat | (Note: 27 ft 6 in (8.38 m) x 7 ft 6 in (2.29 m) (10-oared) North Country non-self-righting lifeboat, funded from Harbour Dues. Maker and cost unknown.) |
| Unnamed | 1851 | 1851–1862 | 30-foot Whaleboat | (Note: 30 ft 0 in (9.14 m) x 8 ft 0 in (2.44 m) non-self-righting Whaleboat, built by Forrestt of Limehouse, London, costing £150.); Sold in 1862. |

=== Pulling and Sailing (P&S) lifeboats ===
| ON (Note: ON is the RNLI's Official Number of the boat.) | Name | Built | On station | Class | Comments |
|---|---|---|---|---|---|
| Pre-395 | Sir George Bowles | 1862 | 1862–1872 | 30-foot Peake self-righting (P&S) | (Note: 30 ft 0 in (9.14 m) x 7 ft 0 in (2.13 m) (6-oared) Peake-class self-righting (P&S) lifeboat, gift of Gen. Sir G. Bowles of London, built by Forrestt of Limehouse, London, costing £185.); Capsized 20 March 1863. Broken up in 1872. |
| Pre-556 | Clara Baker | 1871 | 1872–1886 | 33-foot Peake self-righting (P&S) | (Note: 33 ft 0 in (10.06 m) x 8 ft 0 in (2.44 m) (10-oared) self-righting (P&S) lifeboat, gift of 'a friend', as per Miss C. Baker of Lowndes Square, built by Woolfe of Shadwell, London, costing £285.); Transferred to the Relief fleet. Sold in 1894. |
| 97 | Tom and Ida Smithies | 1886 | 1886–1899 | 34-foot self-righting (P&S) | (Note: 34 ft 0 in (10.36 m) x 8 ft 0 in (2.44 m) (10-oared) self-righting (P&S) lifeboat, legacy of Miss E. Smithies of Tollington Park, London, built by Woolfe of Shadwell, London, costing £336.); Transferred to the Relief fleet (Reserve No. D6), used for demonstration purposes. Broken up in 1912. |
| 429 | James Stevens No.7 | 1899 | 1899–1912 | 45-foot Watson (P&S) | (Note: 45 ft 0 in (13.72 m) x 12 ft 6 in (3.81 m) (12-oared) Watson-class non-self-righting (P&S) lifeboat, legacy of Mr J. Stevens of Birmingham, built by Thames Ironworks of Blackwall, London, costing £1,096.); Sold in 1926. |
| 310 | Providence | 1890 | 1912−1913 | 34-foot self-righting (P&S) | (Note: 34 ft 0 in (10.36 m) x 8 ft 0 in (2.44 m) (10-oared) self-righting (P&S) lifeboat, legacy of Mr C. Pooley of Cheltenham, built by Forrestt of Limehouse, London, costing £427 when new.); Previously at Giles Quay. Sold in 1913. |
| 429 | James Stevens No.7 | 1899 | 1913–1926 | 45-foot Watson (P&S) | (Note: 45 ft 0 in (13.72 m) x 12 ft 6 in (3.81 m) (12-oared) Watson-class non-self-righting (P&S) lifeboat, legacy of Mr J. Stevens of Birmingham, built by Thames Ironworks of Blackwall, London, costing £1,096.); Sold in 1926. |
| 491 | Reserve No. 6C | 1902 | 1926 | 35-foot self-righting (P&S) | (Note: 35 ft 0 in (10.67 m) x 8 ft 3 in (2.51 m) (10-oared) self-righting (P&S) lifeboat, legacy of Mr H. L. Beddington of London, built by Thames Ironworks of Blackwall, London, costing £838 when new.); Previously Rose Beddington at Drogheda No.2. Returned to the Relief fleet, and sold in 1927. |
| 550 | Anne Miles | 1905 | 1926–1930 | 43-foot Watson (P&S) | (Note: 43 ft 0 in (13.11 m) x 12 ft 6 in (3.81 m) (10-oared) Watson-class non-self-righting (P&S) lifeboat, gift of Miss A. Miles of West Hampstead, built by Thames Ironworks of Blackwall, London, costing £1,759 when new.); Previously at Longhope. Transferred to New Brighton. |

Pre ON numbers are unofficial numbers used by the Lifeboat Enthusiasts' Society to reference early lifeboats not included on the official RNLI list.

=== All-weather lifeboats ===
| ON | Op.No. (Note: Op. No. is the RNLI's Operational Number of the boat carried on the hull.) | Name | Built | On station | Class | Comments |
|---|---|---|---|---|---|---|
| 721 | – | Lady Klysant | 1929 | 1930–1937 | 40-foot 6in Watson | Previously at Weymouth. Transferred to Wicklow. |
| 789 | – | R. P. L. | 1936 | 1937–1962 | 46-foot Watson | |
| 963 | – | A. M. T. | 1962 | 1962–1986 | 47-foot Watson | |
| 1113 | 52-35 | City of Dublin | 1986 | 1986–2002 | Arun | |
| 1258 | 14-33 | Roy Barker III | 2001 | 2002– | Trent | |

More post-service details can be found on the respective lifeboat class pages.

=== Inshore lifeboats ===
==== D class ====
| Op.No. | Name | On station | Class | Comments |
|---|---|---|---|---|
| D-129 | Unnamed | 1967–1977 | D-class (RFD PB16) | |
| D-108 | Unnamed | 1977–1979 | D-class (RFD PB16) | |
| D-273 | Unnamed | 1980–1988 | D-class (RFD PB16) | |
| D-379 | Unnamed | 1989–1998 | D-class (EA16) | |
| D-530 | Marguerite Joan Harris | 1998–2006 | D-class (EA16) | |
| D-659 | George Godfrey Benbow | 2006–2016 | D-class (IB1) | |
| D-796 | Aideen Cresswell | 2016– | D-class (IB1) | |

== See also ==
- List of RNLI stations
- List of former RNLI stations
- Royal National Lifeboat Institution lifeboats
