= Dublin Bay Biosphere Reserve =

Biosphere reserve in Dublin Bay, Ireland, including North Bull Island

Coordinates: 53.36147°N 6.16264°W

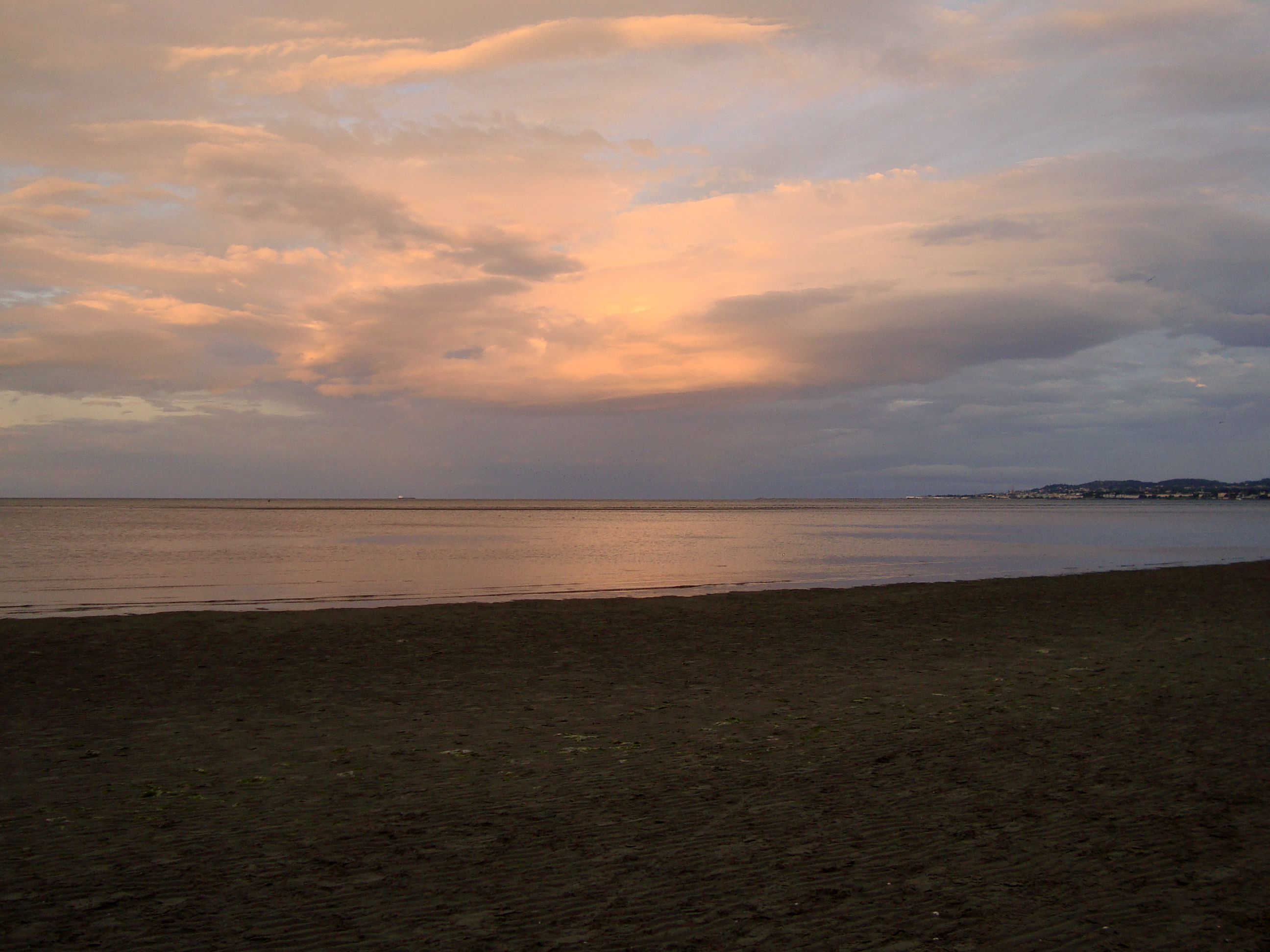
Dublin Bay

The Dublin Bay Biosphere Reserve (based on what was, pre-2015, the North Bull Island reserve) is a biosphere reserve comprising Dublin Bay, North Bull Island and adjacent land, including parts of Dublin, the capital city of Ireland, and the outfalls of multiple rivers. It contains one of the finest sand dune systems on the island of Ireland, and is internationally important in terms of its conservation value. There are high quality examples of several rare and threatened coastal habitats present within its area.

== Ecological characteristics ==
The biosphere reserve is significant from a conservation perspective since it supports well-developed salt marshes and dune systems displaying all stages of development from the earliest phase of colonization to stable and full maturity. The area is also important for nesting and wintering waterfowl.

The major habitats and land cover types are saltmarsh with glasswort (Salicornia dolichostachya and S. europaea), Puccinellia maritima and sea lavender (Limonium humile); sand dune complex with saltwort (Salsola kali), sea rocket (Cakile maritima), sea couchgrass (Agropyron junceiforme) etc.; beaches; lagoonal sand flat; lagoonal mud flats with algae such as Enteromorpha intestinalis, E. compressa and Ulva lactuca.

The biosphere reserve also holds international importance as the numbers of three species exceed the international threshold – light-bellied brent goose (Branta bernicla hrota), black-tailed godwit (Limosa limosa) and bar-tailed godwit (Limosa lapponica). Species such as grey heron (Ardea cinerea), goldeneye (Bucephala), red-breasted merganser (Mergus serrator) and greenshank (Tringa nebularia) are regular in winter in numbers of regional or local importance. The North Bull Island and parts of the buffer zone in north Dublin used to include populations of Irish mountain hare (Lepus timidus hibernicus), a uniquely Irish sub-species of a species of national and international importance, which came under severe pressure from recreational disturbance and illegal poaching.

Dublin Bay Biosphere Reserve also contains three Ramsar sites – Sandymount Strand, North Bull Island and Baldoyle Bay.

== Socio-cultural aspects ==
The beaches and amenities of the reserve serve the population of the capital of Ireland. Dublin city is the most populated area of the country, with the urban area having a population of more than a million people. Dublin Bay is the only biosphere reserve worldwide which includes within its area parts of a national capital. Therefore, its impact on society is higher than for just the immediate resident population.

In addition to its ecological value, Bull Island island has an important educational and recreation function, for school classes, day visitors and more. Two golf courses are situated on Bull Island and there are some boating activities in the adjacent waters.
