= Irishtown, Dublin =

Suburb of Dublin, Ireland

Irishtown An Baile Gaelach (Irish)
- Inner suburb
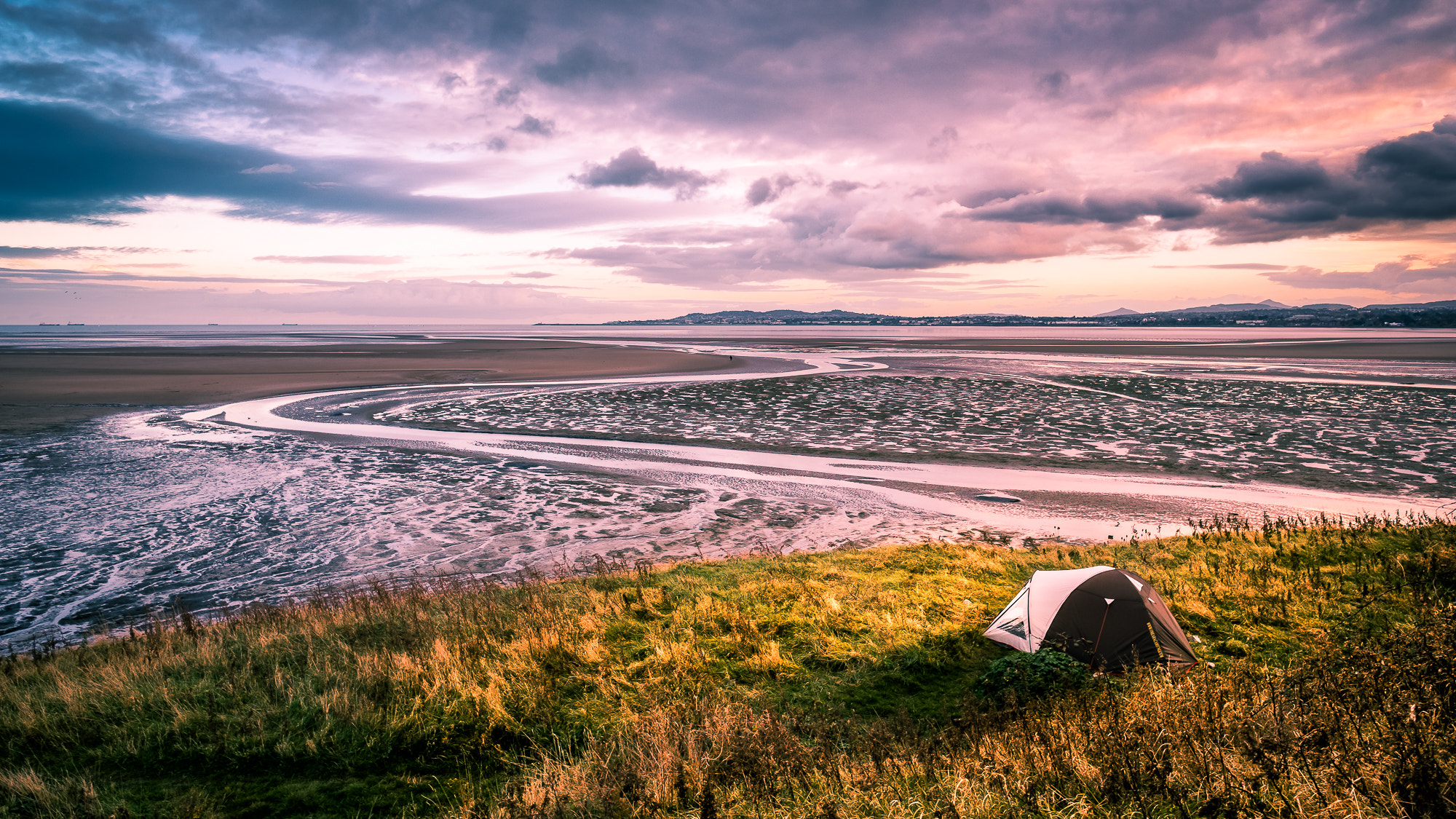
- Irishtown Nature Park

- Location in Ireland
- Coordinates: 53°20′16″N 6°13′21″W
- Country: Ireland
- Province: Leinster
- Local authority: Dublin City Council
- Time zone: UTC+0 (WET)
  - Summer (DST): UTC-1 (IST (WEST))
- Eircode routing key: D04
- Area code: 01 (+3531)
- Irish Grid Reference: O190325

Irishtown (Irish: An Baile Gaelach) is an inner suburb of Dublin, Ireland. It is situated on the southside of the River Liffey, between Ringsend to the north and Sandymount to the south, and is to the east of the River Dodder.

== Location ==
Irishtown and Ringsend are often conflated into one area. Irishtown includes Bath Street, Strand Street and Pembroke Street, Stella Gardens, one half of Pigeon House Road, part of Bath Avenue and Londonbridge Road.

== History ==
Irishtown grew outside of Dublin, about 2 km east of the medieval city walls (see also Ringsend). Dublin was originally a Viking city and after 1171, when an Anglo-Norman army seized it, Dublin became the centre of English rule in Ireland. The native Gaelic Irish were therefore viewed as an alien force in the city, and suspicion of them was deepened by continual raids on Dublin and its environs by the O'Byrne and O'Toole clans from the nearby Wicklow Mountains. By the 15th century, Gaelic migration to the city had made the English authorities fearful that the English language and culture would become a minority there. As a result, the Irish inhabitants of Dublin were expelled from the city proper in about 1454, in line with the Statutes of Kilkenny. The Irish population were only allowed to trade inside the city limits by daylight. At the end of the day's trading, they would leave and set up camp in what was to become known as "the Irishtown" which was considered more of a "ghetto".

In 1703, St Matthew's Church was built for Protestant seamen. Wolfe Tone rented a house in Irishtown in 1790, where he was regularly visited by Thomas Russell. In 1794 Richard Power, judge of the Court of Exchequer, who was facing charges of corruption, drowned himself in the river at Irishtown.

At the end of the 19th century and into the early 20th century, Irishtown was the location of the Waxies' Dargle, an annual outing by Dublin cobblers ("waxies"), which a well-known folk song recalls.

Irishtown formed part of the Pembroke Township created in 1863. Pembroke was redesignated an urban district in 1899, before being abolished and brought into the jurisdiction of the city in 1930.

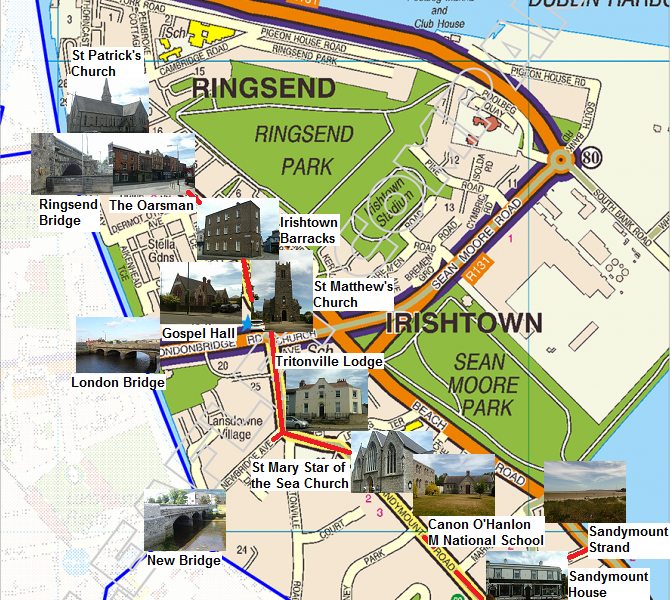
Map of Irishtown (with Ringsend & Sandymount) with notable buildings.

== Irishtown Nature Park ==
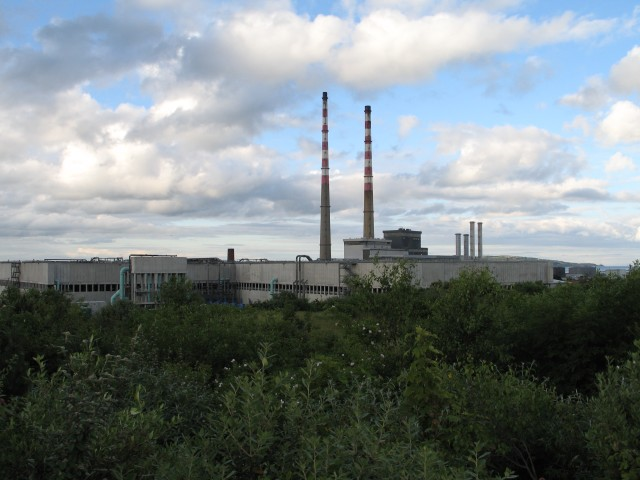
Poolbeg Power Station from Irishtown nature park

Irishtown Nature Park is a small park with a walkway which offers several kilometres of walking trails along the Poolbeg Peninsula.

== See also ==
- History of Dublin
- List of towns and villages in Ireland
