= Baldoyle Bay =

Sea inlet and nature reserve north of Dublin, Ireland

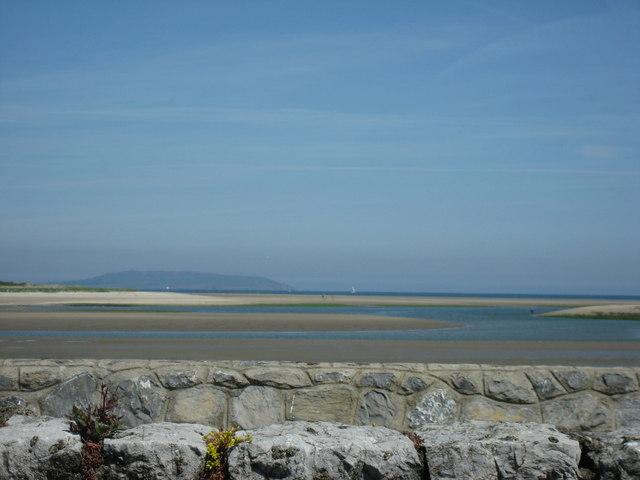
- View from Strand Road

- Location within Ireland
- Location: Fingal, County Dublin, Ireland
- Nearest city: Dublin (suburbs of Portmarnock and Baldoyle)
- Coordinates: 53.401°N 6.1245°W
- Established: 1988

Ramsar Wetland
- Designated: 25 October 1988
- Reference no.: 413

Baldoyle Bay is a sea inlet on the east coast of Fingal in Ireland, in the traditional County Dublin. It is situated between Portmarnock, at its head, and Baldoyle. It contains two small estuaries, those of the Sluice River and the Mayne River, and is sometimes called Baldoyle Estuary. The inlet is an important natural feature with protected status. It was once the site of a Viking longphort and later the fishing village of Baldoyle developed near its outlet to the sea.

== Location and access ==
The narrow inlet runs north–south, reaching the sea north of Howth Head, along the Burrow Beach. At its head is Portmarnock Bridge, where a road from old Portmarnock meets the road from the modern Portmarnock village centre, while near its outlet is the former fishing village of Baldoyle, now a residential suburb of Dublin. It is bounded on the seaward side by the peninsula on which the Velvet Strand (used as a runway for early flights) and the Portmarnock Golf Club course are situated.

The estuary is paralleled by a coastal road to the west and north, served by bus, and with few possibilities for parking. To the east, access is possible on foot from parking for Portmarnock's southern beaches. A small green space exists at the northern end of the estuary. This is popular with birds and holds an interpretative sign with information on the area. There is also a walking route to the estuary from the Clongriffin area, across the former Baldoyle Racecourse.

== Nature ==
The inlet contains the estuaries of two small rivers, the Sluice at the northern, Portmarnock, end, and the Mayne, mid-way south, at the north end of Baldoyle. Each river is formed from several tributaries in mid-Fingal, and both cause flooding fairly regularly at certain points on their courses.

The inlet contains both freshwater and saltwater marshes, as well as raised salt marsh, mud and sand, and riverine shallows and mud channels, and is protected by sand dunes. Four habitat types feature in Annex I of the EU Habitats Directive, namely Salicornia mud, Mediterranean salt meadows, Atlantic salt meadows and tidal mudflats. Much of the intertidal flats are exposed at low tide, mostly sand but also some muds in the inner estuary.

Notable flora include common cord-grass, narrow-leafed eelgrass, dwarf eelgrass, and, in summer, green algae. In the salt marsh area, sea rush, sea purslane, sea plantain and glasswort are found.

Baldoyle Bay is an important coastal site, used by wintering wildfowl, including Brent geese, and waders and other birds. Regularly sighted species included mallard duck, shelduck, great crested grebe, pintail, golden plover, redshank, bartailed godwit and the common scoter. Tubeworms and mud shrimps can be found in the bay.

== Designations ==
The bay is a Special Protection Area, cared for by the local authority and the National Parks and Wildlife Service. Declared a Statutory Nature Reserve in 1988 the inner, estuarine, parts of the bay are protected as a Special Area of Conservation (SAC) while, under the Ramsar Convention, the wetlands have been designated as of international importance. They support several habitats that are listed in the EU Habitats Directive. It is part of the Dublin Bay Biosphere Reserve.

== History ==
The Baldoyle area was raided and later settled by the "dark-haired foreigners" (Danish Vikings), who found the bay convenient for their long-boats, with their shallow draft - the Mayne River and related streams provided fresh water. Their settlement was near what later became Baldoyle village, while Portmarnock formed on the Sluice River near the bay.

In more recent times, north of Baldoyle village, was Baldoyle Racecourse, for a period Dublin's main racecourse, and later one of two, then three, major horse-racing venues serving the city. Established around 1853, it closed in 1973.
