= Dublin Waste-to-Energy Facility =

Power station fuelled by waste in Dublin, Ireland

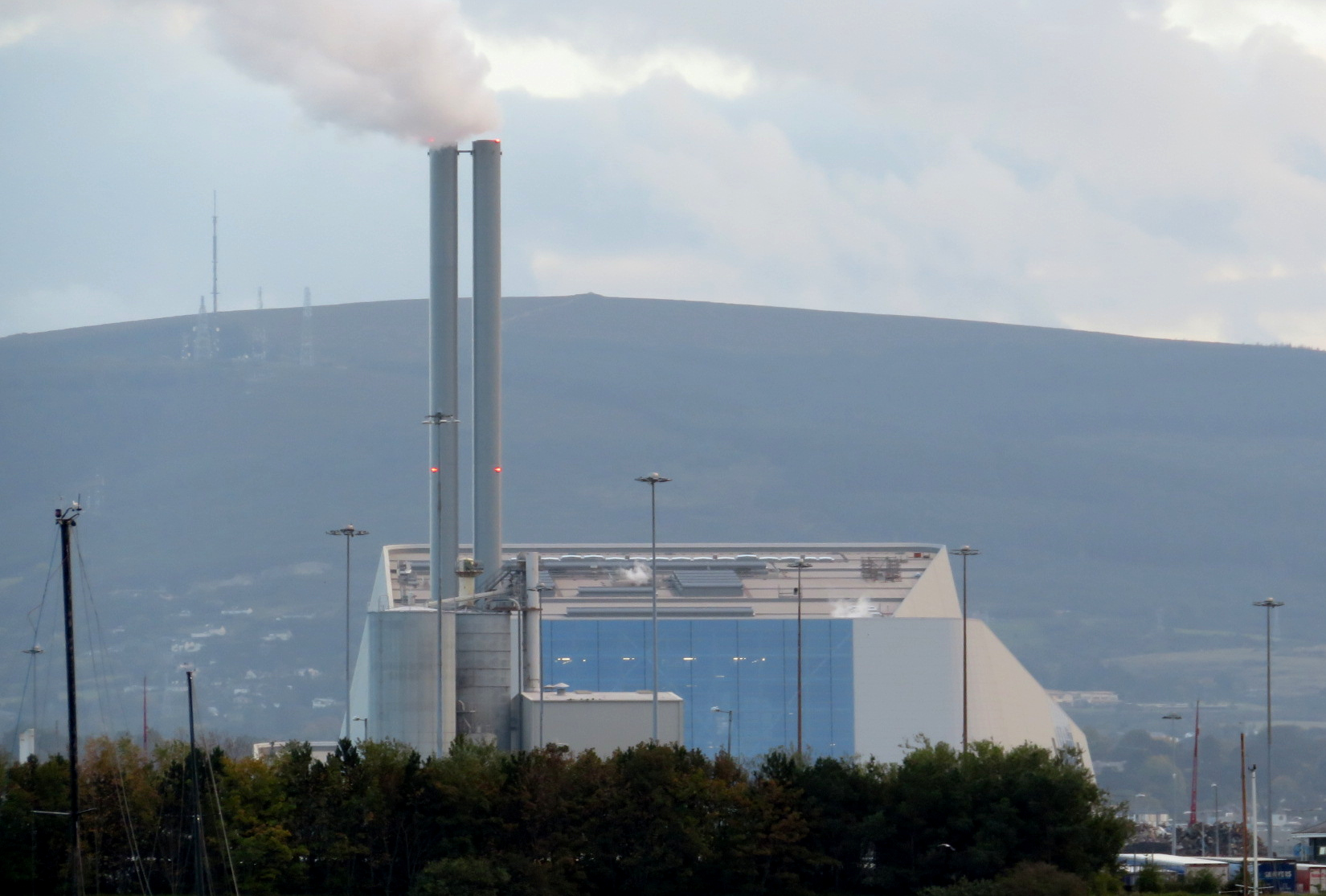
- The Dublin Waste-to-Energy Facility
- Country: Ireland
- Location: Poolbeg, Dublin
- Coordinates: 53.3419°N 6.2008°W
- Status: Operational
- Construction began: 2014 (11 years ago)
- Commission date: 2017 (8 years ago)
- Construction cost: €600m
- Owner: Covanta Energy
- Operator: Reworld

Thermal power station
- Primary fuel: Municipal solid waste (MSW)
- Chimneys: 2
- Cogeneration?: Yes

Power generation
- Nameplate capacity: 60 MW

External links
- Website: Official Website

The Dublin Waste-to-Energy Facility, also known as the Poolbeg Incinerator, is a waste-to-energy plant serving the Greater Dublin Area in Ireland, located on the Poolbeg peninsula. The plant is capable of producing up to 60 megawatts of electricity, enough to power 80,000 homes, and provide district heating for up to 50,000 homes in the Dublin area. The facility will process up to 600,000 tonnes of waste per year. Poolbeg accepted its first delivery of waste on the 24th of April 2017.

The proposal to build an incinerator at this location provoked controversy since its inception in 1997 with concerns about traffic and emissions, but construction work finally started in 2014.

== Incidents ==
On 8 June 2017, eleven people were admitted to hospital after an ‘uncontrolled release’ of lime inside the flue gas treatment area inside the plant. Covanta, the operator of the plant, was ordered to temporarily cease the incineration process at the facility by the Health and Safety Authority.
