= Sandymount Strand =

Beach in Dublin, Ireland

Coordinates: 53°19′25″N 6°12′21″W

Designations

Ramsar Wetland
- Official name: Sandymount Strand/Tolka Estuary
- Designated: 7 June 1996
- Reference no.: 832

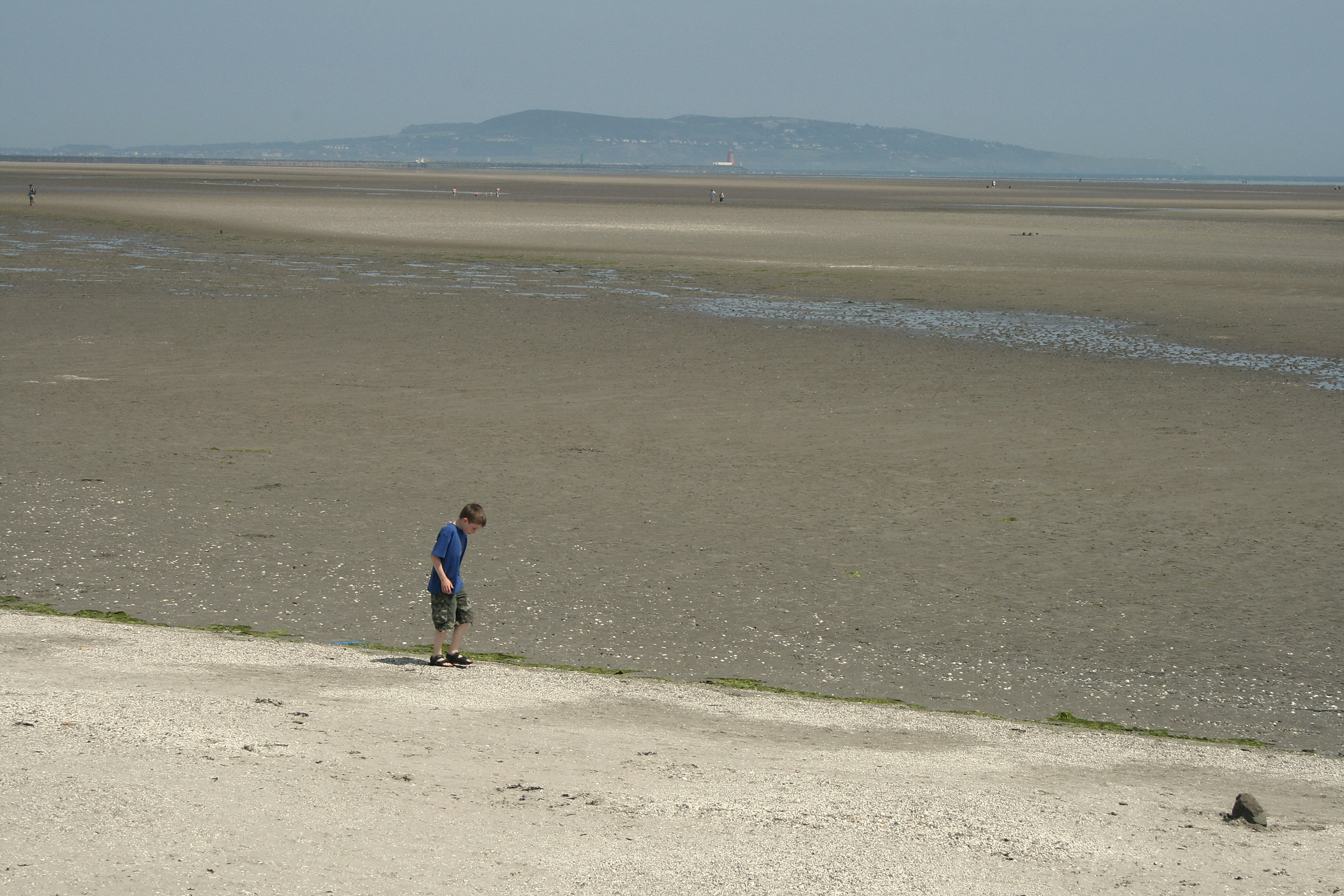
Sandymount Strand looking across Dublin Bay to Howth Head

Sandymount Strand (Irish: Dumhach Thrá) is a large strand on the east coast of Ireland, adjacent to the village and suburb of Sandymount in Dublin. It is part of South Bull - a major component of the south side of Dublin Bay, and part of the Dublin Bay Biosphere Reserve. South Bull is a mirror to the North Bull sandbank, which grew into North Bull Island.

Sandymount Strand is a popular place for locals to take a walk. People, and in the past - there is no longer public vehicular access - cars, have been occasionally trapped by the incoming tide. A large inlet of water that remains even at low tide is known locally as "Cockle Lake".

== History ==
In the 1930s, the strand was included as a suggested location for the construction of a new Dublin airport.

== The baths ==
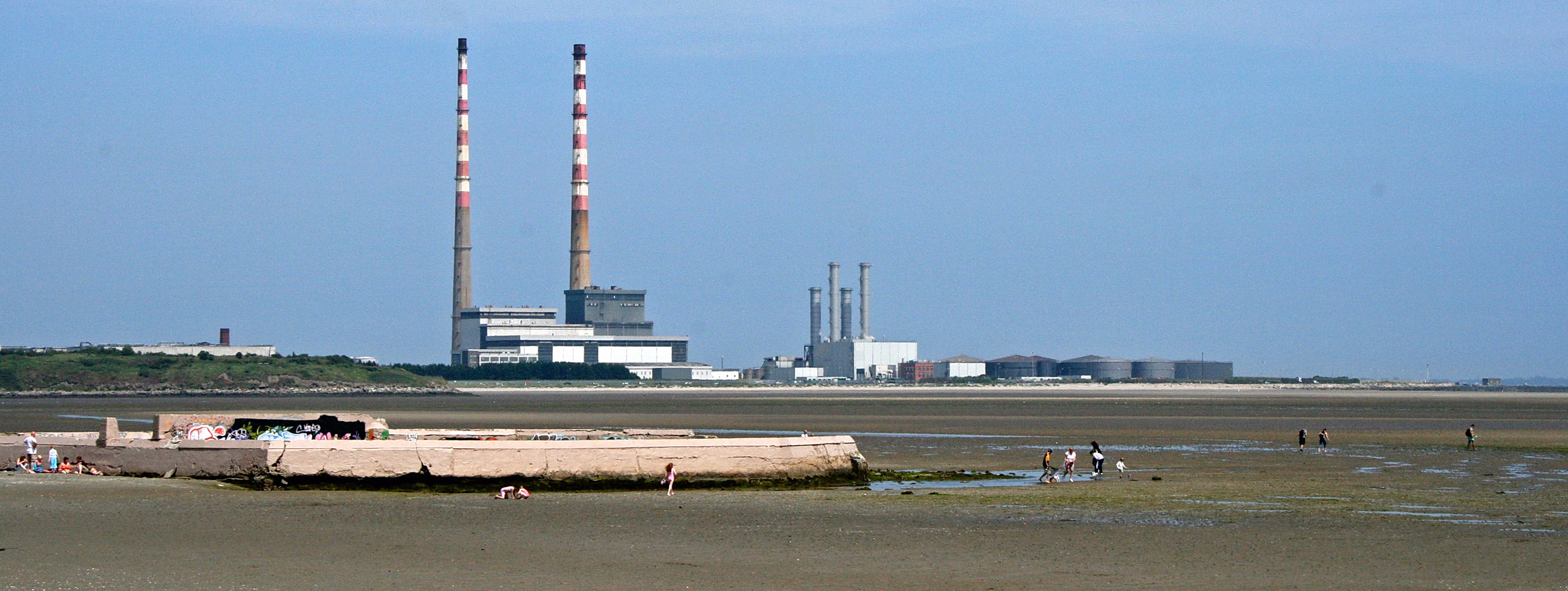
Sandymount swimming baths; in the background: the Poolbeg Generating Station

The Merrion Promenade Pier and Baths Co built Sandymount swimming baths in 1883. The baths measured approximately 40 by 40 metres, with a 75-metre pier added in 1884. The pier featured a bandstand halfway along it and summer concerts were regularly held there for many years. By 1920, the pier had deteriorated so much that it had to be demolished. The concrete baths section, which resembles a small harbour, remains.

== Martello Tower ==
About halfway along the strand is a Martello tower. Built in 1804, it is one of many such circular defensive watchtowers along the coastlines of the British Isles, as part of a system of defences to provide advance warning of a feared invasion by Napoleon. The Tower was used by the Dublin United Tramways Company as an office, and was also a popular cafe back in the 1960s. An attempt to turn the tower into a restaurant led to the installation of a large window with roller blinds on the seaward side of the tower. The restaurant never opened, leaving the tower with the modified window.

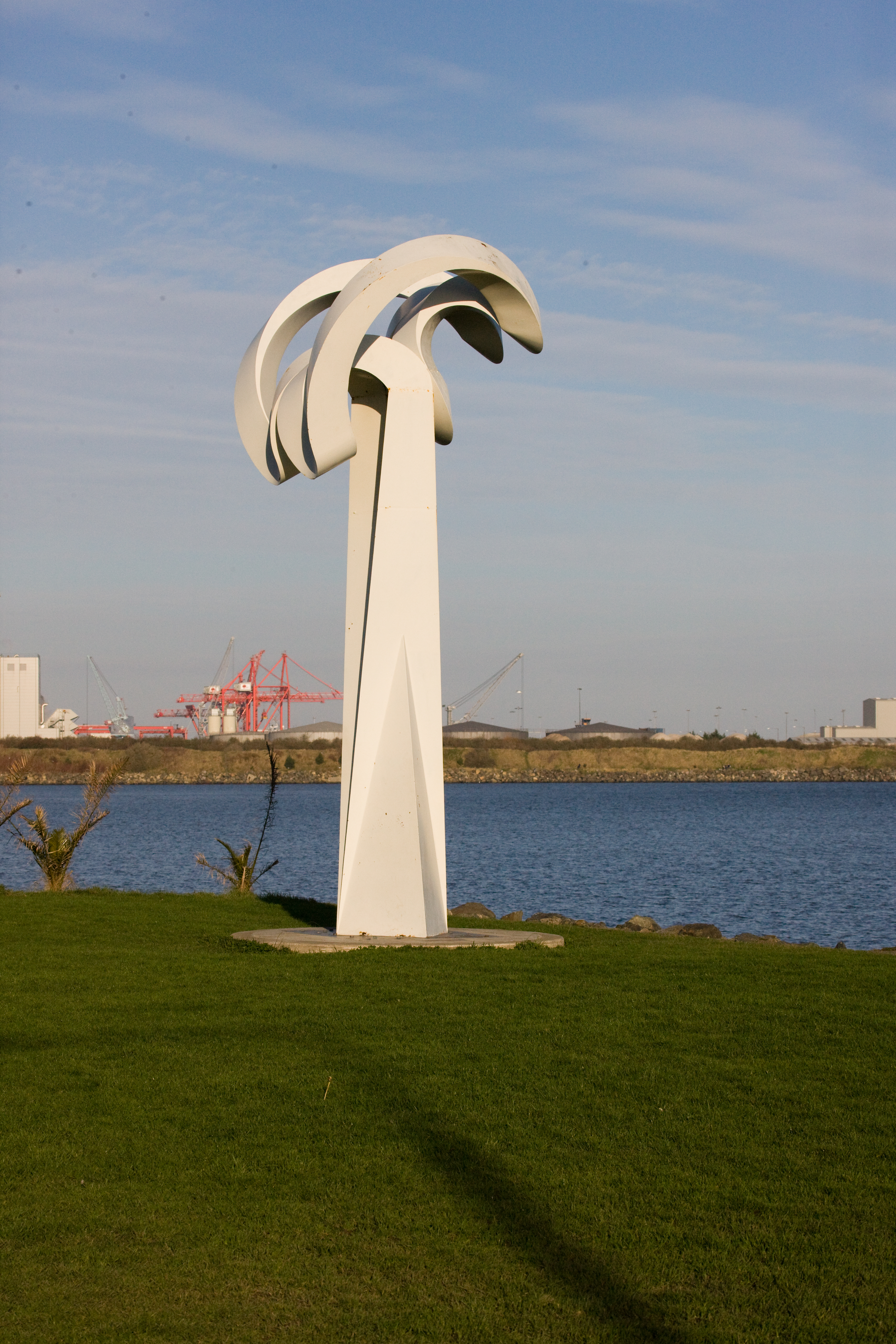
An Cailín Bán / Awaiting the Mariner sculpture on Sandymount Strand.

== Awaiting the Mariner (An Cailín Bán) ==
At the end of the strand walkway lies a 20-foot high metal sculpture donated by Mexican President Vicente Fox in November 2002, symbolizing the friendship between the Irish and Mexican people. This work, named Awaiting the Mariner, was created by Mexican sculptor Sebastián and was the first permanent work by a Mexican artist in Dublin. There was a mixed reaction from residents when the sculpture was originally placed.

== Gallan Gréine ==
The Gallan Gréine marker stone is located at the end of the strand beside the Irishtown playing fields. Carved by Cliodna Cussen and dedicated to James Joyce in 1983, a sighting stone stands 300 metres to the west and when aligned with the marker stone to the east, indicates the winter solstice with the sun rising over Killiney Hill around 21 December each year. The face of this stone is also a sundial.

== In fiction ==
"Am I walking into eternity along Sandymount strand?"

– James Joyce, Episode 3 of Ulysses

James Joyce based two episodes of his 1922 novel Ulysses along Sandymount Strand. In the third episode, "Proteus", Stephen Dedalus wanders the strand, while later the same day, in the "Nausicaa" episode, Leopold Bloom sits on a rock and masturbates as he watches a young woman sunbathing.
