= Poolbeg =

Man-made peninsula in Dublin, Ireland

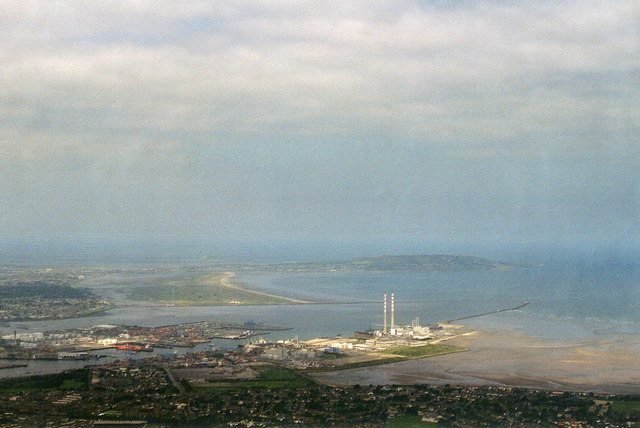
Aerial view of Poolbeg

Poolbeg (Irish: An Poll Beag) is an artificial peninsula extending from Ringsend, Dublin, into Dublin Bay.

== History ==
The Poolbeg peninsula was built between the mid-18th century and the present day, starting with the Ballast Office Wall, the first section of the Great South Wall to be built on what was then a sandbar known as the South Bull. As the various sections of the Great South Wall were built, further sandbars formed where the River Liffey left its silt, and these were gradually filled with rubble and built upon.

The name "Poole Begge" originally referred to a tidal pool located out in Dublin Harbour and surrounded by sandbars. This was where the Poolbeg Lighthouse was built in 1767. The lighthouse was connected to land by the Great South Wall, which was completed in 1795.

== Overview ==
The Poolbeg "peninsula" is home to a number of landmarks, including the Great South Wall, the Poolbeg Lighthouse, the Irishtown Nature Park, the southern part of Dublin Port, an energy-from-waste facility, and a power station, formerly Dublin's main power station, which includes the two landmark chimneys, Dublin’s tallest structures.

=== Poolbeg Chimneys ===
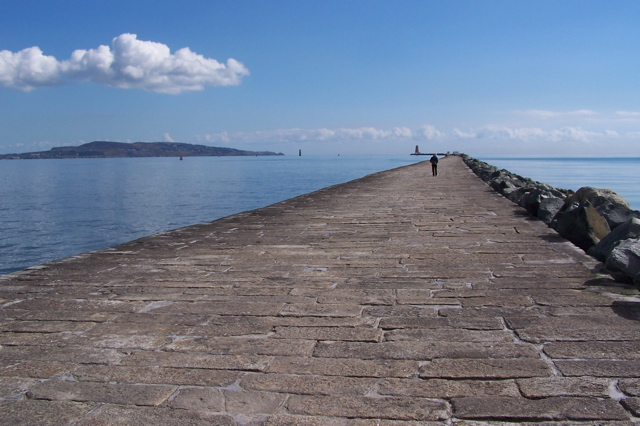
Great South Wall

The thermal station chimneys at Poolbeg Generating Station are among the tallest structures in Ireland and are visible from most of Dublin city. Number 1 chimney is 207.48 m (680 ft 9 in) high, while Number 2 chimney is 207.8 m (681 ft 9in) high. The chimneys are featured prominently in the music video for the song "Pride (In The Name Of Love)" by U2. Dublin City Councillor and historian Dermot Lacey began a process to list the chimneys for preservation to safeguard their future after the Station was to close in 2010. This was later refused by the Council Planning Department.

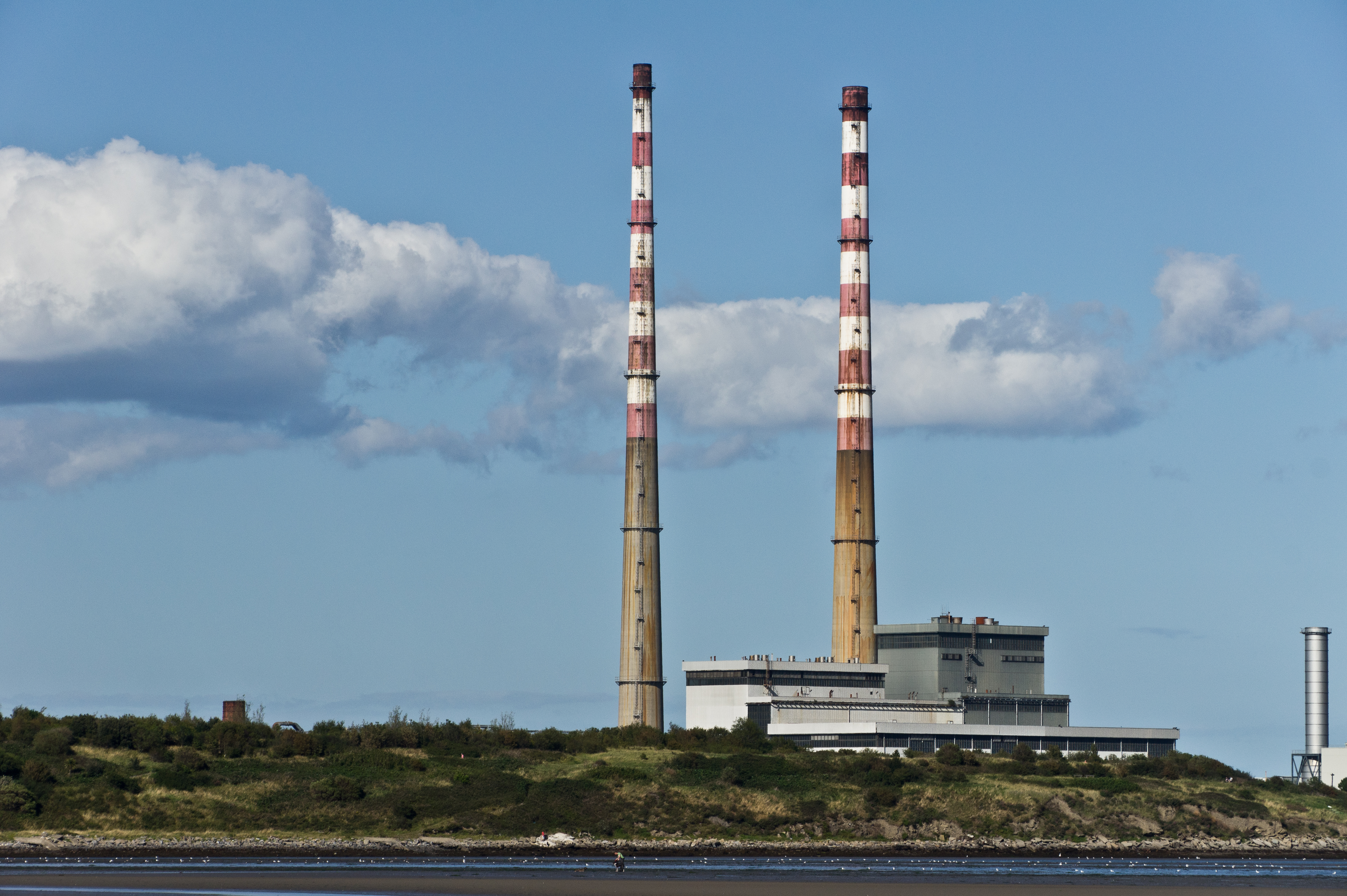
View of Poolbeg Chimneys From Sandymount Strand

They were subsequently listed as protected structures in July 2014.

== 21st century plans ==
=== New residential area and bridge ===
The Poolbeg West development consists of 34 hectares of land which has been designated for fast-track planning permission for the construction of nine-storey apartment blocks and up to 100,000 square metres of commercial and retail space, including 3,000 homes and commercial space for 8,000 workers.

In June 2016, Dublin City Council announced that it would fast-track the construction of a €30 million bridge linking Dublin's south Docklands with the planned new "urban quarter" on the Poolbeg peninsula. However, construction had not begun as of 2024.
