= Poolbeg Generating Station =

Power generating station in Dublin, Ireland

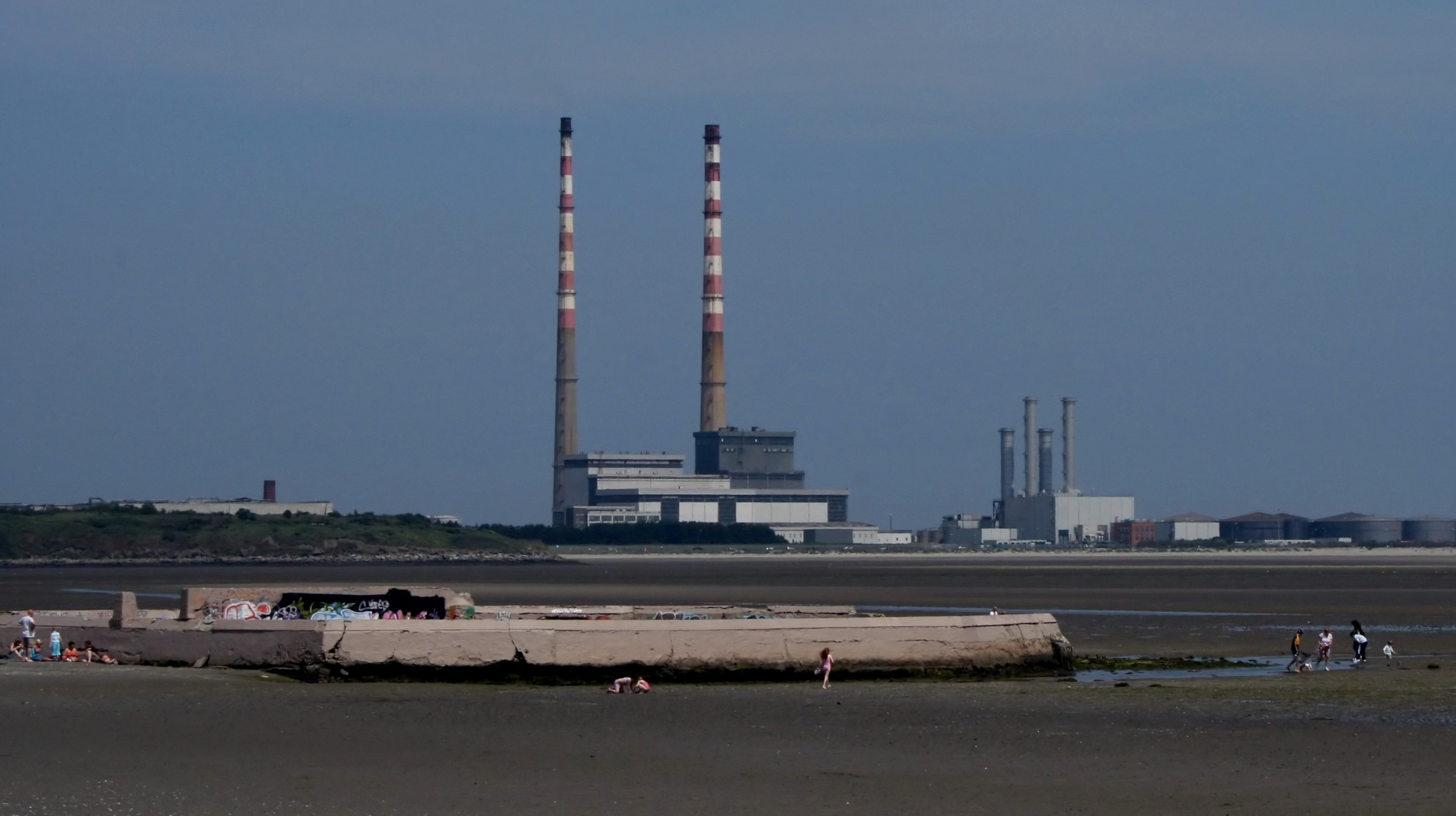
- Poolbeg Power Station in Dublin, Ireland
- Official name: Cumhachtstáisiún an Phoill Bhig (Irish)
- Country: Ireland
- Location: Dublin
- Coordinates: 53.339605°N 6.189821°W
- Status: Partially decommissioned
- Construction began: 1965
- Decommission date: 2010
- Construction cost: IR£60 million
- Operator: Electricity Supply Board (ESB)
- Combined cycle?: Yes

External links
- Commons: Related media on Commons

Poolbeg Generating Station (Irish: Cumhachtstáisiún an Phoill Bhig), colloquially known as the Poolbeg Stacks, is a power station owned and operated by the Electricity Supply Board of Ireland (ESB). There are two stations on the site, the older thermal station containing units 1, 2, and 3 and the combined cycle gas station containing units CG14, CG15 and ST16, which is located toward the eastern end of the site. The six units have a total installed capacity of 1020 MW.

The plant is located on the Poolbeg peninsula, an artificial peninsula built of reclaimed land to the east of Ringsend, Dublin, on the south bank of Dublin Port. Its two chimneys, at just over 207 metres, are visible over much of Dublin, making them well-known landmarks and some of the tallest structures in Ireland.

== History ==
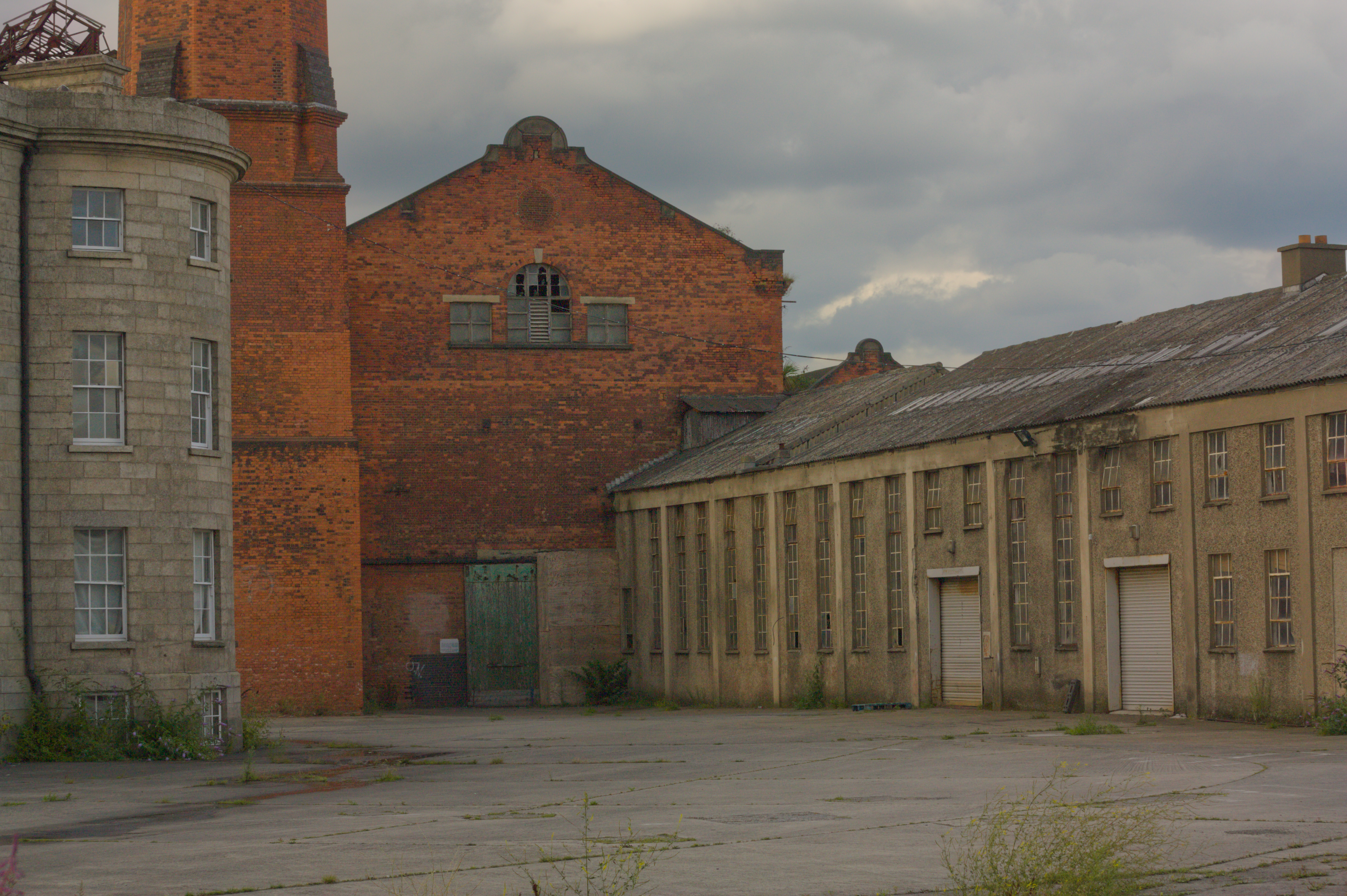
Old Pigeon House Hotel and Generating Station

Poolbeg Thermal Station (from the west side) in 2006

The Poolbeg power station is situated adjacent to the now-decommissioned Pigeon House generating station, where electricity was first generated in 1903 (with the distinction of being the first in the world to generate three phase power).

The name “Pigeon House” comes from a caretaker’s lodge built there in 1760. At the time the site was a wooden platform known pragmatically as “The Piles”, at the seaward end of the Ballast Office Wall embankment. The lodge was intended to provide rest and storage facilities for workers as they built the Great South Wall, a massive sea wall project that began in 1761 and would take three decades to complete.

The first caretaker, John Pidgeon, was appointed in 1761. Pidgeon opened an eatery to provide refreshments for the workers and the growing number of travelers arriving into Dublin Bay. “Pigeon’s House” as it was known became one of the most popular restaurants in Dublin.

Around 1793, as the Great South Wall was nearing completion, a hotel opened at the site, the Pigeon House Hotel.

The hotel did not last long for after the 1798 Rebellion, the area was transformed into a military fort, the Pigeon House Fort. The hotel building was converted into the officers’ accommodation within the fort, which then grew over the next hundred years to include an armory, a hospital, and trenches crossed by drawbridges.

Between 1878 and 1881, a sewage pipe was installed along the former Ballast Office Wall (now the landward half of the Great South Wall). In 1897, the military complex was sold to the Dublin Corporation and developed into a sewage processing facility, as well as the city’s first major electrical power generating station. It was used for power generation until it was decommissioned in 1976, and the Poolbeg plant is still known locally as the Pigeon House.

The modern Poolbeg station was named after the Poolbeg lighthouse which formed the outer end of the Great South Wall. The lighthouse, completed in 1767 when construction of the Great South Wall was just beginning, stood originally at the edge of a natural tidal pool at the entrance to Dublin Harbor known as “Poole Begge”, which was surrounded at low tide with sand bars.

The Poolbeg power station was constructed in two separate phases, beginning in the 1960s. The ESB decided to construct the station in 1965 and the initial development was completed in 1971 with the construction of Units 1 and 2 at a cost of 20 million Irish pounds. The original Pigeon House generators remained on standby duty until 1976. Unit 3 was completed in 1978 at a cost of 40 million pounds.

The combined cycle station was constructed in the 1990s. CG14 was commissioned in 1994, CG15 in 1998 and ST16 in 2001.

== Technical details ==
The identical units 1 and 2 have a design output of 120 MW each. They both have turbo-alternators manufactured by Brown Boveri and 'drum type' boilers by Fives Penhoet, France.

Unit 3 has a design output of 271 MW. It uses a turbo-alternator manufactured by Alstom, France and a 'once through' type Boiler by M.A.N Germany.

Uniquely among power stations run by the Electricity Supply Board, all three units in the thermal plant can currently fire on oil or gas. Gas is supplied to the site by the Bord Gáis network. Oil is stored in five tank in the site's oil farm, with a maximum capacity of 140,000 tonnes.

The CCGT plant has two Siemens V94.2A gas turbines (units CG14 and CG15), a HRSG and a steam turbine (ST16).

Since it opened in 2017, the adjacent Dublin Waste-to-Energy facility has supplied the power plant with steam.

=== Closure ===
In 2006, the ESB advised of its intention to withdraw approximately 1,300 MW of total Irish electricity capacity over the next five years, this effectively reduced the installed capacity of fully dispatchable electricity generation in the country from 6,437 MW to 5,150 MW by the end of 2010. This 1300 MW closure, was aimed at the older inefficient power stations in Ireland, the 60% average generation availability between 2002 and 2005 that was produced by the 3 thermal units, units which amount to 461 MW of combined electricity capacity at Poolbeg Generating Station Dublin were to close, while the newer 460 MW combined cycle of fossil gas turbine at Poolbeg would remain operational.

== Poolbeg chimneys ==
The thermal station chimneys completed in 1971 are among the tallest structures in Ireland and are visible from most of Dublin city. Number 1 chimney is 207.48m (680 ft 9in) high. Number 2 chimney is 207.8m (681 ft 9in) high. The chimneys are featured prominently in the video for the song "Pride (In The Name Of Love)" by U2. Dublin City Councillor and historian Dermot Lacey began a process to list the chimneys for preservation to safeguard their future after the Station was to close in 2010. After significant public outcry, this was later refused by the council's planning department.

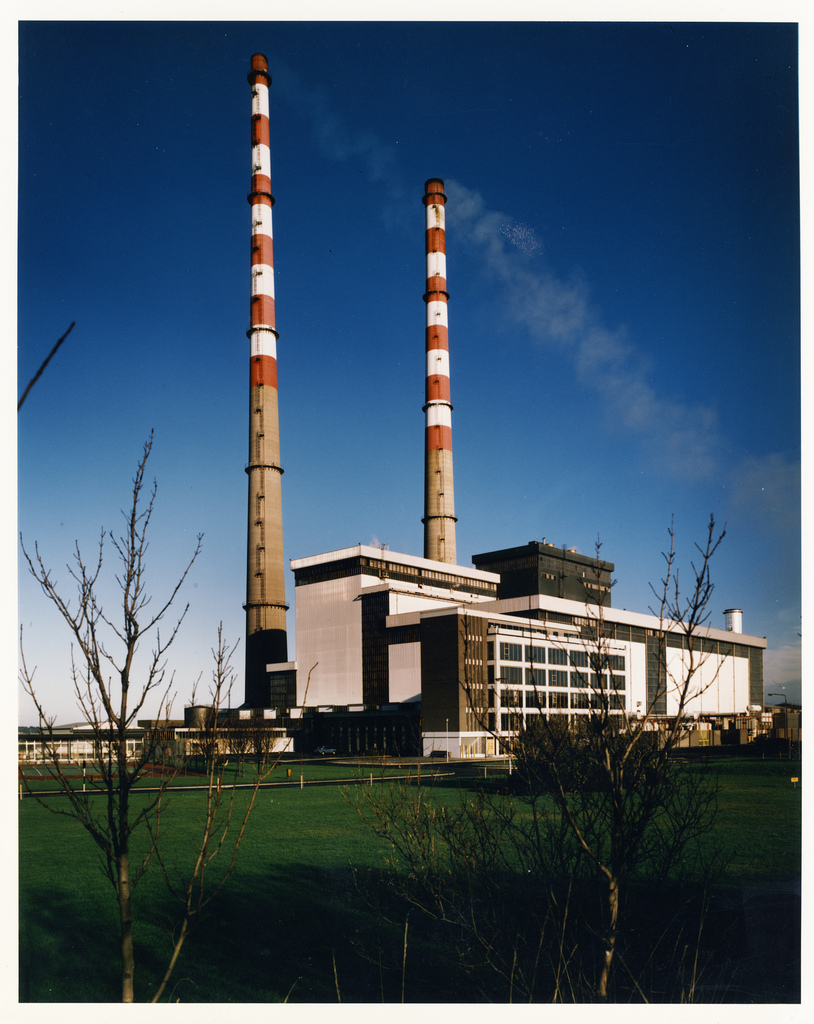
In operation, 1994.

They were listed as protected structures in July 2014.
