= North Bank Lighthouse =

Irish lighthouse

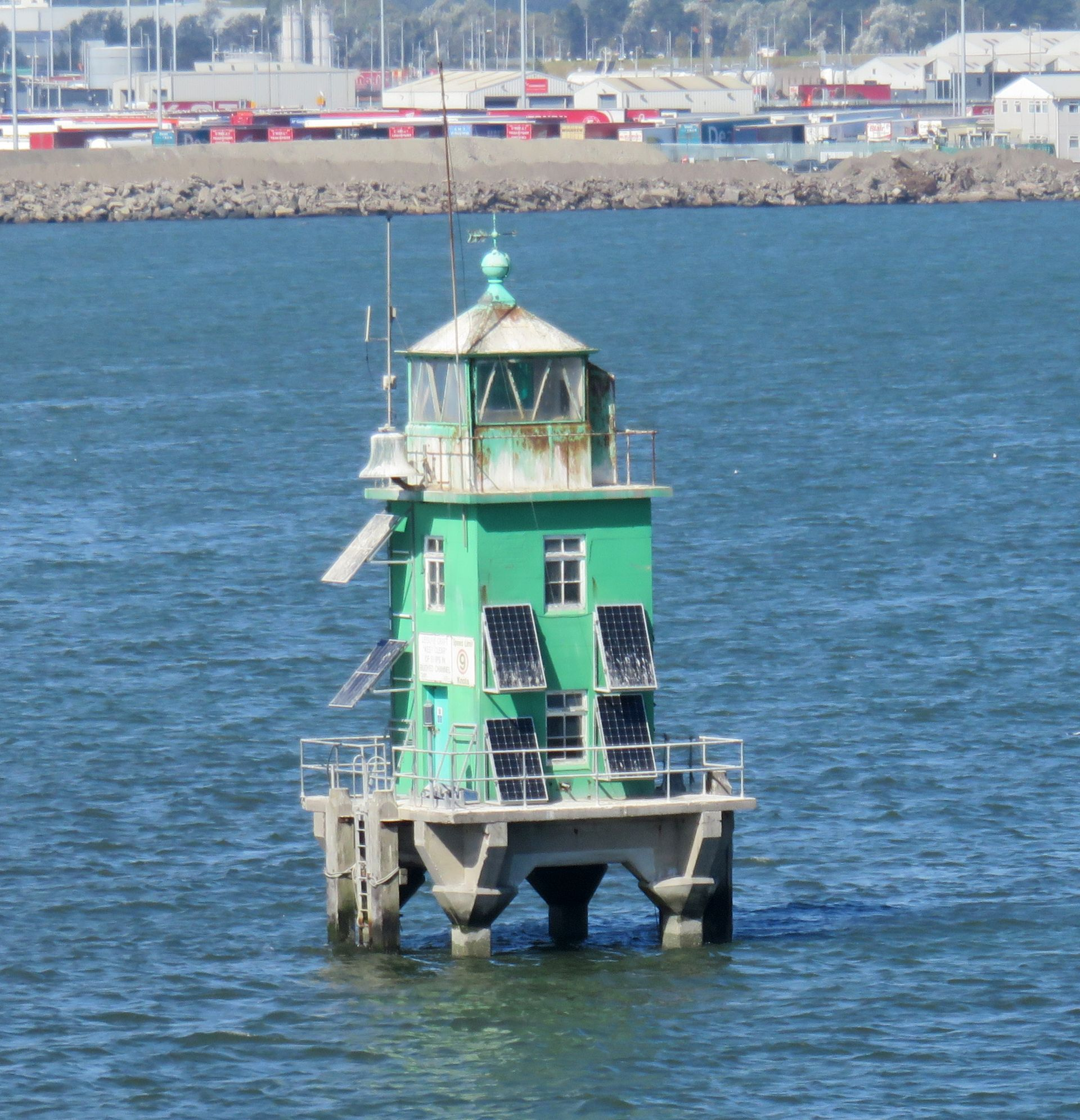
- North Bank Lighthouse in 2025
- Location: River Liffey, Dublin, Ireland
- Coordinates: 53.344858°N 6.176455°W

Tower
- Constructed: 1882
- Height: 11 metres (36 ft)
- Markings: Green tower

Light
- First lit: 1882
- Focal height: 10 metres (33 ft)
- Range: 16 nautical miles (30 km; 18 mi)
- Characteristic: Oc.G.

The North Bank or Northbank Lighthouse, is an active aid to navigation located at the mouth of the River Liffey, near Dublin, Ireland. It is one of four lighthouses that help guide shipping into the Liffey, and the Port of Dublin, all of which are operated and maintained by the Dublin Port Company. Built in 1882, it also affectionately called The Tea Caddy due to its architecture, and has also been described as "resembling a giant mailbox on stilts".

== History ==
Completed in 1882, the green lighthouse consists of a square tower with a lantern room and gallery, which is supported by a series of concrete columns. This gives an overall height of 11 metres (36 ft). It is located midway between the end of the North Bull Wall, and Alexandra Quay and the main port.

The other lighthouses for the port are Poolbeg at the end of the Great South Wall, North Bull at the end of the North Bull Wall, and North Wall Quay Lighthouse at the entrance to the Alexandra Basin. These lights and the various buoys at the side of the channel follow the convention of green on the right (starboard) and red on the left (port) when entering the dredged channel. The 1923 edition of the British Pilot shows that this has not always been the case, with a partial reversal of colours. Then Poolbeg light was painted black, North Bull had a red tower and North Bank showed an occulting white light from a "tower, painted with red and white bands".

Although the fog bell at North Bank is now disused, in 1923 it was still operational, along with other bells at North Bull and North Wall Quay, whereas Poolbeg had a fog siren.

== Popular culture ==
A large scale replica of the lighthouse complete with a working green light was built by artist Fergal McCarthy inside the Science Gallery at Trinity College, Dublin in 2015. It was part of the Home/Sick exhibition, McCarthy having been "fascinated for several years by the sight of the Northbank Lighthouse at the mouth of the Liffey estuary".

In 2017, the lighthouse was used as a diving platform by cliff divers who put on a display as a part of the lead up to the Red Bull Cliff Diving World Series competition that took place on Inishmore in June of that year.

== Operations ==
Operated by the Dublin Port Company, it is registered under the international Admiralty number A5886 and it has the NGA identifier of 114–6632. With a focal height of 10 metres (33 ft) above sea level, the light can be seen for 16 nautical miles. Its characteristic is an occulting green light, which is lit for seven seconds and eclipsed (or dark) for one second.

== See also ==
- List of lighthouses in Ireland
