= North Bull Lighthouse =

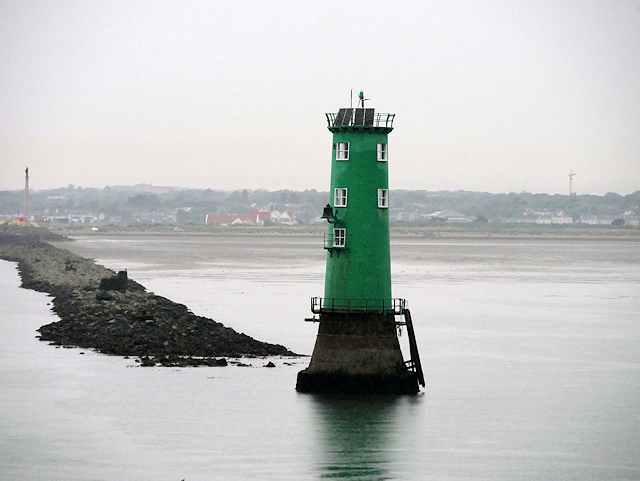
- Location: River Liffey, Dublin, Ireland
- Coordinates: 53.34488°N 6.14972°W

Tower
- Constructed: 1880
- Construction: Wrought iron
- Height: 15 metres (49 ft)
- Markings: Green tower

Light
- First lit: 1880
- Focal height: 15 metres (50 ft)
- Range: 10 nautical miles (19 km; 12 mi)
- Characteristic: Fl.G.

The North Bull Lighthouse, is an active aid to navigation located at the mouth of the River Liffey, near Dublin, Ireland. It is one of four lighthouses that help guide shipping into the Liffey, and the Port of Dublin, all of which are operated and maintained by the Dublin Port Company.

Completed in 1880, it was designed by Bindon Blood Stoney an Irish engineer, who also oversaw the construction of the North Bull Wall. The green lighthouse marks the outer end of the wall, which becomes submerged at high tide. On the opposite side of the channel, at the end of the Great South Wall is the red Poolbeg Lighthouse.

== History ==
The need for the lighthouse and other improvements to aids to navigation at the port, was described in the proceedings of the Institution of Mechanical Engineers in 1888, following a visit to Dublin by members of the Institute. "The construction of deep-water quays and the improvement of the channel were followed by an increase in the number of passenger steamers entering and leaving the port at fixed hours; and, as this class of traffic developed the need of improved lights and fog-signals was felt." The proceedings also show an early photograph with the four storey tower having a small lantern room at the top of tower, this was later removed, and the light is now being shown from a pole in the same location.

North Bull was designed by Bindon Blood Stoney who was the Chief Engineer of the Dublin Port and Docks Board, and first became operational in 1880, it originally displayed a white occulting light from a fourth-order Barbier and Fenestre optic. Although the light was fixed, a set of four rotating screens with lenses produced the occulting characteristic of seven seconds lit and eclipsed (or dark) for four seconds.

During foggy conditions a fog bell was used, whereby a mechanism struck a 17 long cwt (860 kg) bell "four times in quick succession every thirty seconds". Although the fog bell at North Bull is now disused, in 1923 it was still operational, along with other bells at North Bank and North Wall Quay, whereas Poolbeg had a fog siren.

The 15-metre-high (49 ft) wrought iron tower sits on a stonework platform which itself is built upon foundations of "two concrete blocks, each weighing 330 tons". The blocks were cast at Alexandra Basin and moved using a floating sheerleg crane.

== Operations ==
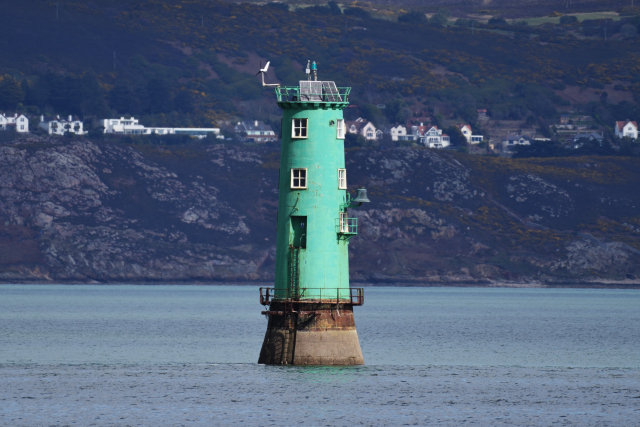
North Bull Lighthouse in 2018

Operated by the Dublin Port Company, it is registered under the international Admiralty number A5884 and it has the NGA identifier of 114–6628. With a focal height of 15 metres (50 ft) above sea level, the light can be seen for 10 nautical miles. Its characteristic is a green light, which flashes once every four seconds.

Other lighthouses that guide shipping into the port are Poolbeg at the end of the Great South Wall, the North Bank Lighthouse located midway between the end of the North Bull Wall and Alexandra Quay, and the North Wall Quay Lighthouse at the entrance to the Alexandra Basin. These lights and the various buoys at the side of the channel follow the convention of green on the right (starboard) and red on the left (port) when entering the dredged channel. The 1923 edition of the British Pilot shows that this has not always been the case, with a partial reversal of colours. Then Poolbeg light was painted black, North Bull had a red tower and North Bank showed an occulting white light from a "tower, painted with red and white bands".

== See also ==
- List of lighthouses in Ireland
