= Poolbeg Lighthouse =

Lighthouse in Dublin, Ireland

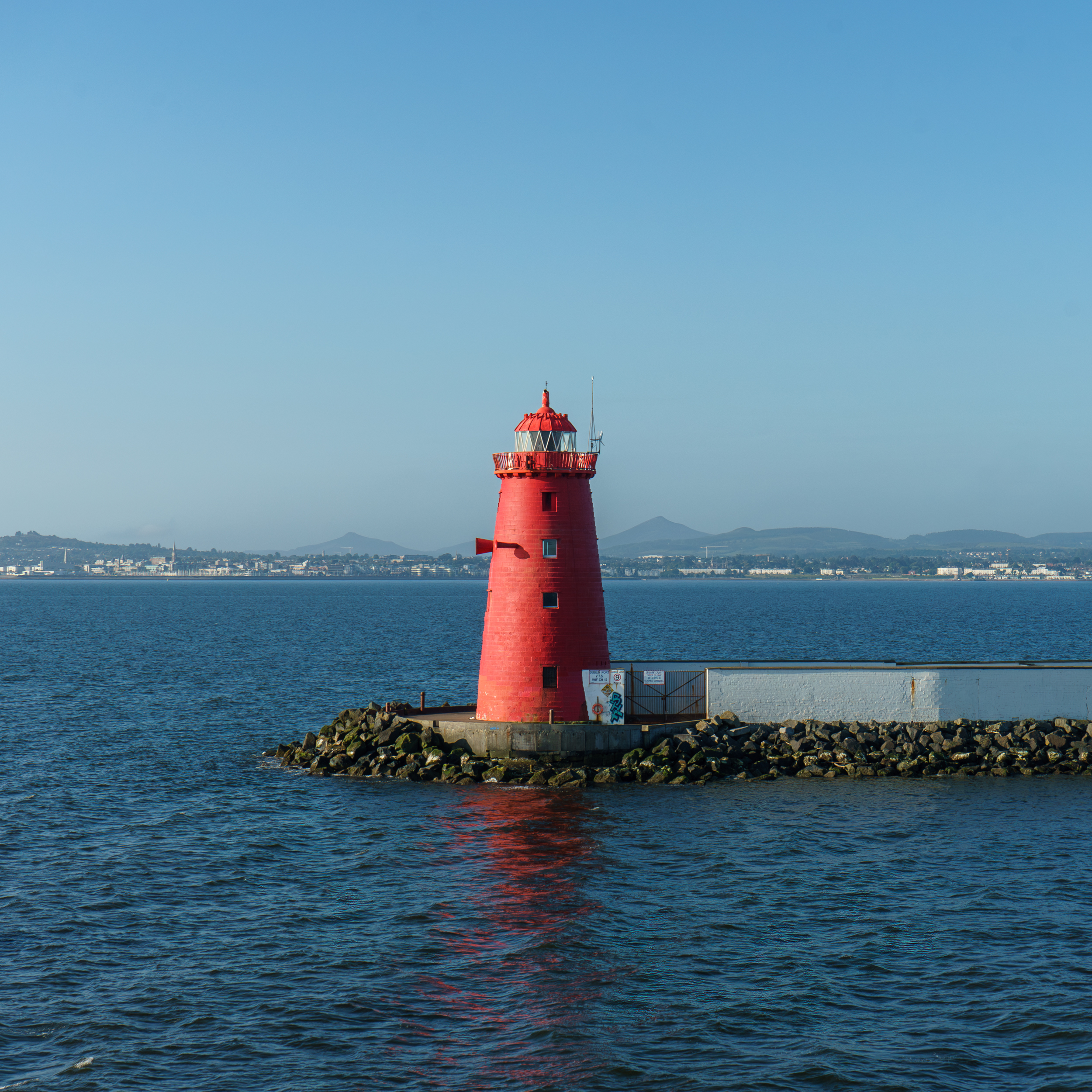
- Poolbeg Lighthouse in 2023
- Location: Dublin, Ireland
- Coordinates: 53°20′31.8″N 6°09′04.7″W

Tower
- Constructed: 1767
- Construction: Granite
- Height: 20 metres (66 ft)
- Shape: Cylindrical tower with balcony and lantern
- Markings: Red painted

Light
- Focal height: 20 metres (66 ft)
- Characteristic: Red light 8 s on, 4 s off, 4 s on, 4 s off

Poolbeg Lighthouse (Irish: Teach Solais an Phoill Bhig) is an active aid to navigation at the mouth of the River Liffey, near Poolbeg in Dublin, Ireland. First established in 1767, it initially operated on candlepower but this was changed to oil in 1786. It was re-designed and re-built into its present form in 1820.

== Location ==
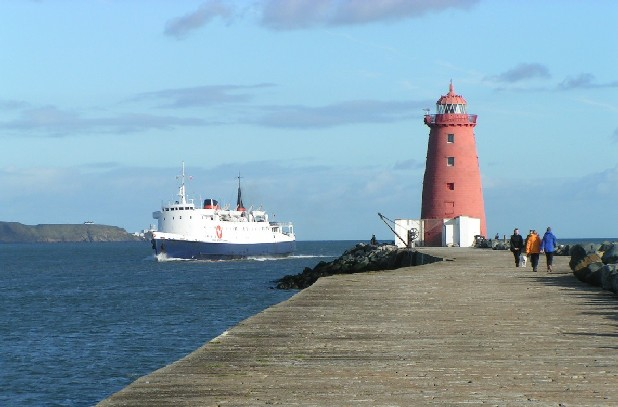
Isle of Man passenger ship, Lady of Mann, passes behind Poolbeg Lighthouse in 2004

The lighthouse, one of a formation of three, is located on the Great South Wall (South Bull Wall), at the Port of Dublin, which extends from Ringsend's Poolbeg peninsula nearly four miles out into Dublin Bay. The wall was the world's longest at the time of its building, and remains one of the longest sea-walls in Europe. One of the other two lighthouses is located on the Bull Wall opposite, and the other on a wooden platform mid-channel.

The Poolbeg Lighthouse is not the most attractive but an iconic feature in the bay, in which it occupies an almost central position. It is nearly equidistant from Dublin, Dún Laoghaire, and Howth, and commands extensive views of the shores of the bay, with an unbroken panorama of the mountains on the south. Howth with its heather-clad hills, bright green fields and rugged reaches of sea cliff, is very visible from this point.

== Original building ==
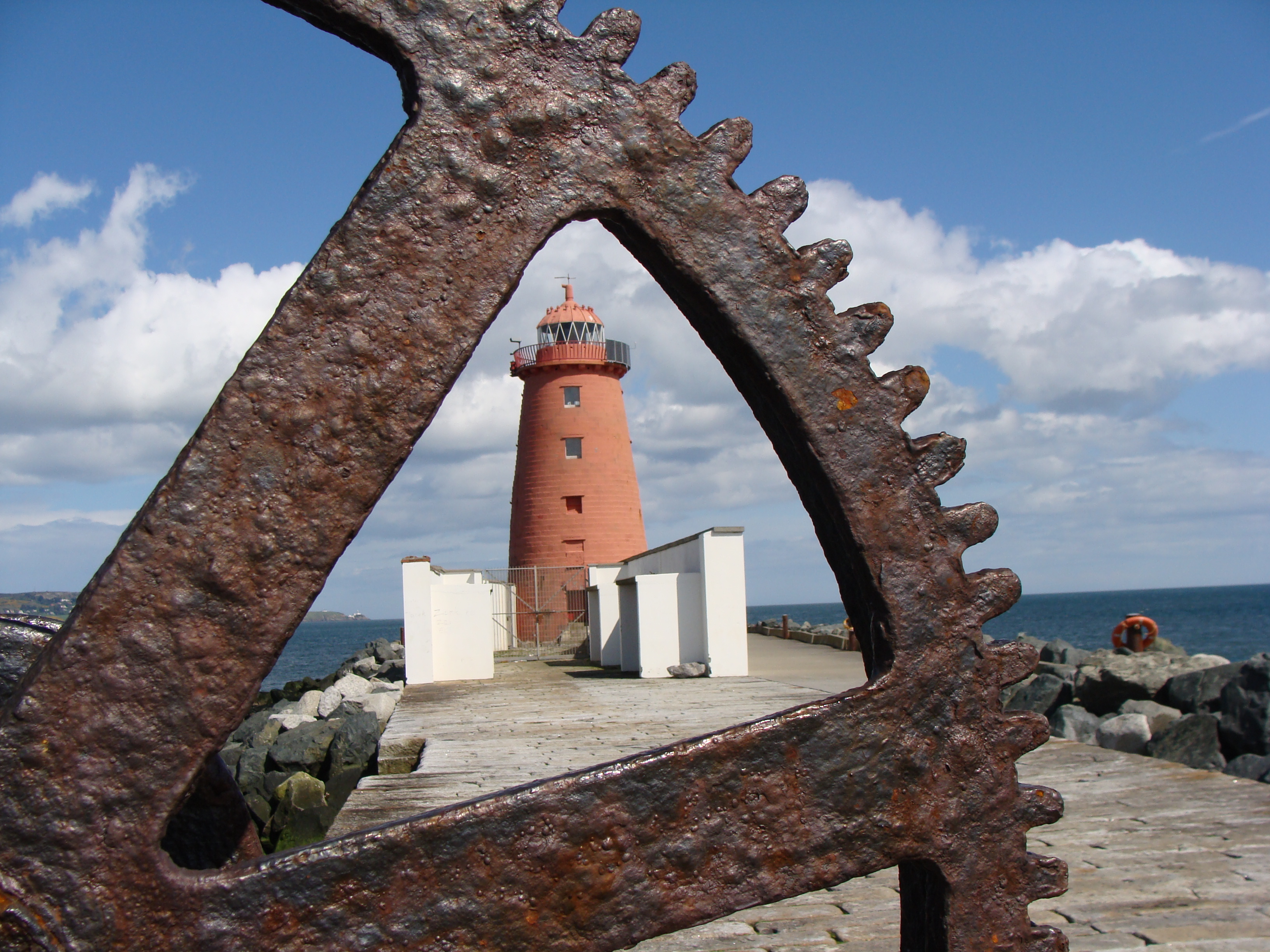
Poolbeg Lighthouse (May 2009)

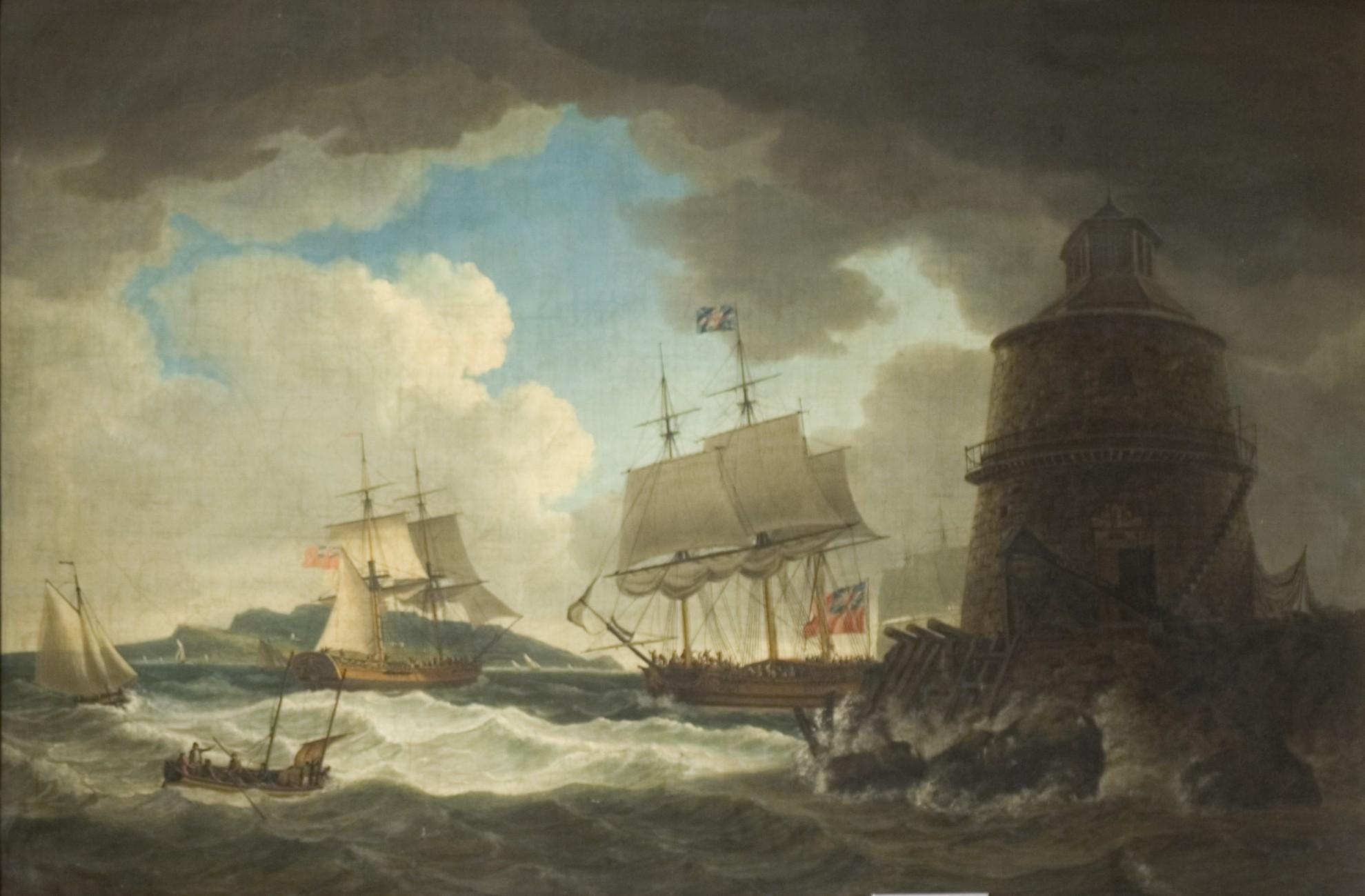
Poolbeg Lighthouse in 1787, a painting by John Thomas Serres

The lighthouse when originally constructed, presented an entirely different appearance from what it does at the present time. It was not as high as the existing structure, it sloped much more rapidly towards the top, and was surmounted by an octagonal lantern with eight heavy glass windows. A stone staircase with an iron balustrade led to the second storey, where an iron gallery surrounded the whole building. The lighthouse was constructed in 1789 by Mr. Smith and affords a striking proof that the greatest difficulties may be overcome by genius and perseverance.

The alteration to the present form was made in the early part of the nineteenth century.

== Management ==
The lighthouse, automated for many years, is managed by Dublin Port Company, whereas most lighthouses in Ireland are managed by the Commissioners of Irish Lights, today part of a larger cross-border body.

== Standard height measurement for Ordnance Survey Ireland ==
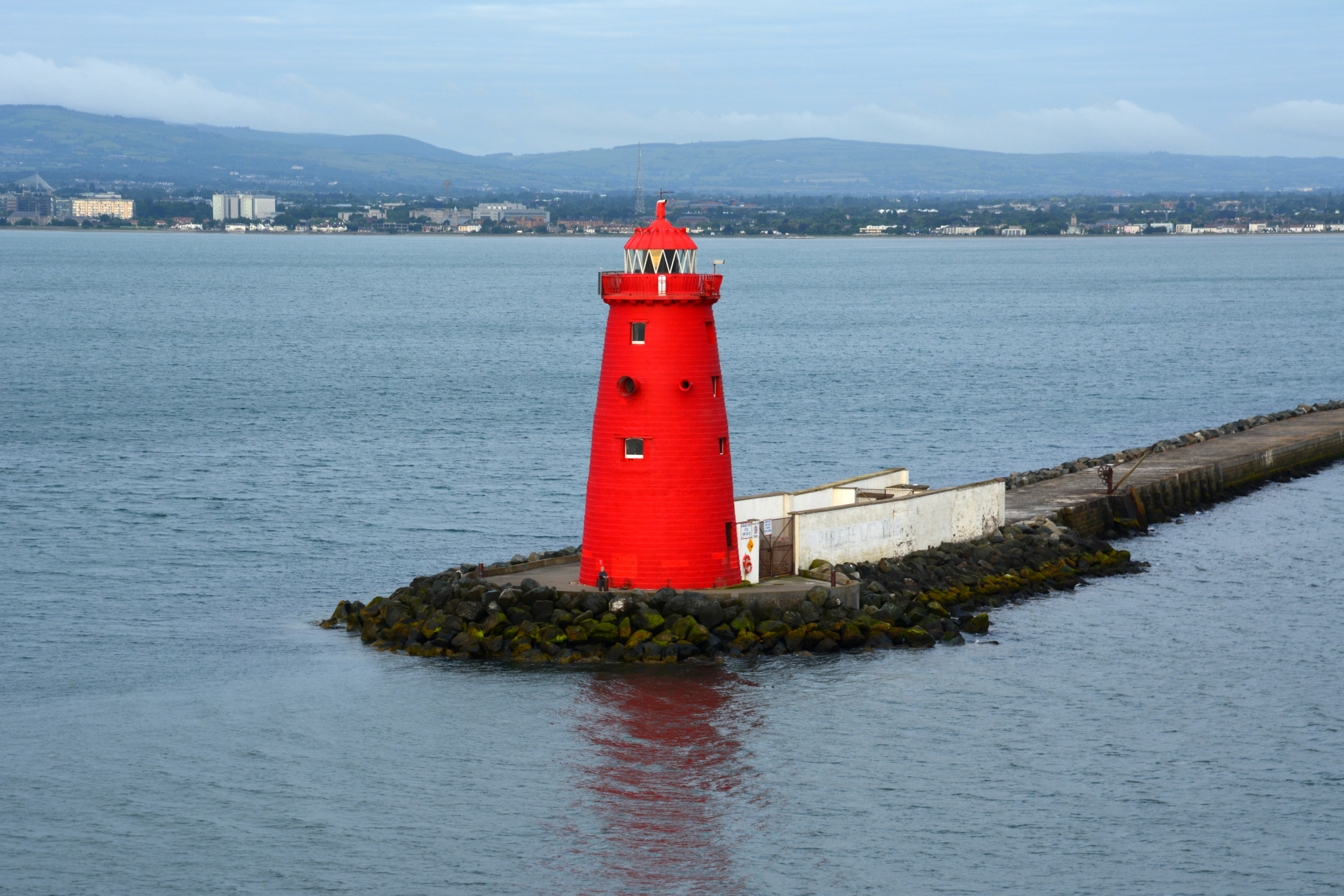
Poolbeg lighthouse, marking the sea end of Great Bull Wall at the entrance of Dublin Port

Historically, the Ordnance Survey Ireland used the low water mark of the spring tide on 8 April 1837 at the Poolbeg Lighthouse as a standard height for all its maps, a practice which continued up until 1958.

== Colouring ==
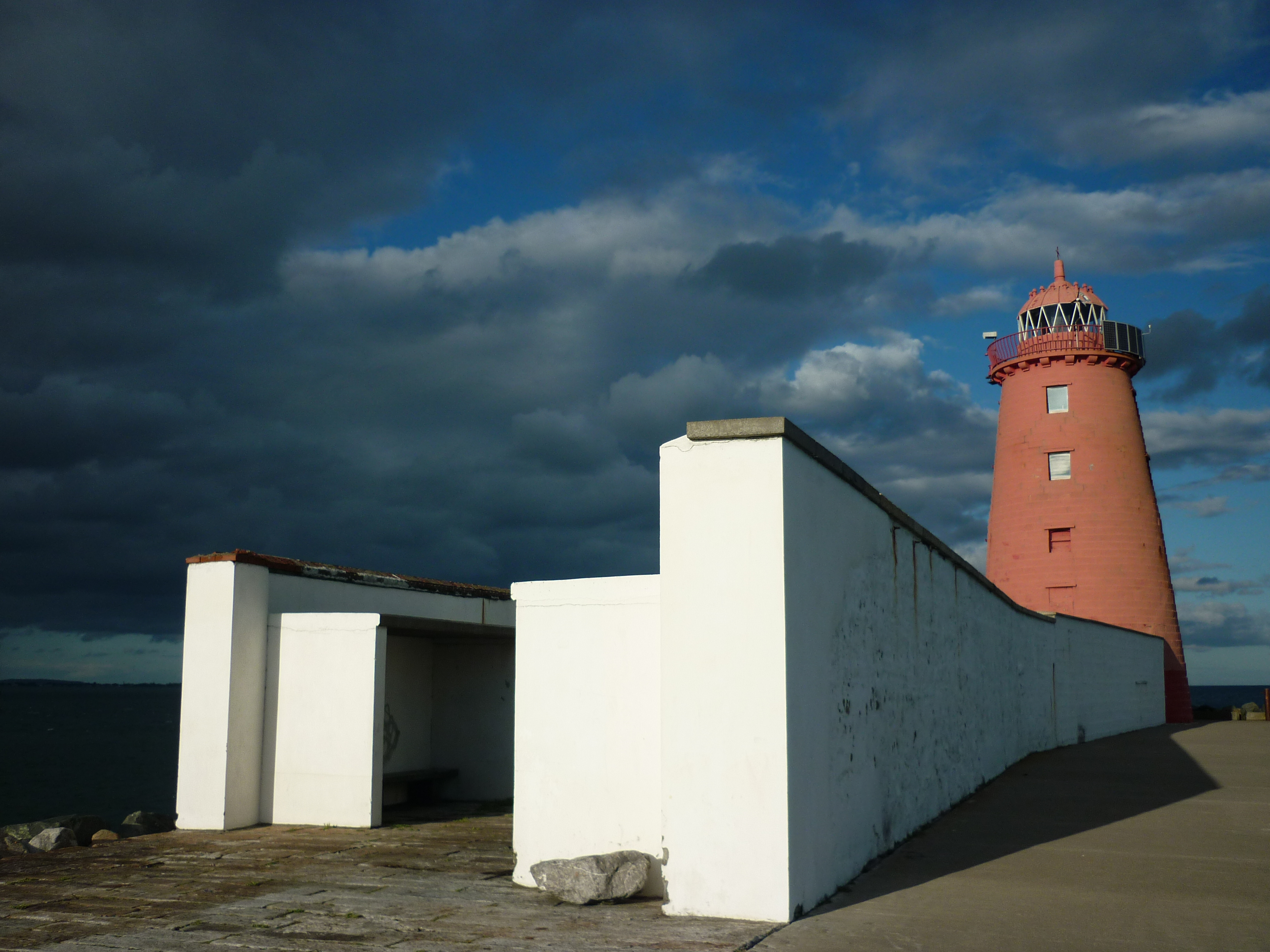
Poolbeg Lighthouse (August 2010)

The Poolbeg Lighthouse is painted red. The green lighthouse on the opposite side of the channel is the North Bull lighthouse, a couple of metres off the end of the North Bull Wall, and another green lighthouse the North Bank Lighthouse is also located next to the shipping channel into Dublin. As with all navigational aids marking a channel, the port side as one heads upstream is indicated by red markers whilst the right hand side or starboard of the channel is green.

== Incidents ==
In 2016, a 48-year-old man drowned in the sea near the lighthouse while playing the augmented-reality video game Ingress, having possibly tripped on a raised water grate at the edge of the pier. The grates have since been removed.

== See also ==
- Lighthouses in Ireland
