= Patrick G. Kennedy =

Irish Jesuit priest (1881–1966)

Patrick G. Kennedy SJ (1881–1966), was an Irish Jesuit priest, naturalist and ornithologist. He was responsible for creating Ireland's first nature reserve at Bull Island in Dublin in 1931. He served as president of the Dublin Naturalist and Field Club (1941–42).

Kennedy was born in Caherconlish, County Limerick in 1881. He was educated at Crescent College and joined the Jesuits in 1898, training in Tullabeg College, Stonyhurst College in England and Milltown Park in Dublin. He taught for a number of years in the Crescent College, Limerick where he was prefect of studies from 1916 to 1925 and Belvedere College, Dublin.

== Publications ==
- An Irish Sanctuary – Birds of the North Bull, by Fr. Patrick G. Kennedy SJ, Dublin: The Sign of The Three Candles, 1953.
- The birds of Ireland, by P. G. Kennedy SJ, and Kevin O'Shiel, 1955.
