= Dollymount =

Locality within the Dublin suburb of Clontarf, Ireland

Dollymount Cnocán Doirinne (Irish)
- Suburban area
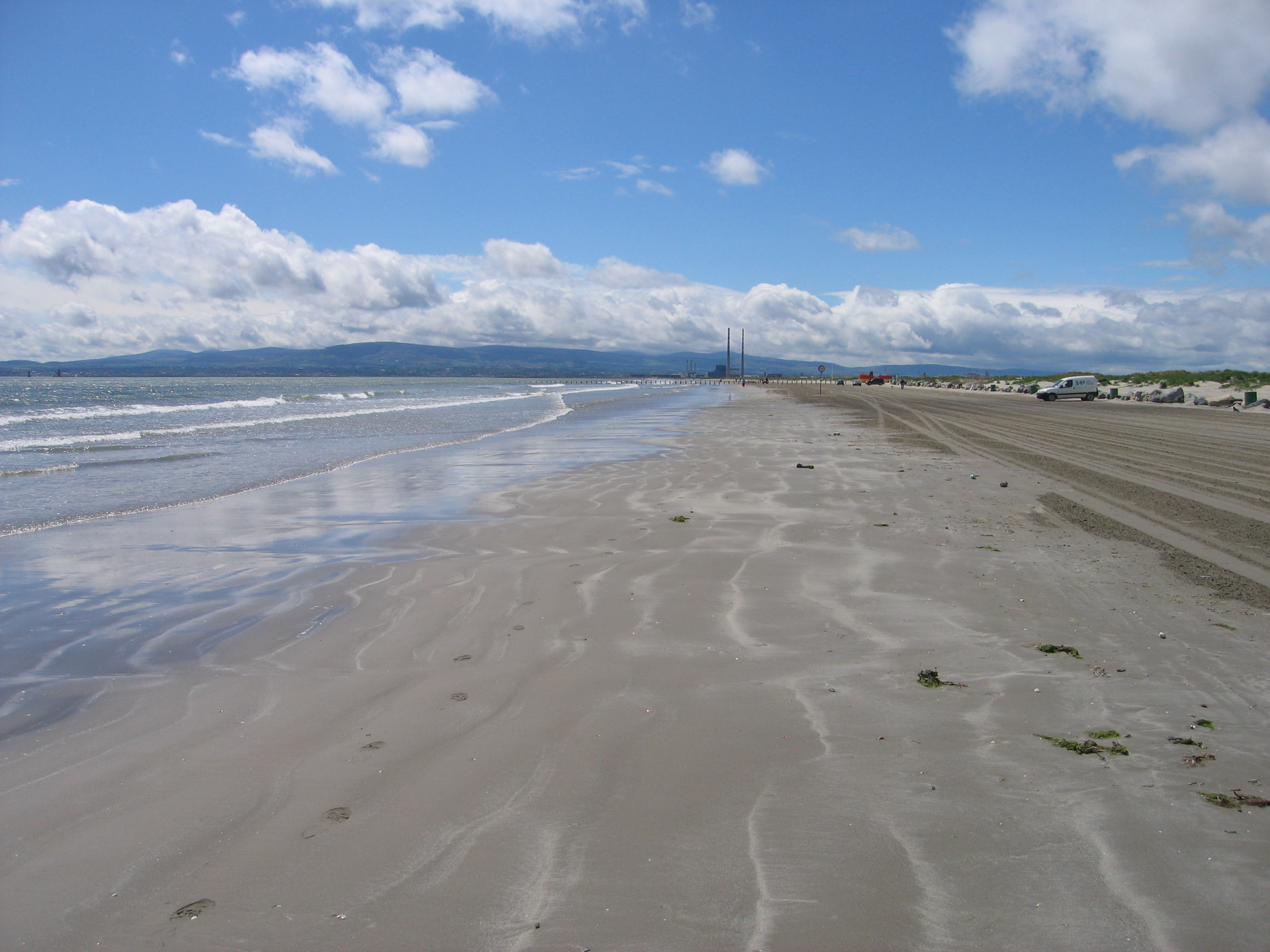
- Dollymount Strand, North Bull Island, looking south

- Location in Dublin
- Coordinates: 53°21′52″N 6°10′35″W
- Country: Ireland
- Province: Leinster
- County: County Dublin
- Local authority: Dublin City Council
- Elevation: 50 m (160 ft)

Dollymount (Irish: Cnocán Doirinne), often known as "Dollyer" to Dubliners, is a coastal suburban area on the north coast of Dublin Bay, within Clontarf, on the northside of Dublin, Ireland, just east of Saint Anne's Park.

== Dollymount Strand ==
The famous Wooden Bridge from Clontarf links to Bull Island and the 5 kilometres long stretch of sandy beach and dunes on the island's eastern shore; while the island is located in Clontarf and Raheny, the beach is called Dollymount Strand.

== Amenities ==
Dollymount is primarily residential, having just a few shops and a restaurant near the fountain pond of St. Anne's Park. Most commercial facilities are found in the main Clontarf centres.

The area has a Roman Catholic church, St. Gabriel's, the third of the three Catholic churches in Clontarf, completed in the 1950s. A much earlier plan to build a second Clontarf Church of Ireland parish church in Dollymount to complement the church on Seafield Road was abandoned in the 19th century.

Manresa Jesuit Centre of Spirituality, located in what was Baymount Castle, is a Jesuit retreat house which hosts meetings and retreats. Visitors on retreat regularly record their appreciation of neighbouring Saint Anne's Park, Bull Island and Dollymount Strand.

== History ==
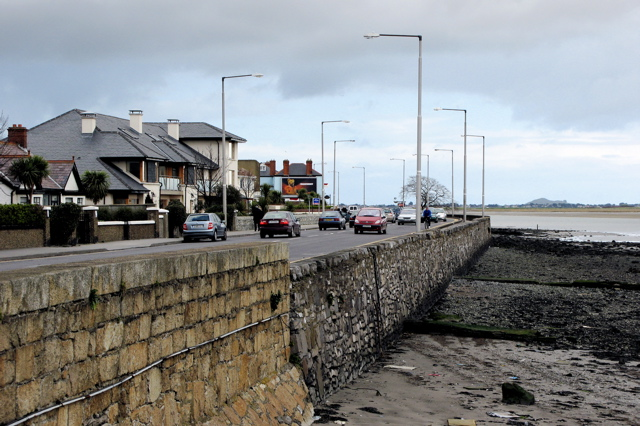
Clontarf Road at Dollymount

Dollymount lies within the district of Clontarf, which surrounds it (as the citywards part of Bull Island is part of Clontarf). For history before the 19th century, see the relevant article. For details of the origin, from "The Neighbourhood of Dublin" (Weston St. John Joyce, 3rd edition, Dublin, 1920):
"The name of Dollymount would seem to have originated with a house bearing that title which stood on or adjoining the site of Sea Park in Mount Prospect Avenue, and which is shown in Duncan's Map of 1820. "Dollymount House" appears in the Dublin Directory up to 1836, after which it disappears, doubtless having been renamed, and in 1838 the name appears for the first time as that of a district, under the heading of "Green Lanes, Dollymount." It is stated that the designation was adopted in the first instance by a member of the Vernon family as a compliment to his wife, by name Dorothy, or Dolly Vernon." The Green Lanes are still referred to as simply "Clontarf" in Thom's Irish Almanac & Official Directory of 1849.

== See also ==
- List of towns and villages in Ireland
