= Dublin Bay =

Inlet of the Irish Sea around Dublin, Ireland

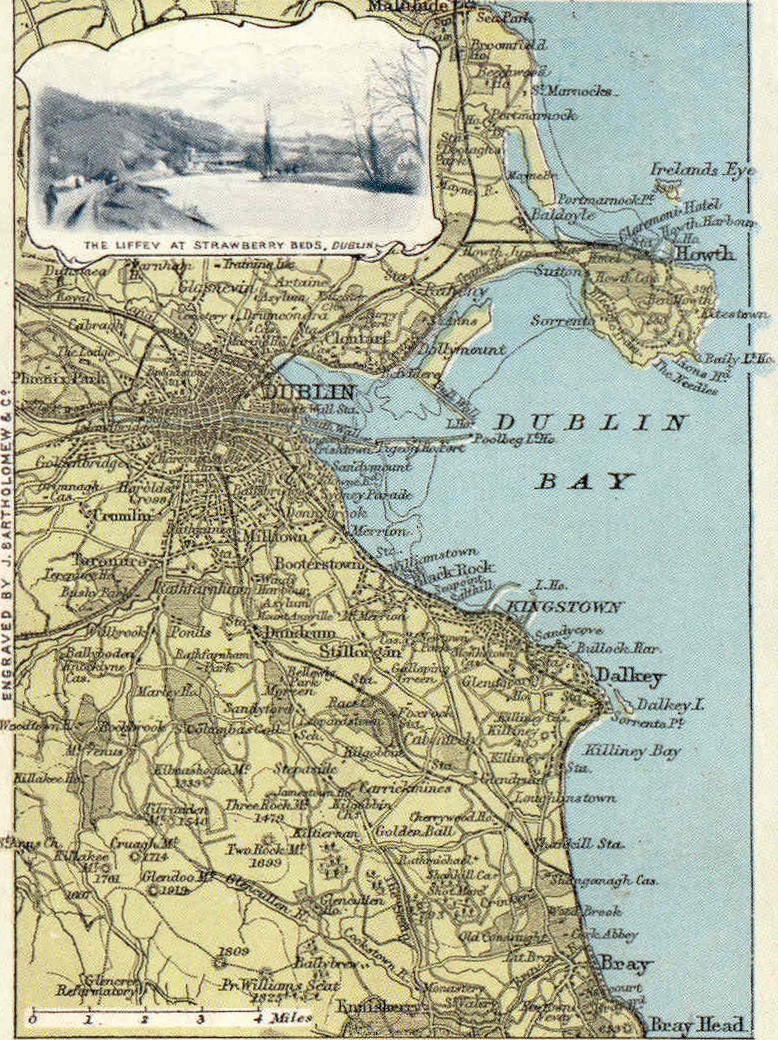
- Map from late 19th-century postcard

- Location within Dublin
- Coordinates: 53°20′N 6°07′W
- Part of: Irish Sea
- Primary inflows: River Liffey; River Tolka
- Settlements: Dublin, Dún Laoghaire

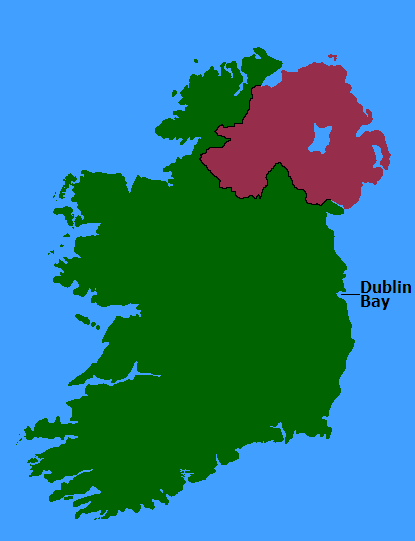
Dublin Bay in relation to Ireland

Dublin Bay (Irish: Cuan Bhaile Átha Cliath) is a C-shaped inlet of the Irish Sea on the east coast of Ireland. The bay is about 10 kilometres wide along its north–south base, and 7 km in length to its apex at the centre of the city of Dublin; stretching from Howth Head in the north to Dalkey Point in the south. North Bull Island is situated in the northwest part of the bay, where one of two major inshore sand banks lay, and features a 5 km long sandy beach, Dollymount Strand, fronting an internationally recognised wildfowl reserve. Many of the rivers of Dublin reach the Irish Sea at Dublin Bay: the River Liffey, with the River Dodder flow received less than 1 km inland, River Tolka, and various smaller rivers and streams.

The metropolitan area of the city of Dublin surrounds three sides of the bay (the north, west, and south), while the Irish Sea lies to the east. Dublin was founded by the Vikings at the point where they were able to ford the River Liffey with the first wattle bridge up from the estuary. The city spread from its birthplace, around what is now the James's Gate area, out along the coastline, northeast towards Howth and southeast towards Dalkey.

UNESCO has designated Dublin Bay a 'biosphere reserve' in recognition of its unique ecological habitat and biological diversity; the bay is also covered by multiple other official and protective designations.

== Features ==
The bay is rather shallow with many sandbanks and rocky outcrops, and was notorious in the past for shipwrecks, especially when the wind was from the east. Until modern times, many ships and their passengers were lost along the treacherous coastline from Howth to Dun Laoghaire, less than a kilometre from shore. Early maps of the bay carefully show narrow shipping channels and mooring areas.

=== Sand banks and islands ===
The bay had two inshore sand banks, the North Bull and the South Bull. With the building of the Bull Wall, the North Bull began to build up rapidly, forming North Bull Island (often simply "Bull Island"). A southern wall had earlier been built – the Great South Wall – but did not result in island formation, the South Bull remaining today an area of mud flats and strand. In addition there are several offshore sandbanks, notably Kish Bank (on which a lighthouse stands). Another sand bank-turned-island, Clontarf or Mud Island, shown on earlier maps, has disappeared.

=== Coastline ===
From north to south, Dublin Bay features beaches at Sutton Strand, Dollymount Strand on North Bull Island, Sandymount, Seapoint and south of Dún Laoghaire. The remaining coast is either rocky (with cliffs on Howth Head, for example) or mud coming up to sea walls. In most parts, the land slopes gently down to the sea, but aside from Howth Head, there are bluffs along much of the Raheny coastline, and the sharper slopes just inland at Monkstown and Old Dunleary.

=== Inflows ===
By far the most significant inflow is that of the River Liffey, with the waters of its many tributaries, including the Dodder, Poddle and Camac. Entering between East Wall and Clontarf is the second of Dublin's rivers by volume, the River Tolka. Other flows into the bay include two streams in Sutton, one at Kilbarrack, four crossing Raheny, and one each in Clontarf, Sandymount, Merrion, Booterstown and Blackrock, as well as two in greater Dún Laoghaire. The Liffey and the Tolka have experienced a massive improvement in water quality in recent decades, but there are still occasional problems with some of the smaller watercourses, such as the Santry River, Naniken River and Elm Park and Trimleston Streams.

=== Poolbeg stacks ===
One dominating feature of the skyline round the bay are the 207 metres (679 ft) chimney stacks of the Poolbeg Generating Station which have become a protected structure since 2014.

== History ==
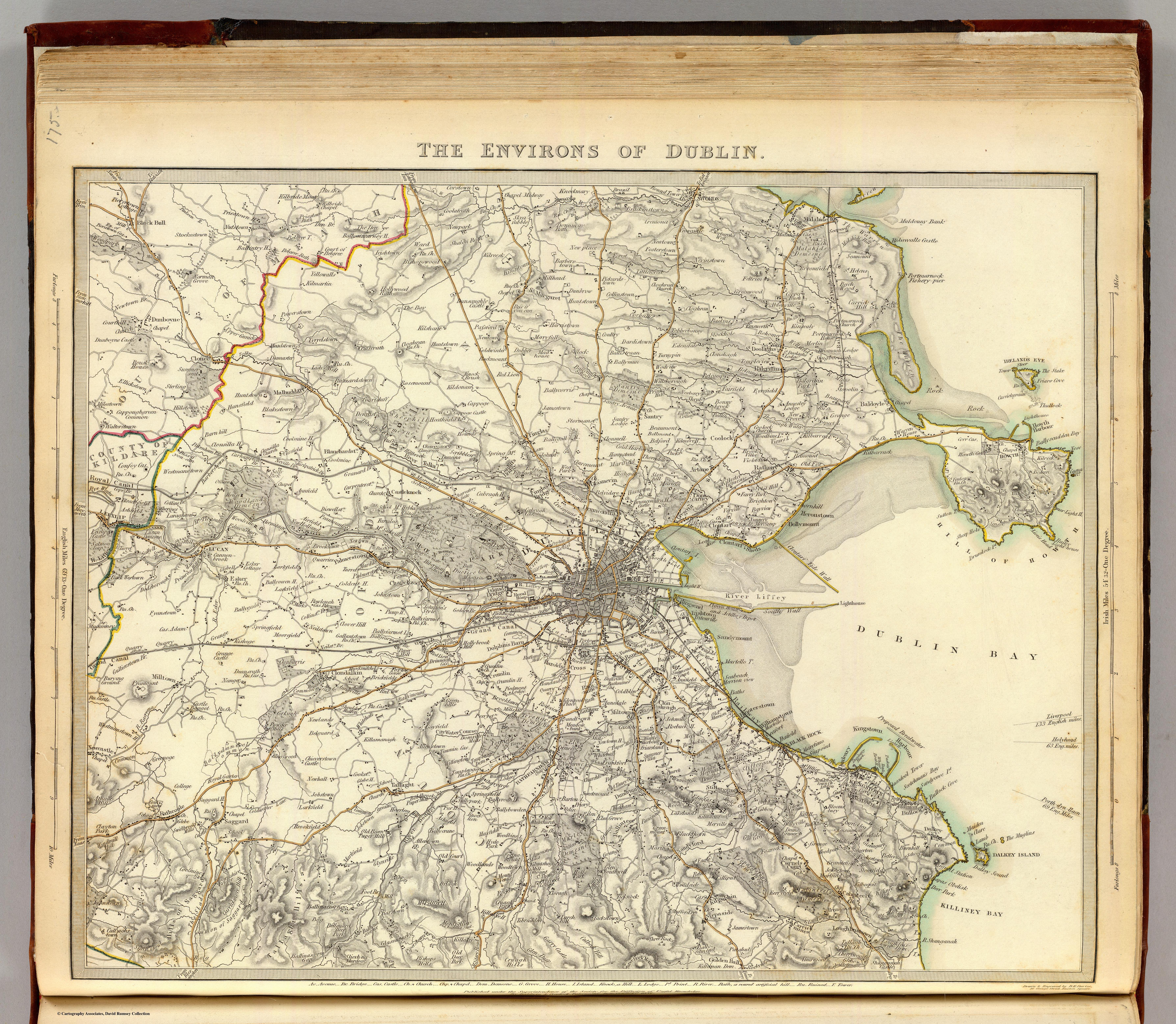
An 1837 view of the bay before Bull Island was fully formed

Dublin Bay was first settled c. 4000 BC, in Ireland's Mesolithic. Ptolemy's map of Ireland (AD 140)places a settlement called "Eblana" and a river Oboka in the region of Dublin Bay. In the 9th century AD, the Vikings settled and formed the Kingdom of Dublin.

As a port for seagoing vessels, Dublin had, prior to the eighteenth century, laboured under serious disadvantages. The Bar of Dublin, an infamous sandbar spreading across the mouth of the Liffey between the great sandbanks known as the North and South Bull (a short distance east of Sutton, and due north of Dún Laoghaire) was only covered by six feet of water at low tide. During the first half of the seventeenth century, this had necessitated for ships of any considerable draught to unload parts of their cargoes at Dalkey before carrying on. It was not until 19 September 1662 that the Privy Council of Ireland, by an order, appointed 'Custom House Quay' (now Wellington Quay), located up the River Liffey in the city centre, as the sole place for landing and loading the imports and exports of Dublin. The original Custom House was erected at the quay sometime later in 1707.

The bay was charted and mapped by William Bligh at the start of the nineteenth century. Bligh also proposed improvements to Dublin Port and a refuge harbour at Dún Laoghaire.

Over 500 crew and passengers (mostly military personnel) were lost when the steamship RMS Leinster was torpedoed and sunk by the German U-boat UB-123 on 10 October 1918. She lies in 33 metres (108 ft) of water at 53°18.88′N 5°47.71′W.

In 1972, the Dublin Port and Docks Board proposed building an oil refinery in Dublin Bay. The plan was vigorously opposed by environmentalists, including Dublin City Councillor Seán D. Loftus, on the grounds that it posed a serious risk of pollution. Loftus, a lifelong campaigner for Dublin Bay, changed his name by deed poll to "Seán Dublin Bay Loftus" when standing for election to the Dáil. Although he was not elected, he succeeded in publicising the issue and the proposal was eventually turned down by the Minister for Local Government, James Tully. (Loftus later changed his name by deed poll to "Seán Dublin Bay Rockall Loftus" as part of a campaign to press the Irish Government to make a territorial claim to the Rockall islet off the coast of County Donegal). Loftus also led opposition to the 2002 and subsequent applications by the Dublin Port Company to fill in 52 acres (210,000 m^{2}) of Dublin Bay. Other suggestions for the bay have included a proposal to build giant underwater gas storage tanks, and to infill the near-lagoon behind North Bull Island to form a leisure park.

=== Infill ===
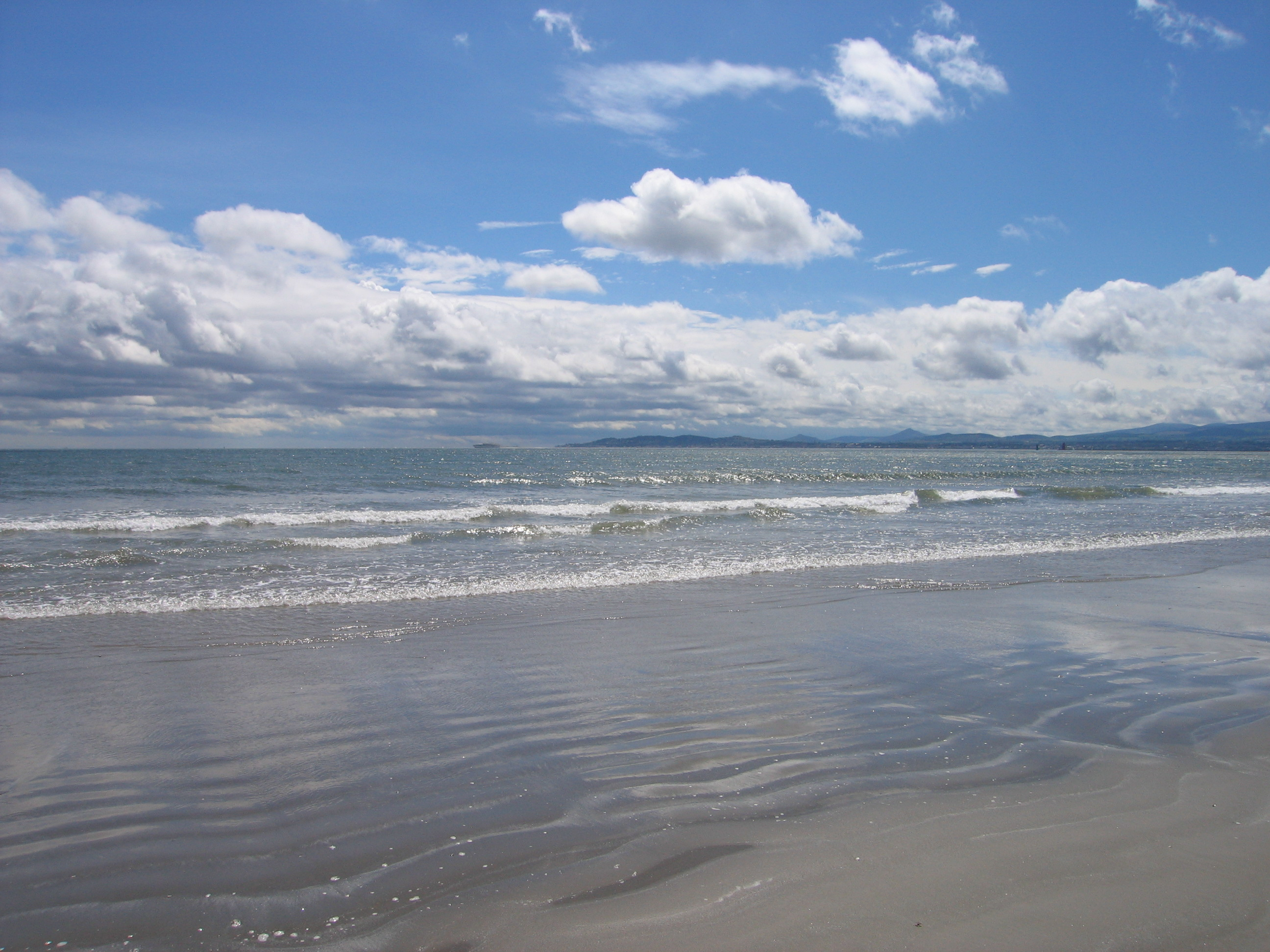
Dublin's bay viewed from Dollymount Strand

In the summer of 2010, An Bord Pleanála refused permission to the Dublin Port Company to proceed with its plans to infill a further 52 acres (210,000 m^{2}) of Dublin Bay. The proposed infill, which has been vehemently opposed by residents, politicians, environmentalists and others around the bay for over 20 years, was refused on one point. An Bord Pleanála rejected nine out of ten of its own inspector's recommendations for refusal, but refused permission on the basis that it was not satisfied that the proposed development would not adversely affect the integrity of the South Dublin Bay and River Tolka Estuary proposed Special Protection Area and adversely affect the natural heritage of Dublin Bay. Within a few months of the decision, the Dublin Port Company applied for and received a pre-application meeting with An Bord Pleanála. The Dublin Port Company has redrafted their proposal in relation to the SPA boundary and may resubmit an application for the project.

== Shipping and navigation ==
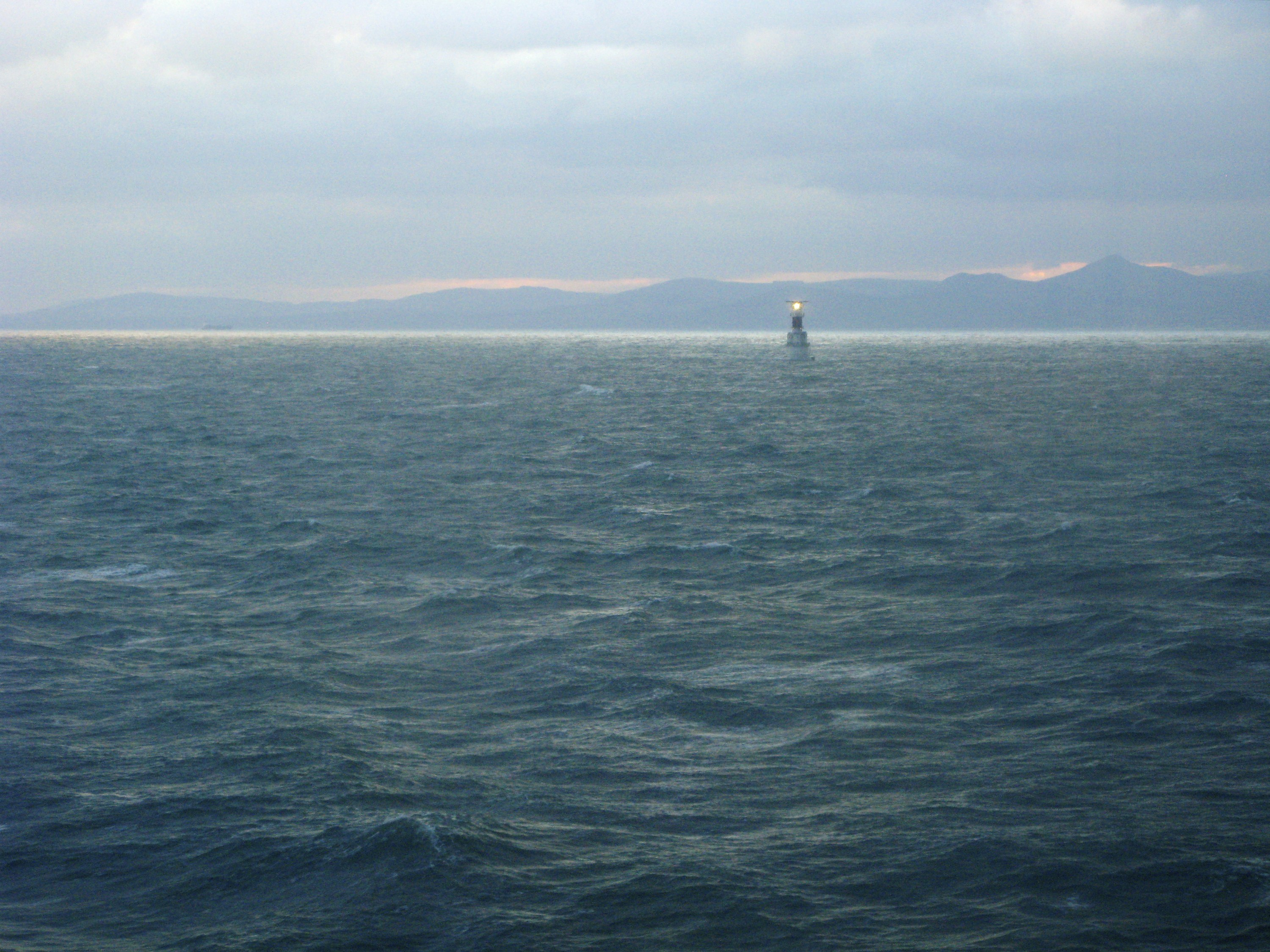
Kish Lighthouse (erected 1965) with the Wicklow Mountains in the background, as viewed from a Dublin-bound passenger ferry

Dublin Bay has a significant flow of shipping, mostly freight but also including passenger (car) ferries and cruise ships. The port authority offers pilotage where needed. Multiple lighthouses help secure passage, and the Commissioners of Irish Lights have their headquarters at Dún Laoghaire within the bay.

== Flooding ==
Coastal flooding can occur at high tide at several points, notably the city side of Clontarf, and Sandymount.

== Pollution ==
The bay has been subject to pollution from the inflowing watercourses, shipping and port activity, the main water treatment plant for Dublin and sewage discharges at other points, and at times some of its bathing areas are unavailable.

== Designations ==
Parts of the bay are designated and protected in various ways, including:

- Proposed NHA - North and South Dublin Bay
- Special Area of Conservation - North and South Dublin Bay, and a corridor from Rockabill Island (north of the bay) to Dalkey Island
- Special Protection Area - North Bull Island, and a stretch from the estuary of the River Tolka to Sandymount Strand
- Ramsar and Biosphere Reserve - North Bull Island

== Sport and leisure ==
Burgee of Dublin Bay Sailing Club, established in 1884

Dublin Bay supports a wide range of leisure activities, from swimming through kayaking, yachting, kite-surfing to diving.

== Popular culture ==
James Joyce set much of the action in his novel Ulysses around the bay, from the Forty Foot bathing place—in which the character Buck Mulligan washed on Bloomsday morning—to Howth, where Leopold Bloom had sex with his wife Molly under the rhododendrons.

== Gallery ==
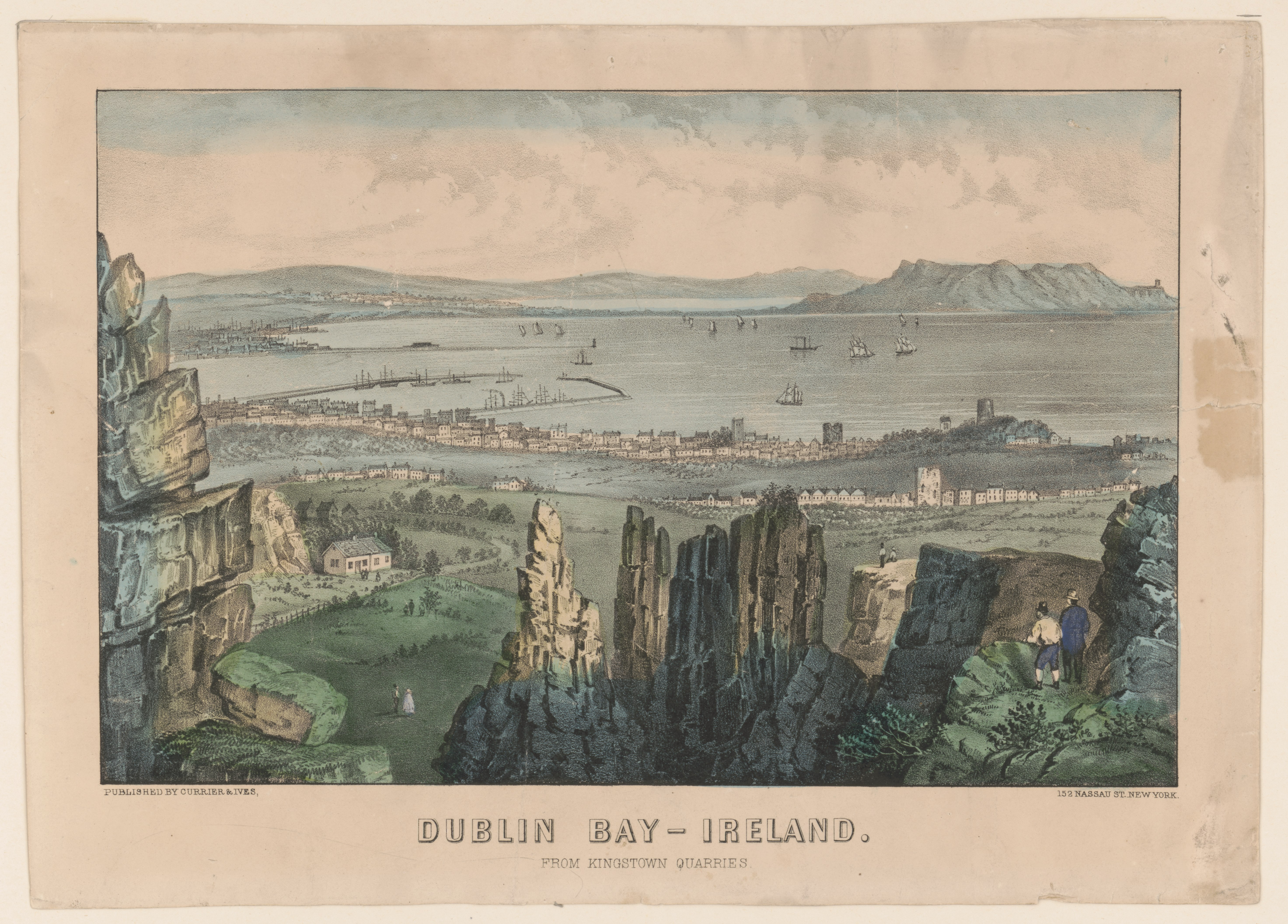
Dublin Bay from "Kingstown Quarries" aka Dalkey quarry (c. 1856–1907)

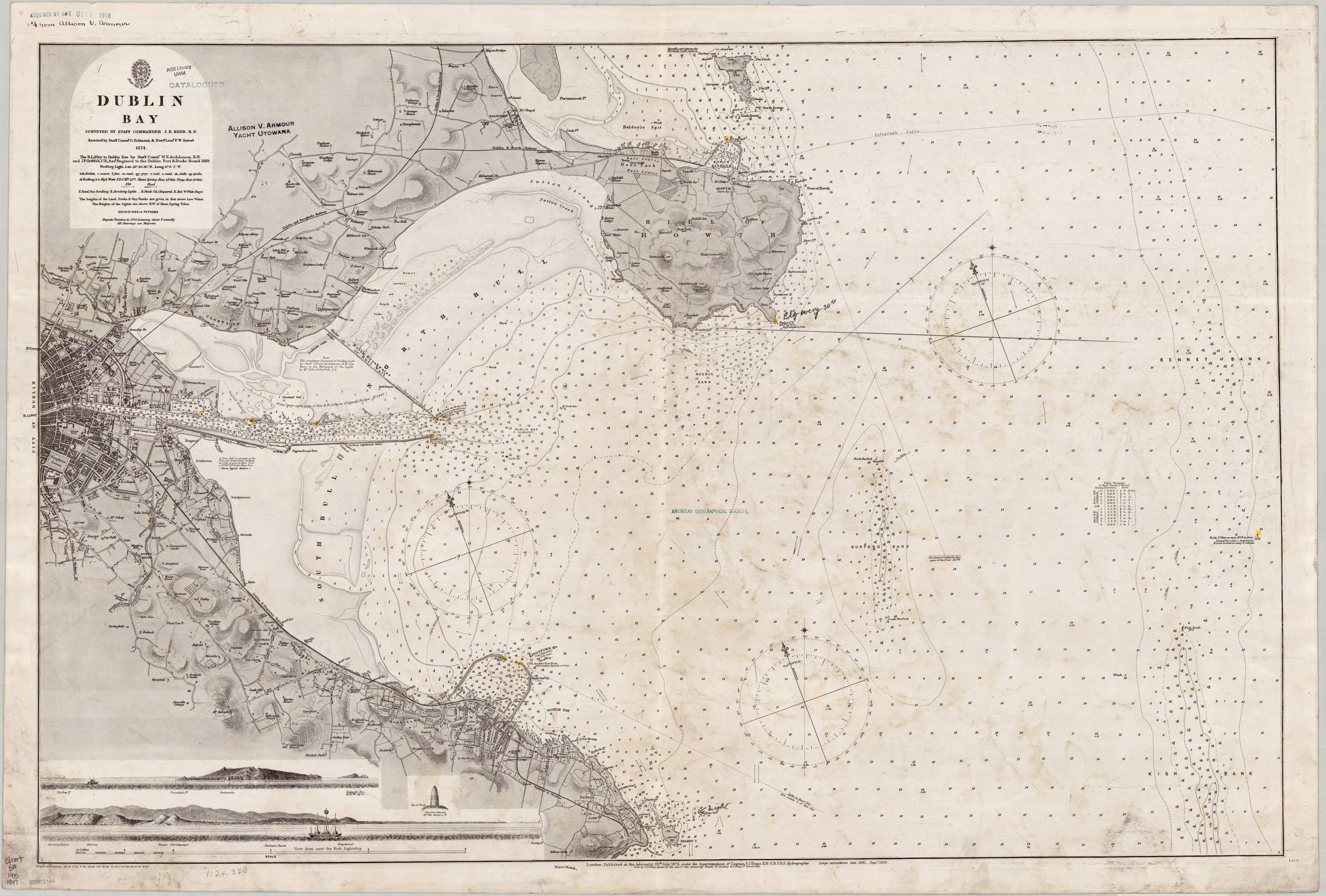
Admiralty chart of the bay, published in 1875

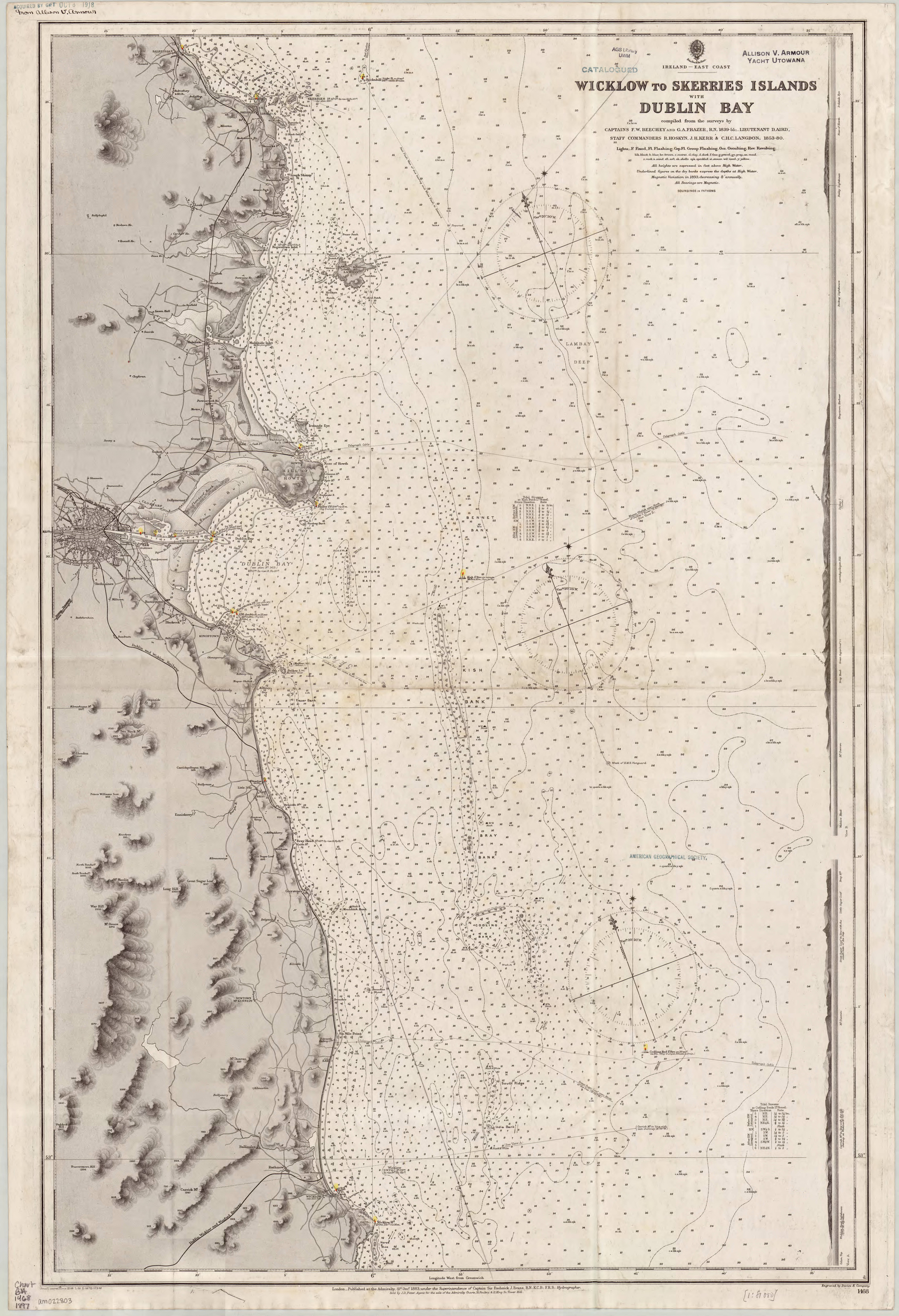
Admiralty chart of the bay in its wider context, 1883

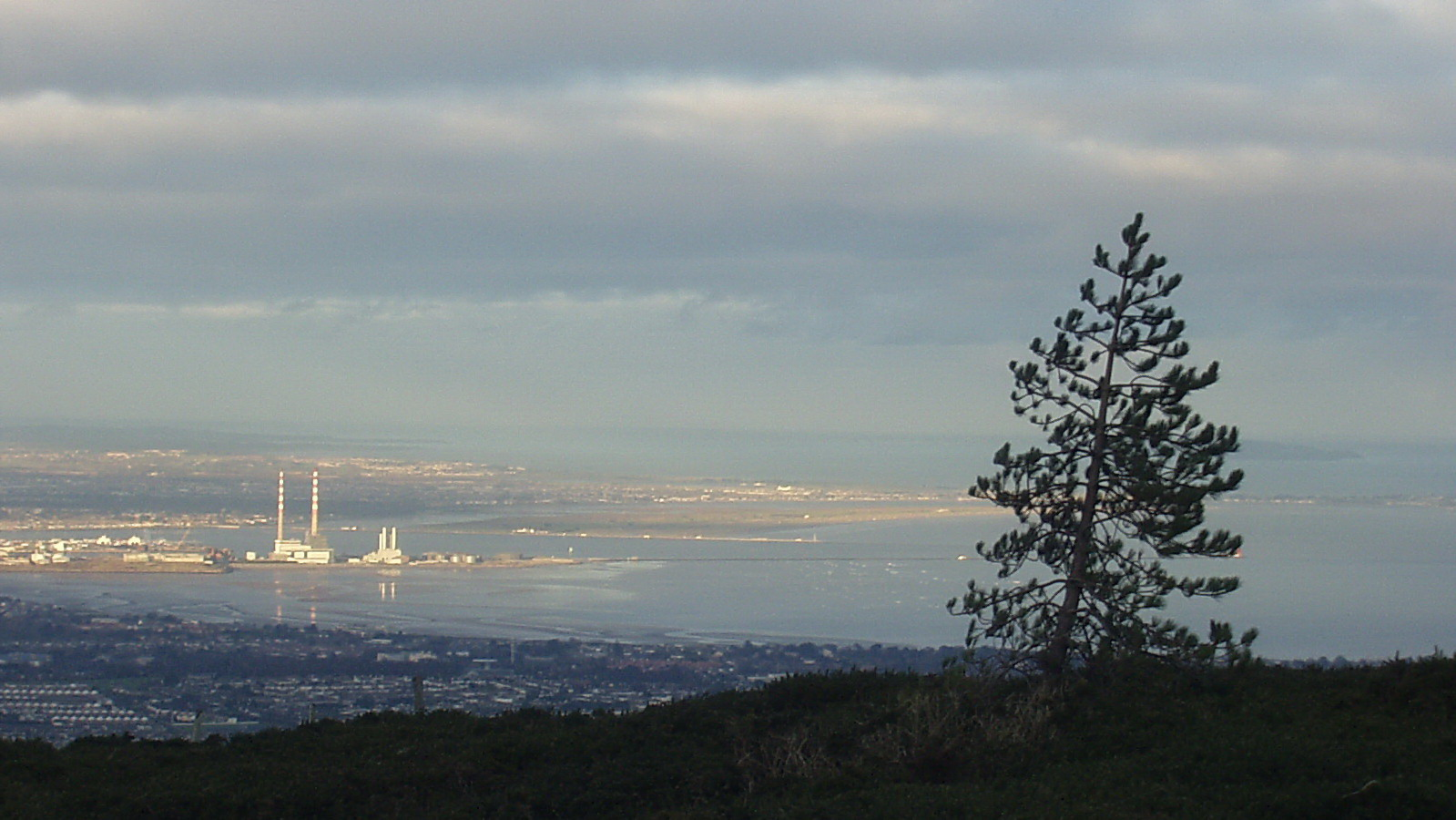
Dublin Bay as viewed from Three Rock Mountain, 2007

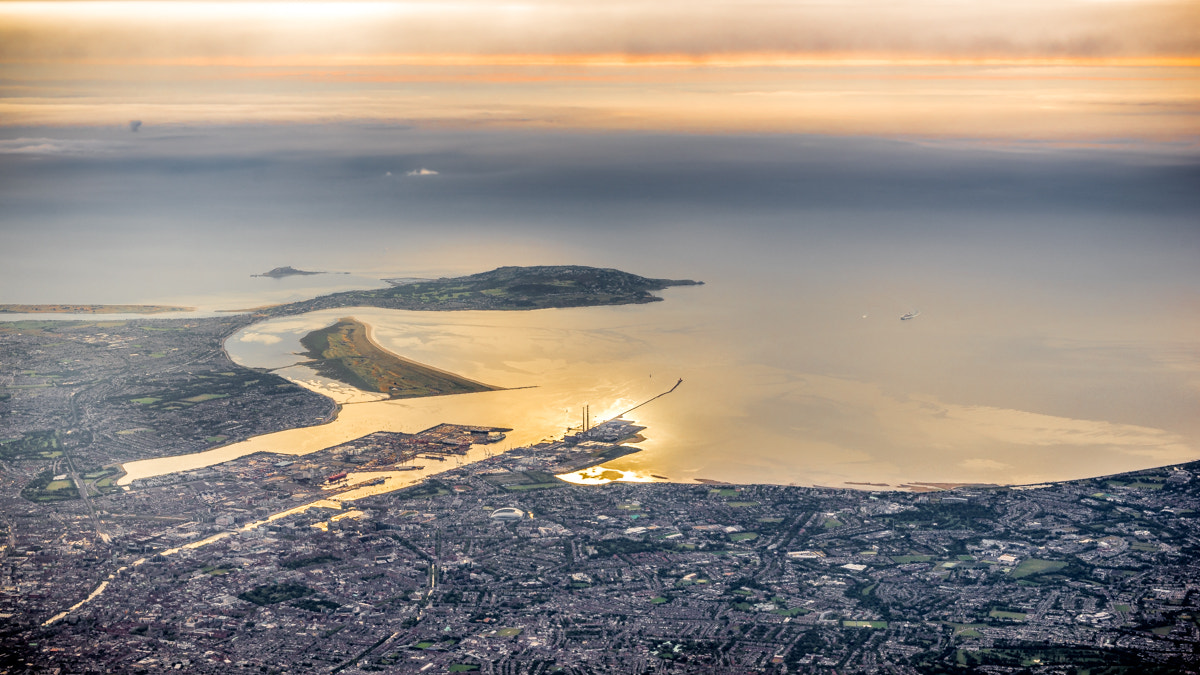
Aerial view of the bay, 2015

== See also ==
- Dublin Port
