= Bull Wall =

Sea wall and breakwater at the Port of Dublin, Ireland

- Balla an Bhulla (Irish)
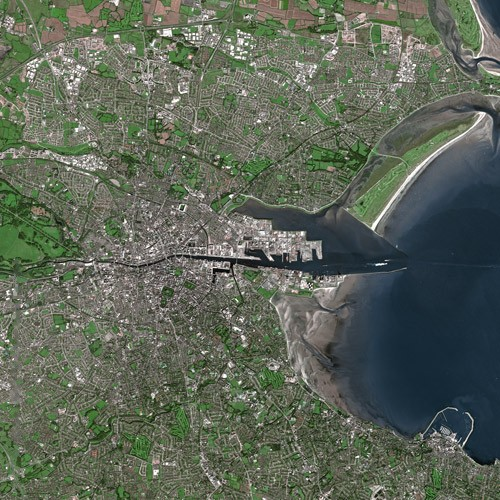
- Interactive map of Bull Wall
- 53.3521°N 6.1647°W
- Location: Clontarf, Dublin, Ireland

History
- Built: 1820 – 1825

Site notes
- Architect: George Halpin

The Bull Wall (Irish: Balla an Bhulla), or North Bull Wall (Irish: Balla an Bhulla Thuaidh), at the Port of Dublin, extending from the estuary of the River Tolka and the district of Clontarf out nearly three km into Dublin Bay, is one of the two defining sea walls of the port, and faces the earlier-constructed Great South Wall (or South Bull Wall). It has one of a trio of port lighthouses at the end of its extension breakwater, and a statue of Realt na Mara ('Mary, Queen of the Sea') partway along, and was responsible for the formation of North Bull Island with its nearly five km of beach.

== History ==
=== Background ===
Dublin Bay had a long-running problem with silting, including at the mouth of the River Liffey, and held major sand banks, notably the North Bull and South Bull, to either side of the Liffey mouth, along with the Kish Bank over 11 km out to sea. Between the North and South Bulls, a sand bar existed, rising over time, limiting access to the city quays.

After years of primitive dredging, an attempt to maintain a clear main channel to Dublin more effectively was begun when, in 1715, the first piles were driven of what was to become the Great South Wall, completed in 1730 to 1731. This barrier was breached by storm action some years later, and in 1761, a stone pier was commenced, working from the Poolbeg Lighthouse, 1768, back to shore, the construction, of massive granite blocks, being completed in 1795. It was during this period that the building of a North Wall was also proposed, and when it was seen that the South Wall did not solve the silting problem, the authorities responsible for Dublin Port commissioned studies on the matter. Captain William Bligh, of Mutiny on the Bounty fame, surveyed Dublin Bay for the Ballast Board in 1801, highlighting the potential of the North Bull sand bank and proposed a design for the wall that was ultimately not used.

In 1981 the Island was designated a UNESCO biosphere reserve.

=== Bull Bridge, North Bull Wall and the beginning of Bull Island ===
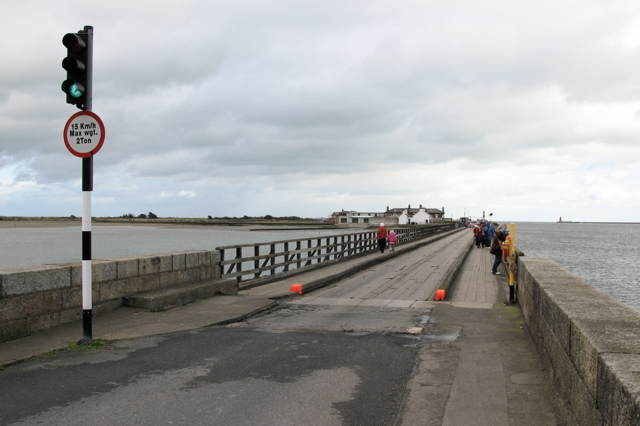
Bull Wall Bridge

A wooden bridge, the first Bull Bridge, was erected in 1819 to facilitate the construction of the actual stone wall, based on a design by Ballast Board engineer, George Halpin.

Started in 1820, the wall was completed in 1825, at a cost of 95,000 pounds. The total length of the wall is 3,200 yards (2,900 m), and there are no parapets. The majority of the wall stands clear of even flood tides, and has a paved surface, but the last stage is in the form of a breakwater, submerged at high tide; the upper surface of this part is not smoothed. At the end of the wall is a masonry base with a lighthouse structure, formerly painted red and now painted green.

Over the succeeding 48 years, the natural tidal effects created by the two sea walls deepened the entry to the Liffey from 1.8 m to 4.8 m. Much of the silt now scoured from the river course was deposited on the North Bull, and a true island, North Bull Island, began to emerge, with Dubliners venturing out to the growing beach. The volume of visitors was increased by the commencement of horse tram services to Clontarf in 1873, and further by the laying of a tram line to Howth, and a Coast Guard station was built at the landward end of the North Bull Wall.

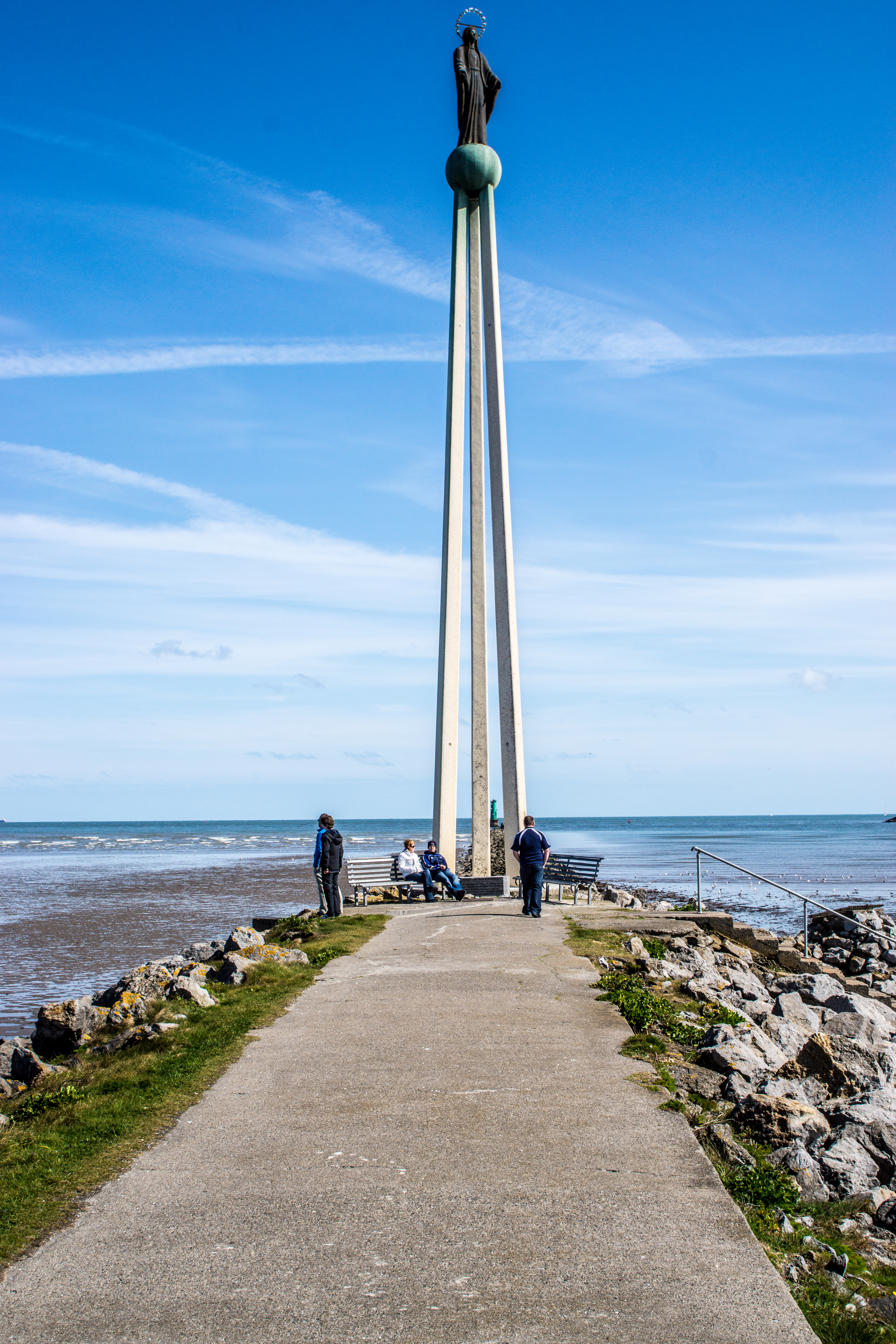
Réalt na Mara on the Bull Wall

=== Réalt na Mara ===
While the basic structure of the wall has remained unchanged since the late 19th century, a significant addition was that of a statue of Réalt na Mara ('Our Lady, Star of the Sea'), erected from subscriptions from dockers, others working around Dublin Port, and a range of companies. The idea for the statue was suggested in 1950, the foundation stone was blessed on 19 June 1961, and the statue was unveiled and blessed on 24 September 1972. The structure comprises a trio of concrete pillars meeting in a globe, on which the crowned statue of Mary stands; sculpted by Cecil King. The monument is floodlit at night and visible across Dublin Bay.

== Flora ==
The dominant plant species on the Bull Island is Cordgrass (Spartina Anglica) which is an invasive species which grows mostly in mud and sand. The species has an unusual origin. it is a hybrid of Spartina Alterniflora which is a native on the east coast of America and believed to have been introduced to Southampton UK in 1829 and Spartina Maritima a native species of Europe.

== Amenities ==
The wall features multiple public bathing shelters (each designated male or female), with steps down to the water. These were designed by Herbert Simms in his role as Dublin Corporation Housing Architect. The water is close by only at mid- to high-tide. There are a number of car parking places, and a public toilet and information signs.

== Status ==
The Bull Bridge and Bull Wall are technically were owned by the State company which owns and manages Dublin Port. In 2013, Dublin Port announced plans to gift this land to public ownership.
