= Dublin Port Company =

Government agency of Ireland

- Native name: Comhlacht Chalafort Átha Cliath
- Formerly: Dublin Port and Docks Board
- Founded: 28 February 1997; 28 years ago in Dublin, Ireland
- Website: www.dublinport.ie

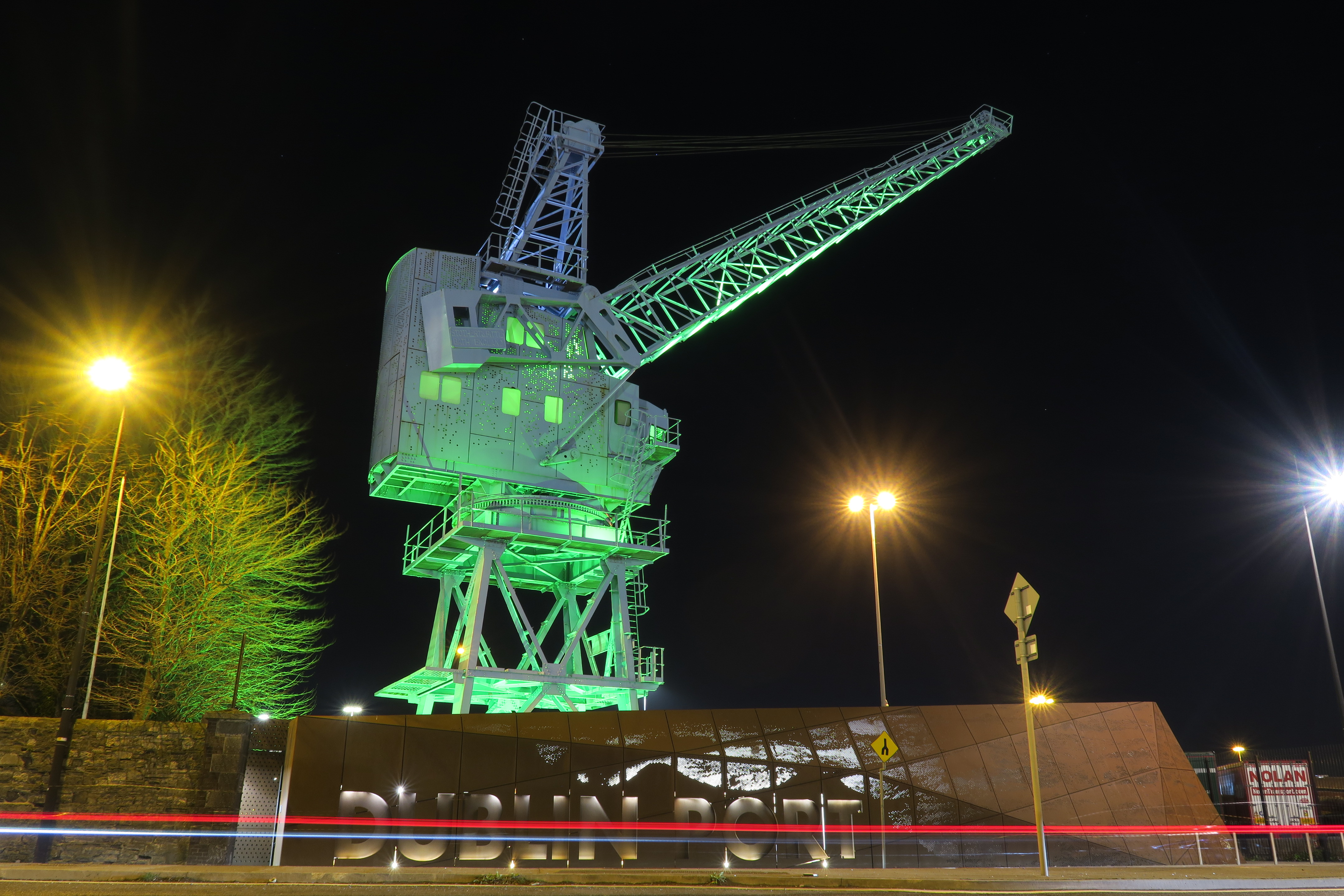
The Dublin Port Company headquarters all set to green for the Saint Patrick's weekend, 2023

Dublin Port Company (Irish: Comhlacht Chalafort Átha Cliath), formerly called the Dublin Port and Docks Board, is a self-financing semi-state company whose business is to manage Dublin Port, Ireland’s premier port. Established in 1997 as an independent company, Dublin Port Company is responsible for the management, control, operation and development of the port.
