= Great South Wall =

Sea wall at the Port of Dublin in Ireland

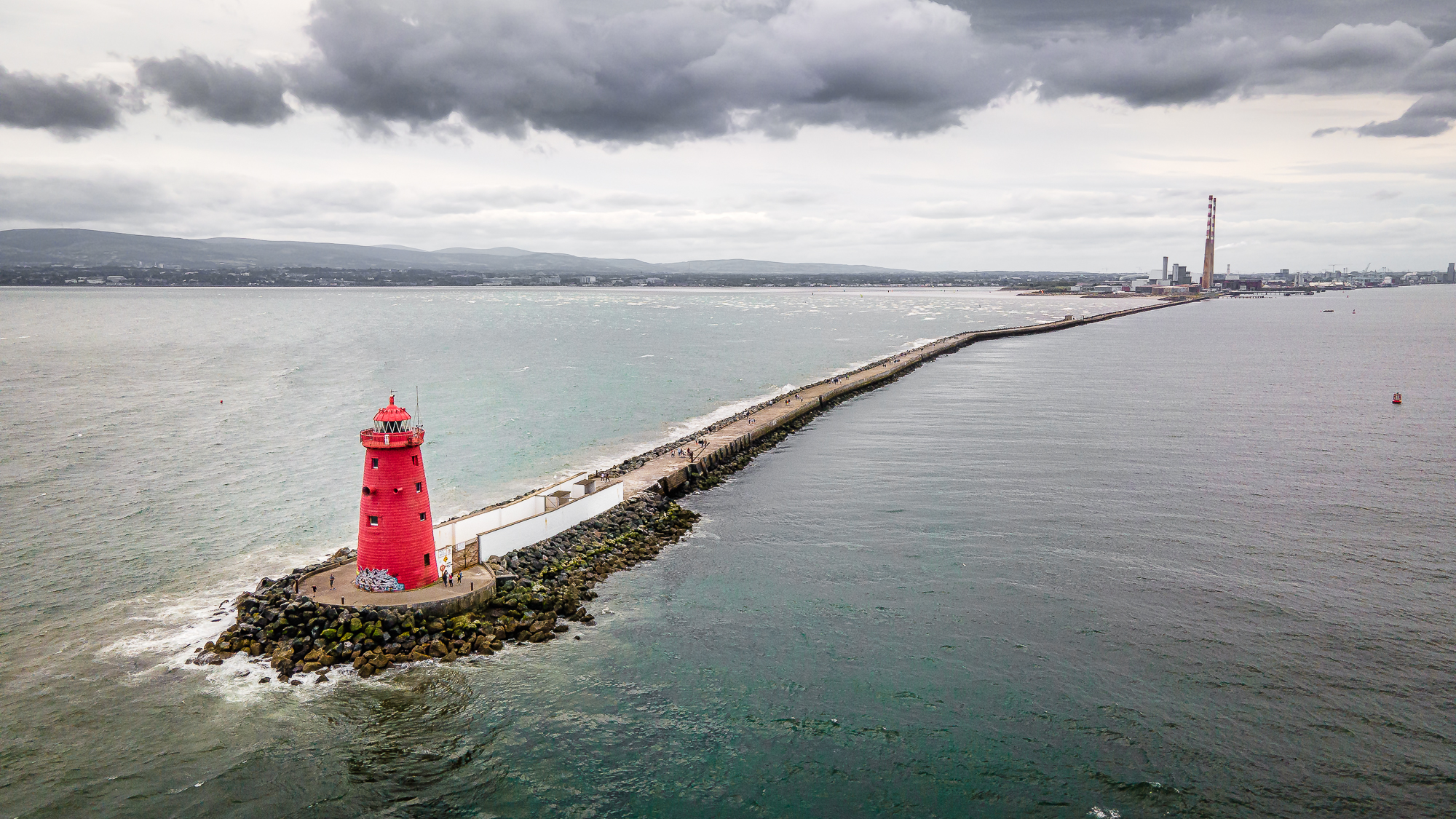
Poolbeg Lighthouse and the Great South Wall

The Great South Wall (Irish: Balla an Bhulla Theas) (also sometimes called the South Bull Wall) is a sea wall at the Port of Dublin, Ireland. It extends from the tip of the Poolbeg peninsula more than four kilometres out into Dublin Bay. It was the world's longest sea wall at the time of its construction in the 18th century and remains one of the longest in Europe. It faces the newer Bull Wall, and has one of four port lighthouses at its end.

== History ==
=== Background ===
Dublin Bay had a long-running problem with silting at the mouth of the River Liffey, and held major sand banks known as the North Bull and South Bull (both hard sand dry at low water), to either side of the Liffey mouth, along with the Kish Bank over 11 km out to sea. Between the North and South Bulls, a sand bar existed, rising over time, limiting access to the city quays.

Furthermore, the shape of the Liffey estuary was rather different from the present day, with the river channel not fully enclosed, much of Pearse Street (then Lazey Hill) running along the shore, which then bent sharply south, running in a diagonal to Irishtown, with Ringsend being a narrow sand spit projecting north into the bay.

=== To Ringsend ===
Reclamation of the lands between the city and Ringsend progressed during the 17th and early 18th century, accelerated by the foundation of the Ballast Office in 1707, and by the granting of an estate there to Sir John Rogerson in 1713. Rogerson paid for a massive quay, all the way to a new mouth for the River Dodder, adjacent to Ringsend.

=== Commencement ===
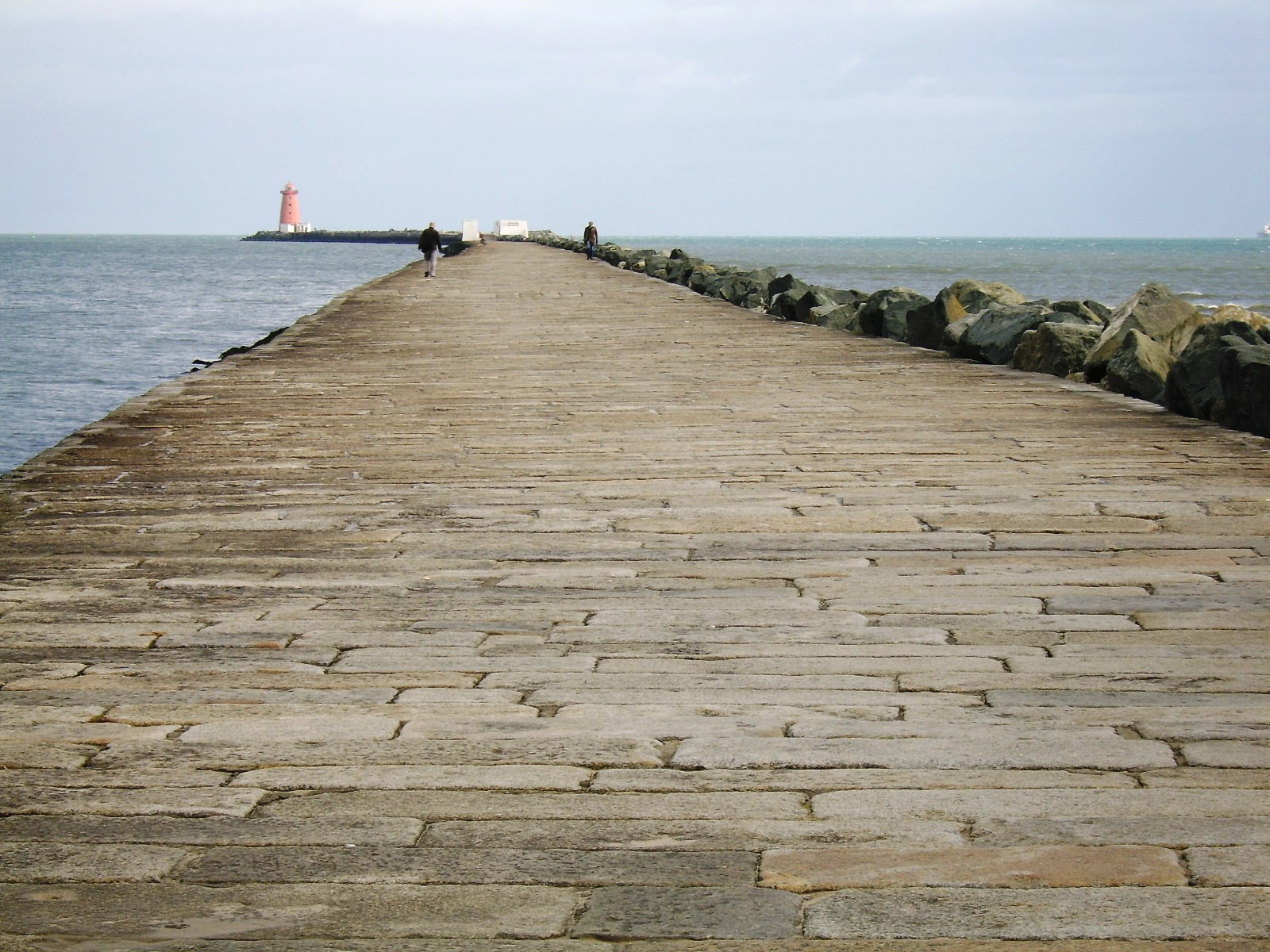
A look along the wall from near Poolbeg Power Station

Years of primitive dredging were succeeded by an attempt to maintain a clear main channel to Dublin more effectively when, in 1715, the Dublin City Assembly authorised the building of an embankment from Ringsend along the north aspect of the South Bull sandbank. The first piles of what was to become the South Bull Wall were driven that year, and major work commenced in 1717, with what was then known simply as The Piles completed in 1730 to 1731. Construction involved driving of oaken piles into the boulder clay of Dublin Bay, with these anchored by baskets of gravel, and woven wattles.

A stone wall linking The Piles to the quays, The Ballast Office Wall, was completed in 1756, and the first Pigeon House at the shoreward end of the piles was built around 1760 as a residence for a caretaker. Over a period, a bank of sand and other debris, the White Bank, developed adjacent to the wall about 800m seawards of the Pigeon House.

The driven-pile barrier was breached by storm action after reported rotting and tidal stress, and in 1761, a stone pier was commenced, working from the Poolbeg Lighthouse (commenced in 1761, operational 1767) back to shore. The construction, of massive granite blocks, brought from quarries at Dalkey, was completed in 1795. The final wall dimensions were 32 feet at the base, tapering to 28 feet at the top.

In the meantime, in 1791, the Pigeon House Harbour was planned, while in 1793, a gun battery, named the Half-Moon Battery for its shape, was built about 800m shorewards of the lighthouse. Also around 1793, a hotel, the Pigeon House Hotel was opened.

Following temporary military arrangements after the 1798 Rebellion, the Pigeon House Fort was created, maintained from 1814 to 1897. At its peak, it included gates with trenches crossed by drawbridges at the beginning of the wall, quarters for officers and men, a hospital, armoury, magazine and stores. In 1897, the complex was sold to Dublin Corporation for development to include the city’s first major electricity generating station and a sewage processing facility, as well as reuse of the hospital. This followed the installation, between 1878 and 1881, of a sewage pipe along the wall, discharging at the White Bank.

== Structure and access ==
Much of the wall is now encompassed by port facilities or lies within the Poolbeg Generating Station complex. Public access now generally begins with the part of the wall just beyond the power station, which has parking adjacent. The area is no longer served by public transport since changes to Dublin Bus routes in mid-May 2012 saw the limited service to Poolbeg Power Station discontinued. The last bus operated on the morning of Saturday 12 May 2012.

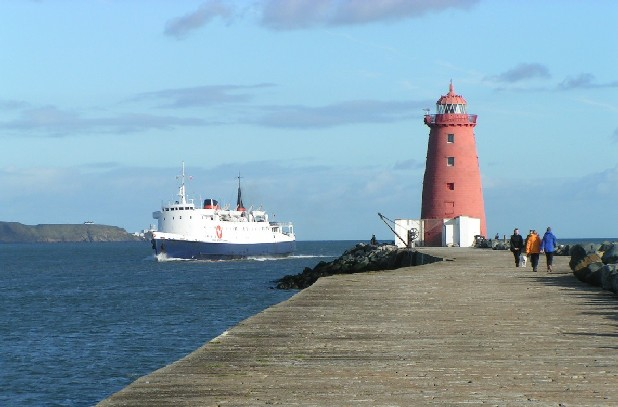
Isle of Man passenger ship, Lady of Mann, passes behind Poolbeg Lighthouse, 2004

At the seaward end of the wall stands the red-painted Poolbeg Lighthouse, standing in its current form since 1820, having replaced an earlier light tower, which in turn replaced a 1782 light-ship. The Ordnance Survey, and later Ordnance Survey Ireland, used the low water mark of the spring tide on 8 April 1837 at the lighthouse as the standard height datum for Ireland until 1958.

In February 2026, a 5km section of the Great South Wall closed for repair works on a section of rock armour damaged by Storm Bram which were estimated to cost €2.5 million. In 1995 rock armour had first been added to give the wall further protection against storms.

== External sources ==
- Ball, Francis Elrington: Dublin, Ireland: A History of the County Dublin, Vol. 2 (Parishes of Donnybrook)
- Joyce, Weston St. John: Dublin, Ireland, 1920: "The Neighbourhood of Dublin", Chapter II, "The Poolbeg Lighthouse and the South Wall Extension, etc."
