= List of lighthouses in Ireland =

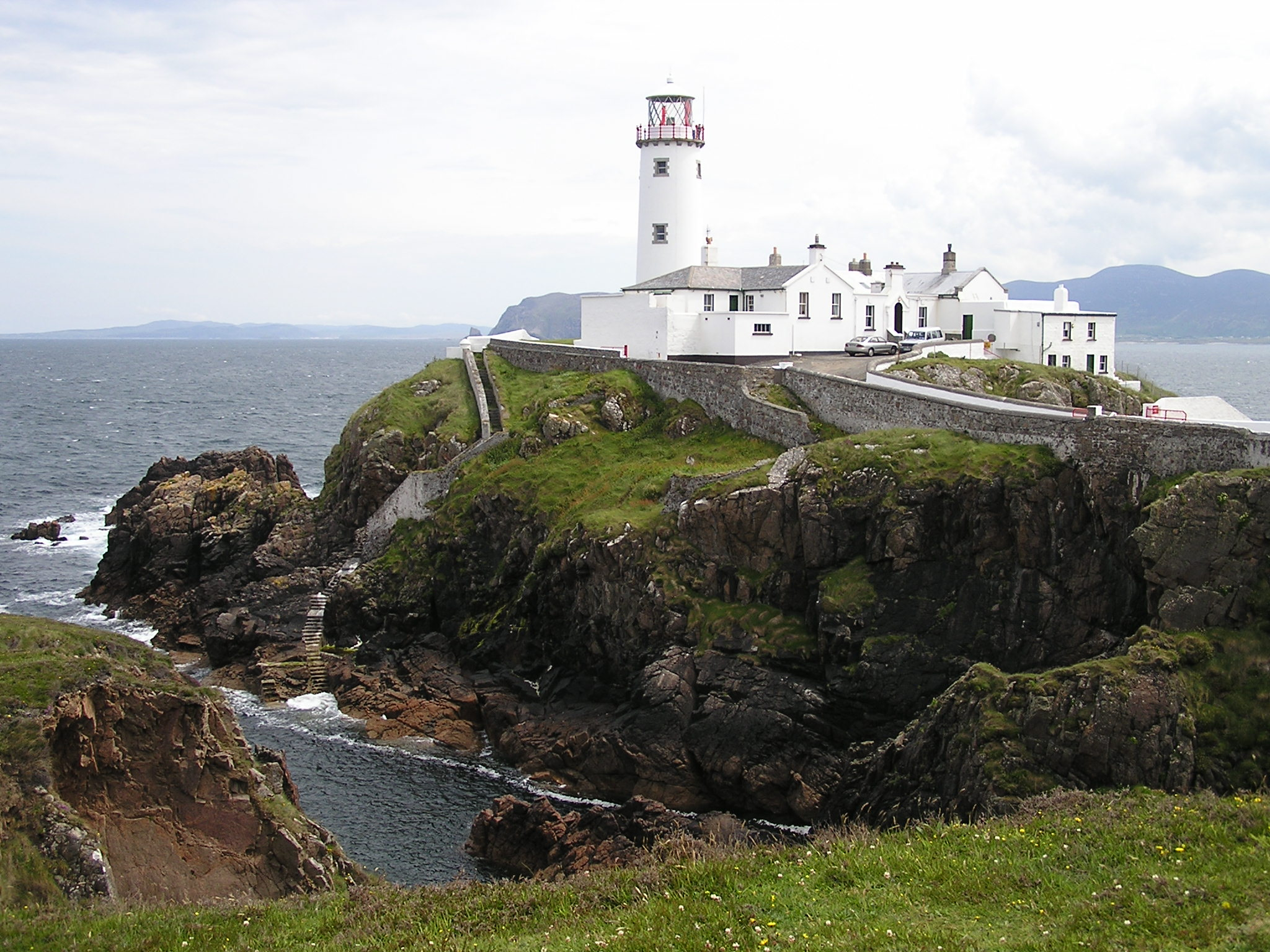
Fanad lighthouse

This is a list of lighthouses in Ireland. The Commissioners of Irish Lights are responsible for the majority of lighthouses around the country, though a small number are maintained by local harbour authorities. The main list identifies those lighthouses in a clockwise direction starting with Crookhaven lighthouse, County Cork.

== Maintained by Commissioners of Irish Lights ==
Name	Image	Location Coordinates	County	Water body	Year built	Tower height	Focal height	Range
Crookhaven Lighthouse		Crookhaven; 51.477°N 9.705°W	Cork	Celtic Sea	1843	14 m (46 ft)	20 m (66 ft)	13 nmi (24 km)
Mizen Head Lighthouse		Mizen Head; 51.45°N 9.82°W	Cork	Celtic Sea	1959	4 m (13 ft)	55 m (180 ft)	15 nmi (28 km)
Roancarrigmore Lighthouse		Roancarrigmore Island; 51.653°N 9.747°W	Cork	Bantry Bay	1847	7 m (23 ft)	18 m (59 ft)	11 nmi (20 km)
Castletownbere Light		Castletownbere; 51.647°N 9.905°W	Cork	Bantry Bay	1965	5 m (16 ft)	7 m (23 ft)	15 nmi (28 km)
Ardnakinna Lighthouse		Bere Island; 51.618°N 9.918°W	Cork	Bantry Bay	1850/1965	20 m (66 ft)	62 m (203 ft)	17 nmi (31 km)
Sheep's Head Lighthouse		Sheep's Head; 51.543°N 9.849°W	Cork	Bantry Bay	1968	7 m (23 ft)	83 m (272 ft)	18 nmi (33 km)
Bull Rock Lighthouse		Bull Rock; 51.592°N 10.301°W	Cork	North Atlantic	1889	15 m (49 ft)	91 m (299 ft)	18 nmi (33 km)
Skelligs Lighthouse		Skellig Michael; 51.768°N 10.542°W	Kerry	North Atlantic	1826/1967	12 m (39 ft)	53 m (174 ft)	12 nmi (22 km)
Valentia Light		Valentia Island; 51.925°N 10.307°W	Kerry	North Atlantic	1913	6 m (20 ft)	25 m (82 ft)	11 nmi (20 km)
Cromwell Point Lighthouse		Valentia Island; 51.934°N 10.321°W	Kerry	North Atlantic	1841	15 m (49 ft)	16 m (52 ft)	17 nmi (31 km)
Inishtearaght Lighthouse		Tearaght Island; 52.076°N 10.661°W	Kerry	North Atlantic	1870	17 m (56 ft)	84 m (276 ft)	19 nmi (35 km)
Little Samphire Island Lighthouse		Fenit; 52.271°N 9.882°W	Kerry	Tralee Bay	1854	12 m (39 ft)	17 m (56 ft)	14 nmi (26 km)
Inis Cathaig Lighthouse		Scattery Island; 52.606°N 9.518°W	Clare	Shannon	1872	12 m (39 ft)	15 m (49 ft)	10 nmi (19 km)
Corlis Point rear (Querrin Quay) leading light	CorlisPointLeadingLight	Carrigaholt; 52.628°N 9.589°W	Clare	Shannon	1998	25 m (82 ft)	27 m (89 ft)	10 nmi (19 km)
Corlis Point front leading light		Carrigaholt; 52.618°N 9.606°W	Clare	Shannon	1998	4 m (13 ft)	9 m (30 ft)	10 nmi (19 km)
Loop Head		Loop Head; 52.561°N 9.932°W	Clare	North Atlantic	1854	23 m (75 ft)	84 m (276 ft)	23 nmi (43 km)
Inisheer Lighthouse		Inisheer; 53.047°N 9.527°W	Galway	North Atlantic	1857	34 m (112 ft)	34 m (112 ft)	20 nmi (37 km)
Black Head Lighthouse, County Clare		Fanore; 53.154°N 9.264°W	Clare	Galway Bay	1936	8 m (26 ft)	20 m (66 ft)	11 nmi (20 km)
Cashla Bay Lighthouse		Casla; 53.264°N 9.566°W	Galway	Galway Bay	1984	4 m (13 ft)	6 m (20 ft)	8 nmi (15 km)
Straw Island Lighthouse		Aran Islands; 53.118°N 9.631°W	Galway	North Atlantic	1878	11 m (36 ft)	11 m (36 ft)	15 nmi (28 km)
Eeragh Lighthouse		Aran Islands; 53.148°N 9.857°W	Galway	North Atlantic	1857	31 m (102 ft)	35 m (115 ft)	18 nmi (33 km)
Slyne Head Lighthouse		Slyne Head lighthouse 53.4°N 10.234°W	Galway	North Atlantic	1836	24 m (79 ft)	35 m (115 ft)	19 nmi (35 km)
Inishgort Lighthouse		Clew Bay; 53.827°N 9.671°W	Mayo	Clew Bay	1827	8 m (26 ft)	11 m (36 ft)	10 nmi (19 km)
Achillbeg Lighthouse		Achillbeg; 53.858°N 9.947°W	Mayo	Clew Bay	1965	9 m (30 ft)	56 m (184 ft)	18 nmi (33 km)
Blacksod Lighthouse		Blacksod Bay; 54.099°N 10.06°W	Mayo	North Atlantic	1864	12 m (39 ft)	13 m (43 ft)	12 nmi (22 km)
Blackrock Mayo Lighthouse		Blacksod Bay; 54.068°N 10.321°W	Mayo	North Atlantic	1864	15 m (49 ft)	86 m (282 ft)	20 nmi (37 km)
Eagle Island lighthouse		Eagle Island; 54.284°N 10.093°W	Mayo	North Atlantic	1835	11 m (36 ft)	67 m (220 ft)	18 nmi (33 km)
Broadhaven Lighthouse		Broadhaven Bay; 54.268°N 9.889°W	Mayo	North Atlantic	1848	15 m (49 ft)	27 m (89 ft)	17 nmi (31 km)
Oyster Island Lighthouse		Rosses Point; 54.302°N 8.571°W	Sligo	Sligo Bay	1837/1893	12 m (39 ft)	13 m (43 ft)	7 nmi (13 km)
Metal Man Sligo Lighthouse		Rosses Point; 54.304°N 8.576°W	Sligo	Sligo Bay	1821	5 m (16 ft)	3 m (10 ft)	7 nmi (13 km)
Lower Rosses Lighthouse		Rosses Point; 54.329°N 8.573°W	Sligo	Sligo Bay	1908	8 m (26 ft)	8 m (26 ft)	13 nmi (24 km)
Blackrock Sligo Lighthouse		Sligo Bay; 54.308°N 8.618°W	Sligo	Sligo Bay	1835	25 m (82 ft)	24 m (79 ft)	10 nmi (19 km)
Rotten Island lighthouse		Rotten Island; 54.615°N 8.441°W	Donegal	Donegal Bay	1838	14 m (46 ft)	20 m (66 ft)	15 nmi (28 km)
St John's Point Lighthouse, County Donegal		Dunkineely; 54.569°N 8.461°W	Donegal	Donegal Bay	1831	14 m (46 ft)	30 m (98 ft)	14 nmi (26 km)
Rathlin O'Birne Lighthouse		Glencolmcille; 54.664°N 8.833°W	Donegal	North Atlantic	1856	20 m (66 ft)	35 m (115 ft)	12 nmi (22 km)
Ballagh Rocks Lighthouse		Arranmore; 54.999°N 8.481°W	Donegal	North Atlantic	1982	10 m (33 ft)	13 m (43 ft)	5 nmi (9 km)
Arranmore Lighthouse		Arranmore; 55.015°N 8.561°W	Donegal	North Atlantic	1798/1865	23 m (75 ft)	71 m (233 ft)	27 nmi (50 km)
Tory Island Lighthouse		Tory Island; 55.273°N 8.249°W	Donegal	North Atlantic	1832	27 m (89 ft)	40 m (131 ft)	18 nmi (33 km)
Buncrana Light		Buncrana; 55.127°N 7.465°W	Donegal	Lough Swilly	1876/2009	6 m (20 ft)	11 m (36 ft)	13 nmi (24 km)
Dunree Lighthouse		Dunree; 55.198°N 7.554°W	Donegal	Lough Swilly	1876	6 m (20 ft)	46 m (151 ft)	12 nmi (22 km)
Fanad Head Lighthouse		Fanad; 55.276°N 7.632°W	Donegal	North Atlantic	1817/1886	22 m (72 ft)	39 m (128 ft)	18 nmi (33 km)
Inishtrahull Lighthouse		Inishtrahull Island; 55.431°N 7.244°W	Donegal	North Atlantic	1812/1958	23 m (75 ft)	59 m (194 ft)	19 nmi (35 km)
Inishowen Lighthouse		Inishowen; 55.226°N 6.929°W	Donegal	North Atlantic	1837	23 m (75 ft)	29 m (95 ft)	18 nmi (33 km)
Rathlin West Lighthouse		Rathlin Island; 55.301°N 6.281°W	Antrim	North Channel	1917	18 m (59 ft)	62 m (203 ft)	22 nmi (41 km)
Rathlin East (Altacarry Head) Lighthouse		Rathlin Island; 55.302°N 6.172°W	Antrim	North Channel	1856	27 m (89 ft)	74 m (243 ft)	26 nmi (48 km)
Rue Point Lighthouse		Rathlin Island; 55.259°N 6.191°W	Antrim	North Channel	1915/1921	11 m (36 ft)	16 m (52 ft)	14 nmi (26 km)
Maidens Lighthouse		The Maidens; 54.929°N 5.728°W	Antrim	North Channel	1829	23 m (75 ft)	29 m (95 ft)	23 nmi (43 km)
Blackhead Lighthouse, County Antrim		Whitehead; 54.767°N 5.689°W	Antrim	North Channel	1902	16 m (52 ft)	45 m (148 ft)	27 nmi (50 km)
Mew Island Lighthouse		Mew Island; 54.699°N 5.514°W	Down	North Channel	1884	37 m (121 ft)	37 m (121 ft)	24 nmi (44 km)
Donaghadee Lighthouse		Donaghadee; 54.645°N 5.531°W	Down	North Channel	1836	16 m (52 ft)	17 m (56 ft)	17 nmi (31 km)
Angus Rock Lighthouse		Strangford Lough; 54.331°N 5.525°W	Down	Strangford Lough	1983	13 m (43 ft)	15 m (49 ft)	5 nmi (9 km)
St John's Point Lighthouse, County Down		Killough; 54.227°N 5.66°W	Down	Irish Sea	1844/1893	39 m (128 ft)	37 m (121 ft)	25 nmi (46 km)
Green Island Leading Light		Carlingford Lough; 54.033°N 6.096°W	Down	Carlingford Lough	1873	14 m (46 ft)	13 m (43 ft)	11 nmi (20 km)
Vidal Bank Leading Light		Carlingford Lough; 54.03°N 6.091°W	Down	Carlingford Lough	1873	8 m (26 ft)	7 m (23 ft)	11 nmi (20 km)
Haulbowline Lighthouse		Carlingford Lough; 54.02°N 6.079°W	Down	Irish Sea	1824	34 m (112 ft)	32 m (105 ft)	10 nmi (19 km)
Dundalk Lighthouse		Dundalk; 53.976°N 6.295°W	Louth	Irish Sea	1855	10 m (33 ft)	10 m (33 ft)	10 nmi (19 km)
Rockabill Lighthouse		Rockabill; 53.597°N 6.005°W	Dublin	Irish Sea	1860	32 m (105 ft)	45 m (148 ft)	18 nmi (33 km)
Baily Lighthouse		Howth Head; 53.362°N 6.053°W	Dublin	Dublin Bay	1814	13 m (43 ft)	41 m (135 ft)	18 nmi (33 km)
Dún Laoghaire West Lighthouse		Dún Laoghaire; 53.303°N 6.131°W	Dublin	Dublin Bay	1852	9 m (30 ft)	11 m (36 ft)	7 nmi (13 km)
Dún Laoghaire East Lighthouse		Dún Laoghaire; 53.303°N 6.127°W	Dublin	Dublin Bay	1847	12 m (39 ft)	16 m (52 ft)	17 nmi (31 km)
Muglins Lighthouse		Dalkey Island; 53.275°N 6.076°W	Dublin	Dublin Bay	1906	9 m (30 ft)	14 m (46 ft)	11 nmi (20 km)
Kish Lighthouse		Kish Bank; 53.311°N 5.926°W	Dublin	Dublin Bay	1965	31 m (102 ft)	29 m (95 ft)	22 nmi (41 km)
Wicklow Head Lighthouse		Wicklow Head; 52.966°N 5.998°W	Wicklow	St George's Channel	1781/1818	14 m (46 ft)	37 m (121 ft)	23 nmi (43 km)
Tuskar Rock Lighthouse		Tuskar Rock; 52.203°N 6.207°W	Wexford	St George's Channel	1815	34 m (112 ft)	33 m (108 ft)	24 nmi (44 km)
Dunmore East Lighthouse		Dunmore East; 52.149°N 6.99°W	Waterford	Celtic Sea	1825	16 m (52 ft)	13 m (43 ft)	17 nmi (31 km)
Hook Lighthouse		Hook Head; 52.124°N 6.93°W	Wexford	Celtic Sea	1172	35 m (115 ft)	46 m (151 ft)	23 nmi (43 km)
Ballinacourty Point Lighthouse		Dungarvan; 52.078°N 7.553°W	Waterford	Celtic Sea	1858	13 m (43 ft)	16 m (52 ft)	10 nmi (19 km)
Mine Head Lighthouse		Mine Head; 51.993°N 7.587°W	Waterford	Celtic Sea	1851	21 m (69 ft)	87 m (285 ft)	12 nmi (22 km)
Ballycotton lighthouse		Ballycotton; 51.825°N 7.986°W	Cork	Celtic Sea	1851	15 m (49 ft)	59 m (194 ft)	21 nmi (39 km)
Roche's Point Lighthouse		Cork Harbour; 51.793°N 8.255°W	Cork	Cork Harbour	1817/1835	15 m (49 ft)	30 m (98 ft)	20 nmi (37 km)
Charlesfort Lighthouse		Charlesfort; 51.696°N 8.5°W	Cork	Kinsale Harbour	Unknown	5 m (16 ft)	18 m (59 ft)	9 nmi (17 km)
Old Head of Kinsale Lighthouse		Old Head of Kinsale; 51.605°N 8.534°W	Cork	Celtic Sea	1665/1853	30 m (98 ft)	72 m (236 ft)	20 nmi (37 km)
Galley Head Lighthouse		Galley Head; 51.53°N 8.954°W	Cork	Celtic Sea	1878	21 m (69 ft)	53 m (174 ft)	23 nmi (43 km)
Copper Point Lighthouse		Long Island; 51.504°N 9.534°W	Cork	Celtic Sea	1864	15 m (49 ft)	16 m (52 ft)	8 nmi (15 km)
Fastnet Lighthouse		Fastnet Rock; 51.389°N 9.603°W	Cork	Celtic Sea	1854/1904	54 m (177 ft)	49 m (161 ft)	27 nmi (50 km)

== Maintained by other Irish marine authorities ==
A smaller number of active lighthouses are operated by other authorities, primarily the port and harbour companies located around the Irish coast.

Name	Image	Location Coordinates	County	Waterbody	Built	Tower Height	Focal Height	Operated by
Aleria		Drogheda; 53.7225°N 6.2388°W	Louth	Irish Sea	1936	10 m (33 ft)	11 m (36 ft)	Drogheda Port Company
Ardglass Pier		Ardglass; 54.2610°N 5.6027°W	Down	Ardglass Harbour	1885	9.5 m (31 ft)	10 m (33 ft)	Northern Ireland Fishery Harbour Authority
Balbriggan		Balbriggan; 53.6129°N 6.1787°W	Fingal	Irish Sea	1769	11 m (36 ft)	12 m (39 ft)	Dublin Port Company
Ballynagard		River Foyle; 55.0380°N 7.2736°W	Londonderry	River Foyle	Unknown	7 m (23 ft)	6 m (20 ft)	Londonderry Port
Barrack Point		Sherkin Island; 51.4728°N 9.3947°W	Cork	Baltimore Harbour	1885	8 m (26 ft)	40 m (131 ft)	Cork County Council
Beeves Rock		Shannon Estuary; 52.6502°N 9.0225°W	Clare	Shannon Estuary	1855	18 m (59 ft)	12 m (39 ft)	Shannon Foynes Port Company
Chaine Memorial		Larne; 54.855°N 5.798°W	Antrim	North Channel	1899	23 m (75 ft)	23 m (75 ft)	Larne Harbour
Dingle Harbour		Dingle; 52.1216°N 10.2582°W	Kerry	Dingle Harbour	1885	7 m (23 ft)	20 m (66 ft)	Dingle Fishery Harbour Centre
Duncannon Fort		Duncannon Fort; 52.2205°N 6.9374°W	Wexford	Waterford Harbour	Unknown	7.5 m (25 ft)	13 m (43 ft)	Port of Waterford Company
Duncannon North		Duncannon; 52.2292°N 6.9369°W	Wexford	Waterford Harbour	1838	10.5 m (34 ft)	39 m (128 ft)	Port of Waterford Company
Galway Harbour (The Leverets)		Galway Harbour; 53.2554°N 9.0319°W	Galway	Galway Bay	1977	9 m (30 ft)	9 m (30 ft)	Galway Harbour Company
Howth Harbour		Howth; 53.3941°N 6.0669°W	Fingal	Irish Sea	1982	10 m (33 ft)	13 m (43 ft)	Dublin Port Company
Moville		Moville; 55.1831°N 7.0354°W	Donegal	Lough Foyle	1882	13.5 m (44 ft)	11 m (36 ft)	Londonderry Port
North Bank		Dublin Port; 53.3448°N 6.1765°W	Dublin	River Liffey	1882	11 m (36 ft)	10 m (33 ft)	Dublin Port Company
North Bull		North Bull Island; 53.3449°N 6.1497°W	Dublin	Dublin Bay	1880	15 m (49 ft)	15 m (49 ft)	Dublin Port Company
North Wall Quay		Dublin Port; 53.3457°N 6.2165°W	Dublin	River Liffey	1904	12 m (39 ft)	12 m (39 ft)	Dublin Port Company
Poolbeg		Poolbeg; 53.3421°N 6.1517°W	Dublin	Dublin Bay	1820	20 m (66 ft)	20 m (66 ft)	Dublin Port Company
Rosslare Harbour		Rosslare Europort; 52.2571°N 6.3381°W	Wexford	St Georges Channel	1906	7.5 m (25 ft)	15 m (49 ft)	Rosslare Europort
Spillane's Tower		Limerick; 52.6558°N 8.6615°W	Limerick	River Shannon	1885	11 m (36 ft)	11 m (36 ft)	Shannon Foynes Port Company
Spit Bank		Cobh; 51.8453°N 8.2739°W	Cork	Cork Harbour	1853	10.5 m (34 ft)	10 m (33 ft)	Port of Cork Company
Tarbert Island		Tarbet; 52.5920°N 9.3636°W	Kerry	River Shannon	1834	22.5 m (74 ft)	18 m (59 ft)	Shannon Foynes Port Company
Warren Point		Greencastle; 55.2097°N 6.9519°W	Donegal	Lough Foyle	1861	8 m (26 ft)	9 m (30 ft)	Londonderry Port
Wicklow East Pier		Wicklow; 52.9832°N 6.0344°W	Wicklow	Irish Sea	1884	7 m (23 ft)	11 m (36 ft)	Wicklow Port Company
Youghal Lighthouse		Youghal; 51.943°N 7.842°W	Cork	Celtic Sea	1852	15 m (49 ft)	24 m (79 ft)	Cork County Council

== Inactive ==
Improvements and changes to the aids to navigation around the Irish coast, has meant that there are a number of lighthouses that have been decommissioned. This list includes those where the tower or structure is still in existence. Some of these have been reused, such as Ferris Point which is now a vessel control tower. Clare Island was turned into a guest house and the optic is on permanent rotating display at the World of Glass museum and visitor centre in North West England. The older Wicklow Head tower was refurbished by the Irish Landmark Trust as a holiday let.

Name	Image	Location Coordinates	County	Waterbody	Built	Inactive since	Notes
Ballycurrin		Headford; 53.4851°N 9.2130°W	Mayo	Lough Corrib	1847	Unknown	Unusual lakeshore light with external staircase.
Blackrock Castle		Cork; 51.9000°N 8.4025°W	Cork	Cork Harbour	1582	1903	A light was shown from a window in the highest tower.
Calf Rock		Dursey Island; 51.5850°N 10.2763°W	Cork	North Atlantic	1866	1881	The tower was badly damaged by a storm in 1881.
Cape Clear		Cape Clear Island; 51.4345°N 9.4846°W	Cork	Celtic Sea	1818	1854	Deactivated after the original Fastnet lighthouse was completed.
Clare Island		Clare Island; 53.8275°N 9.9834°W	Mayo	Clew Bay	1818	1965	Refurbished as a guest house.
Culmore Point		Culmore; 55.0464°N 7.2541°W	Londonderry	River Foyle	1920s	2012	White and green tower next to Culmore Fort. Replaced by a post light.
Drogheda East		Mornington; 53.7192°N 6.2476°W	Meath	River Boyne	1880s	2007	One of three lights constructed to aid navigation along the Boyne and into the harbour at Drogheda.
Drogheda North		Mornington; 53.7241°N 6.2544°W	Meath	River Boyne	1880s	2000	One of three lights constructed to aid navigation along the Boyne and into the harbour at Drogheda.
Drogheda West		Mornington; 53.7189°N 6.2489°W	Meath	River Boyne	1880s	2000	One of three lights constructed to aid navigation along the Boyne and into the harbour at Drogheda.
Ferris Point		Larne; 54.8514°N 5.7900°W	Antrim	Larne Lough	Unknown	1994	Now houses the control room for the Port of Larne.
Greenore		Greenore; 54.0337°N 6.1322°W	Louth	Carlingford Lough	1830	1986	Located on Carlingford Lough next to Greenore Port.
Howth Harbour		Howth; 53.3933°N 6.0668°W	Fingal	Irish Sea	1818	1982	Replaced by modern light nearby.
Inishmore		Inishmore; 53.1274°N 9.7022°W	Galway	Galway Bay	1818	1857	The first lighthouse in the Aran Islands, built on the highest point of Inishmore.
Inishowen East		Inishowen; 55.2266°N 6.9271°W	Donegal	North Channel	1837	1961	Squat tower separate from the active West Inishowen Lighthouse.
Kilcredaun Head		Carrigaholt; 52.5798°N 9.7097°W	Clare	Shannon Estuary	1824	2011	Positioned on a headland on the northern shore of the estuary.
Mutton Island		Mutton Island; 53.2541°N 9.0535°W	Galway	Galway Bay	1817	1977	Replaced by the Galway Harbour lighthouse. Restored between 2005 and 2011.
Skelling Michael (High)		Skelling Michael; 51.7702°N 10.5438°W	Kerry	North Atlantic	1826	1870	Built on a high ledge on the western flank of Skelling Michael.
South Rock (Kilwarlin)		Kearney; 54.4030°N 5.3833°W	Down	North Channel	1797	1877	Considered to be the "oldest surviving waveswept lighthouse in Ireland".
West Maidens		The Maidens; 54.9957°N 5.7136°W	Antrim	North Channel	1829	1903	Built at the same time as the East Maidens light.
Wicklow Head High (1781)		Wicklow Head; 52.9652°N 6.0025°W	Wicklow	St George's Channel	1781	1818	Octagonal tower, renovated as a holiday let by the Irish Landmark Trust in 1996.
Wicklow Head High (1818)		Wicklow Head; 52.9655°N 6.0005°W	Wicklow	St George's Channel	1818	1865	Round tower, built to complement the currently active low level light.

== Other ==
- Baltimore Beacon, Baltimore, County Cork 51.472883°N 9.387646°W

== See also ==
- Lightvessel
- Lists of lighthouses
- List of islands of Ireland
- List of RNLI stations
