= Mine Head Lighthouse =

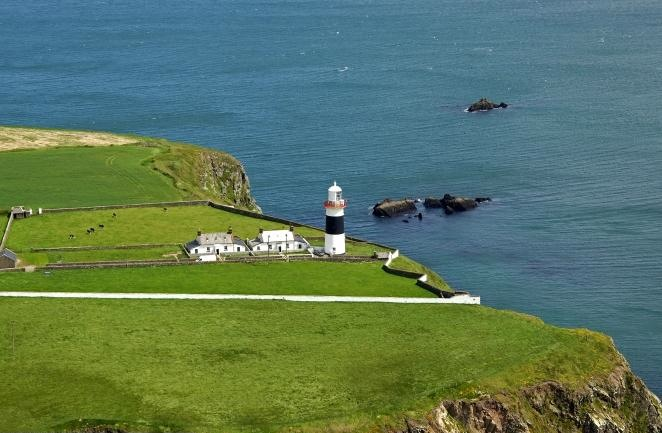
- Location: County Waterford, Ireland
- Coordinates: 51°59′34.4″N 7°35′11.1″W

Tower
- Constructed: 1851
- Construction: sandstone tower
- Automated: 1973
- Height: 22 metres (72 ft)
- Shape: cylindrical tower with balcony and lantern
- Markings: white tower with a black band
- Operator: Commissioners of Irish Lights

Light
- Focal height: 87 metres (285 ft)
- Range: 12 nautical miles (22 km; 14 mi)
- Characteristic: Fl (4) W 30s.
- Ireland no.: CIL-0340

Mine Head Lighthouse is an excellently preserved operational 19th-century lighthouse in Old Parish, County Waterford, Ireland.

George Halpin Senior designed the major light of Mine Head lighthouse. Constructed of red sandstone, the structure stands on top of the steep cliffs above the Celtic Sea.

== History ==
The lighthouse was built in 1851 and has a 22 m (72 ft.) white tower with a black band. It was converted to electricity in September 1964. The beacon flashes white and red every 2.5 sec. and has a range of 52 km (28 nautical miles). A new light with a decreased range of 22.224 km (12 nautical miles) was installed in 2012.

== See also ==
- List of lighthouses in Ireland
