= Howth Harbour Lighthouse =

Historic lighthouse at Howth Harbour, Ireland

Howth Harbour lighthouse
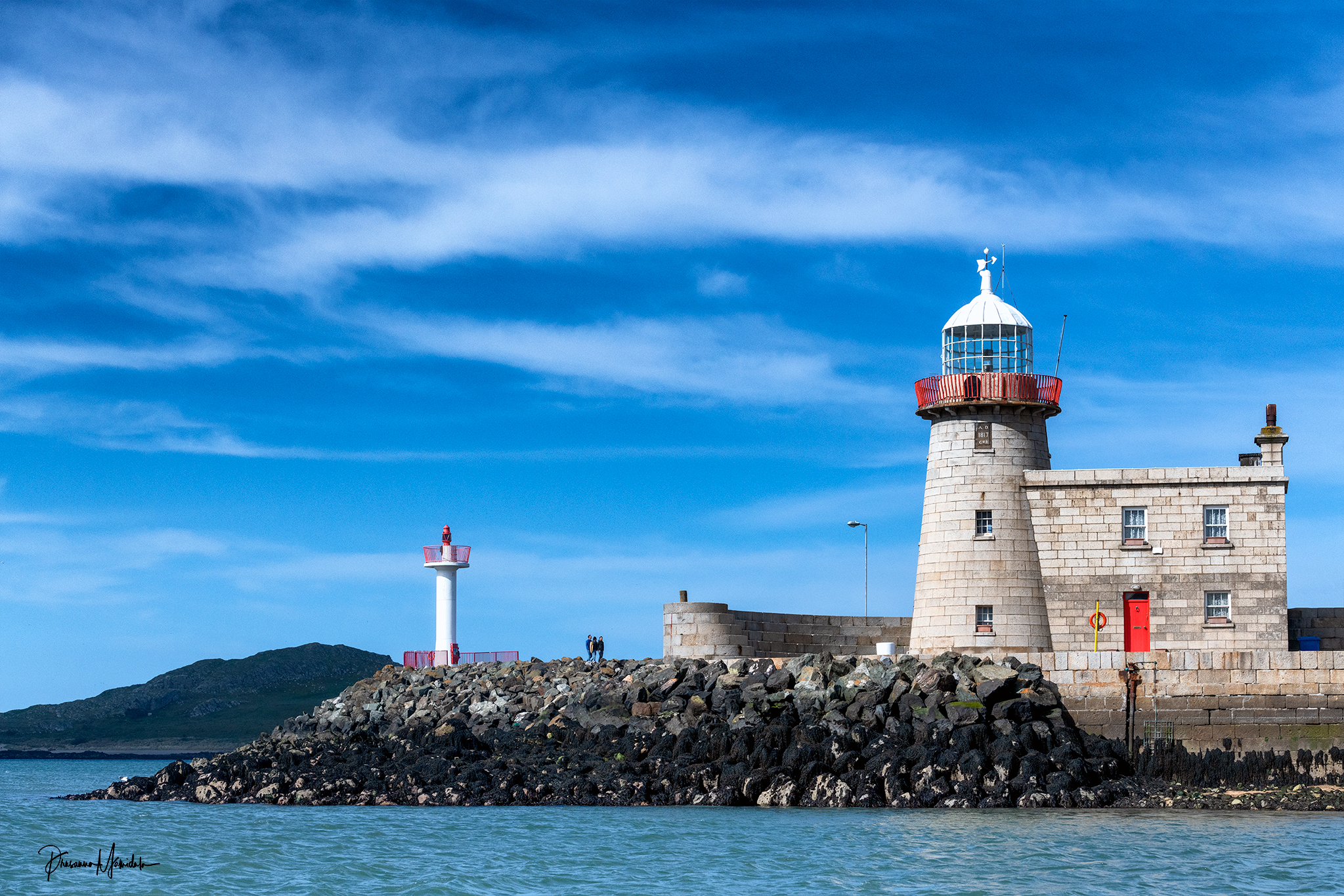
- View of lighthouse with new light behind it
- Location: Fingal, Ireland
- Coordinates: 53.39323°N 6.06672°W

Tower
- Constructed: 1817

Light
- First lit: 1818
- Deactivated: 1982

The Harbour lighthouse in Howth is a historic aid to navigation situated on the East pier of the harbour. It was built in the early 19th century to help guide shipping into the newly constructed harbour, which acted as the terminus for the packet service between Ireland and England. In 1982 it was decommissioned and replaced by a modern pole light on an adjacent extension of the pier.

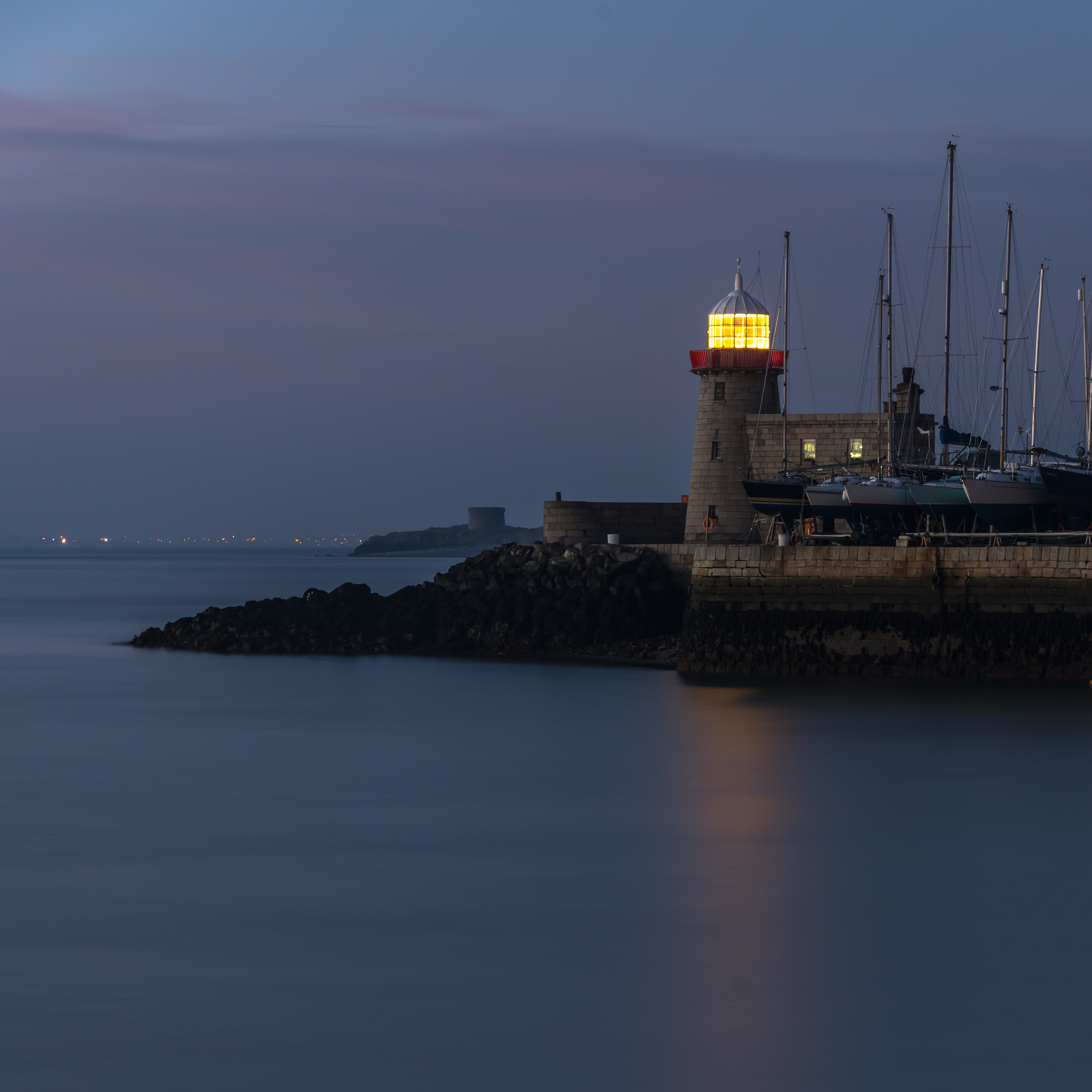
Old Howth Harbour Lighthouse lit at night

== History ==
Ongoing delays in getting packet boats unloaded at the Pigeon House at the mouth of the Liffey, near Ringsend, meant that an alternative harbour was deemed necessary. Howth was seen as a suitable location, the other option being Dún Laoghaire.

In 1807 work started on building the east pier at Howth to a design by a Captain Taylor, but when a large section of the pier gave way, the works were taken over by John Rennie the Elder. A second pier was constructed on the advice of Rennie, and the harbour was mostly finished by 1813. The piers were built with stone from the nearby quarry at Kilrock and granite which was shipped in by boat from Dalkey Quarry. But, "It was not formally established as the mail packet station until 1818, when a lighthouse was added to the end of the east pier."

Although the lighthouse was designed by Rennie, the commissioning of the light was undertaken by George Halpin who was the Inspector of Lighthouses for the Dublin Ballast Board. Halpin complained in June 1818 that the lighthouse was "neither ready for a lightkeeper nor suitably constructed for lighting the harbour." Changes were made, and it was first lit on 1 July, with "twelve Argand lamps with red lamp glasses and silvered copper catoptric reflectors".

Due to problems with siltation the use of the harbour for the mail packets was short lived, and instead another harbour was constructed at Dún Laoghaire, also designed by Rennie. This became the packet station in 1826. This shift in the importance of Howth harbour meant that questions were asked in 1836 about the ongoing need for the lighthouse. But the necessity for the light was justified by Halpin due to the use of the harbour for sheltering ships in bad weather.

The oil lamps were replaced with a 250 Watt bulb in 1955, when electricity was installed and the keepers were withdrawn.

The lighthouse is recorded as being of national importance within the National Inventory of Architectural Heritage. Completed in early 1818 (Note: Although the plaque on the tower is dated 1817) with the adjacent lighthouse keeper's house being added in 1821; initially this was single storey, but an additional storey was added in 1856.

The Holyhead Mail Pier Lighthouse also designed by Rennie is a matching tower in Holyhead it was built in 1821 at the other terminus of the Irish packet ships.

== Replacement light ==
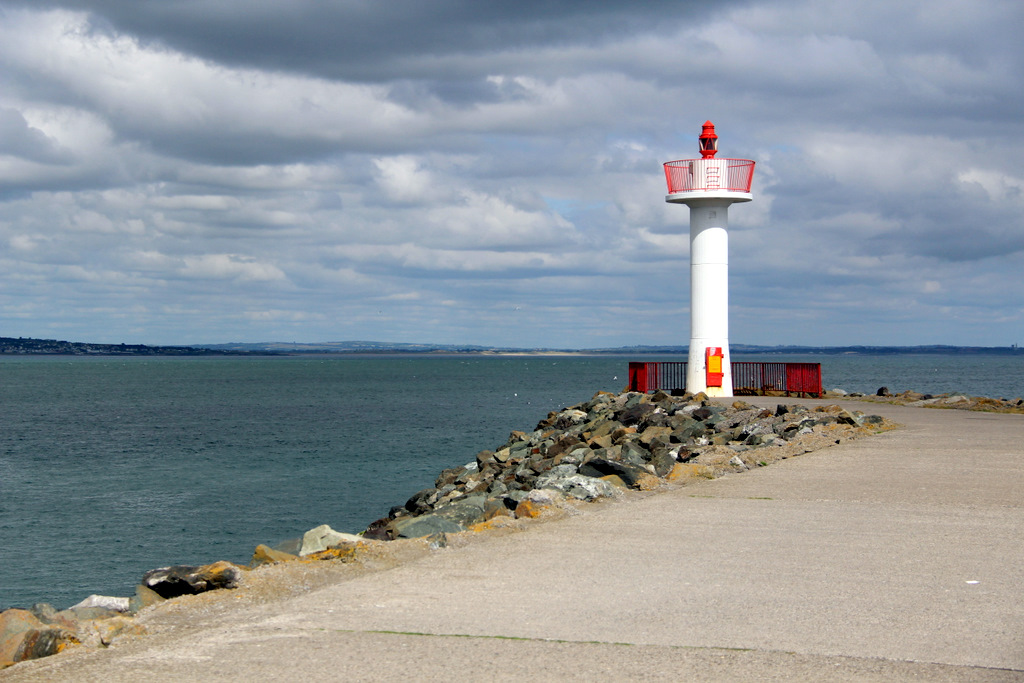
The modern light in 2011

A white pole was set up on the last section of the pier, beyond the lighthouse, taking over light provision from 19 May 1982. It had a glass drum lens in a buoy lantern, and after modernisation in 2010, it operates with six halogen lamps, on a mains electric supply and battery. The white beams have a range of 12 nautical miles, and the red 8 nautical miles.

== See also ==
- List of lighthouses in Ireland
