= The Maidens lighthouses =

East Maidens Lighthouse
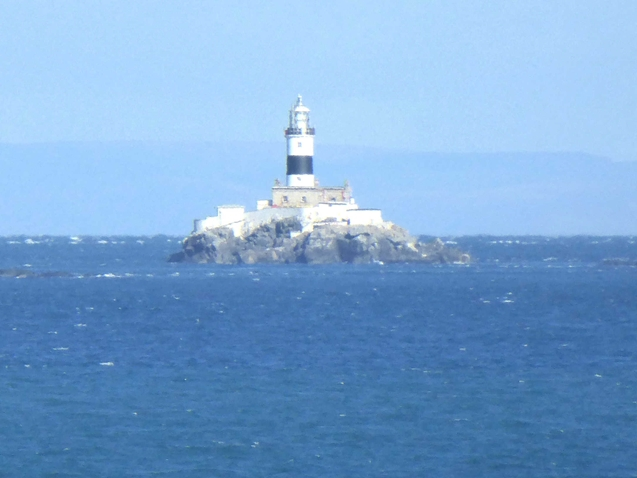
- East Maidens in 2018
- Location: North Channel; County Antrim; Northern Ireland
- Coordinates: 54°55′44.88″N 5°43′40.14″W

Tower
- Constructed: 1829
- Construction: stone tower
- Automated: 1977
- Height: 76 feet (23 m)
- Shape: cylindrical tower with balcony and lantern attached to a 2-storey keeper's house
- Markings: white tower with a black band, white lantern
- Operator: Commissioners of Irish Lights
- Racon: M

Light
- Focal height: 95 feet (29 m)
- Range: 23 nautical miles (43 km; 26 mi)
- Characteristic: Fl (3) W 15s. 24h
- Northern Ireland no.: CIL-1370

The Maidens lighthouses, on the Maidens in North Channel off County Antrim in Northern Ireland, date from 1829 and were built at the request of merchants and a Royal Navy officer. Lighthouses were built on both rocks; the West Maiden was abandoned in 1903 and the East Maiden was automated in 1977.

== Establishment of lighthouses ==
After receiving requests from Larne merchants and Admiral Benjamin Hallowell Carew for a lighthouse to be placed on The Maidens, George Halpin, the Ballast Board's Inspector of Works and Inspector of Lighthouses, inspected the rocks in 1819. He recommended the placement of two lighthouses. The plans were approved in 1824 and Halpin designed the lighthouses and supervised their construction. Building was completed and the lights switched on by 5 January 1829. The towers were 800 yards apart: the West Tower, on the northern rock, rose 84 feet above sea level and could be seen 13 miles away; the East Tower, on the southern rock, reached 94 feet and was visible from a distance of 14 miles. The keepers of the lighthouses and their families originally lived on site for the whole year. In one case, this led to romance when, in the 1830s, the Assistant Keeper of one lighthouse fell in love with daughter of the keeper of the other, often visiting her by boat; after the families fell out and her father forbade them to meet, they eloped to Carrickfergus on the mainland.

== Abandonment of West Tower ==
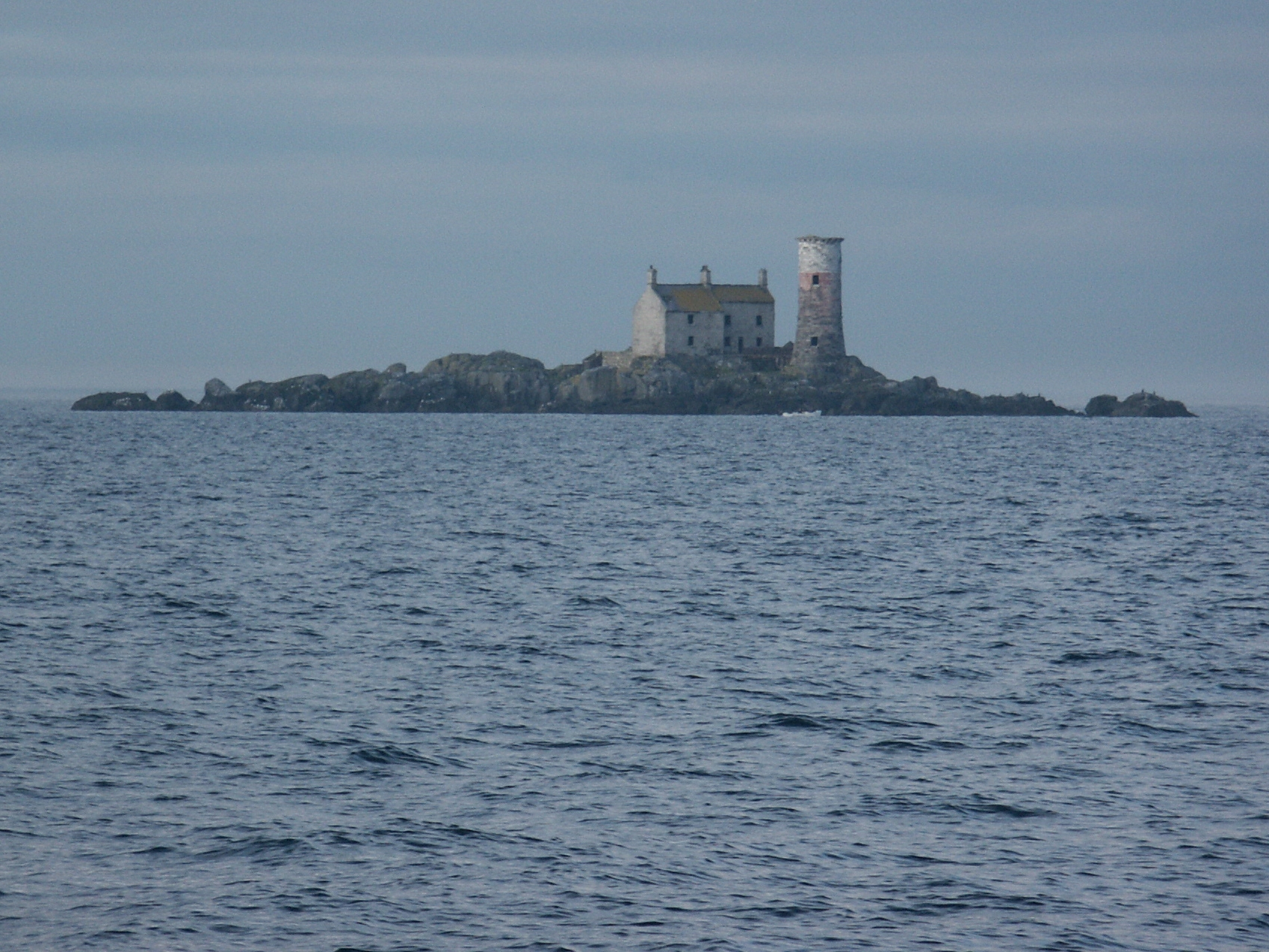
The inactive West Maidens Lighthouse

An extra light, to illuminate the Highland Rocks, was built into a window in the East Tower in 1889. However, the Engineer to the Commissioners of Irish Lights, William Douglass, in December 1898 recommended the establishment of a lightvessel north of the Highland Rocks. It would house a more powerful light and a fog siren, and coupled with increasing the light and addition of a siren to the East Tower would allow the abandonment of the West Tower. This plan, and a further suggestion in 1899, of a light being built on the Highland Rocks came to nothing. However, the light on the East Tower was improved and put into operation on 12 March 1903; the West Tower was abandoned. The solitary working lighthouse was now known as Maidens. The buildings of the old West Tower are still standing; the lighthouse remains intact and the internal stairs and external walkway to the living quarters can still be used. However, the living quarters have decayed into a ruined state. The structures can be seen from the shore.

In 1906, the Maiden was combined with the operation of Ferris Point lighthouse, under the supervision of the Ferris Point keeper. New accommodation for four Assistant Keepers was built at Ferris Point; three assistants now worked on the Maidens at any one time, serving 30 days at the lighthouse followed by 10 days with their family at Ferris Point, when he also assisted the Principal Keeper. The Principal Keeper was also responsible for inspecting the Maidens. However, in 1951, the Maidens was separated from Ferris Point, and once more had its own Principal Keeper. Early in the 1970s, the Commissioners of Irish Lights began a modernisation programme, with the intention of automating the Maidens and passing control to Ferris Point. The accommodation at Ferris Point was demolished and additional Keepers were added to improve the ratio of days spent working at the lighthouse.

== Automation ==
By October 1977, an electric light was added to the lighthouse and by 31 October of that year, the Keepers were withdrawn as the Maidens became an automatic operation and control passed to Ferris Point. Currently, the station is monitored by an Attendant as well as from the headquarters of the Commissioners of Irish Lights at Dún Laoghaire. A racon showing Morse code "M" (--) was added in 1996. The light's nominal range was reduced from 24 to 23 nautical miles in September 2010 and the light characteristic was set at three white flashes every 15 seconds (Fl (3) W 15s). The lighthouse buildings remain in good repair.

== See also ==
- List of lighthouses in Ireland
