= Lot's wife (disambiguation) =

Lot's wife is a biblical figure who turned into a pillar of salt.

Lot's wife may also refer to:

== Geography ==
- Lot's Wife (crag), a volcanic, deserted island located in the Philippine Sea
- Baltimore Beacon, known as "Lot's Wife", a stone beacon at the entrance to the harbour at Baltimore, County Cork, Ireland
- Lot's Wife, a rock off the north coast of Gough Island, in the South Atlantic
- "Lot's Wife" pillar, Mount Sodom, Israel
- Lot's Wife and Lot, rock formations in Saint Helena, in the South Atlantic
- Lot's Wife, nickname of Long Ya Men, a craggy granite outcrop in Keppel Harbour, Singapore, destroyed in 1848
- Lot's Wife, a chalk pillar once part of The Needles formation off the Isle of Wight, UK, until its collapse in 1764
- Lot's Wife sea-stack, Marsden, Tyne and Wear, UK

== Sculptures ==
- Lot's Wife, an 1878 sculpture by Hamo Thornycroft
- Lot's Wife, a 1958 sculpture by Moshe Ziffer

== Literature and media ==
- Lot's Wife (student newspaper) of Monash University's Clayton campus in Melbourne, Australia
- "Lot's Wife", short story by Joseph Heller in Catch as Catch Can

== Movies ==
- Lot's Wife, 2008 short film by Harjant Gill

== Music ==
- "Lot's Wife", reggae song by Prince Alla
- "Lot's Wife", song from the musical Caroline, or Change
