= Bull Rock Lighthouse =

Island off the coast of Ireland

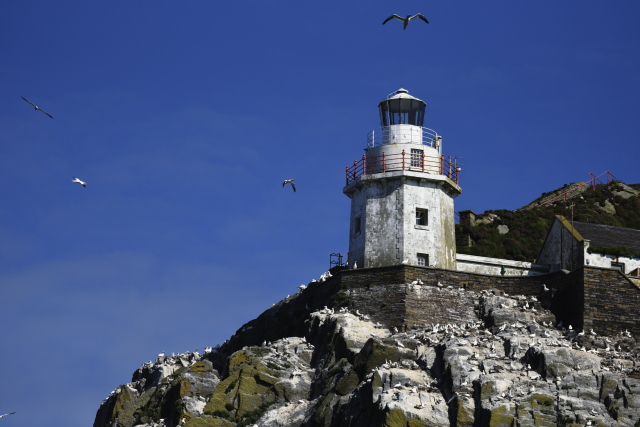
- Location: Atlantic Ocean
- Coordinates: 51°35′32.2″N 10°18′3.6″W

Tower
- Constructed: 1888
- Automated: 1991
- Shape: Octagonal

Light
- First lit: 1889

The Bull Rock Lighthouse, is an active navigational aid located on Bull Rock, 4 km off Dursey Island, Ireland.

Bull Rock is unique in that a hole passes all the way through it. Irish mythology claims the rock as Tech Duinn, the "house of Donn", where the souls of the dead gather. The hole became known as the "Entrance of the Underworld". The rock is uninhabited and cannot be directly visited, but only by boat tours around the rock.

== History ==
The lighthouse is the second one constructed in this location. The first was built in 1866 on nearby Calf Rock. That lighthouse was cast iron, but was destroyed by winds and a rogue wave from an Atlantic storm. The second was built on Bull Rock in 1889.

The first light house was built as a result of a request to establish a light on Bull Rock. However, the commissioners chose Calf Rock. George Halpin designed the iron structure which was constructed by Henry Grissell of Regent's Canal Iron Works in London in 1861. The tower was completed in August 1864. The lantern and machinery were added and the light was turned on 30 June 1866. In 1870 additional strengthening was added to the structure. However on 27 November 1881 the lighthouse was destroyed when the tower snapped in a severe storm. The lighthouse keepers were not in the tower when it shattered, but they were trapped on the Rock for two weeks before rescue was possible.

A temporary light from a ship was put into place at the west end of Dursey Island. It went into operation on 2 February 1882. After the destruction of the tower beyond the ability to be repaired the commissioners had to build the replacement on Bull Rock.

== Current lighthouse ==
The new structure, an octagonal lighthouse tower, was started on 21 April 1884 to a design by William Douglass. It is 22 feet (6.7 m) high and built of rubble masonry, Portland cement and granite dressings. The total cost was £29,000. The building was completed in 1888 and on 1 January 1889 the light was turned on. There were also buildings wherein keepers could live.

There have been a number of changes to the original setup since. The fog warning was replaced with a siren on 1 April 1902 and discontinued on 17 May 1989. The energy source was upgraded to vapourised paraffin on 28 June 1910, using a denatured alcohol burner to heat the paraffin and vaporize it. and to electric power on 21 August 1974. The light was converted to automatic and the keepers removed from the Rock on 31 March 1991. The light was converted to solar power on 6 October 2000.

== Island and construction ==
The Rock and lighthouse are located at the tip, the most Southwestern point, of the Beara Peninsula, and the entrance to Kenmare Bay The rock is among a quartet of rocks that includes Cow Rock, Calf Rock, and Heifer Rock. The island is 750 feet (230 m) by 540 feet (160 m), 305 feet (93 m) to the summit. It is located 4 kilometres (2.5 miles) off Dursey Island and 9 kilometres (5.6 miles) from the mainland. A noteworthy uniqueness is a hole through the middle of the rock that has been described as the "Entrance of the Underworld".

=== Construction ===
In March 1846, Captain J. Wolf requested a lighthouse to be built on Bull Rock. After the lighthouse was built on Calf Rock and destroyed, approval was finally given to build on Bull Rock. Miners were landed on the rock and cut the steps by hand, flattened areas for other construction, and built the keepers quarters that was hewn into the rock. 300 steps were hand chiseled into the stone from the landing to the lighthouse.

== See also ==
- List of lighthouses in Ireland
