= Ballycotton Lighthouse =

Lighthouse in Ireland

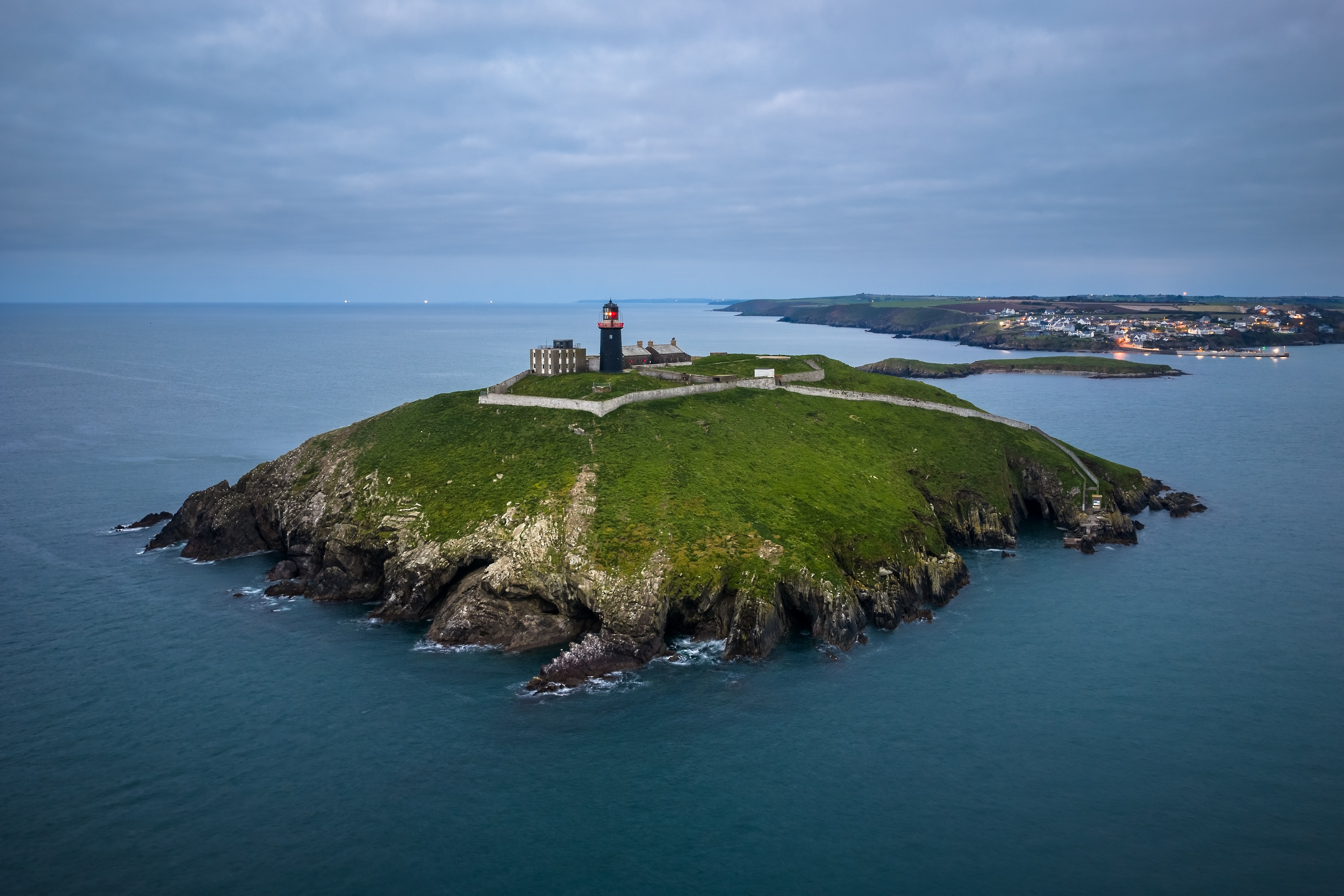
- Ballycotton Lighthouse with Ballycotton village in the background
- Location: Ballycotton Island, County Cork, Ireland
- Coordinates: 51°49′33″N 7°59′03″W

Tower
- Constructed: 1848
- Construction: granite tower
- Automated: 1991
- Height: 15 m (49 ft)
- Shape: cylindrical tower with balcony and lantern
- Markings: black tower, red balcony
- Operator: Commissioners of Irish Lights

Light
- First lit: 1 June 1851
- Focal height: 59 m (194 ft)
- Lens: catadioptric prism (fixed inner), annular lenses (rotating outer)
- Range: 21 nmi (39 km; 24 mi) (white), 17 nmi (31 km; 20 mi) (red)
- Characteristic: Fl WR 10s
- Ireland no.: CIL-0290

Ballycotton Lighthouse is an active 19th century lighthouse positioned on Ballycotton Island, east of Ballycotton, County Cork, on the south coast of Ireland. The lighthouse, which is maintained by the Commissioners of Irish Lights, is described by the National Inventory of Architectural Heritage as "a significant addition to the historical record and maritime heritage of Ireland".

It is one of only a handful of lighthouses in the world painted black, which was chosen to distinguish it from Capel Island's (unlit) beacon. Capel Island is where the lighthouse was initially to be located, but ultimately a decision was made to build it on Ballycotton Island. It is also one of few examples of lighthouses featuring some of the lower panes made of red glass with the consequence that ships approaching too close to land may be warned by an apparent change of colour.

== History ==
The lighthouse was built in response to a number of sinkings in the area, including that of the SS Sirius in January 1847. The cost of the lighthouse was estimated in 1849 to be £10,000.

The lighthouse was designed by George Halpin, and commissioned in 1851 and by 1899 four keepers were housed in the town with keepers rotating duty at the lighthouse. In 1975, the light was converted to electricity and, after introducing automation in 1991, the keepers were withdrawn on 28 March 1992.

Former lighthouse keeper's houses attached to the site are still visible, alongside more recent keepers' accommodation. To the east of the tower there is a white foghorn which aided in navigation; it replaced a much larger fog bell tower which was originally used for this purpose. The foghorn itself, powered by a 1000V line, was decommissioned in 2011. To the west of the tower there is a small helipad.

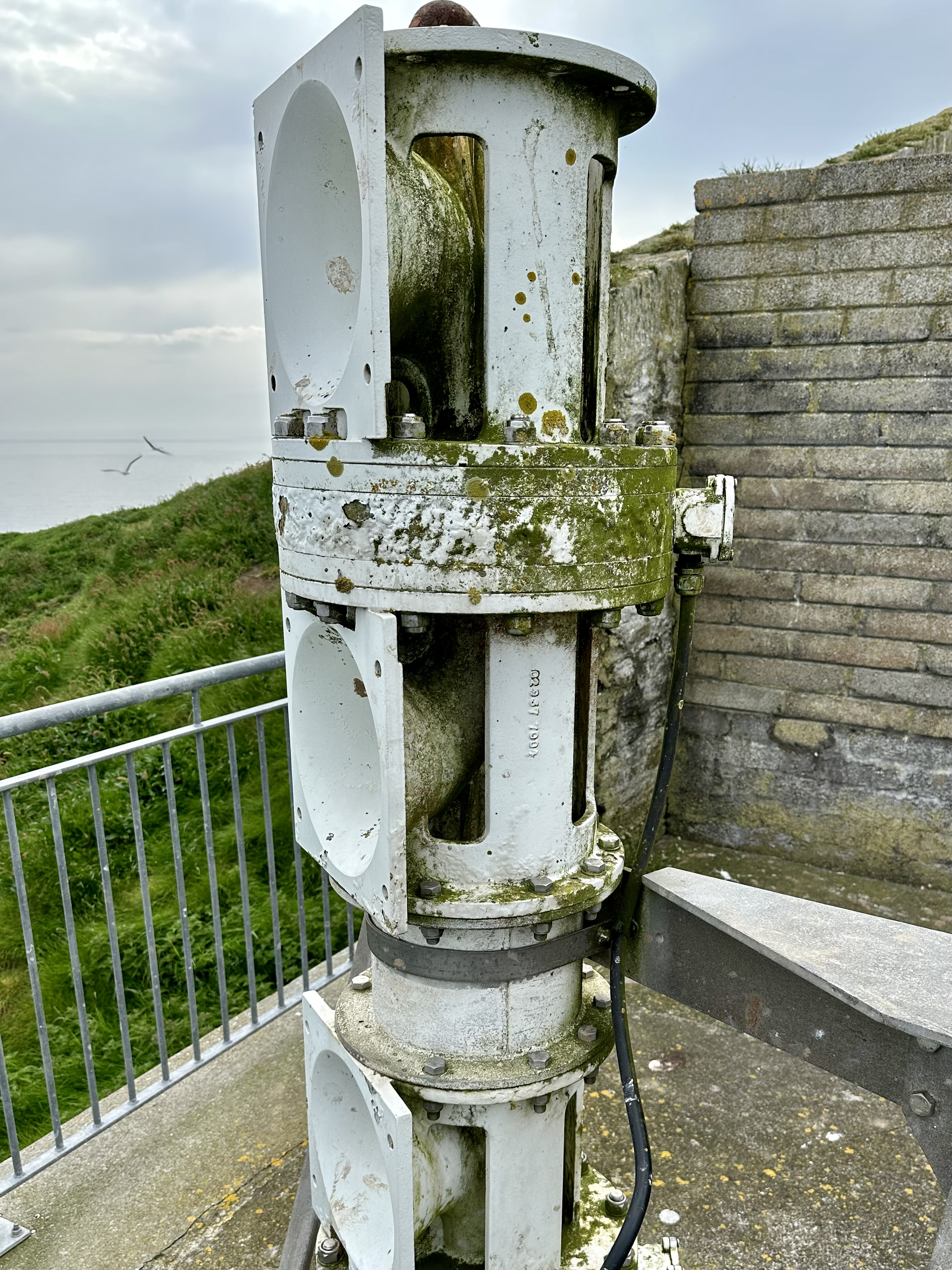
Defunct foghorn on Ballycotton Island

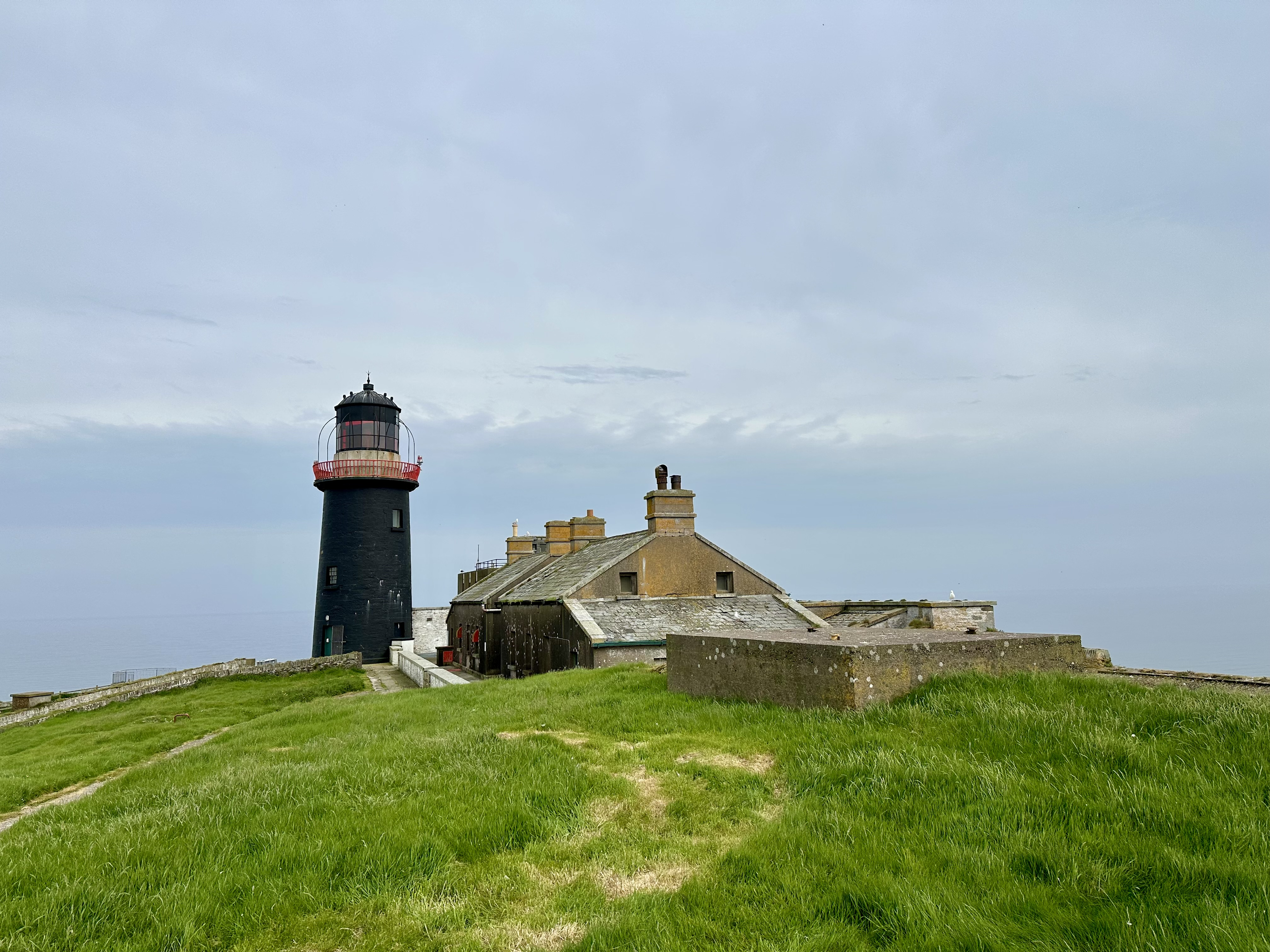
View of the lighthouse from its island

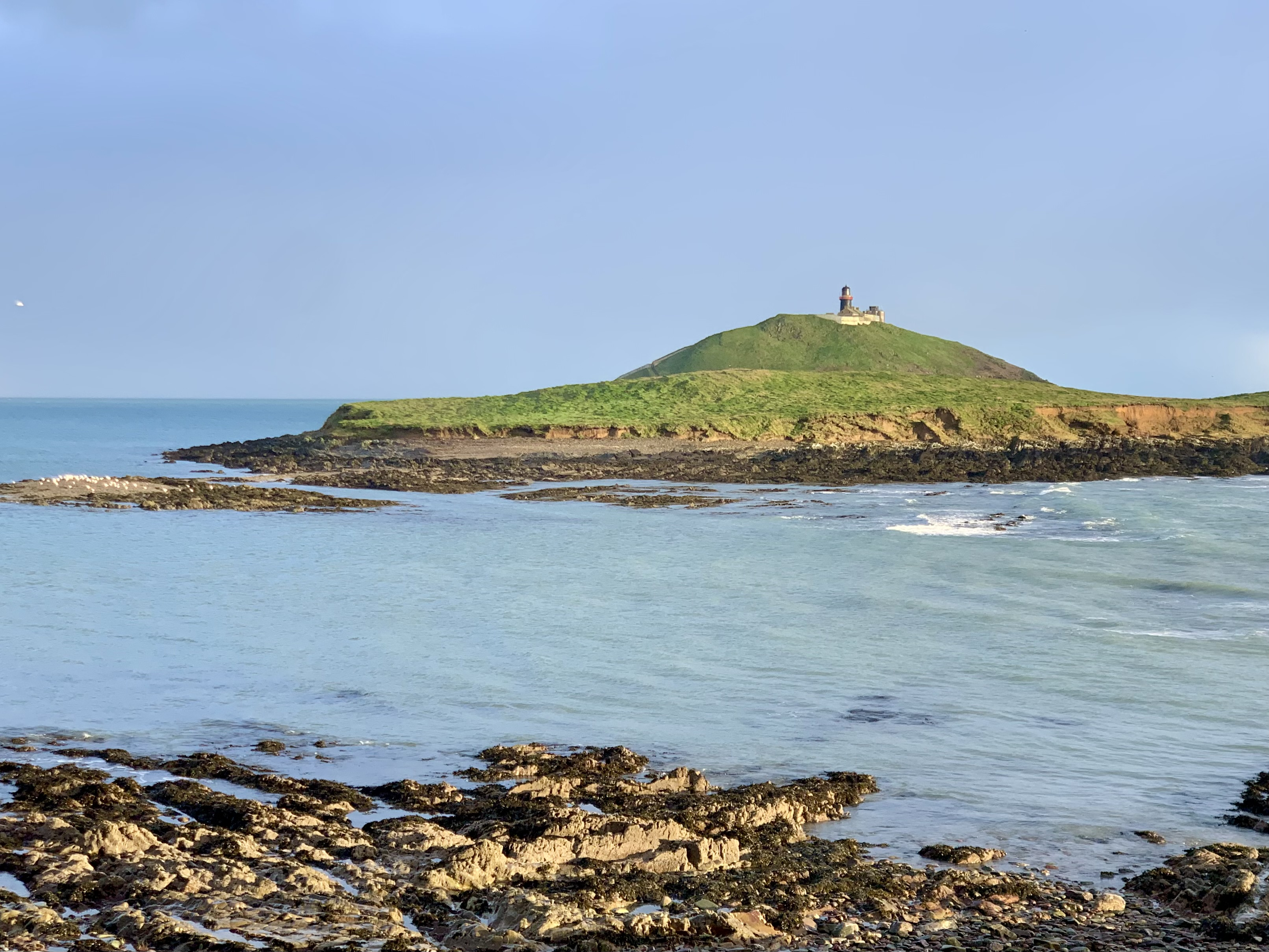
Ballycotton Lighthouse, view from Ballycotton shore

== Tourism ==
The lighthouse can be reached by boat from the Ballycotton harbour. Occasional boat tours to the lighthouse were organised as early as the 19th century, but were officially open to public only in 2014. As of 2023, guided tours were available in English and Polish. A small quay on the island itself facilitates disembarking.
