= Slyne Head Lighthouse =

Lighthouse in Ireland

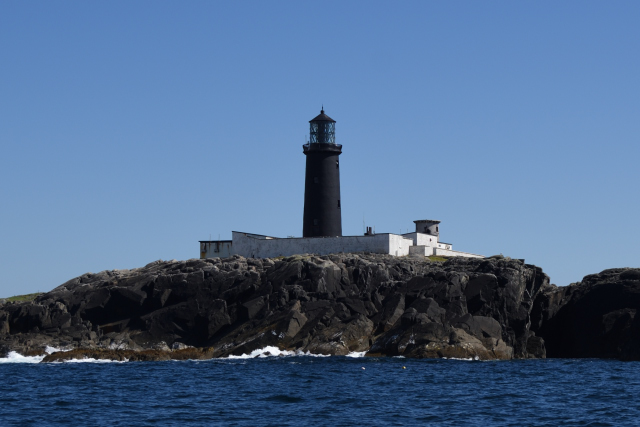
- Location: County Galway, Ireland
- Coordinates: 53°24′00.2″N 10°14′01.6″W

Tower
- Constructed: 1836
- Construction: limestone tower
- Automated: 1990
- Height: 24 metres (79 ft)
- Shape: cylindrical tower with balcony and lantern
- Markings: black tower
- Racon: T

Light
- Focal height: 35 metres (115 ft)
- Range: 19 nautical miles (35 km; 22 mi)
- Characteristic: Fl (2)W 15s
- Ireland no.: CIL-1990

Slyne Head Lighthouse (Irish: Ceann Léime) is located at the westernmost point of County Galway, about 12 kilometres (7 mi) southwest of Dunloughan, Ireland on the island of Illaunamid. It is maintained by Commissioners of Irish Lights (CIL). There were two lighthouses on this point built in 1836, but only the western one remains active.

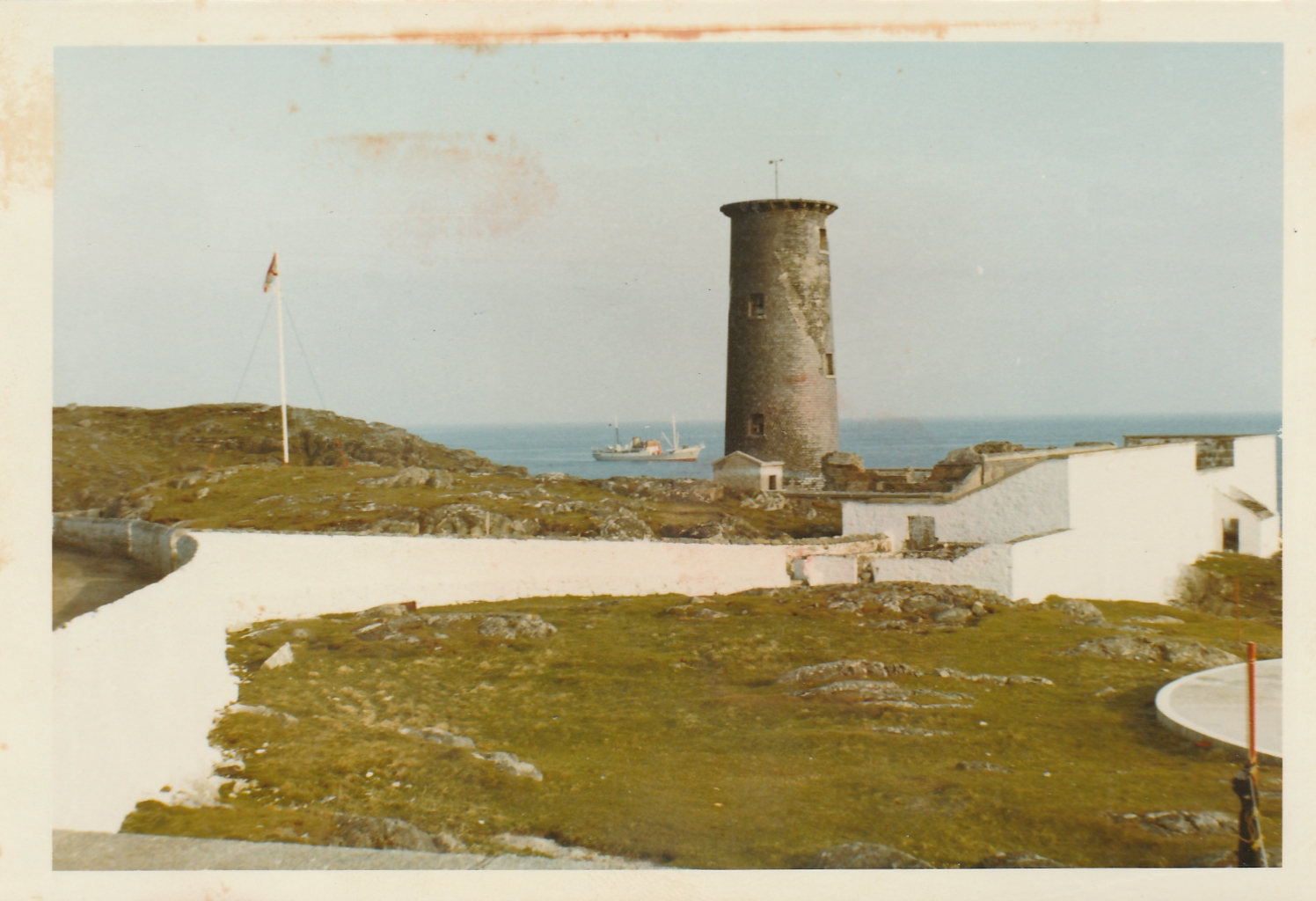
The older of the two lighthouses, pictured in the 1970s

== See also ==
- List of lighthouses in Ireland
