= Ardnakinna Lighthouse =

Island off the coast of Ireland

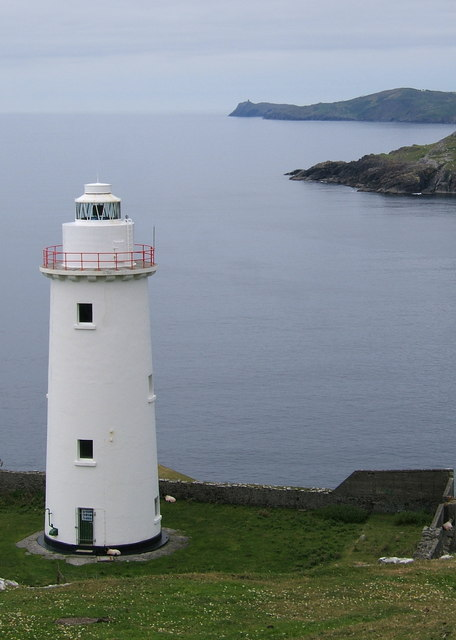
- Location: Bere Island
- Coordinates: 51°37′1.8″N 9°55′4.8″W

Tower
- Constructed: 1850
- Shape: Circular

Light
- First lit: 1965

The Ardnakinna Lighthouse, is an active aid to navigation located on Bere Island, County Cork at the western entrance to Castletownbere.

== History ==
The light, which provides navigation aid on the western entrance to Castletownberehaven, originated as a freestanding circular beacon, recommended in 1847, erected in 1850, and capped in 1863. The beacon was transferred to the Admiralty in 1902, and was discontinued in 1923.

An incident with a trawler in 1945 contributed to the requests for navigation lights in 1948, and a positive recommendation in 1955, but it was only in 1964 that the Minister of Transport gave approval in principle. The old beacon was agreed to be a suitable location, and as it already had a tower form, it required only a lighting device, and one was secured from a lightship. The 1500W lantern has mains and diesel-generator power. The light was formally turned on 23 November 1965 and is looked after, along with two other lights, by an attendant at the Castletownbere helicopter base.

== See also ==
- List of lighthouses in Ireland
