= Mew Island Lighthouse =

Lighthouse in County Down, Northern Ireland

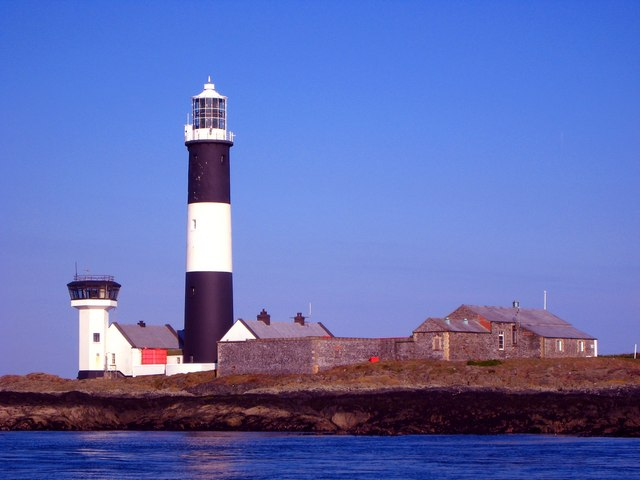
- Mew Island in 2007
- Location: County Antrim, Northern Ireland
- Coordinates: 54.6986°N 5.5136°W

Tower
- Constructed: 1884
- Automated: 1996
- Height: 37 metres (121 ft)
- Operator: Commissioners of Irish Lights
- Heritage: Grade B+ listed building
- Fog signal: discontinued in 1991
- Racon: Morse O

Light
- First lit: 1884
- Focal height: 35 metres (115 ft)
- Lens: LED system
- Range: 18 nautical miles (33 km; 21 mi)
- Characteristic: F.Fl(4) W 30s.

Listed Building – Grade B+
- Designated: 20 December 1976
- Reference no.: HB24/06/034

Mew Island Lighthouse is an active lighthouse within the Copeland Islands of County Down in Northern Ireland. The current 19th-century tower is the most recent in a series of lighthouses that have been built in the islands, which have helped to guide shipping around the archipelago and into Belfast Lough.

A number of different fuels, including coal gas, paraffin, and diesel, have been used to power the lighthouse. In 2015, the Commissioners of Irish Lights, who operate the lighthouse, replaced the hyperradiant Fresnel lens optic with a flashing LED system that uses only solar power. This large optic was then preserved and is now on display in the Titanic Quarter of Belfast as a visitor attraction known as The Great Light.

== Copeland Island ==
The earliest lighthouse in the Copeland Islands was built on Lighthouse Island in 1711 and used coal burnt in a brazier mounted on a three-storey tower above a keeper's cottage. Other cottage lighthouses were established at Howth Head, Loop Head and the Old Head of Kinsale. The tower was improved in 1796 with the addition of a glazed lantern room, with the light coming from "six Argand (circular wick) lamps burning sperm oil. Each of the six lamps was magnified by a parabolic reflector."

In 1810 responsibility for lighthouses in Ireland passed from the Revenue Commissioners to the Ballast Board, the predecessor of the Commissioners of Irish Lights. One of the first improvements made by the board was to replace the existing lighthouse with an adjacent higher tower. Designed by George Halpin, it was lit with nearly five times the number of lamps and reflectors, twenty-seven in all, giving a range of 16 miles (26 km). Known as the Copeland Island Lighthouse, it had a 16-metre-high (52 ft) tower, at a focal plane of 40 metres (131 ft), and was completed in 1815.

Despite these earlier lighthouses, the islands, which are known for the strong tidal currents that surround them, have been the location of various shipwrecks, including the Mermaid in 1854, Betsey in 1814, and the Enterprise in 1801. With a steady increase in trade and associated shipping during the middle of the 19th century to and from Belfast Harbour, there was a need for an improved lighthouse to guide shipping around the islands, and into Belfast Lough. Evidence collected by the Royal Commission on Lights, Buoys, and Beacons in 1861, showed that the existing lighthouse needed to be replaced by one at a lower level on the outer Mew Island.

== Mew Island ==
In 1875 the Belfast Harbour Commissioners asked that the Copeland light be shifted to Mew Island, with the need for a new lighthouse being endorsed by the Board of Trade in 1881. Work on the light began in 1882, to a design by William Douglass. One of the key aspects of the design was to improve on the earlier oil powered light with its simple reflectors, by using gas burners in conjunction with a rotating glass Fresnel lens.

The lighthouse was completed in 1884 and consisted of a 37-metre-high (121 ft) rubble stone tower, with a large glazed lantern room. This housed a substantial first-order optic, the largest type available at that time, from the French lens maker Barbier and Fenestre. This tri-form lens had three tiers of lenses each with its own set of 108 gas burners. The output from the light could be varied according to the number of jets used. On a clear night just 32 were lit in the lower tier, but in poor conditions such as fog all three tiers could be lit using 324 burners.

The contractor for the works was Thomas S. Dixon Co. of Belfast, who also built the adjacent keeper's house on the island; five other houses were built by H. Fulton on the mainland at Donaghadee to act as shore dwellings for the keepers and their families. The gas used in the light and the fog siren engines was generated by burning cannel coal in a gas plant alongside the tower and was stored in gasometers until used.

=== Hyperradiant optic ===
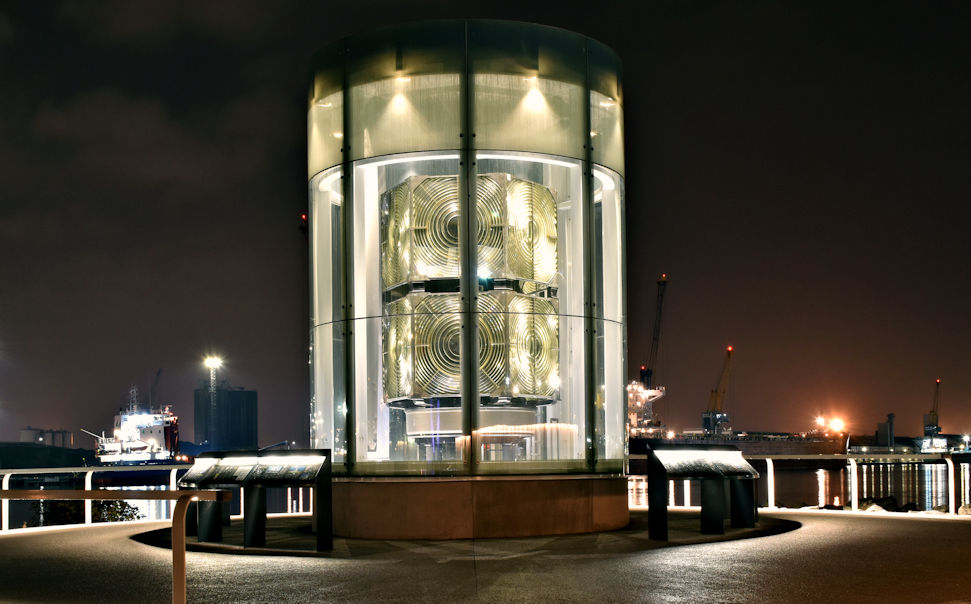
A night time view of The Great Light on the Titanic Walkway

Ongoing problems with the first-order optic meant that it needed replacing, so it was decided to use the hyperradiant optic that had originally been designed for the Tory Island lighthouse, where it had been installed in 1887. Made by the same French manufacturer as the first-order lens, the hyperradiant is the largest type ever used for lighthouses, having a focal length or radius of 1,330 mm (52 in). Like the first-order optic it had a tri-form configuration, consisting of three tiers of lenses stacked above each other, with each tier having six panels, spanning 60 degrees.

In the 1920s, it was removed from Tory Island, and re-engineered by Chance Brothers in Smethwick, where it was reduced in size to a bi-form system with two tiers. Two of the six bullseye panels were replaced by metal blanks, producing a light characteristic of four flashes of white light every thirty seconds. To enable the optic to turn freely it was mounted upon a circular bath of mercury known as a mercury float, providing an almost frictionless bearing. The redesigned light was then installed at Mew Island in 1928. It was lit using paraffin, making the coal plant redundant, the last in use at an Irish light. In 1969 generators were installed at the lighthouse, allowing the use of electric light to replace the paraffin burners, and an electric motor to replace the weight driven rotation system.

The hyper-radial lens, which weighed 10 t (9.8 long tons; 11 short tons), was carefully removed from the lighthouse in 2014 and transferred to the mainland by the ILV Granuaile. After restoration at the Commissioners of Irish Lights workshop in Dún Laoghaire, it was shipped back by Granuaile to Belfast to be put on display in "a new interpretive structure, made to resemble a lighthouse lantern room" on the waterside walkway in the Titanic Quarter. The majority of the £447,000 cost of the new structure was met by a Heritage Lottery Fund grant, with other contributions from Belfast City Council and Ulster villages.

=== LED system ===
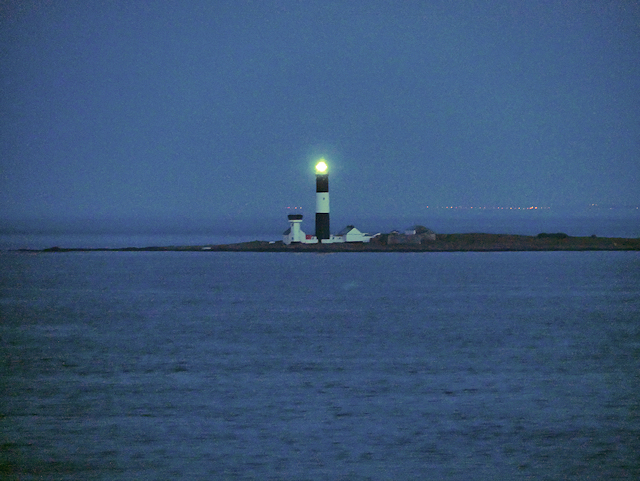
The change to the LED light shown here in 2017, has been controversial

A temporary light was displayed until 2015, when a solar powered LED system was commissioned that uses flashing illuminants to mimic the characteristic of the rotating lens. Its installation reduced the range from 24 nautical miles (44 km; 28 mi) of the hyperradiant apparatus to 18 nmi (33 km; 21 mi), and the focal height to 35 m (115 ft). In 2017, it was enhanced with an additional fixed light, changing the light characteristic slightly from four flashes every 30 seconds, with "A new low luminous intensity fixed light [that] will be combined with the existing flashing light of higher luminous intensity in order to assist with acquisition of the light during the eclipse period."

The change to the LED system and the removal of the optic from Mew Island has been criticised. Campaigners argue that the changes made were unnecessary and that there has been a lack of maintenance since the keepers left, with fixtures and fittings destroyed during the changeover. Protests at other Irish lighthouses marked for changes to LED lighting have also occurred, using Mew Island as an example of what can happen. At St John's Point also in County Down, campaigners argue that the LED beam is too harsh compared to the traditional system. The response from the commissioners is that the changes allow the removal of mercury which is a hazardous substance, and that the LEDs are more energy-efficient, allowing the use of solar power.

=== Fog signal ===
Foggy conditions make the islands especially hazardous; a fog bell at the Copeland lighthouse was added in 1851 after three steam ships had run aground. The need for an improved fog signal was important as further groundings had occurred. A twin fog siren was installed at Mew, with a high and low note sounding at intervals for four seconds. More powerful compressors and engines were added in 1899. The system was replaced by a diaphone fog horn in 1929, which continued in service until 1991.

=== Buildings and operation ===
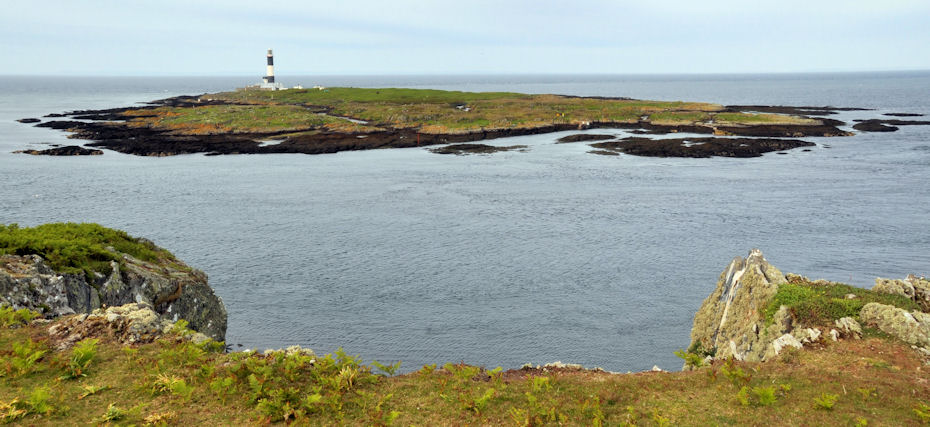
The lighthouse and the low lying Mew Island

Initially painted black, the cement rendered tower was given a broad white band following repairs in 1954. In the 1970s an additional white tower surmounted by a large octagonal watch room was built, connected to the engine room.

The lighthouse complex, including the tower and associated buildings, has been protected as a category B+ listed building since 1976. The listing states that the lighthouse "is a testament to the ambition of the Commissioners of Irish Lights and the skills of the nineteenth century engineers and workmen who built it."

Following automation of the lighthouse in 1996, the keepers were no longer required to live on the island, ending a service that had kept the light operating for 112 years.

The lighthouse has an automatic identification system transmitter and a radar beacon emitting the letter O as a Morse character (— — —). It is registered under the international Admiralty number A5976 and it has the NGA identifier of 114–6792.

== See also ==
- List of Grade B+ listed buildings in County Down
- List of lighthouses in Ireland
