= Cromwell Point Lighthouse =

Lighthouse on Valentia Island in Ireland

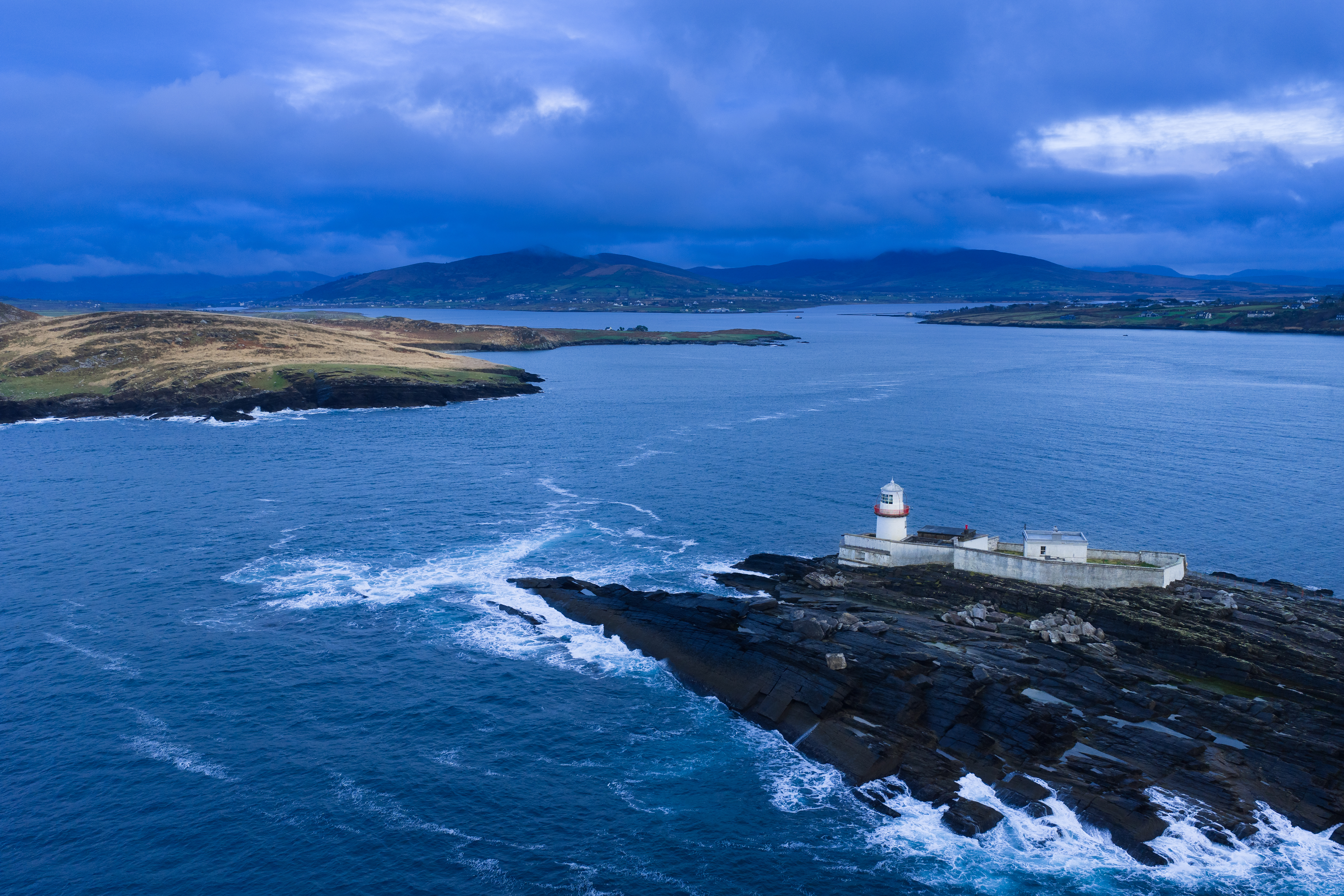
- Aerial view of the lighthouse
- Location: Valentia Island, County Kerry, Ireland
- Coordinates: 51.93378°N 10.32122°W

Tower
- Constructed: 1837
- Construction: stone
- Automated: 1947
- Height: 15 m
- Markings: White
- Operator: Commissioners of Irish Lights

Light
- First lit: 1841
- Focal height: 16 m (52 ft)
- Range: White 17 nautical miles, Red 15 nautical miles
- Characteristic: Fl WR 2s

Cromwell Point Lighthouse, also known as Valentia Lighthouse, is an active 19th century lighthouse located on Valentia Island's Cromwell Point in County Kerry, Ireland. It provides guidance for vessels entering Valentia Harbour from the north.

== History ==
The site of the lighthouse had been earlier occupied by Cromwell Fleetwood Fort, believed to have been built in 16th century. While the promontory is named "Cromwell Point" after the fort, locally it is known as "Seithe". The fort ceased its operations in 1669, but the outline of the fortifications is still discernible within today's lighthouse's enclosing walls. Cannons from the former fort have also been preserved.

For the first time, the lighthouse was applied for in March 1828, but it hadn't been until 1837 when the construction started, based on the design of George Halpin. The first light was lit on 1 February 1841, but the remaining lighthouse work was only completed in 1842, at the total cost of close to 11,000 British pounds. Originally the lighthouse was staffed by a single lightkeeper who lived there with the family; after automation had been implemented, only part-time supervision was required.

On 2 June 2013, the lighthouse was opened to visitors for the first time, and in 2022 it was reported that close to 50,000 people visited the site in the 9-year period. As of the early 21st century, the building operates as a lighthouse heritage centre, and lighthouse tours are organised.

== Design ==
The tower is built of cut stone painted white, and the existing fort walls were used with only minimal alterations. The lantern is 16 m above the sea level, and when first established the light was fixed white, 2000 candlepower. It could be seen from 19 km in clear weather. In 1947 a carbide-water acetylene generator was installed and the light was automated, with white and red sections, and the character of 0.5s flash alternating with 1s dark. After the lighthouse was electrified in 1966, the candlepower of the white light was increased to 34,500, and the character altered to 0.5 flash alternating with 1.5s dark. There is also a standby generator to provide electric power in case of ESB supply failure.

In the lighthouse's vicinity, the first transatlantic communications cable was laid between Ireland and New Foundland.
