= Baily Lighthouse =

Lighthouse on the Howth peninsula, County Dublin, Ireland

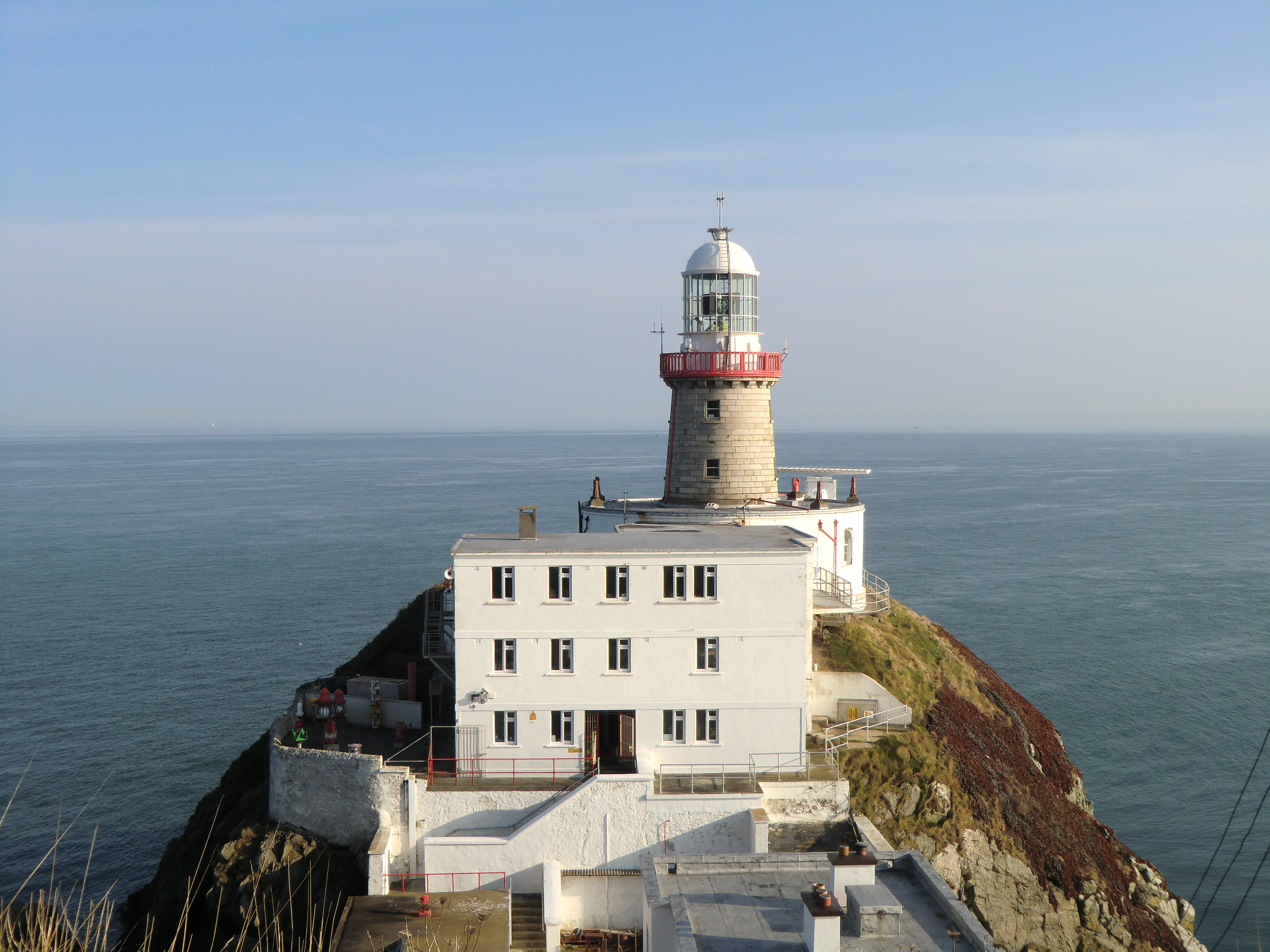
- Baily Lighthouse on Howth Head
- Location: Howth Head, County Dublin; Ireland
- Coordinates: 53°21′41.6″N 6°03′08.8″W

Tower
- Constructed: 1814
- Construction: granite tower
- Automated: 1996
- Height: 13 metres (43 ft)
- Shape: cylindrical tower with balcony and lantern centered on the keeper's house
- Markings: unpainted tower, white lantern, red rail
- Operator: Commissioners of Irish Lights

Light
- Focal height: 41 metres (135 ft)
- Lens: first order Fresnel lens
- Range: 26 nmi (48 km)
- Characteristic: white flash every 15 s
- Ireland no.: CIL-0890

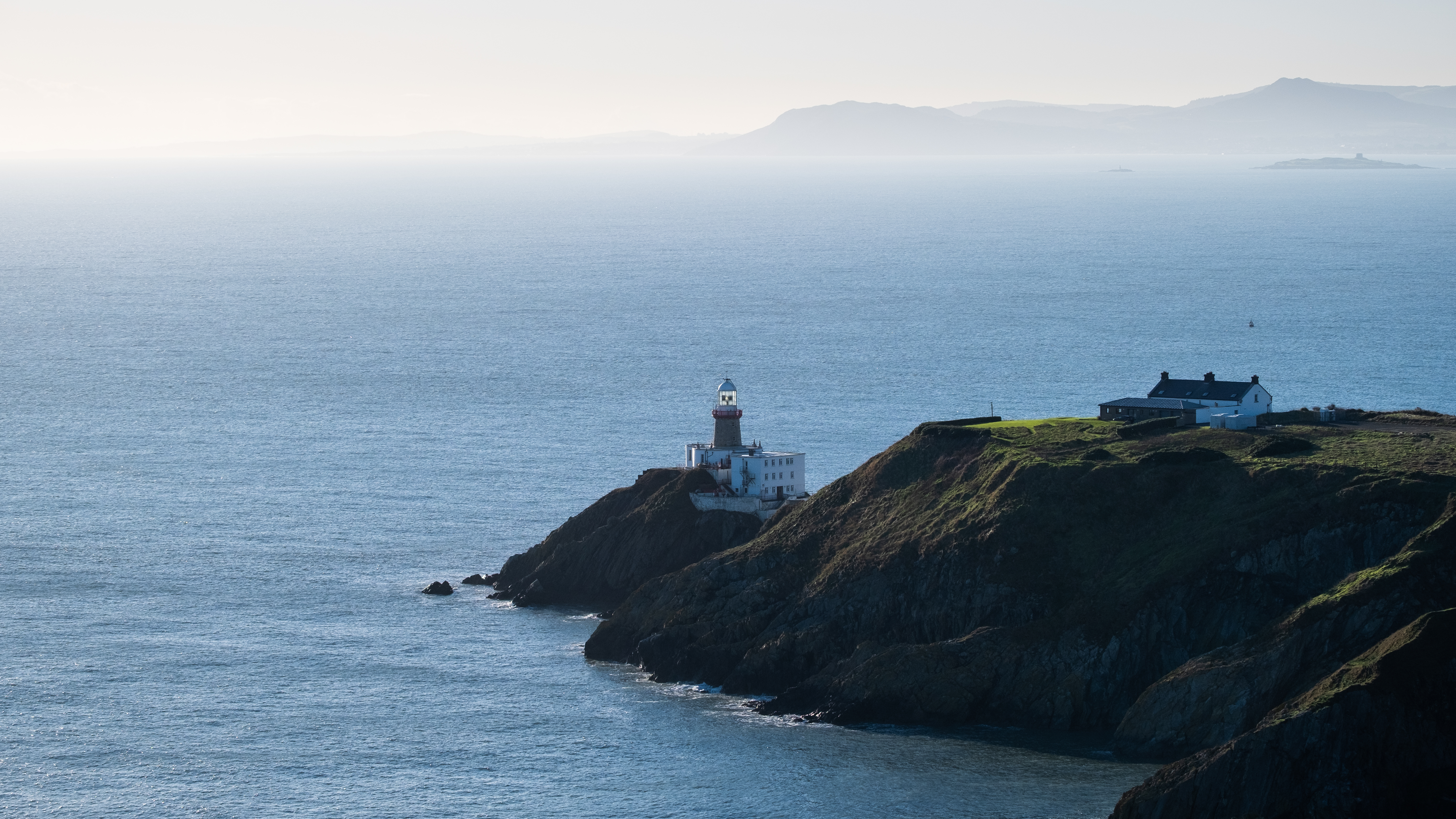
Baily Lighthouse on Howth Head

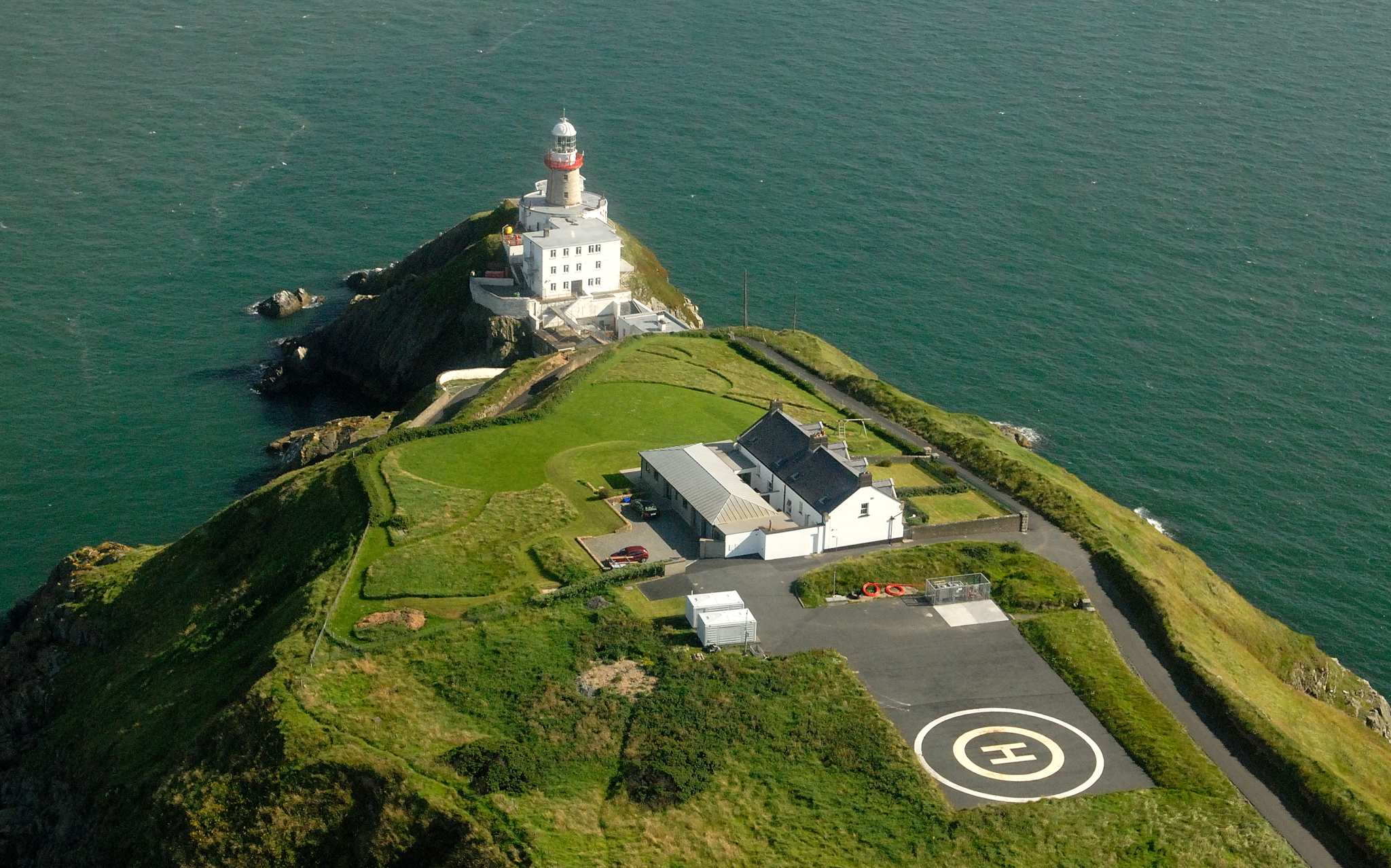
Baily Lighthouse on Howth Head – Helicopter Approach

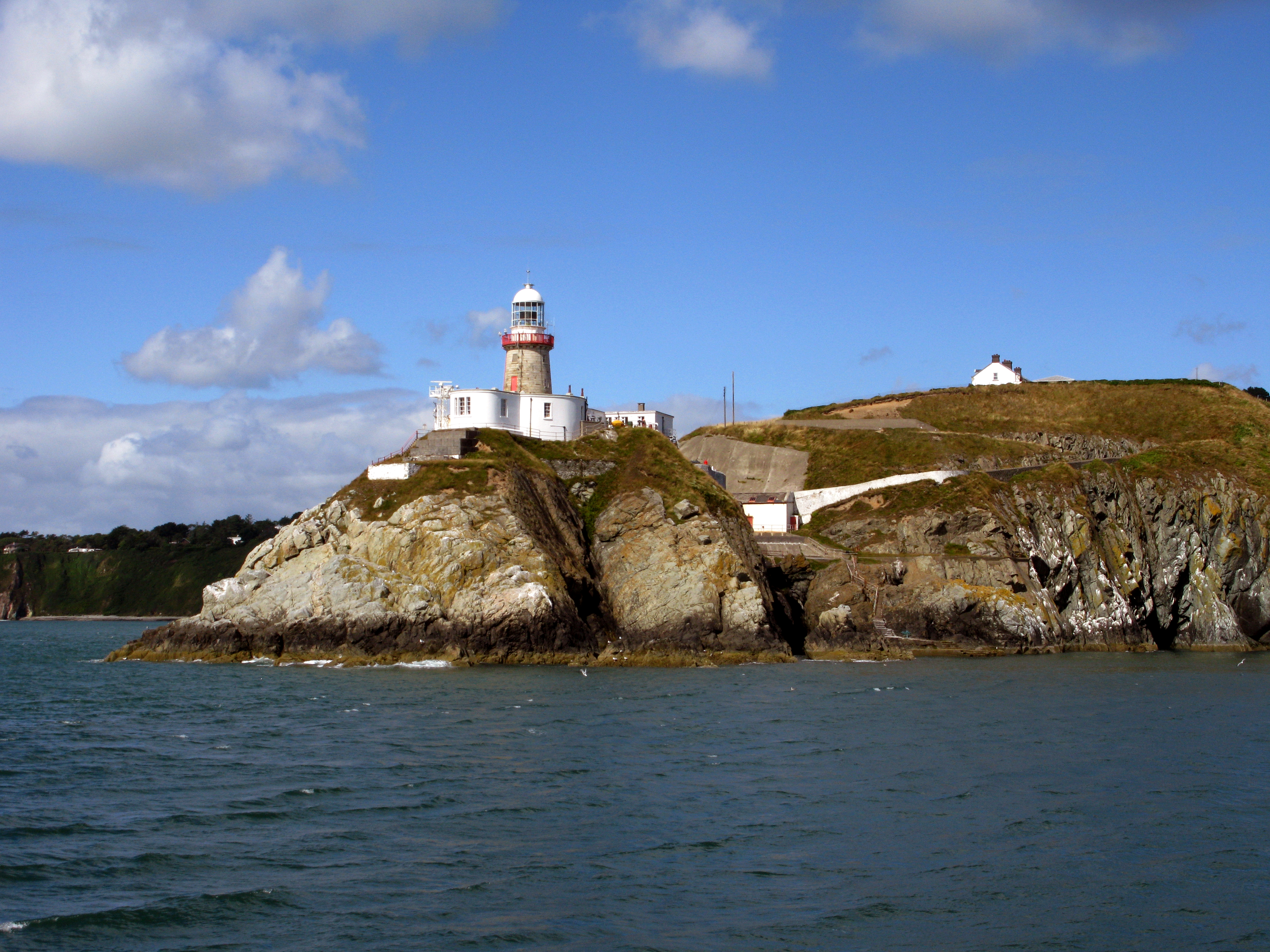
Baily Lighthouse, Howth. Seen from Dublin Bay. 2013

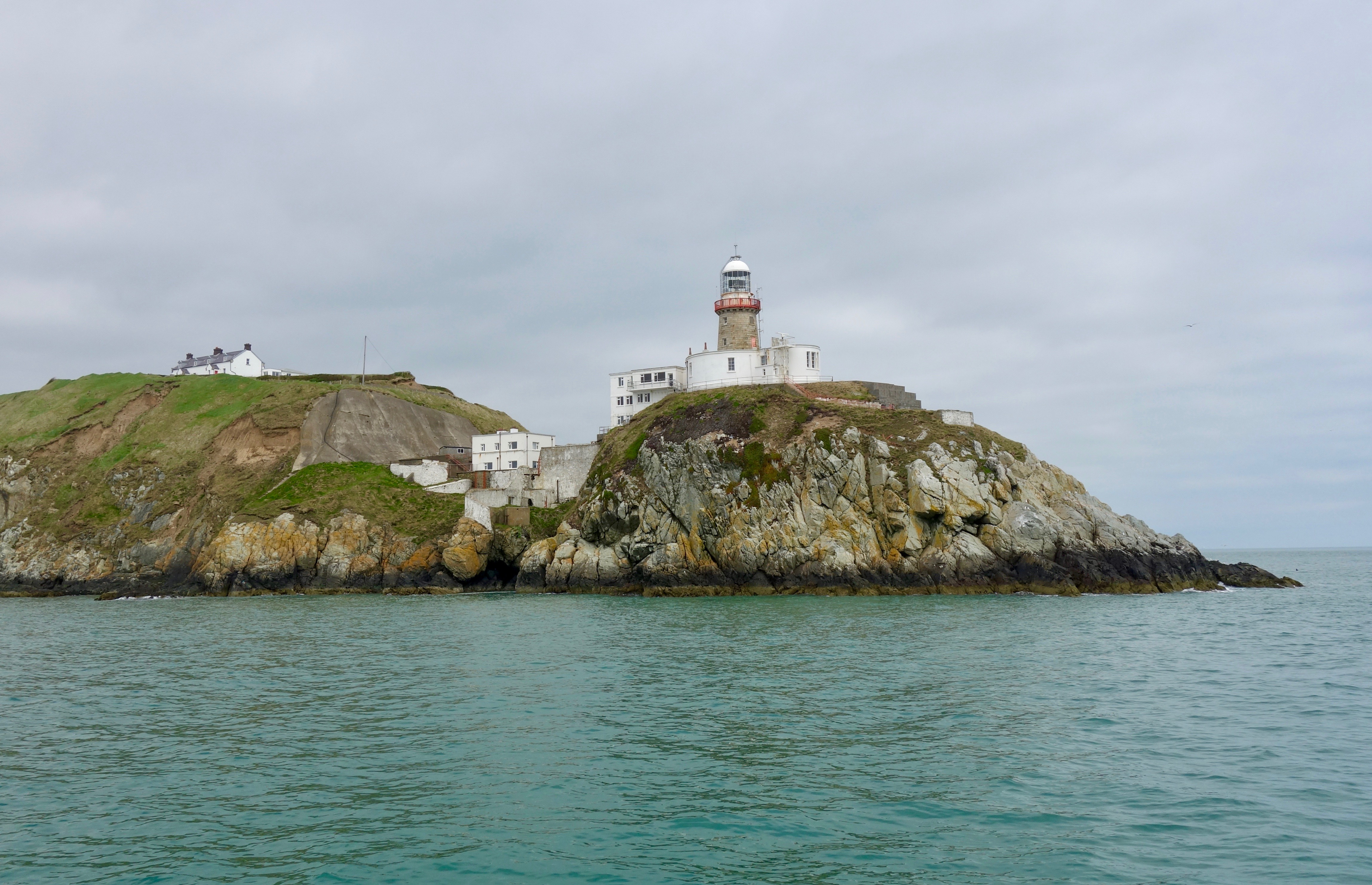
Baily Lighthouse, Howth, viewed from SW, 2018.

The Baily Lighthouse (Irish: Teach Solais Dhún Criofainn) is a lighthouse on the southeastern part of Howth Head in County Dublin, Ireland. It is maintained by the Commissioners of Irish Lights.

== History ==
=== Early history ===
The first lighthouse on this site was built in about 1667 by Sir Robert Reading and was one of six that Reading had received letters patent to build from Charles II in 1665. The original facility consisted of a small cottage and a square tower which supported a coal-fired beacon. Parts of the original buildings remain. In 1790, the coal beacon was replaced with a set of six Argand oil lamps, each including a silvered copper parabolic and a bulls-eye glass pane. During this period, the lighthouse was maintained by a lighthouse contractor who was a Revenue Commissioner inspector.

=== New site ===
In 1810, the Corporation for Preserving and Improving the Port of Dublin took over the operations. The original building's location was high on the headland, so the light was often obscured by fog. On 5 December 1811, a recommendation was issued that the lighthouse be moved south on the headland to Little Baily, or Dungriffen. A new tower and house for the keeper, designed by George Halpin Senior, the corporation's Inspector of Works, was completed on 17 March 1814. The top of the tower stood 41 metres (134 ft) above the sea, and the fixed white catoptric light was provided by a set of 24 Argand lamps and reflectors.

=== Shipwrecks ===
The area was the scene of several shipwrecks. On 3 August 1846 the City of Dublin Steam Packet Company's paddle steamer Prince ran into the cliffs about 2½ km north of Baily in heavy fog, and as a result, it was decided that fog bells should be installed at the lighthouse. This work was delayed due to costs of other construction projects. The most notable wreck was the tragedy of the PS Queen Victoria on 15 February 1853, in which over 80 passengers and crew died. The fog bell was finally installed in April 1853, as a result of the Queen Victoria shipwreck and its subsequent Board of Trade inquiry.

=== Improvements ===
In 1865, the light source was improved from catoptric to first order dioptric. At the same time, John Richardson Wigham had patented a gas-burning light, so experiments with this new system were tried at Baily. A gas works was built at the station to produce the fuel, first from oil, then shale, and finally rich cannel coal. The experiments were a success, and the system was added to nine other lighthouses.

An air horn was installed in 1871 for times of fog, which was replaced with a siren in 1879. The bell was kept as a standby system until 1890. The siren was replaced by a diaphone in 1926.

In 1892, two additional homes for Assistant Keepers were built. In 1902, a system was installed that caused the gas light to flash once every 30 seconds, instead of shining continually. In 1908, the gas light was replaced with one using incandescent vaporised paraffin. In 1953, a larger house was built for the Principal Keeper below the lighthouse.

== Operations in modern times ==
In June 1972 the system was electrified, with a 1,500-watt bulb in a rotating lens, producing a flash every 20 seconds (On 27th February 1996 the light characteristic was changed to a white flash every 15 seconds) that can be seen at a range of 26 nautical miles (48 km). In 1973, additional dwellings for Supernumerary Assistant Lighthouse Keepers were built, as the Baily lighthouse became a training facility for Supernumerary Assistant Lighthouse Keepers who would then transfer to other lighthouses.

Modern technology made light a secondary warning system, and a radio beacon became the primary method of warning ships. Starting in 1978, the light was operated only in poor visibility, along with the fog signal. The fog signal was finally discontinued in 1995.

In late 1996, the lighthouse was converted to automatic operation, and the last of the Keepers left on 24 March 1997, making Baily the last Irish lighthouse to go automatic. The radio beacon service was discontinued in 1999, and at the same time, radar and additional communications equipment were installed. Although officially an automatic station, an attendant still lives in the Principal Keeper's residence.

Part of the original lighthouse structure and the adjoining buildings have now been reconditioned as offices for emergency management software company D4H. D4H was founded by an Irish Coast Guard volunteer in 2018. In 2025, D4H was acquired by London headquartered group EcoOnline for an undisclosed sum.

== Museum ==
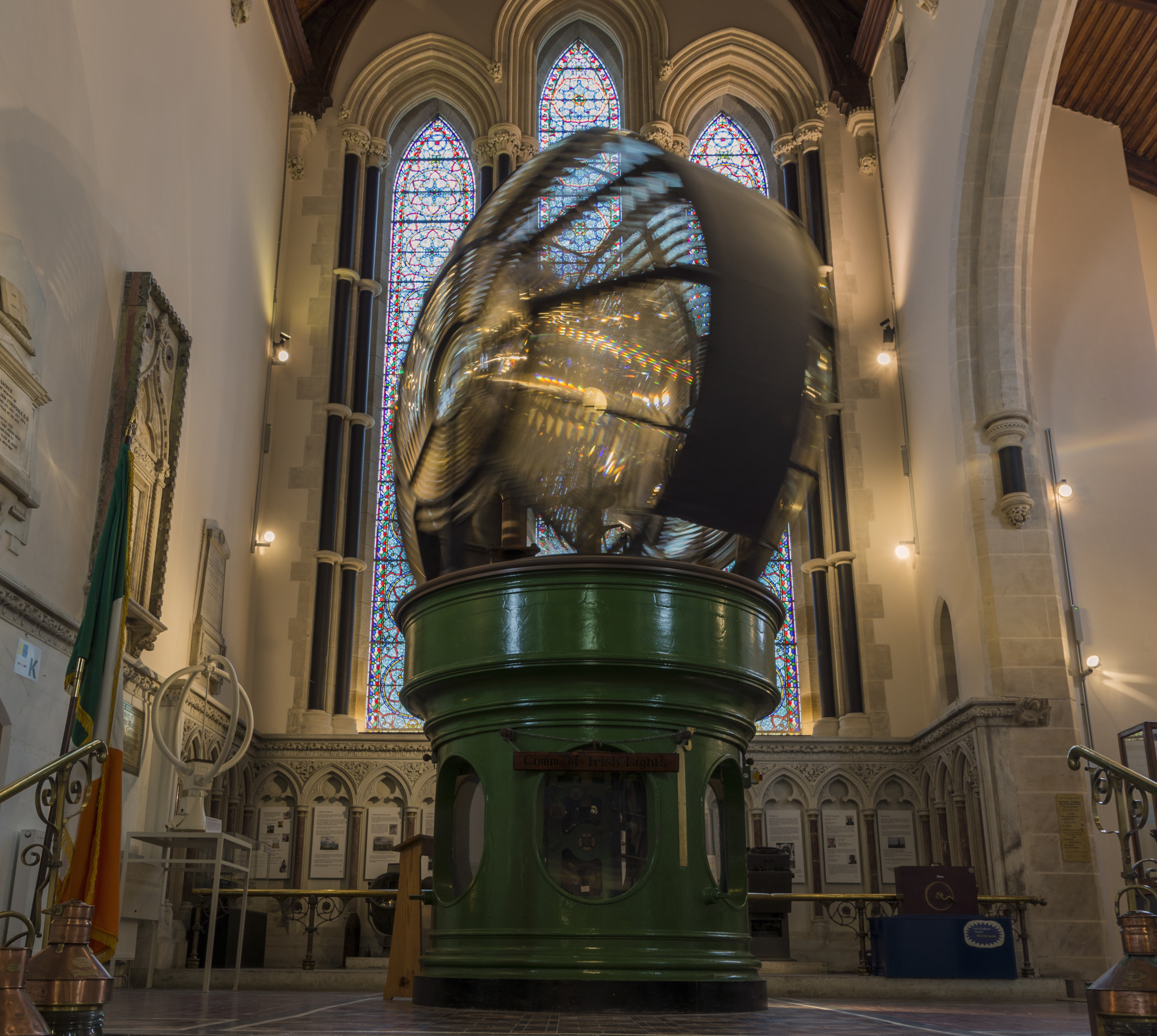
The 1902 Optic, removed in 1972 when the lighthouse was modernised

The optic which was in use from 1902 to 1972 is now on display in the National Maritime Museum of Ireland.

In 2000, a small museum was established in the reworked buildings by the Commissioners of Irish Lights, including small artefacts gathered from retired staff. This museum is not open routinely but by arrangement for staff and former staff, their families, and small interest groups.

== In Literature ==
The preservation of shipping afforded by this lighthouse is reflected on in Letitia Elizabeth Landon's 1834 poem, Howth Light-House.

== See also ==
- Lighthouses in Ireland
