= The Maidens =

Islands in the United Kingdom

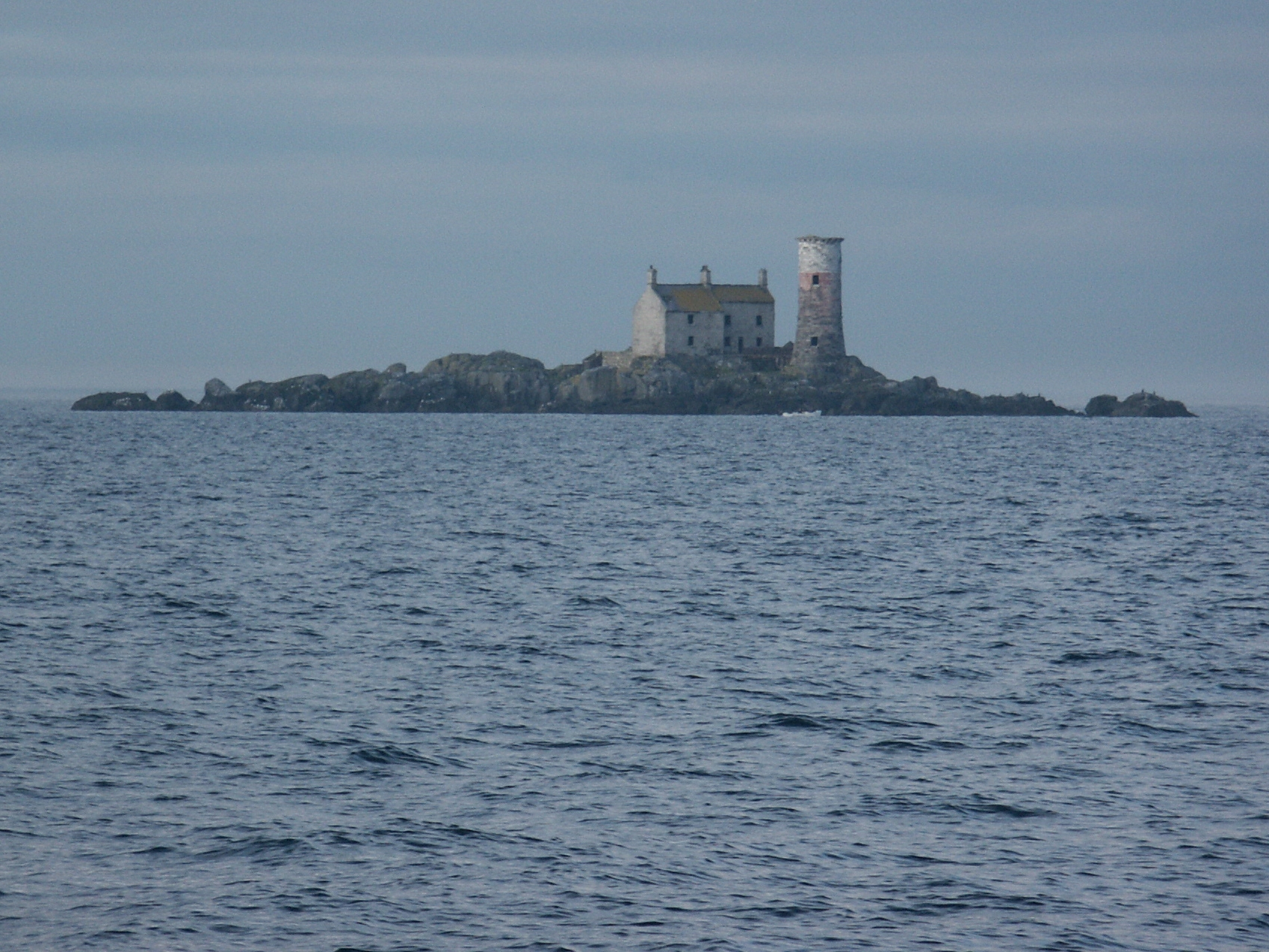
Old Maidens Lighthouse

The Maidens (Irish: Na Maighdeanacha) or Hulin Rocks (Irish: Na Faoilinn, meaning 'the seagulls') are two islets and several skerries in the North Channel off County Antrim in Northern Ireland. The Eastern Maiden or Southern Rock lies about 9 km from the coast at Ballygalley, or 13 miles from Larne. The West Maiden or Northern Rock is about half a mile further out. Lighthouses were built on both rocks; the West Maiden was abandoned in 1903 and the East Maiden was automated in 1977.

== Geology ==
The Maidens is an example of an olivine-dolerite sill, one of many similar intrusions along the Antrim coast. They were formed during the Paleogene and Neogene periods (66 million to 2.6 million years ago), a period of intense volcanic activity in Northern Ireland. The Giant's Causeway, also from this time period, was created by volcanic eruption. At the Maidens, magma was forced underground through layers of weakness, but never reached the surface. It cooled more slowly, solidifying and leaving a hard rock, relatively resistant to weathering compared to the strata around it and so forming the islands left today. Other examples of nearby sills are Fair Head, the Portrush sill which forms Ramore Head and the Skerries, and the Knocksoghey Sill near Ballintoy, part of which forms Sheep Island.

== See also ==
- Geology of Northern Ireland
