= Baltimore Beacon =

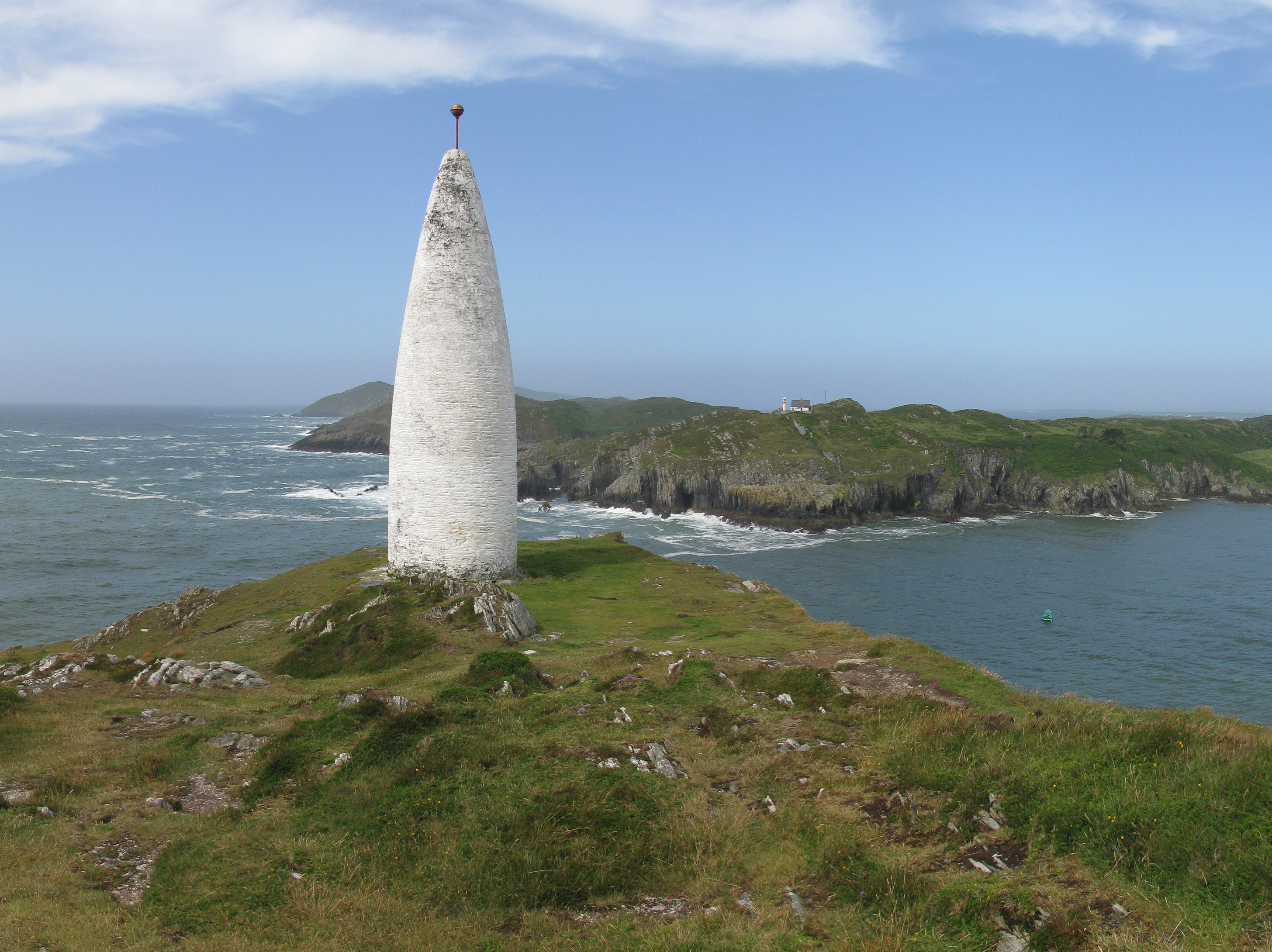
- Beacon with Sherkin Island and its lighthouse visible in distance
- Interactive map of Baltimore Beacon
- 51.47360°N 9.38779°W
- Type: navigational beacon
- Location: Baltimore, County Cork

History
- Built: 1848

The Baltimore Beacon is a white-painted stone beacon positioned high above the channel between the mainland and Sherkin Island near the entrance to the harbour at Baltimore, County Cork, Ireland.

The structure is approximately 50 feet (15 m) high and 15 feet (4.6 m) in diameter at the base, and is situated on the top of a cliff, itself 160 feet (49 m) in height. It is built of rubble stone into a tapered conical shape with a red-painted spherical metal finish on the top. It constitutes part of a series of lighthouses and beacons dotted around the Irish coast to assist in marine navigation.

The beacon is locally known as "Lot's Wife", after the Biblical woman turned into a pillar of salt. The beacon has become a recognizable part of Baltimore's landscape, and one of the area's defining landmarks. The structure is featured on photographs and paintings of Baltimore. Southern Star newspaper's column with news from Baltimore and the area was titled "From Baltimore Beacon". Local businesses adopted the beacon as a part of its name, with a notable example of Baltimore's now defunct Beacon Park Hotel. The feature is an attraction for tourists and day trip visitors, and "there is no end of people who get engaged", and even married there.

== History ==
The beacon was built in 1848 after it had been noticed that an older warning beacon existing at the entrance of the Baltimore Harbour went into ruin.

The wreck of a 17-century ship HMS Looe lies at the base of the beacon cliff.

The decision to declassify the beacon as a navigational tool caused confusion in the 2010s as to who is the actual owner and as such should maintain the beacon, and in particular re-paint it in white.

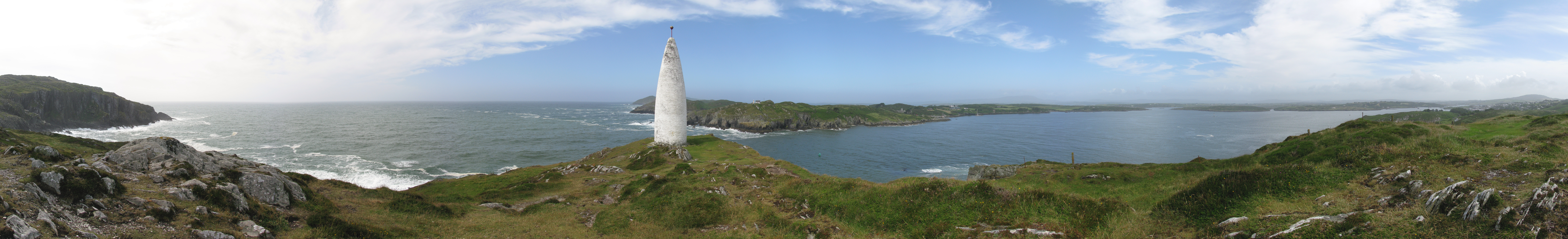
View of Baltimore Beacon near Baltimore, Co. Cork, Ireland.

== See also ==
- Lighthouses in Ireland
