= George Halpin =

Irish civil engineer

- Born: 1774/1779; Leinster, Ireland
- Died: 8 July 1854
- Engineering career
- Discipline: Civil
- Projects: Port of Dublin

George Halpin (Sr.) (1774/1779? – 8 July 1854), was a prominent civil engineer and lighthouse builder, responsible for the construction of much of the Port of Dublin, several of Dublin's bridges, and a number of lighthouses; he is considered the founding father of the Irish lighthouse service. His son, George Halpin, was also a well-known lighthouse builder.

== Life ==
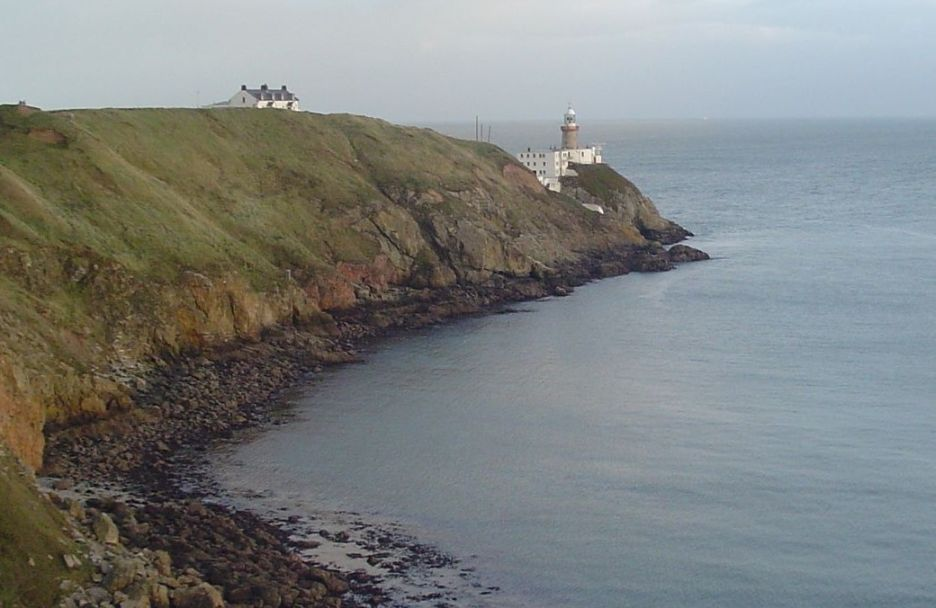
The Baily light, designed by George Halpin, on Howth Head

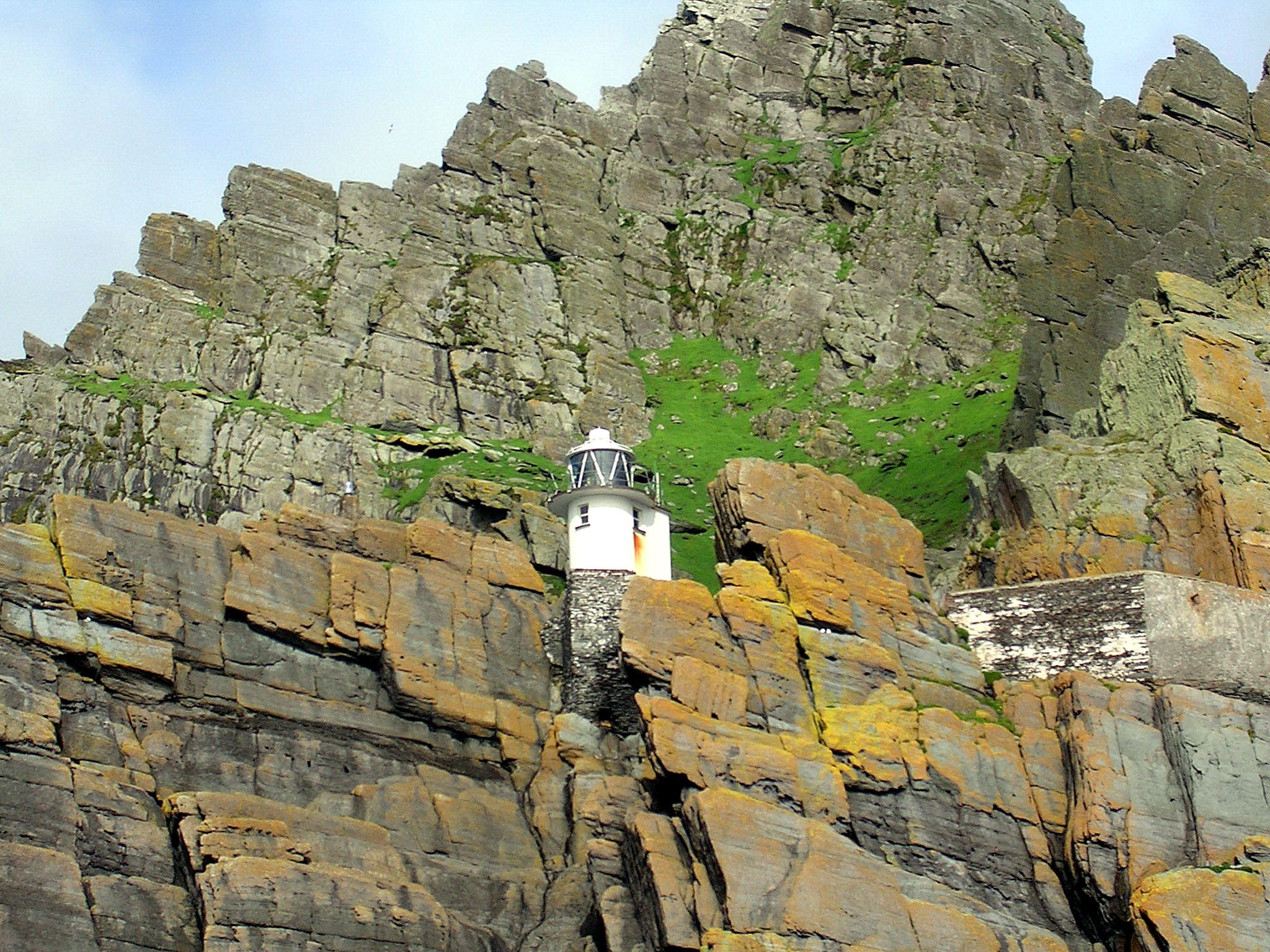
The Skelligs Lighthouse

Halpin is thought to have been born in Leinster. Very little is known of Halpin's early life, though it is known that his background was in the building trade rather than in engineering. In 1800, he was made the Inspector of Works for the Dublin Ballast Board (the predecessor to the Commissioners of Irish Lights), succeeding Francis Tunstall, and in this capacity was responsible for a number of works. One of these, the Bull Wall, along with associated projects, led to the creation of Bull Island in Dublin Bay, and enabled deep-draught ships to use the port for the first time.

Halpin was appointed the Inspector of Lighthouses in 1810. Between then and 1867 Irish lighthouses increased from fourteen to seventy-two under his direction. He established 53 new lighthouses, in addition to modernising a further 15: his projects included the Baily Lighthouse, the second Copeland Island Lighthouse, and the Skelligs Lighthouse. He also set up the Irish lighthouse service's administration and management procedures, regularised employment of lighthouse keepers, and continued to oversee the development of Dublin's port.

Alexander Basin in Dublin Port was previously known as "Halpin's Pool" or "Pond", and served as the Port's first permanent graving (dry) dock.

== Death and legacy ==
Halpin died on 8 July 1854 while carrying out lighthouse inspection duty. He was buried in Mount Jerome Cemetery, Dublin, with his grave stone recording he was 75 years old. He was succeeded as Inspector of Lighthouses by his son.

Halpin's Row, a former street in Dublin, was named for Halpin. Halpin's Row, also known as Buckingham Place, ran from Amiens Street to Sheriff Street Lower. It was truncated by the development of the railway line north from Connolly Station, and has since been in-filled with buildings facing onto Amiens Street. It was previously the site of a store for John Jameson & Son.

== See also ==
- Lighthouses in Ireland
