= Drumcondra, Dublin =

Drumcondra Droim Conrach (Irish)
- Inner suburb
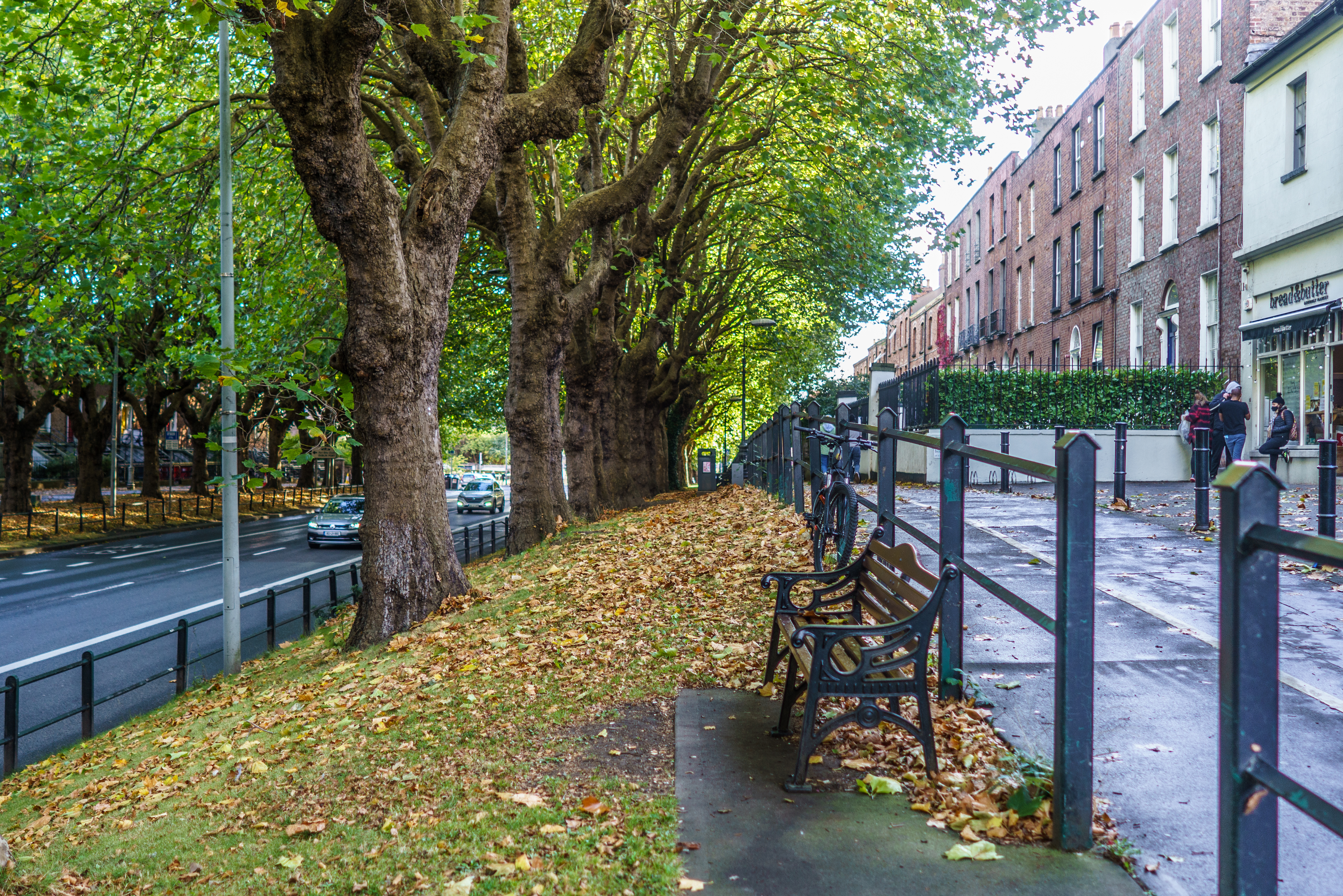
- Drumcondra Road Lower

- Location in Ireland
- Coordinates: 53.368°N 6.256°W
- Country: Ireland
- Province: Leinster
- County: County Dublin
- Local authority: Dublin City Council
- Elevation: 25 m (82 ft)

Population (2006)
  - Urban: 8,637
- Irish Grid Reference: O158368

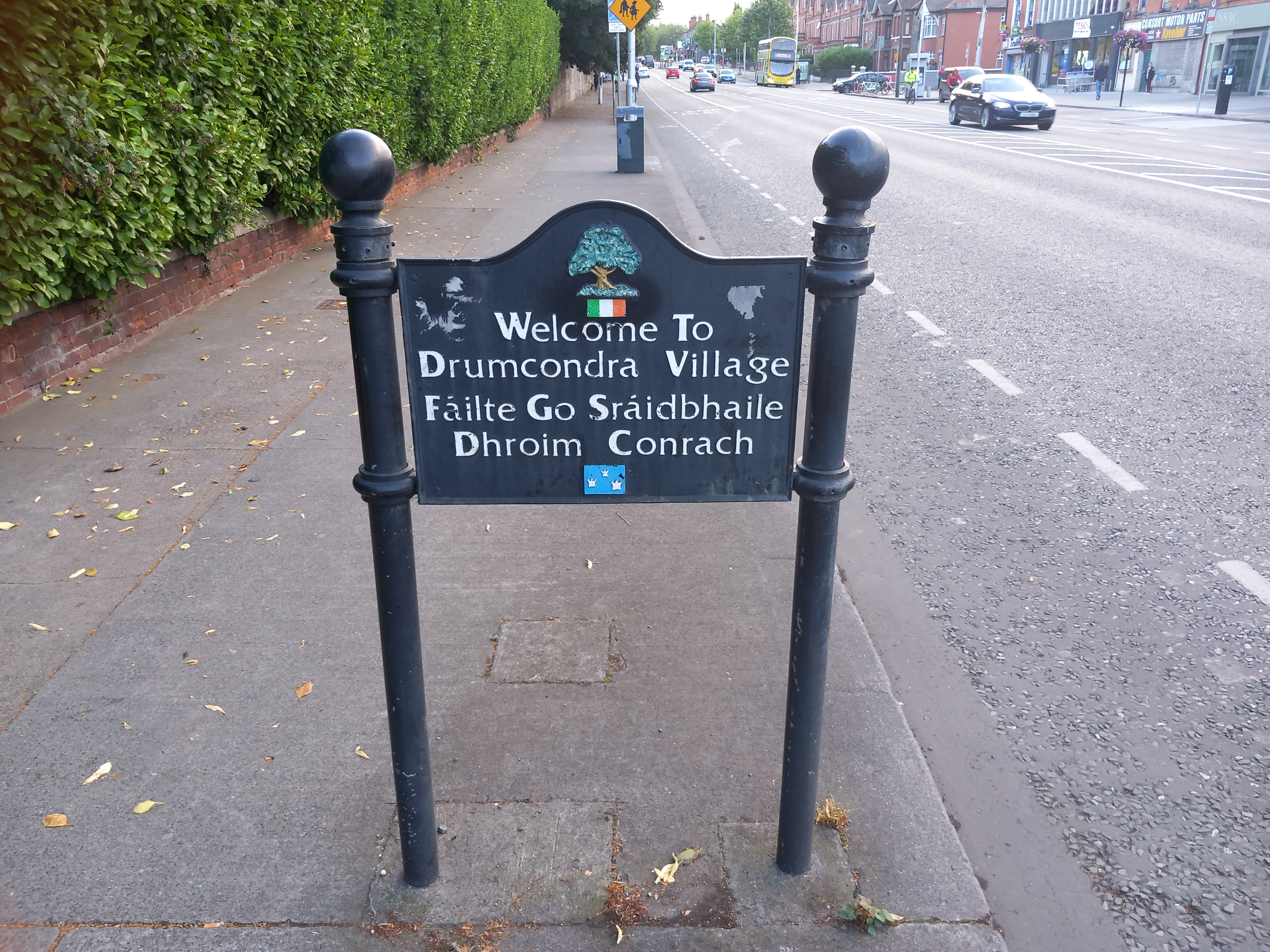
Welcome sign

Drumcondra (Irish: Droim Conrach, meaning 'Conra's Ridge') is a residential area and inner suburb on the Northside of Dublin, Ireland. It is administered by Dublin City Council. The River Tolka and the Royal Canal flow through the area.

== History ==
The village of Drumcondra was the central area of the civil parish of Clonturk, and the two names were used equally for the religious and civil parishes, but the modern suburban district of Drumcondra also encompasses the old Parish of St. Mary. Clonturk had been an alternative name for Drumcondra and the wider area for some time. In the middle ages, the area was farm land and primarily used by abbeys and other monastic institutions such as St Mary's Abbey and the Priory of the Trinity.

The southern stretch of the Slige Midluachra passed through Drumcondra and on into the City where it crossed the Liffey at a location known as the "ford of the hurdles". The present-day Drumcondra main road is built on top of the exact route the ancient highway took, the road was one of five ancient roads to meet at Tara, albeit in myth only; in reality, the five roads may have met at a point on the River Liffey in Dublin.

Richmond Road connects Fairview with Drumcondra on the northern side of the River Tolka and was laid out to provide access to Drumcondra Castle. The thoroughfare was a laneway until reputedly a jeweller and merchant called Francis Jacob Grose built a house called Richmond House in the mid-1700s, from which the road is thought to take its name. His house was on the site now occupied by St. Vincent's Hospital, Fairview. Kingston suggests that he named his house after Richmond, London. Grose's son was the antiquarian, Francis Grose, who is buried at Drumcondra Church. Richmond House was bought by the Daughters of Charity and incorporated into St Vincent's.

The Cat and Cage Pub, on the corner of Drumcondra Road and Church Avenue, was the site of an old postal stop and the point at which rebels, during the 1798 rebellion, seized a postal cart in order to signal to others in North County Dublin to revolt.

=== Housing ===
Ireland as a whole, and specifically Dublin, was experiencing a large housing crisis during the 19th century. As the city expanded, private development was built beyond the Royal Canal between Phibsboro and the North Strand, towards what became Saint Mobhi road; including much Alexander Strain built houses. However, it was only in the late 19th and early 20th century that local authorities began to take action to actively plan housing development.

==== Drumcondra's Development Scheme ====
Dublin Corporation purchased what was former farming land west of St Patrick's teacher training College. The bulk of the purchased land serviced by Dublin Corporation was developed as a tenant purchase project in c. 1928; mirroring a nearby, larger project in Marino and 'The Tenters' in Dublin City. Roads in the new triangle shaped estate were named after a popular Archbishop of Dublin William Walsh, but mostly Irish language scholars and historians such as James Hardiman, Samuel Ferguson, John Windele, David Comyn and Patrick Joyce. The area north of here was sold to private developers, Building Societies and Trusts including the Irish Sailors and Soldiers Land Trust who built housing development on Home Farm Road and Griffith Avenue in the early 1930s.

The Irish Sailors and Soldiers Land Trust was created originally in order to generate housing for ex-servicemen, often WWI veterans. There were 20 separate housing schemes across the county of Dublin. Drumcondra was one of the top 3 major schemes they took on with 66 dwellings as part of the scheme. Although the size does not compare to that of Killester, its housing scheme was better integrated into the neighbouring development projects. The housing built by the ISSLT in Drumcondra was constructed on the land provided and serviced by Dublin Corporation, forming part of a 'Reserved Area' north of the Dublin Corporation's housing scheme. The ISSLT purchased four and a half acres of the Drumcondra Reserved Area for its housing scheme. These houses built along what is now known as Lambay Road are conventional in design and built in blocks of four with some semi-detached cottages. These houses have extensive gardens in the front and back of each and look similar and therefore blend in with those of the Reserved Area scheme already set out by the Corporation. The ISSLT's identity is clearly marked in Drumcondra by plaques displayed on houses through Lambay Road.

=== Local government and subdivisions ===
The Drumcondra, Clonliffe, and Glasnevin Township Act 1878 was a local act of the Westminster Parliament, sponsored by businessmen in Drumcondra, and created a township called Drumcondra, Clonliffe and Glasnevin, encompassing Drumcondra and the neighbouring districts of Clonliffe and Glasnevin, governed by a body of town commissioners. The portion of the district electoral division of Drumcondra outside the township was renamed Drumcondra Rural. The Dublin Corporation Act 1900 (63 & 64 Vict. c. cclxiv) absorbed the township into the county borough of Dublin as the wards of Drumcondra and Glasnevin. Part of Drumcondra Rural district electoral division was transferred to the city in 1931. The remainder was split into Drumcondra Rural Number One and Drumcondra Rural Number Two in 1971.

== Transport ==
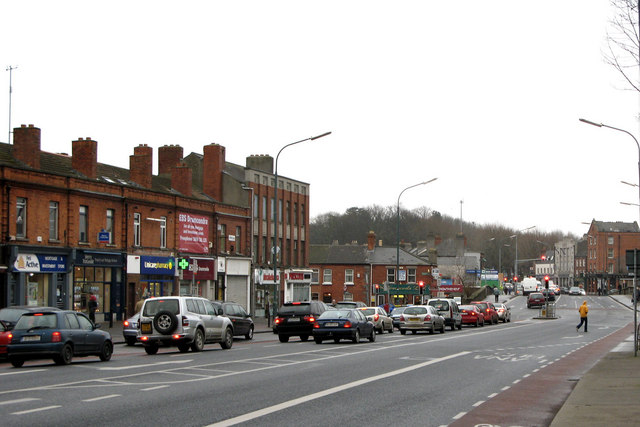
Drumcondra Road Upper

The area is served by Drumcondra railway station, on the main Drumcondra Road. This station initially opened on 1 April 1901 but closed on 1 December 1910 with the termination of Kingsbridge (now Heuston Station) to Amiens Street (now Connolly Station) services. Part of the original building was demolished in late 1918. It reopened on 2 March 1998 as a station on the Maynooth/Longford commuter line.

Several Dublin Bus routes serve the Drumcondra area, including the 1, 16, 19, 33, 41 and 41C. In addition, several private operators operate on what is a main approach road into the city centre, including Aircoach express coach service to Dublin Airport stops at the railway station.

== Features ==
One of the main sights of Dublin is Croke Park, where Ireland's national games of Gaelic football and hurling may be seen. It has a capacity of 82,300 people, it is one of the largest sports stadiums in Europe. 'Croker' (as it is colloquially known) is the headquarters of the Gaelic Athletic Association and also houses the official GAA Museum on St Josephs Avenue, off Clonliffe Road. The stadium hosts the finals of the All-Ireland Senior Football Championship and All-Ireland Senior Hurling Championship. The stadium is a 20-minute walk from Dublin city centre or a 5-minute bus ride.

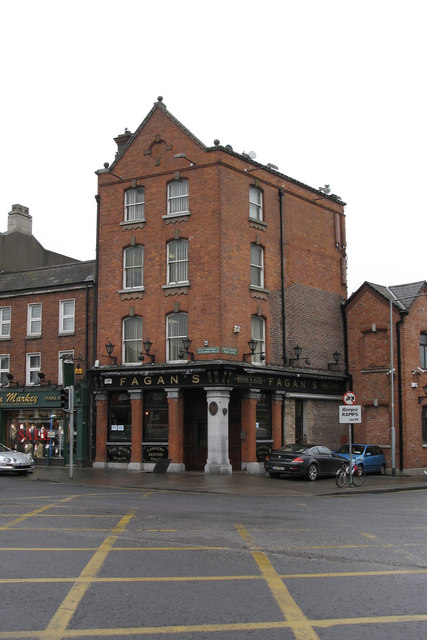
Fagan's Public House, Drumcondra Road Lower

Fagan's Public House, Drumcondra Road Lower, where Bertie Ahern took U.S. President Bill Clinton in September 1998. Kennedys Pub on Lower Drumcondra Road is one of the oldest pubs in Drumcondra, predating Fagans by a number of years. Formerly called McPhillips, it has been named Kennedys since 1961.

Tolka Park, the home of League of Ireland side Shelbourne since 1989, is situated on Richmond Road. The site has been used as a soccer pitch since the 1920s, initially by Drumcondra Football Club (Drums) and from 1972 by Home Farm Football Club.

The National Council for the Blind of Ireland (NCBI) at Whitworth Road was previously Drumcondra Hospital and is located adjoining the cemetery of St. George's, whose former parish church is located at Temple Street.

== Notable buildings ==
=== Belvidere House ===
Belvidere House, formerly the home of the Coghill family, this late 17th-century building became the residence of the Superior General of the Irish Christian Brothers, and a training centre for the order, in 1874. The house was bought by the Coghills in the early 1700s when it was known as Drishogue. In 1881, the Congregation bought and moved to Marino House, and sold Belvidere House to Cardinal Cullen. St Patrick's College, Dublin, which had been founded in 1875 at 2 Drumcondra Road Lower, relocated to Belvidere House in 1883. New college buildings were constructed, while the house became the residence of the Vincentian Fathers who ran the college. It now provides offices and meeting rooms for the St Patrick's Campus of Dublin City University, into which the former college was incorporated in 2016.

=== Clonturk House ===
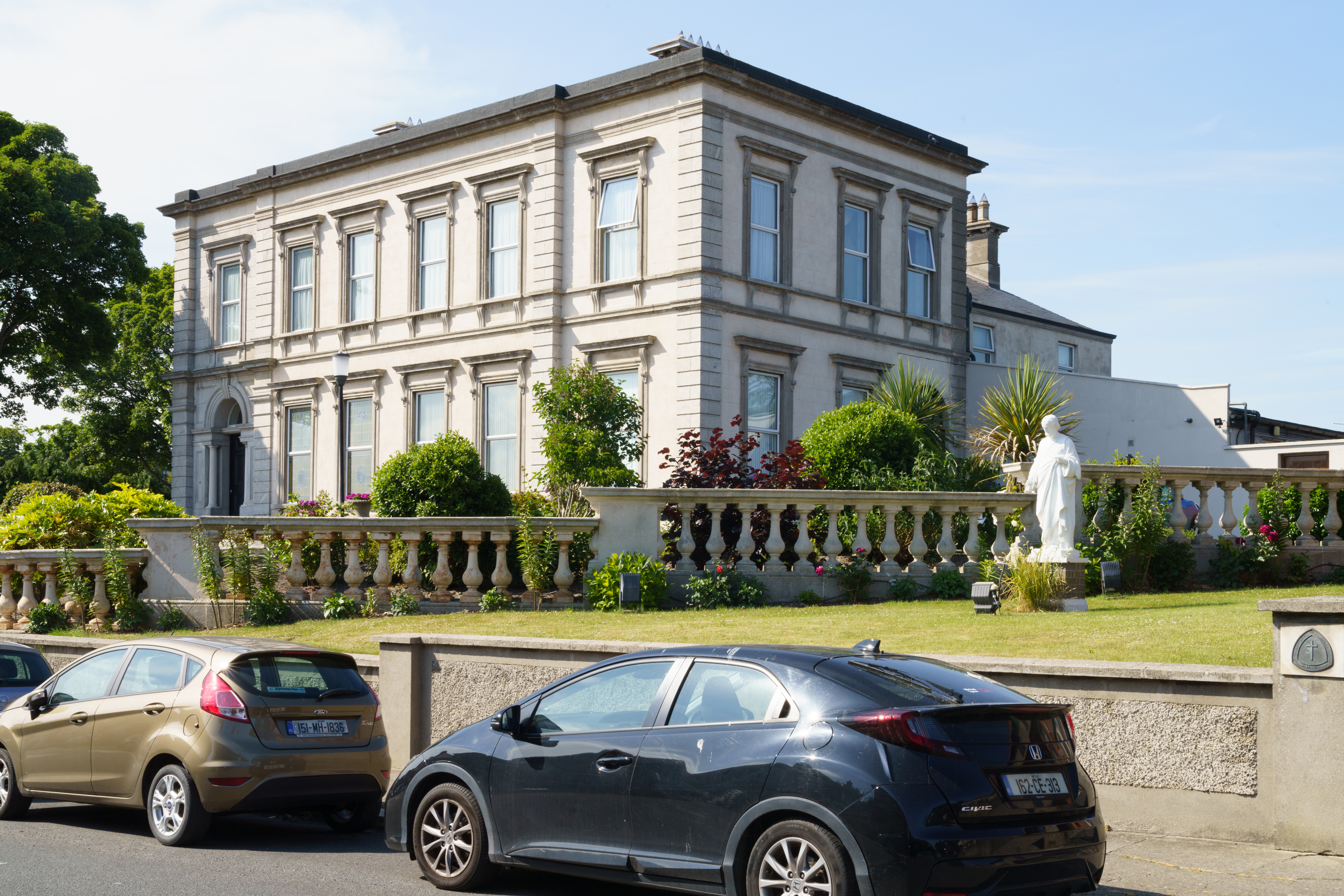
Clonturk House, Drumcondra

Clonturk House on Ormond Road was built prior to 1820, although its current appearance owes much to its renovation in 1880, at which time the stone balustrades from James Gandon's Carlisle Bridge (O'Connell Bridge) were moved to Clonturk by its owner. In the early twentieth century it moved from private residential to institutional use, initially as the Ormond Commercial School for Boys and subsequently as a female orphanage run by the Presbyterian Church. In 1959 it was purchased by the Rosminian Fathers as a home for blind men. Well-known Dublin character Thomas Dudley ("Bang Bang") was a resident until his death in 1980.

=== Drumcondra Castle ===
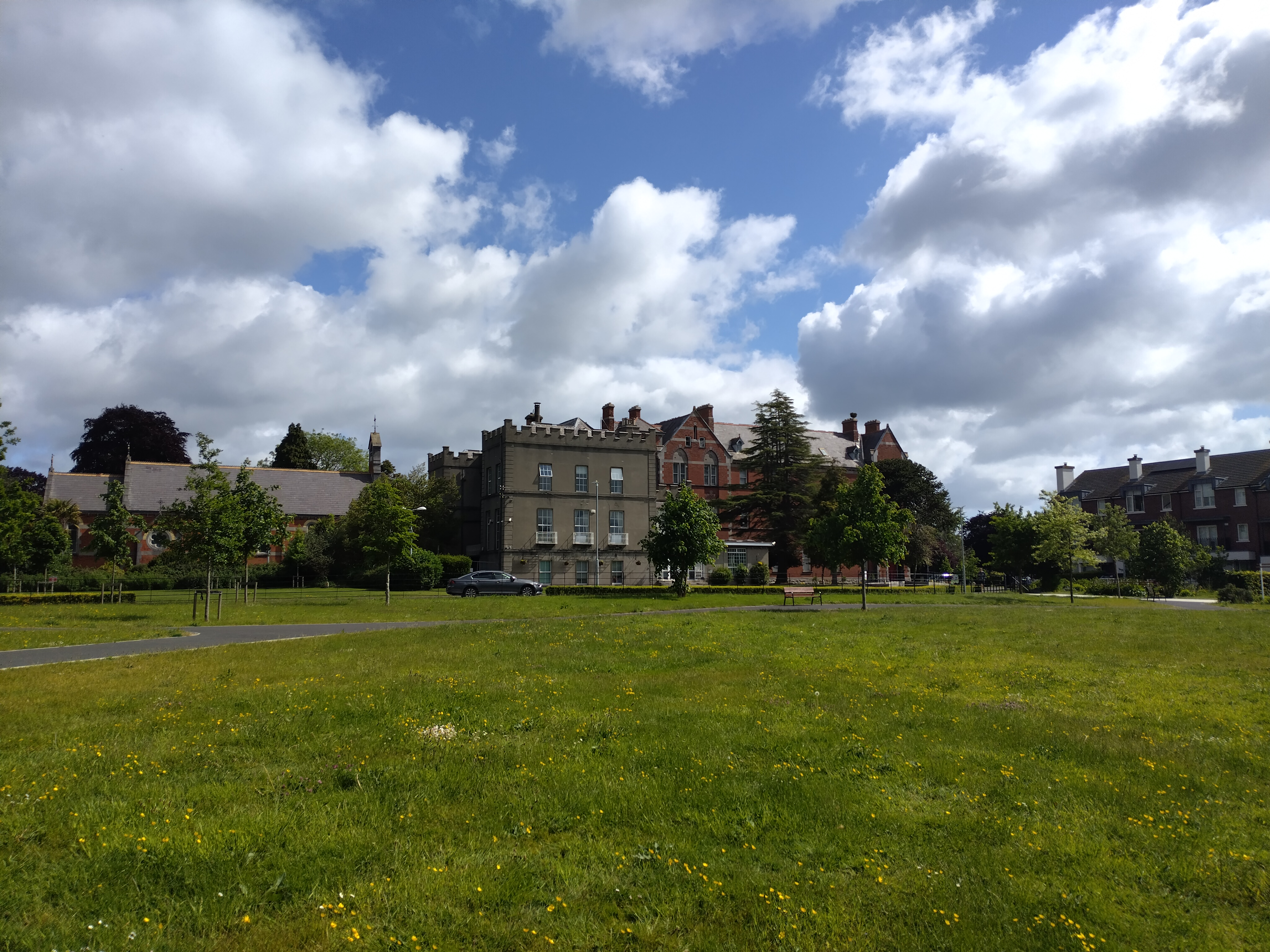
St Joseph's, also known as Drumcondra Castle, as seen from a small park in the housing estate, Grace Park Woods

Originally the site of an Elizabethan castle built circa 1560, the castle was built by Meath man James Bathe on ecclesiastical land (belonging to the Priory of the Holy Trinity), granted to him. It was owned for many years by the Bathe family. In 1591, when the Castle was the residence of Sir William Warren, who had married the widow of John Bathe, thus acquiring the lands in Drumcondra for his lifetime. Hugh O'Neill, Earl of Tyrone married his third wife Mabel Bagenal here after he had eloped with her.

In 1677, James II granted the Drumcondra property to a Giles Martin and in 1703 it was purchased by Captain Chichester Philips. In 1870 it became St. Joseph's Asylum for the Male Blind when the Carmelites bought the lands of Drumcondra Castle. The Rosminians were appointed by the Archbishop of Dublin to run services for the Blind in St. Joseph's, Drumcondra in 1955. The School and wider services located there have been known as ChildVision since 2012. In 2014 the Rosminian order sold the lands in St. Joseph's, but took out a 25-year lease on the houses and buildings which it will use for ChildVision. The Grace Park Woods housing estate was built on the former St. Joseph's lands.

=== Drumcondra House ===
Drumcondra House was purchased by Rev. John Hand and in 1842 All Hallows College was established. Daniel O'Connell played a part in the purchase of Drumcondra House for All Hallows, from Dublin Corporation. Designed by the architect Sir Edward Lovett Pearce and was built in 1726 for Sir Marmaduke Coghill, from the nearby Belvedere House. The Coghills rented out the house for a time. All Hallows was sold to Dublin City University by the Vincentian Order in 2016.

=== Hampton Lodge/Carmelite Convent ===
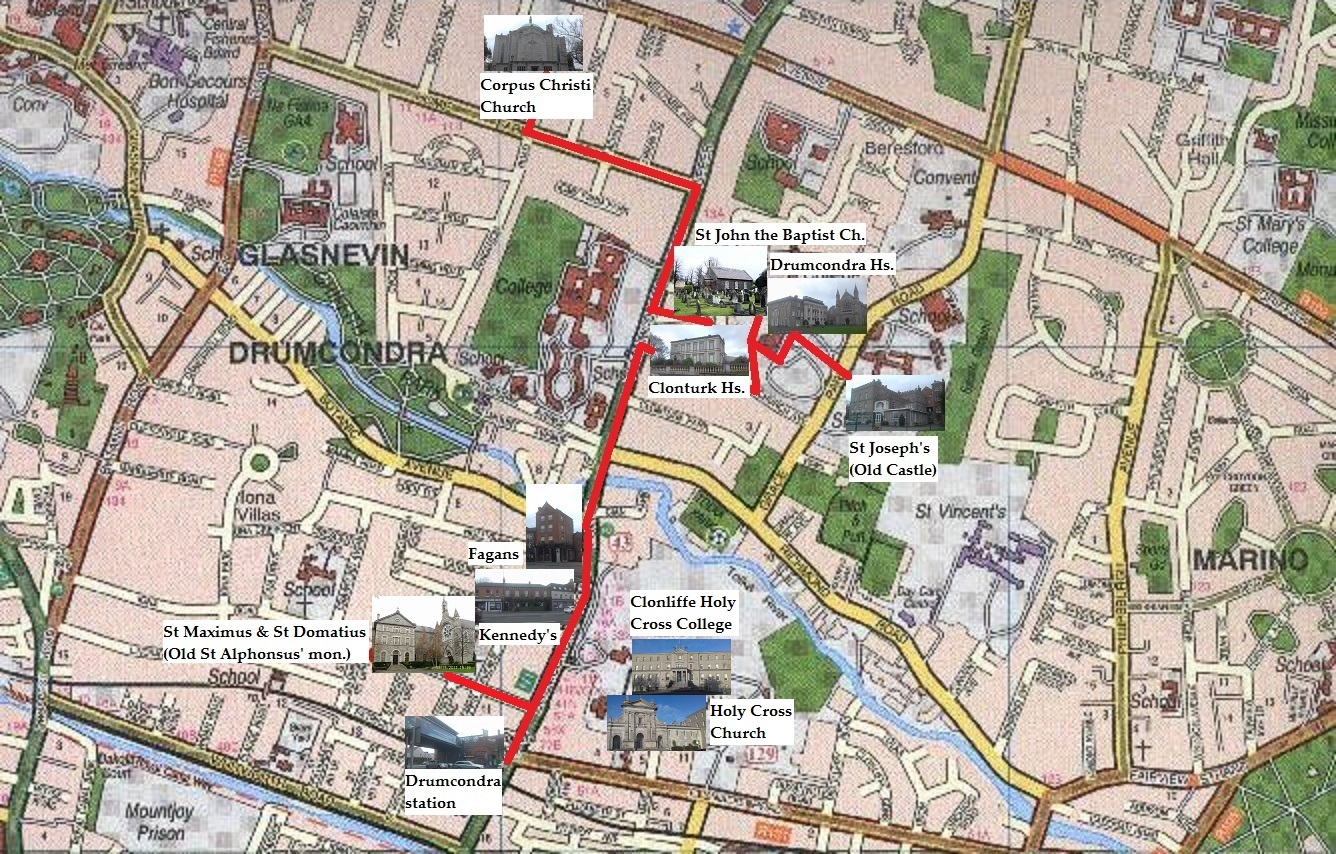
Map of Drumcondra with notable buildings

For 150 years Hampton House and its lands held the Carmelite Monastery of the Incarnation on Grace Park Road, housing members of this enclosed order of nuns. The order, which had been based in Blanchardstown, purchased Hampton House and moved in during 1858. Prior to it being a convent, Hampton Lodge was the residence of Thomas Williams, the first secretary of the Bank of Ireland, and his wife Mary Ann Williams; their son Richard Williams lived in Drumcondra Castle. The land and buildings were sold by the order in 2016 and were redeveloped as houses and a nursing home.

=== Distillery ===
A distillery, the Dublin Whiskey Distillers (D.W.D.), was founded in the 1870s on the banks of the River Tolka, and known as the Jones Road Distillery (Distillery Road is a continuation of Jones Road). The distillery closed in 1946 and the property was sold. A number of buildings were built and are still standing and a number of buildings although redeveloped retain the names connected with the distillery such as The Corn Mill, The Granary, The Grainstore and Distillery Lofts.

== Education ==
=== Primary schools ===
- Drumcondra N.S. (for boys and girls), Church Avenue, Church Of Ireland.
- St Patrick's N.S. (Co-Ed), Roman Catholic, parish of Drumcondra.
- Corpus Christi N.S. (Co-Ed), Home Farm Road, Roman Catholic, parish of Drumcondra.
- Grace Park Educate Together N.S, contained on the All Hallow's campus of Dublin City University (DCU).
- St. Joseph's School For Children with a Visual Impairment, (Co-Ed), Roman Catholic, parish of Drumcondra.

=== Secondary schools ===
- Dominican College Griffith Avenue (Girls)
- PobalScoil Rosmini (mixed)
- Maryfield College (Girls)

=== Third level ===
Two campuses of Dublin City University are located in Drumcondra:

- All Hallows College
- St Patrick's College, Dublin

== Religion ==
The oldest church in the district is Drumcondra Church (Church of Ireland), located at the end of Church Avenue, abutting All Hallows College. Several notable people including Georgian-period architect James Gandon are buried in the adjoining graveyard.

The "Old Church of St. George" was built about 1668 in Lower Temple Street (changed to Hill Street in the 1800s), then a part of Drumcondra. The Tower of the Old Church of St. George can still be seen on Hill Street and its gravestones are around the walls of what is now a playground.

The "New Church of St. George" was built on the square further up the road at the end of Temple Street in the early 1800s. The original site acquired for the new church was on Whitworth Road, but then the present site was selected, which at the time was open fields. A temporary chapel was built on the Whitworth Road site and its churchyard was retained when St. George's was completed – this site was later taken over by the Whitworth Hospital (later named Drumcondra Hospital). The gravestones can be seen behind the hospital.

Drumcondra is a parish in the Fingal South West deanery of the Roman Catholic Archdiocese of Dublin, served by the Church of Corpus Christi at Home Farm Road and St. Columba’s Catholic Church on Iona Road.

The palace of the Roman Catholic Archbishop of Dublin is situated alongside Clonliffe College (the former diocesan seminary). Together they occupy an extensive site bounded by Clonliffe Road and Drumcondra Road (to the South and West) with the River Tolka at the northern extremity; long proposed for housing development.

The Respond! Housing Association has its Dublin office located in High Park, Drumcondra, a former 'Mother and Baby Home', where it also runs training courses in Housing and Social care provision.

The Ukrainian Greek Catholic Church (Ukrainian Church in Ireland of Bishop Nicholas the Miracle Worker) holds services in Holy Cross College, Clonliffe.

== Graveyards/cemeteries ==
There are a number of small burial places in the Drumcondra area

- All Hallows College Cemetery
- Cemetery of the Carmelite Monastery of the Incarnation, Hampton, Drumcondra.
- Drumcondra Church Graveyard
- St. George Burial ground, Drumcondra Hospital Whitworth Road
- High Park, Graveyard
- St. Joseph's Cemetery (Rosminians), Grace Park Road.

== Sport ==
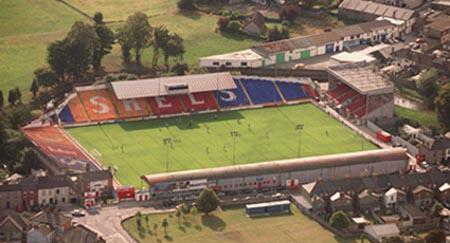
Tolka Park in Drumcondra

Drumcondra is home to Croke Park and Tolka Park soccer stadium, the permanent home of Shelbourne F.C. since 1989, 'The Reds' have hosted major European clubs such as Panathinaikos and Steaua Bucharest in the Drumcondra venue. The club has won the league seven times and the FAI Cup four times since moving to Tolka Park. The ground was also the base for Drumcondra F.C. (Drums) which was a League of Ireland club from 1928 to 1972 before it was merged with fellow Dublin club Home Farm, now based in nearby Whitehall. Drumcondra FC, who played their home games at Tolka Park stadium, was a successful side in the post World War II years, winning five Irish league titles between 1948 and 1965 as well as competing in the European Cup and Inter-Cities Fairs Cup on several occasions.

The name lives on today in the shape of Drumcondra FC.

The Ierne Sports and Social Club is situated off Grace Park Road.

Rosmini Gaels (GAA) is based in Drumcondra; but area would also fall under the large catchment area of Na Fianna GAA club.

== Notable people ==
- Bertie Ahern, Iar Taoiseach
- Sarah Atkinson, writer and philanthropist, lived for thirty years on Drumcondra Hill
- William Bathe SJ, the Jesuit priest, musicologist and writer, was born in Drumcondra Castle.
- Dermot Bannon, Architect on RTE 'Room to Improve', lives in Drumcondra.
- Dermot Bolger, writer
- Brendan Bracken, a British wartime cabinet member, lived for part of his childhood in the area.
- Richard Bruton, former Fine Gael politician.
- Éamonn Ceannt, Nationalist, lived in Drumcondra from late childhood to the 1916 Rising.
- Nevill Coghill, Victoria Cross recipient
- Emmet Dalton, soldier and film producer
- Neil Delamere, comedian
- Pauline Delaney, actress
- Eamon Dunphy, football player and broadcaster, lived on Richmond Road.
- Gabriel Fallon, Abbey actor
- Michael Feeney Callan, writer
- Jim Fitzpatrick, artist
- Charles Franklin, motorcycle racer and designer
- Orla Gartland, popular singer
- Aidan Gillen, actor
- Alan Glynn, writer
- Eoin Hand, football player and manager
- Paul Harrington, Lyricist and singer, Eurovision winner.
- Michael Holohan, composer, member and former chair of Aosdána.
- James Joyce, writer, lived for a time on Millbourne Avenue.
- Richard Kirwan, scientist
- Nuala McGovern, broadcaster/journalist
- Samantha Mumba, singer
- Seán O'Casey, playwright, grew up on what was then referred to as Drumcondra but would today be considered Dorset Street.
- Peadar O'Donnell (1893–1986), Irish socialist republican revolutionary, lived at 174 Upper Drumcondra Road
- Mary O'Kelly de Galway an Irish Belgian resistance operative, grew up in Waterfall Cottage, Richmond Road
- Anthony O'Reilly, businessman and rugby player, grew up on Griffith Avenue
- Fintan O'Toole, journalist
- Rejjie Snow, rapper
- Thomas Tickell, poet
- Hannah Tyrrell, Dublin GAA and Irish Rugby player

== See also ==
- List of towns and villages in Ireland
- Griffith Park
- St. Anne's Road Pocket Park
- Drumcondra Public Library
