= Home Farm Road =

Regional road in Dublin, Ireland

- Location within Dublin
- Native name: Bothar na Buaile (Irish)
- Former name: St. Mary's Road
- Namesake: home farm of the Priory of the Most Holy Trinity
- Length: 872 m (2,861 ft)
- Width: 17 metres (56 ft)
- Location: Drumcondra, Dublin, Ireland
- Postal code: D09
- Coordinates: 53.374778°N 6.2585378°W
- west end: St Mobhi Road
- east end: Drumcondra Road Upper

Home Farm Road (Irish: Bóthar na Buaile), also referred to as Homefarm Road, is a regional road situated in upper Drumcondra, Dublin, Ireland. It is notable for being the place of origin of Home Farm F.C. It was previously named St. Mary's Road up to the tenth house.

The road is named after the medieval home farm of the Priory of the Most Holy Trinity, which was located in Glasnevin.

== Route ==
It runs for approximately 872 m (about half a mile) from Drumcondra Road Upper to Mobhi Road and has seven side streets: Arran Road, Achill Road, Clare Road, Valentia Road, Bantry Road, Lambay Road, Rathlin Road all named after islands around Ireland. Ferguson and Walsh Roads were named after an Irish scholar and former Archbishop of Dublin respectively.

In 1920 the residence of Professor John Carolan and his family was at "Fernside", 37 Upper Drumcondra Road, around the corner from Home Farm Road. On the night of 20 October 1920, Dan Breen and Seán Treacy were staying here with the Carolan family as they evaded the 'G' men of the Dublin Metropolitan Police (DMP). Around 1.00 a.m. the house was raided by a large force of DMP and British Army members, complete with armoured cars. Professor Carolan let this raiding party in, was questioned and then shot dead in his own hallway. Breen and Treacy fired off their weapons, killing several soldiers. They then jumped out a side window of the house and fell through the conservatory roof, sustaining many cuts. They made their way into the Home Farm Fields. The Home Farm stretched from the back of the house over to Mobhi Road where they evaded capture by the DMP and Crown forces, Treacy going to an address at Inchicore Road and Breen to a safe house at Finglas. Breen was eventually brought to the Mater Hospital for treatment and the nuns there hid him from the authorities. Treacy left Inchicore one week later and made his way to Talbot Street, but was shot dead there by the British forces.

The British overreacted at Drumcondra that night and the machine-gunner on the armoured car panicked and let off a few bursts of gunfire at the house, killing and injuring some of his own. A Dublin Fire Brigade man (Joe Connolly, who later became Chief) who responded on an ambulance to the incident, said that twelve bodies were removed that night to the Military Hospital.

== Amenities ==
Amenities include the 2,000 seater Corpus Christi Catholic Church (opened in 1941), and the associated Corpus Christi National School. There was a pharmacy on the road for many years, called Homepharm (recently closed), and there is an independent convenience store and a hairdresser called 'New Image'. The road is served by the Number 19 Dublin Bus route which runs from Dublin Airport to Merrion Square.

Its many famous past residents include the legendary uilleann piper and folklore collector, Seamus Ennis, who - in his later years - shared a flat there with the great Clare accordion player, Tony MacMahon. Ennis's stay on Home Farm Road is celebrated in a poem entitled 'Seamus Ennis in Drumcondra', by Dermot Bolger.

== See also ==
- Drumcondra, Dublin
- Dublin
- Na Fianna GAA
- Home Farm F.C.
- Regional road
- Roads in Ireland
