= Room to Improve =

Irish TV series

- Genre: Makeover
- Created by: Coco Content
- Directed by: Luke McManus
- Starring: Dermot Bannon
- Country of origin: Ireland
- Original language: English
- No. of series: 17
- No. of episodes: 100+

Production
- Executive producer: Linda Cullen
- Producer: Hilary O'Donovan
- Cinematography: Piaras MacCionnaith, Andrew Cummins
- Editor: Stephen Vickers

Original release
- Network: RTÉ One
- Release: 20 June 2007 – present

Room to Improve is an Irish architectural renovation TV series broadcast on RTÉ One. It is also broadcast on the UK's Home channel.

== Format ==
Presented by the architect Dermot Bannon, his aim is to improve his clients' living conditions by renovating their homes without spending excessive sums of money. The budgets differ for each client, ranging from €20,000 to €250,000.

Bannon's architectural designs frequently include box-shaped extensions with large windows and interior 'courtyard' gardens. He favours open-plan interior layouts and spacious rooms and he generally seeks to maximise the penetration of natural light into the plans, but introduces several new steps into the layout. He has a keen interest in gardens and outdoor space and his designs usually provide access to these outdoor spaces and make the most of any views. He has a love of natural materials and often uses timber in kitchens. He has a dislike of fussy ornamentation and ostentatious "bling" and a strong preference for restraint and simplicity. His strong opinions on decor often brings him into conflict with his clients. Bannon is renowned for acting as house hold items such as "I'm the oven" and "I'm the toilet".

Room To Improve often features candid coverage of disagreements or problems on site and presents a "warts and all" picture of the realities of managing a building project.

== Broadcasts ==
From 17 May 2021 Room to Improve was broadcast in a lunchtime slot during the week on the UK's Channel 5, after they had licensed series 8 to 12 from RTÉ. Series 1 began transmission on the same channel commencing Thursday 8 July 2021.

== Episode list ==
=== Series 1 ===
The first series had six episodes.

Date	Details	Location	Budget	Circumstances
20 June 2007	Original Archive	Killiney	€20,000	Complete remodelling of entire downstairs of a two-bedroomed home
27 June 2007	Original Archive	Glasnevin	€40,000	Entire downstairs in need of wheelchair accessibility due to client's multiple sclerosis
4 July 2007	Original Archive	Castleknock	€50,000	Renovation of dark, dismal, north facing, uninsulated, cold extension used as a kitchen, dining and homework area
11 July 2007	Original Archive	Enniscorthy	€65,000	Renovation of an old 1850s cottage in preparation for a new baby
18 July 2007	Original Archive	Dalkey		Renovation of a dark, cold and unviewable kitchen
25 July 2007	Original Archive	Ballygarrett		Creating a kitchen, dining room and spare bedroom without losing the cottage's 1930s charm

=== Series 2 ===
The second series had eight episodes.

Date	Details	Location	Budget	Circumstances
4 June 2008	Original Archive	Donnycarney	€30,000	Improving an ex-council house
11 June 2008	Original Archive	Timahoe	€60,000	Overcrowded house
18 June 2008	Original Archive	Ennis	€70,000	Family unable to eat at the same table and to watch TV comfortably together
25 June 2008	Original Archive	Clontarf	€80,000	More rooms required
2 July 2008	Original Archive	South Circular Road	€120,000	Improve a Victorian house including the demolition of three unsightly extensions
9 July 2008	Original Archive	Edenderry	€60,000	Improve previous disastrous planning
16 July 2008	Original Archive	Rathfarnham	€150,000	Client has multiple sclerosis
23 July 2008	Original Archive	Ballinteer	€80,000	Running out of space

=== Series 3 ===
The third series had eight episodes.

Date	Details	Location	Budget	Circumstances
3 June 2009	Original Archive	Artane, Dublin 5	€35,000	Solving the problems remaining following an unsuccessful renovation. Creating a family kitchen/living area.
10 June 2009	Original Archive	Enniskerry	€90,000	Full refit of house and maximising the view of Glencree and the Sugarloaf mountain.
17 June 2009	Original Archive	Killiney	€70,000	Creating a "bungalow downstairs" for Tommy whose mobility has been impaired by MS.
24 June 2009	Original Archive	Whitehall, Dublin 9	€90,000	Redesigning the rear of the house, which contained "the worst room I've ever seen"
1 July 2009	Original Archive	Rathcoole	€100,000	Create a space that is insulated from the sound of the busy M7 motorway
8 July 2009	Original Archive	Knocktopher	€65,000	Create a new living area beyond the kitchen.
15 July 2009	Original Archive	Stoneybatter, Dublin 7	€90,000	Extending a very cramped urban cottage
22 July 2009	Original Archive	Templetuohy	€100,000	Improving the quality of the family living spaces

Christmas Special (2009)

A Room To Improve For Christmas

Date	Details	Location	Budget	Circumstances
23 December 2009	Original Archive	Ratoath	€70,000	Transform a bungalow that dominated by the abandoned industrial unit to the rear into an elegant home for one that can also accommodate a whole family of visitors.

=== Series 4 ===
The fourth series had eight episodes.

Date	Details	Location	Budget	Circumstances
5 May 2010	Original Archive	Foxrock	€200,000	Sisters Margaret and Jodie Burke want to renovate the home in Foxrock that they grew up in.
12 May 2010	Original Archive	Clonakilty	€100,000	A couple living in a cramped remote hilltop cottage in West Cork need a bigger living space.
19 May 2010	Original Archive	Laytown	€60,000	A family of five live in a cottage they have now outgrown and need to extend, but the problem is that the property is built on at least four levels with some shoddy workmanship during ad hoc extensions. Dermot's job is to level the whole house.
26 May 2010	Original Archive	Dalkey	€180,000	A three-bedroom home is cramped, dark has very little privacy on the estate the house is located on. Dermot's task is to extend the house and rearrange the layout to make the house bright and spacious.
2 June 2010	Original Archive	Clontarf	€95,000	
9 June 2010	Original Archive	Tullow	€150,000	
16 June 2010	Original Archive	Dundalk		
7 July 2010	Original Archive	Sutton	€170,000	

=== Series 5 ===
The fifth series had six episodes.

Date	Details	Location	Budget	Circumstances
Wednesday 14 September 2011	Original Archive	Cork (city)	€140,000	Restoration and extension of derelict 1930s dormer bungalow
Wednesday 21 September 2011	Original Archive	Legan	€80,000	Dermot renovates housing accommodation attached to a local pub in Legan.
Wednesday 28 September 2011	Original Archive	Wicklow	€120,000, then €150,000	A remote tiny 100-year-old ex-council cottage in the Wicklow Gap is damp and mouldy and is no longer suitable for a family of five and modern day life.
Wednesday 5 October 2011	Original Archive	Dundrum	€190,000	A family rebuild and extend their cottage built in 1914 by their great grandparents.
Wednesday 12 October 2011	Original Archive	Dalkey	€250,000	
Wednesday 19 October 2011	Original Archive	Blackrock	€160,000	

=== Series 6 ===
The sixth series had four episodes.

Date	Details	Location	Budget	Circumstances
Sunday 14 October 2012	Original Archive	Tipperary	€180,000	
2012	Original Archive	Bishopstown		
2012	Original Archive	Finglas		
2012	Original Archive	Donnybrook		

Christmas special (2012)

Tallaght's National Children's Hospital commissions Bannon to create a playground and garden.

=== Series 7 ===
The seventh series had six episodes.

Date	Details	Location	Budget	Circumstances
Sunday 17 November 2013	Original Archive	Mullingar	€250,000	A widow and her daughter want to move out of their huge 13 bedroom former B&B and move into another house they own, a 3-bedroom bungalow that hasn't been occupied since her husband died.
Sunday 24 November 2013	Original Archive	Clane	Final budget €185,000	With the pressure of a tiny budget of €150,000, a totally unrealistic schedule and two headstrong clients in Eilín and David who want to manage the entire project themselves while holding down full-time jobs, this is Dermot's most challenging and frustrating build to date.
Sunday 1 December 2013	Original Archive	Brittas	€160,000	Dermot is in Brittas with Irish politician Senator Katherine Zappone and her partner of 30 years Ann Louise Gilligan. The couple live in a now dilapidated 100-year-old hunting lodge which is in desperate need of renovation
Sunday 8 December 2013	Original Archive	Killawalla	€150,000	A family of four have outgrown their tiny cottage and need a remodel and an extension.
Sunday 15 December 2013	Original Archive	Firhouse	€150,000	A family of six live in a large 15-room two-storey property with a warren of disconnected rooms, half of which are never used. They need help turn their huge house into one big spacious fully functional dream home.
Sunday 22 December 2013	Original Archive	Stillorgan	Final budget €120,000	A couple live in a compact 1950's bungalow. The house has to be completely redesigned and Dermot has just €90,000 to complete their wish list

=== Series 8 ===
There were eight episodes in series 8.

Date	Details	Location	Budget	Circumstances
25 January 2015		Dun Laoghaire	€260,000	A couple couldn't afford to buy a proper house as they were too expensive, so they went back to basics and bought a disused commercial lockup in Dun Laoghaire to turn into their first home.
1 February 2015		Kilternan	€360,000	A couple have bought a 19th-century listed former Church of Ireland schoolhouse in Kilternan which they wish to turn into a dream 21st century home.
8 February 2015		Baltinglass	€160,000	Recently engaged Larry McGrath and Elaine O'Neill live in bungalow on a large dairy farm in Baltinglass, Wicklow. Dermot has been called in to blend the warmth of a traditional farmhouse with the flexibility of a modern urban design.
15 February 2015		Malahide	€130,000	Redesign a house for a 12-year-old child who uses a wheelchair.
22 February 2015		Mullingar	€250,000	Modernise and enlarge a 1970s outdated and cold home outside Mullingar in Westmeath for a family of six.
1 March 2015		Portmarnock		
8 March 2015		Nenagh		
15 March 2015		Dundrum		

=== Series 9 ===
There were five episodes in series 9.

Date	Details	Location	Budget	Circumstances
Sunday, 7 February 2016	Original	Puckaun, County Tipperary	€200,000	Remodeling of the inside of a '60s bungalow situated in the heart of the village to include two separate living spaces for a mother and son – with his family.
14 February 2016	`	Drogheda		
21 February 2016		Baldoyle		
28 February 2016		Maynooth		
6 March 2016		Three favourite builds		

=== Series 10 ===
Series 10 has six episodes.

Date	Details	Location	Budget	Circumstances
2017	Amazon Prime Season Ten	Malahide	€180,000	Robbie and Julie from North Darndale in Dublin saved for 20 years to buy their dream house – a 1940s cottage in the North Dublin Suburbs.
2017	Amazon Prime Schedule	Rush on Irish Coast	€260,000	Farmer and Boatbuilder Enda and his wife Mags retire from Brussels Sprout Farm to move home to picturesque seaside village.
2017		Moate	€250,000	Irish Gaelic football star Dessie Dolan and wife Kelly, who are both teachers, turn a property on a dilapidated plot on the outskirts of the town of Moate in County Westmeath into a spectacular family home
2017		Sutton	€200,000	Married couple James and Hannah modernise and extend a 1960s suburban house owned by Hannah's parents and which she inherited after their deaths
2017		Kildalkey	€200,000	At Kildalkey in rural East Meath, Dermot Bannon renovates 'Cois Shruchan', a farmhouse and barn gifted to newly engaged childhood sweethearts David and Celine, a family home at one time by occupied by her Granny and Grandad.
2017		Templeogue	€153,000	Newlyweds Rosie and Keith want to modernise a typical 1970s cold, dark and uninsulated suburban housing estate semi-detached property which is in need of a radical modernisation.

=== Series 11 ===
There were seven episodes in series 11.

Date	Details	Location	Budget	Circumstances
Sunday, 18 February 2018	Original	Kincasslagh, County Donegal	€200,000	Singer Daniel O'Donnell's wife Majella upgrades and reconfigures their four-bed detached home in Kincasslagh, West Donegal.
Sunday, 25 February 2018	Original	Fermoy, County Cork	€650,000	Bannon has a large budget available to add a series of high end, modern extensions to a house in Fermoy, County Cork.
Sunday, 4 March 2018	Original	Clontarf, Dublin	Final budget €170,000 to €180,000	Bannon has only €130,000 to realise ambitious plans for a red brick terraced house in Clontarf, North Dublin.
Sunday, 11 March 2018	Original	Portrane, County Dublin	€250,000	An old cottage in Portrane on the north Dublin coast needs an upgrade to accommodate a three-generation family.
Sunday, 18 March 2018	Original	Killester, Dublin	Final budget €180,000	A couple have returned from London to Ireland after renovating a 1950s semi-detached house in Killester, North Dublin in an industrial style, with a budget of €150,000 to complete the project.
Sunday, 25 March 2018	Original	Tipperary	€220,000	A dairy farmer hopes to create a 'forever' home by renovating a recently inherited farmhouse on a half acre of land.
Sunday, 1 April 2018	Original	Stillorgan, Dublin	Final budget €300,000	Bannon has to bring 'Malibu style' living to a 1960s home in Stillorgan, Dublin, on a budget of €180,000, but rising to €290,000 due to client changes.

=== Series 12 ===
There were eight episodes in series 12.

Date	Location	Budget	Circumstances
8 September 2019	Athgarvan, County Kildare	Final budget €298,000	Nessa and David have bought a 1990s split level bungalow and have a budget of €290,000 to transform it into a modern extended dream home.
15 September 2019	Borrisoleigh, County Tipperary	€215,000	Dermot heads to Borrisoleigh, County Tipperary, to meet retired bakery salesman Joe Kenny who has lived in his bachelor pad since 1980. He is about to marry his long-term girlfriend Mary Hayes, but before they marry, Mary insists that the house needs to be dragged into the 21st century.
22 September 2019	Rathfarnham, Dublin	Final budget €390,000	Dermot Bannon travels to Rathfarnham to meet a couple who live with their daughter in their detached 1930s two-bedroom home, and he helps the family transform and extend it on a budget of €285,000.
29 September 2019	Ashford County Wicklow.	Final budget €375,000 plus €195,000 on clients' optional extras.	Nigel and Frances Coffey live in a bungalow built in 1997. It was perfect for them 20 years ago, but with 5 children ranging in ages from 9 to 26 and with girlfriends the house is just too cramped and they struggle for space. Budget is €450,000.
6 October 2019	Tramore, County Waterford	€290,000	Tom and Claudia bought a 1920s bungalow near Tramore Bay 8 years ago, but the house is now too small for a family of five, the layout is dark and cramped and most of the property does not face the sea. Dermot plans to redesign the interior and add extensions with sea views.
13 October 2019	Drumcondra, Dublin	Final budget €240,000	Glenn and Gustav need to redesign a house previously split into two self contained apartments. The house is so utterly disconnected and no longer works as a single residence Dermot needs to re-evaluate the layout within their budget of €155,000, but hidden structural, roof and chimney problems are putting a strain on their budget.
5 January 2020	Special: Dermot's Home – Part One	N/A	
12 January 2020	Special: Dermot's Home – Part Two	N/A	

=== Series 13 ===
There were five episodes in series 13.

Date	Location	Circumstances
20 Feb 2022	Kilmacud, County Dublin	Architect Dermot Bannon returns to help people to improve their homes, beginning by giving Marc and Lisa Daly advice on their property in Kilmacud, Co Dublin.
16 June 2022	Howth, County Dublin	Architect Dermot Bannon has to work on a tight budget as he helps transforms the drab bungalow of Kenny and Laura Brown from Howth in North Co Dublin.
23 June 2022	Blessington, County Wicklow	Architect Dermot Bannon heads to Blessington, Co Wicklow, to help Hilary and Paul Fairbrother with the massive renovation needed on Hilary's old family home.
30 June 2022	Thurles, County Tipperary	Architect Dermot Bannon travels to Thurles in Co Tipperary to transform the home of Jim and Mary Moloney, but has a challenge as the budget is restrictive.
20 March 2022	Constructive Criticism	Dermot Bannon invites three people to judge some of the most memorable builds from 2018 and 2019 - including a previous client and a superfan of the series.

=== Series 14 ===
There were four episodes in series 14.

Date	Location	Circumstances
09 Nov 2023	Tullamore, County Offaly	Architect Dermot Bannon is back and building again! Dermot and Claire help a young couple in Tullamore renovate an old dwelling with special significance.
16 Nov 2023	Lucan, County Dublin	Dermot tackles a project with an incredibly tight budget.
23 Nov 2023	Blessington, County Wicklow	Dermot has his work cut out for him helping Carmel & Hugh O’Neill from Blessington in West Wicklow downsize for their retirement years in a brand new build.
30 Nov 2023	Castleknock, West Dublin	Dermot helps a couple extend their 3 bedroom semi-detached home in Castleknock, West Dublin.

=== Series 15 ===
There were four episodes in series 15.

Date	Location	Circumstances
07 Jan 2024	Urlingford, County Kilkenny	Dermot Bannon & Claire Irwin are in Urlingford, Kilkenny, to work on an old farmhouse.
14 Jan 2024	Cashel Co. Tipperary	Brian Carrigg and Kate Molony attempt to renovate a bungalow with a view of the Rock of Cashel that Kate has dreamed of owning all her life
21 Jan 2024	Knocklyon, Dublin	Sandra and Daniel Davey bought their dream home in Knocklyon, Dublin over four years ago. However, the house is so cold that their main aim is to make their home more liveable.
28 Jan 2024	Santry, Dublin	Ann Brannigan and her husband David are attempting to give Ann’s former family home in Santry, Dublin a complete renovation.

=== Series 16 ===
There were four episodes in series 16.

Date	Location	Circumstances
05 Jan 2025	Charlestown, Co. Mayo	Architect Dermot Bannon returns with four new designs for four incredible properties. First stop for Dermot and QS Claire is Charlestown in Co. Mayo.
12 Jan 2025	Palmerston, Dublin	In this episode Dermot and Claire aim to help a young family in Palmerstown, Dublin to make the most of the space in their cramped home.
19 Jan 2025	Sligo	Dermot takes on a 1970s seaside bungalow in Sligo.
2 Feb 2025	North Strand, Dublin	Dermot Bannon is in Dublin's North Strand in one of the most challenging builds that Room To Improve has ever seen.

=== Series 17 ===
There were four episodes in series 17.

Date	Location	Circumstances
04 Jan 2026	Clonsilla, Dublin	At Clonsilla in west Dublin, empty nesters Deirdre and Kieran Kelly plan to downsize from their spacious existing home to their beloved first home.
11 Jan 2026	Raheny, Dublin	In Raheny, Dublin Louis and Norita O’Donoghue prepare to transform their much-loved Raheny home with an ambitious renovation.
18 Jan 2026	Kells, Co. Meath	Dermot takes on a 1970s bungalow classic in Kells, Co. Meath, owned by newly-weds Sarah and Liam - a hard working couple who know exactly what they want.
25 Jan 2026	Harmonstown, Dublin	In Harmonstown, Dublin 5, Dermot tackles a former Corporation house. Homeowners Eimear and Adam, who are juggling work, kids and a serious lack of space.
