= Grove Social Club =

Alternative disco club from Clontarf and Raheny, Dublin, Ireland

The Grove Social Club was an Irish alternative discothèque social club which ran for many years in Clontarf (1967-1975) and later Raheny (1975-1997), Northside suburbs of Dublin, Ireland.

== History ==
The Grove opened in 1967 on Mount Prospect Avenue in Clontarf, Dublin, in Belgrove Football Club (from which it got its name). It moved to St. Paul's College, Raheny in 1975, when the old pavilion was burnt down.

The Grove was known as the Northside's original alternative disco, because the music being played there was different from anything being played in other discos in Dublin throughout the whole 30 years of its existence. (e.g. Creedence Clearwater Revival, The Rolling Stones, The Doors, The Beatles, Led Zeppelin, Yes, Jackson Browne, Focus, Deep Purple, Wings, Black Sabbath, Steely Dan, Golden Earring, Queen, The Eagles, ZZ Top, The Boomtown Rats, Supertramp, Guns N' Roses, Rory Gallagher, Fleetwood Mac, Stiff Little Fingers, Thin Lizzy, Sex Pistols, Horslips, Roxy Music, Joy Division, UFO, Genesis, U2, Bruce Springsteen, The Ramones, Whitesnake, Simple Minds, The Cure, Metallica, The Cult, Neil Young, Nirvana, Ian Dury and the Blockheads, AC/DC, B52s, Pearl Jam, Talking Heads, plus many others).

Cecil Nolan was the DJ for the whole 30 years at the Grove until it closed in 1997. Cecil influenced the musical taste of three generations of young northside Dubliners and also shaped their record and CD collections.

== Tributes and reunions ==
In 2001, Joe McElwaine began running Grove tribute nights at The Isaac Butt Venue in Dublin's city centre. In late 2004, Joe eventually persuaded Cecil Nolan to make guest appearances, hence these tributes became reunions and relocated to The Sheiling Hotel in Raheny. These reunions ran four times a year - Easter, Summer, Hallowe'en and Christmas, until the beginning of redevelopment of the Sheiling Hotel into an apartment building in Spring 2008. The Grove Reunions moved to Clontarf Castle, and continued to attract large crowds before moving on to The Abbey Tavern in Howth. The last reunion with Cecil was held there in November 2019 due to his sad passing on 16 November 2020.

The spirit of the Grove is also kept alive all year round on a website and on The Grove Radio Show, broadcasting every second Friday between 9.30pm and 11:30pm GMT on Near FM radio station. The show is dedicated to the memory of Cecil Nolan and showcases playlists and Grove memories from its listeners. Current presenters are Jennifer Roche and Brian Tucker with former presenters Peter Gaynor, Lynne Kavanagh & Sean Duffy. Now in its 14th year, The Grove Radio Show also airs every Tuesday from 9 pm - 11 pm on Nova Classic Rock on there DAB Channel.

A documentary, The Grove - More Than a Feeling, about the Grove was commissioned by Raidió Teilifís Éireann and televised in 2006, it was also featured on RTE on its 50th anniversary.
