= Irish Sailors and Soldiers Land Trust Act 1952 =

Act of the Parliament of the United Kingdom

Irish Sailors and Soldiers Land Trust Act 1952 (Note: Section 2.)
- Act of Parliament
- Parliament of the United Kingdom
- Long title: An Act to extend the powers of the Irish Sailors and Soldiers Land Trust to sell cottages provided for the purposes of the Trust.
- Citation: 15 & 16 Geo. 6 & 1 Eliz. 2. c. 58
- Territorial extent: United Kingdom

Dates
- Royal assent: 30 October 1952
- Commencement: 30 October 1952 (Note: The Acts of Parliament (Commencement) Act 1793.)
Other legislation
Amended by	Irish Sailors and Soldiers Land Trust Act 1967
Relates to	Irish Sailors and Soldiers Land Trust Act 1987

Status: Partially repealed

Text of statute as originally enacted

Text of the Irish Sailors and Soldiers Land Trust Act 1952 as in force today (including any amendments) within the United Kingdom, from legislation.gov.uk.

The Irish Sailors and Soldiers Land Trust Act 1952 (15 & 16 Geo. 6 & 1 Eliz. 2. c. 58) is an act of the Parliament of the United Kingdom.

The act allows the Irish Sailors and Soldiers Land Trust to sell any cottage provided for the purposes of the Trust to any of the men for whose benefit the Trust was established, including any man in occupation of the cottage to be sold or of some other cottage so provided; or to the widow of any such man if they were residing in the cottage together at the time of his death, and she has remained in occupation of it since.

The Irish Sailors and Soldiers Land Trust (ISSLT) was created originally in order to generate housing for ex-servicemen however due to WWI and war veterans now a factor, its priorities changed. The ISSLT was established in 1923 after the act was passed and was set up as an imperial trust working across Ireland. After a statement made by the Minister for Finance at the time Ernest Blythe, it was declared that there would be no contribution to the trust from the Free State and that the entire cost must be covered by the British government. Although this led to issues with the trust obtaining land, the ISSLT continued to construct houses across the Free State. They surpassed their targets and went on to build 2,720 cottages by 1930 across Dublin. They focused on creating housing for war veterans and focused on moving outside of Dublin's city centre. Once the Trust completed its main building there were 20 separate housing schemes across the county of Dublin. Examples include Killester and on Lambay Road in Drumcondra.
