= Mary O'Kelly de Galway =

Irish Belgian resistance operative (1905–1999)

- Born: Mary Cummins; 24 April 1905; Dublin, Ireland
- Died: 20 June 1999 (aged 94); Dublin

Countess Mary "Bunnie" O'Kelly de Galway (24 April 1905 – 20 June 1999) was an Irish Belgian resistance operative, serving as one of a few known examples of such women alongside the likes of Catherine Crean, Agnes Flanagan and Anna Duchêne.

== Early life and education ==
Mary de Galway O'Kelly was born Mary Cummins in Dublin on 24 April 1905. She was one of ten children of plumber or civil engineer, Thomas Patrick Cummins Waterfall Cottage, Richmond Road, and his wife Ellen Black. O'Kelly was schooled at Fairview National School and later the Dominican College in Eccles Street. She showed an aptitude for languages, particularly French, at a young age which led to her deciding to travel to improve her language skills. Moving to Brussels, she taught English to the 12 children of a Belgian countess, and from 1939 she worked for the Canadian embassy as a translator.

== Role in the Belgian resistance ==
O'Kelly was living in Brussels in May 1940 when it was invaded by the German army, and became involved in the resistance. As she held an Irish passport, she could travel far more freely than Belgians. This, along with her access to foreign diplomats, made her a valuable courier whilst also translating and smuggling weapons. She was betrayed to the Gestapo after a number of months, and was arrested in her apartment during the night after her landlady gave them the key. She was brought to Berlin and sentenced to death, imprisoned in a concentration camp, witnessing and being subject to torture. She was moved around continuously, being held in a number of camps including Essen, Bremen and Dresden. Owing to starvation, she reported that she witnessed inmates resorting to cannibalism. She escaped death when a scheduled transport to take her to Auschwitz was derailed. She was liberated on 25 April 1945, at which time she weighed only four stone and was suffering from decalcification of the spine among a number of ailments. O'Kelly spent a number of months in Swiss and Parisian hospitals recovering, wearing a "plaster jacket" for six months. She received decorations from General Eisenhower and King Leopold in 1946.

== Later life and death ==
In 1946 while undergoing an assessment for compensation, she met Count Guy (Gui) O'Kelly de Galway, a barrister of Irish descent. They married in 1949 and moved to Ireland. She saw her husband depart from Dublin Airport as he travelled to England on business in 1964, after this goodbye she never saw him again and his disappearance was never solved.

O'Kelly was known by her nieces and nephews as "Auntie Bunnie". She lived in Clontarf, where she was a well-known figure. When in her 80s she was interviewed at length for the RTÉ Radio documentary In the shadow of death. She remained active into her 90s, commenting that "They'll have to shoot me." O'Kelly died in Dublin on 20 June 1999 and was cremated at Glasnevin Cemetery.
