= Kevin Mays =

Rugby union player

- Full name: Kevin Michael Andrew Mays
- Born: 9 August 1949 (age 77) London, England
- Height: 6 ft 6 in (198 cm)

Rugby union career
- Position: Lock
International career
Years	Team	Apps	(Points)
1973	Ireland	4	(0)

Kevin Michael Andrew Mays (born 9 August 1949) is an Irish former rugby union international.

Mays, born in London, attended Dublin's St Paul's College.

A lock, Mays was capped four times Ireland in 1973. He debuted in the draw against the All Blacks at Lansdowne Road and featured in three of Ireland's 1973 Five Nations matches.

Mays had four sons who played rugby for Gonzaga College. He is a solicitor by profession.

== See also ==
- List of Ireland national rugby union players
