= James Frederic Ferguson =

- Born: 1807
- Died: 1855 (aged 47–48)
- Other names: Antiquary

James Frederic Ferguson (1807–1855) was an Irish antiquary.

== Life ==
Ferguson was born at Charleston, South Carolina, in 1807. He was of French descent, son of Jacques Frédéric Jaquemain, a native of Cambrai. During the time of the French Revolution Jaquemain left France and settled in London, assuming the name of Ferguson in 1793. Six years later he went to America, and in 1800 became deputy-postmaster of Beaufort, South Carolina, where he resided till 1812. After the death of his wife, an English lady, Jaquemain went to London, where he became a teacher of languages. Subsequently, he established a school in St Stephen's Green, Dublin. In 1823 he published a volume of Italian translations from the classic poets.

James Frederic Ferguson the younger accompanied his father to Dublin in 1820, and some years later was engaged on behalf of Lord Kingsland in endeavouring to recover for that nobleman the Kingsland estates. His efforts were partially successful. In 1850 Ferguson was appointed clerk and secretary to a commission for arranging the records of the Irish courts, and this office he held until its abolition two years later. By direction of the chief baron, he continued in charge of the records from the time of the cessation of the commission until his death. On one occasion he undertook at his own expense a journey to Switzerland, in order to recover some Irish records in the collection of a Swabian baron. These records proved to belong to the Irish court of king's bench in the reign of Edward I, and it was surmised that they had been purloined in the reign of George I when Addison was keeper of the records in the Bermingham Tower of Dublin Castle. Ferguson purchased them at his own cost, and restored them to the State Paper Office. Ferguson died on 26 November 1855.

== Works ==
He became a collaborator with William Lynch, author of Feudal Dignities in Ireland, in arranging the voluminous series of "Irish Records". Extensive collections of documents were formed, some of which afterwards passed into the library of Sir William Betham. Ferguson's most important work was the indexing of the entire body of Exchequer Records in Ireland, which he completed unassisted. The indexes were purchased by the government in order to be permanently deposited in the court of exchequer.

In 1843 Ferguson published Remarks on the Limitations of Actions Bill intended for Ireland; together with short extracts from Ancient Records relating to Advowsons of Churches in Ireland. To the Transactions of the Kilkenny Archaeological Society he communicated a calendar of the contents of the "Red Book" of the Irish exchequer; and to the Gentleman's Magazine (January 1855) he communicated a description of the ancient drawing of the court of exchequer, contained in the above manuscript calendar. To the Topographer and Genealogist he communicated the account of Sir Toby Caulfeild relative to the Earl of Tyrone and other fugitives from Ulster in 1616; a curious series of notes on the exactions anciently incident to tenures in Ireland; a list of the castles, &c., in Ireland in 1676, with a note on hearth- money; and a singular document of 3 Edward II, relative to a contest between the king's purveyors and the secular clergy of Meath.

Ferguson further contributed to the Gentleman's Magazine two important articles on the neglected state of the Irish State Records (1853–4), and a paper on the unpublished statutes of Ireland (1855). At his decease he left incomplete a translation of the "Norman-French Chronicle of the Conquest of Ireland", which M. Michel edited from a manuscript in Lambeth Palace Library.
