= Dermot Bannon =

Irish celebrity architect

- Born: 2 May 1972 (age 54); Malahide, Dublin, Ireland
- Education: Hull School of Architecture
- Occupation: Architect
- Spouse: Louise Bannon (m. 2002)
- Children: 3
- Practice: Dermot Bannon Architects
- Projects: Room to Improve
- Website: dermotbannonarchitects.com

Dermot Bannon (born 2 May 1972) is an Irish architect and television presenter best known for being the host of the Room to Improve television series.

== Early life ==
Dermot Bannon was born in the Malahide suburb of Dublin, Ireland on 2 May 1972 to Mary and Jim Bannon, a horticulturist. He has two younger siblings, Padraig and Fionnuala. When he was seven, Bannon and his family emigrated to Egypt as his father had taken a job in Cairo then returning back to Ireland two years later.

== Career ==
When he was 18, he began studying in Hull School of Architecture in Kingston upon Hull, Yorkshire, England. In 1994, Bannon appeared on Blind Date alongside Jenni Falconer while studying abroad. Upon graduating, Bannon returned to Dublin and joined the Moloney O'Beirne Architects firm.

In 2006, he had noticed an advertisement for a presenter for a new television series called House Hunters to fill in for Roisin Murphy, a fellow TV architect who was on maternity leave, which he hosted for one season. Bannon began to work on RTE's Room to Improve the following year. Bannon established his own architectural firm, Dermot Bannon Architects, in 2008.

A follow-up show, Room to Improve: Constructive Criticism was also aired in 2022. A new series, Dermot Bannon's Incredible Homes, was cut short in 2020 by the COVID-19 pandemic, and resumed airing in April 2022. In 2015, he released a book called Love Your Home.

Bannon is a client of self-styled "agent to the stars" Noel Kelly of NK Management. Bannon is also a "brand ambassador" for Volvo, a deal arranged by Noel Kelly of NK Management. As part of this deal with Volvo, Bannon promoted a plug-in hybrid SUV worth more than €95,000 in 2021. Bannon is also a "brand ambassador" for County Meath-based company WillowWarm, which produces briquettes, a type of compressed willow mulch used for fuel.

== Personal life ==
Dermot married his wife Louise in 2002 and they have three children: Sarah, James and Thomas. Bannon's father died in 2007 before the first episode of Room to Improve aired.
