= Clontarf, Dublin =

Coastal suburb of Dublin, Ireland

Clontarf Cluain Tarbh (Irish)
- Suburb
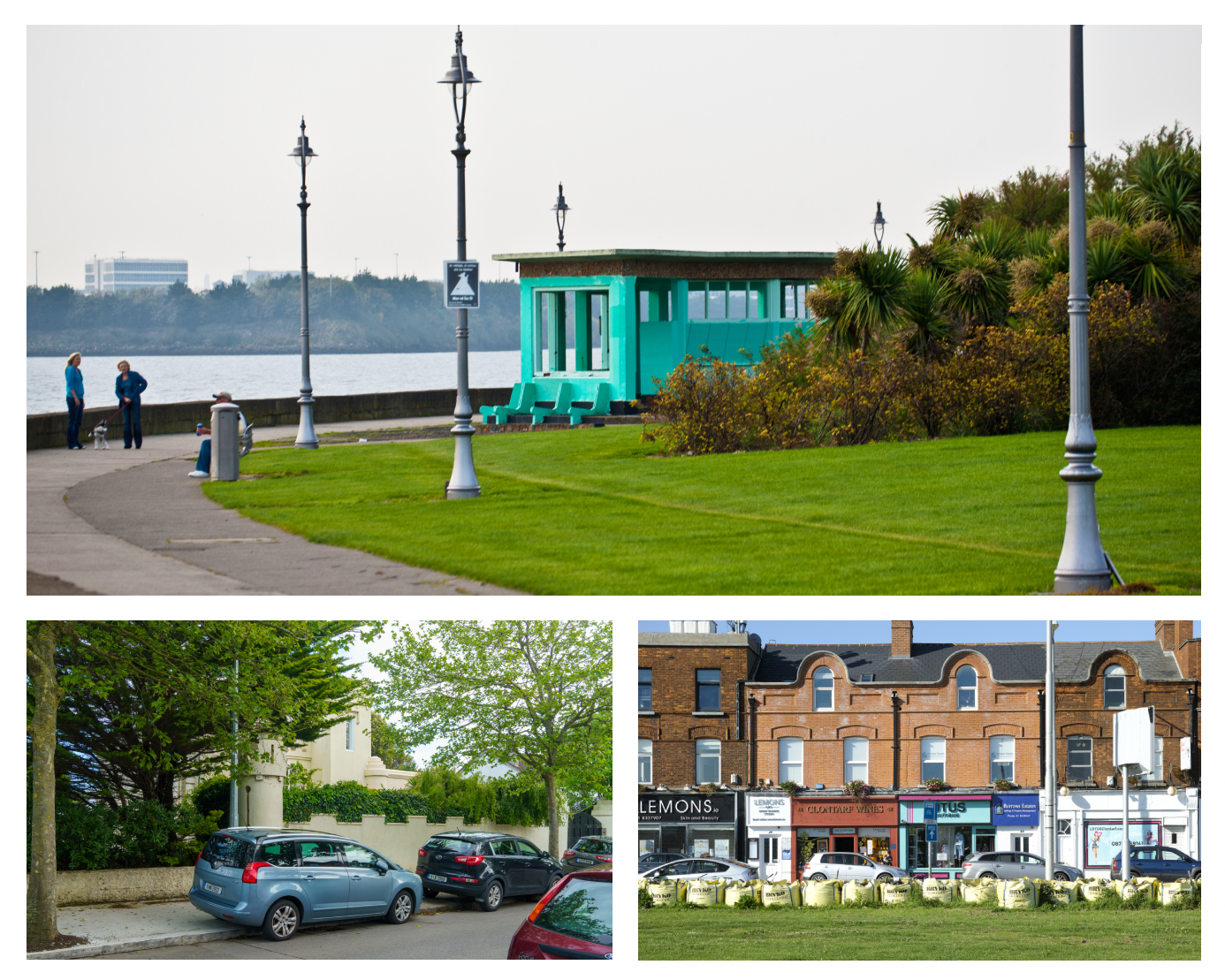
- Clockwise from top: Clontarf promenade; businesses along the promenade; Mount Prospect Avenue, Clontarf

- Location in Ireland
- Coordinates: 53°21′54″N 6°12′36″W
- Country: Ireland
- Province: Leinster
- County: Dublin
- Local authority: Dublin City Council
- Time zone: UTC+0 (WET)
  - Summer (DST): UTC-1 (IST (WEST))
- Eircode routing key: D03

Clontarf (Irish: Cluain Tarbh, meaning 'meadow of (the) bulls') is an affluent coastal suburb on the Northside of Dublin in the city's Dublin 3 postal district. Historically, there were two centres of population, one on the coast towards the city, and the fishing village of Clontarf Sheds, further north on the coast at what is now Vernon Avenue. Clontarf has a range of retail businesses in several locations, mainly centred on Vernon Avenue. It adjoins Fairview, Marino, Killester and Raheny. Clontarf is in the jurisdiction of Dublin City Council.

Clontarf was a core site of the Battle of Clontarf in 1014, in which Brian Boru, High King of Ireland, defeated the Vikings of Dublin and their allies, the Irish of Leinster. This battle, which extended over a wide area, from modern Ballybough to Kilbarrack, at least, is seen as marking an end to the Irish-Viking Wars.

== Etymology ==
The name Cluain Tarbh means "pasture/meadow of (the) bulls", cluain being "meadow" and tarbh meaning "of bulls" in Irish. The name is often rendered as "The Meadow of the Bull".

== Geography ==
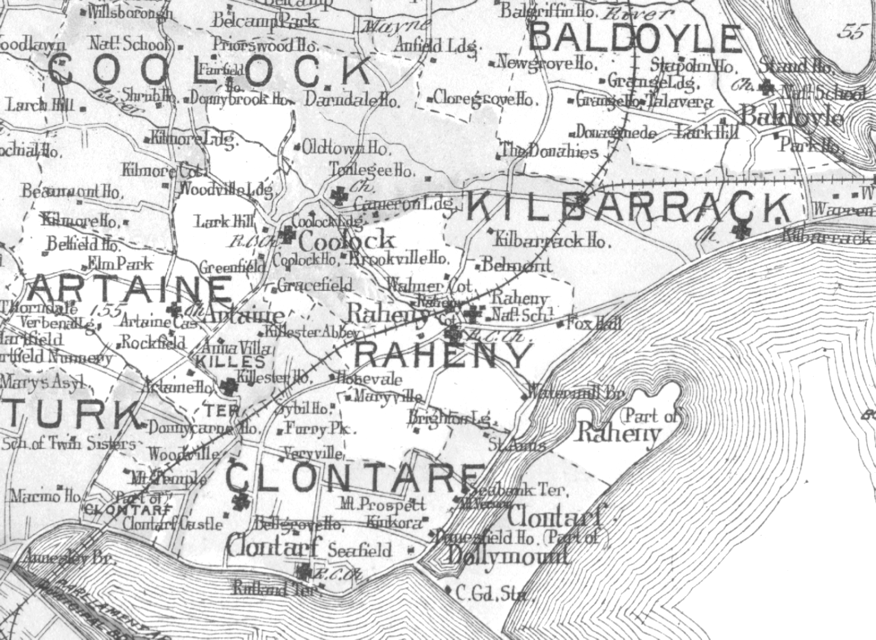
Clontarf & nearby districts, 1901

Clontarf is on the northern side of Dublin city, northeast of the city centre, along the coast. It is bounded to the west and south by Fairview Park and the suburb of Marino, to the north by the suburbs of Killester and Artane and to the northeast by Saint Anne's Park and the suburb of Raheny. The southern boundary of Clontarf lies on one side of the estuary of one of Dublin's three main rivers, the River Tolka. The Wad River, another of Dublin's secondary watercourses, joins the Tolka estuary right at the city end of Clontarf's coastline, while the Naniken River runs through St. Anne's Park and reaches the sea at the Raheny end of the district, its mouth marking the civil parish boundary between Clontarf and Raheny. The district is fairly level, rising slightly inland.

Bull Island – sometimes the North Bull Island to distinguish it from the sandbank of the South Bull – is also shared with Raheny. It is connected to Clontarf at its northern end by a historic wooden bridge, in the locality of Dollymount. While most of the island is city property, the (North) Bull Wall and breakwater, related road and path, and the Bull (Wooden) Bridge belong to the Dublin Port Company and are closed for a day each year to assert this. At the end of the breakwater is a statue of Our Lady, Star of the Sea (Irish: Réalt na Mara), erected to watch over mariners and dockworkers.

Clontarf is a civil parish in the ancient barony of Coolock, in turn, comprising multiple townlands.

=== Clontarf Island ===
There used to be an island, called Clontarf Island, off the coast of Clontarf near the mouth of the Tolka, as shown on maps such as that of John Rocque in 1753, with a single dwelling, and at some periods (notably in the 19th century), bathing facilities. The island was also used as a refuge from the plague in 1650. Construction work on the Great South Wall and the Bull Wall in Dublin Port changed the flow of water in Dublin Bay, threatening its existence, though it was in fact eventually destroyed by a large storm in 1844.

== Access ==
Clontarf lies between the coastal and inland roads from Dublin to Howth, and its seafront is served by the 130, 104 and H2 bus routes, while the inland parts are covered by buses on the Howth Road, such as the H1, H2 and H3. The area's historic railway station, on Howth Road, closed many years ago, but a new railway station, Clontarf Road railway station, the first stop north of the city centre on the Dublin Area Rapid Transit system, is located between Clontarf and Fairview.

== History ==
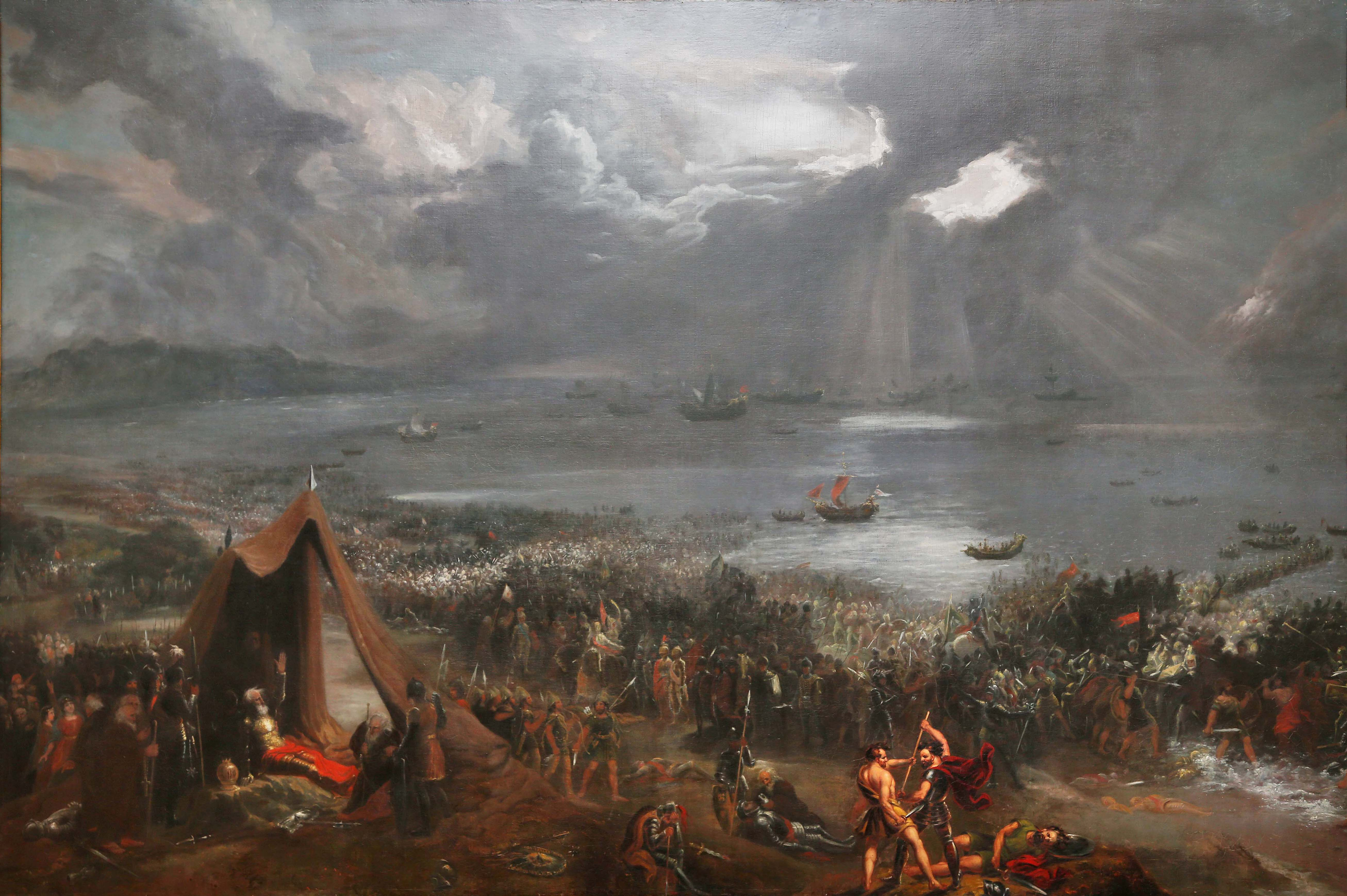
Oil painting of Battle of Clontarf by Hugh Frazer, 1826

Following the defeat of the Vikings and the Leinstermen at the Battle of Clontarf in 1014, the High King of Ireland Brian Boru (Brian Boróimhe) is said to have been killed with a battle axe while he was found in prayer in his tent by a Danish Viking named Brodu. So great was the fighting which ensued among competing kings following this event that one analyst stated they "...turned the country into a trembling sod". Clontarf itself enjoyed relative peace for over 100 years until the arrival of the Normans in 1172. Shortly afterwards, Clontarf was granted to Adam de Pheypo, a follower of Strongbow, who built the first Clontarf Castle.

A settlement at Clontarf has been dated to at least the 12th century, and in the 19th century remains from earlier times were thought to have been found. Clontarf features on the 1598 map "A Modern Depiction of Ireland, One of the British Isles" by Abraham Ortelius as "Clantarfe".

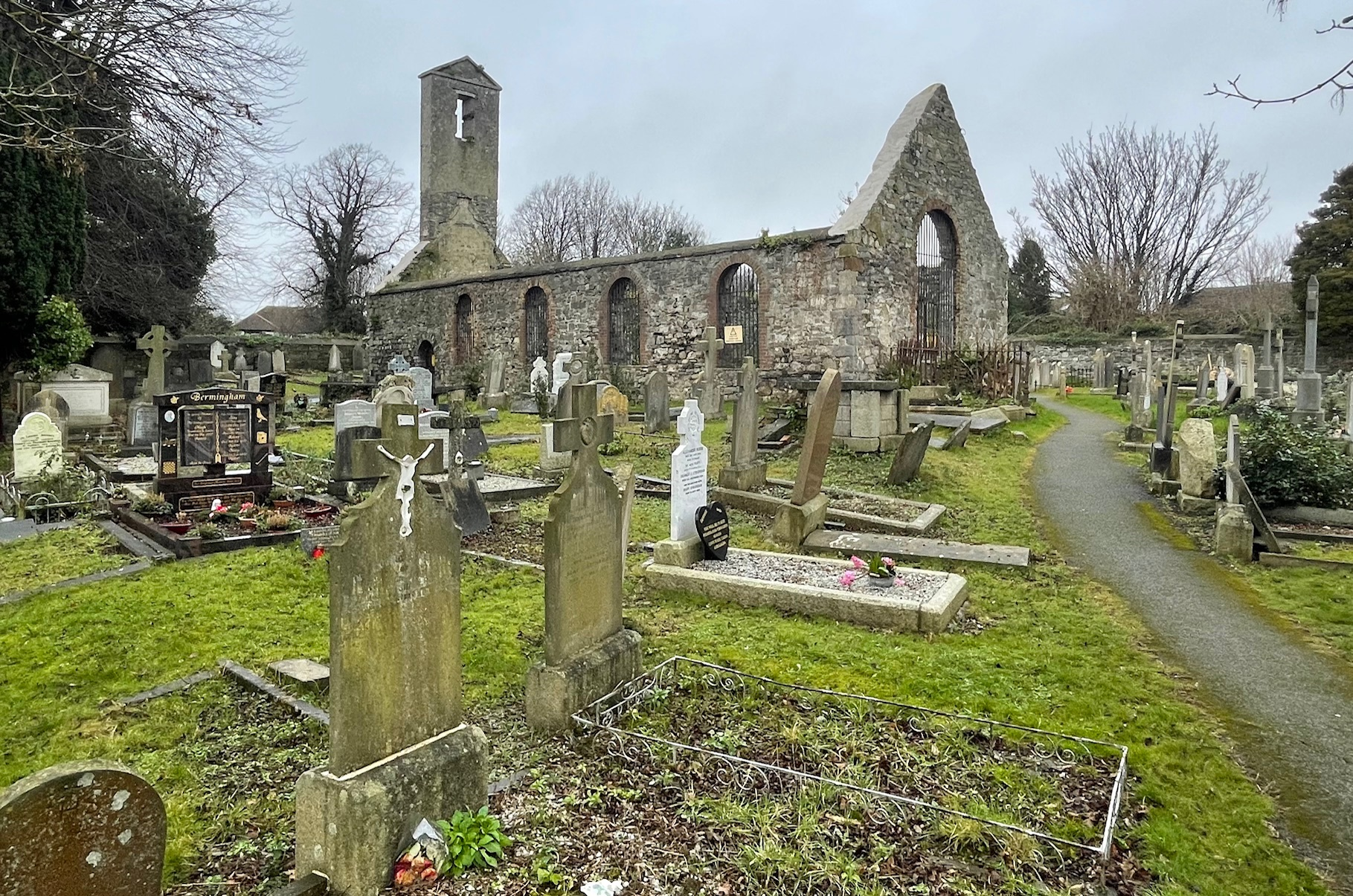
St John the Baptist, Castle Avenue

The manor and church of Clontarf were held by the Templars, and subsequently the Hospitallers, and there was a holy well in the area near what is now The Stiles Road until recent times (another spring, named for Brian Boroimhe, of uncertain age, still exists, on Castle Avenue near the coast).

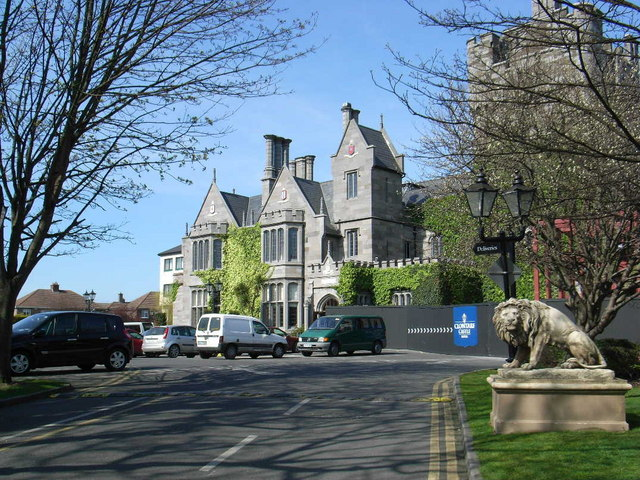
Clontarf Castle

A manor house and a small associated village were located on the slight ridge overlooking the sea where the Clontarf Castle Hotel is now situated. The manor house was rebuilt many times, with the current hotel dating largely to the early 19th century. The tower house on the site is a 19th-century replica of the original Templar structure. The adjoining ruined church is the old Church of Ireland parish church, which dates to the mid-17th century.

Clontarf Castle was burnt in 1641 by the Governor of Dublin, Sir Charles Coote, apparently in revenge for the disloyalty of its owner, George King. The castle, estate and district were given in 1649 by Oliver Cromwell to John Blackwell, who assigned his interest to John Vernon, Quartermaster-General of Cromwell's army in Ireland, although this is described in Lewis's Topographical Dictionary of 1837 as “conferred by the Crown on Admiral Vernon”. The Vernon family subsequently occupied the Castle for nearly three hundred and fifty years.

In 1659, the population of Clontarf was 79.

Fishing, oyster-catching and farming remained the main occupations over the following centuries, with a major fish-curing industry at the Sheds, near the foot of Vernon Avenue (the Public House at the site still bears the name), around 1 km from the original village. In the 18th century, this developed into a secondary settlement of fishermen and small farmers, living in basic cabins and with drying sheds for their catch. The settlement is prominently marked on navigation maps for Dublin Bay dating to the 18th century. However, as with many such 'informal' settlements in Ireland, Clontarf Sheds became the site for a 19th-century Roman Catholic church – the Church of Ireland St. John's Church, and the Roman Catholic St. Anthony's closer to the original settlement – and then outgrew the original village.

The 1837 Lewis report remarked that "The land in this Parish is reported to be in the very highest state of cultivation..."

=== 19th century ===
In the early 19th century, Clontarf had become a holiday resort for the citizens of Dublin, who came out from the city to enjoy bathing in the sea or in the hot and cold seawater baths erected by Mr. Brierly. A horse omnibus service from the city was started and Clontarf became a fashionable place to live – Samuel Lewis lists twenty-seven major houses, apart from Clontarf Castle, in which resided wealthy and important gentry. (Note: Among them were Thomas Gresham, founder of the Gresham Hotel and W.C. Colville, owner of major property holdings in the centre of Dublin) The Confirmation list for 1824 includes four titled ladies – Lady Charlemont, Lady Caroline Clements, Lady Maria Caulfield and Lady Emily Caulfield. Clontarf had an important role in the career of the prominent Irish nationalist leader Daniel O'Connell who sought to hold on this location, symbolic because of its association with the Battle of Clontarf in 1014, a mass meeting calling for repeal of the Act of Union. The meeting was banned by then-Prime Minister, Sir Robert Peel, and despite appeals from his supporters, O'Connell refused to defy the authorities and he called off the meeting, as he was unwilling to risk bloodshed.

A key arrival at Clontarf was Sir Benjamin Lee Guinness, son of Arthur Guinness II and his partner in running the brewery, who purchased various lands in Clontarf and Raheny, combining them to form St. Anne's Estate (the remnants of which form Saint Anne's Park).

By the late 19th century Clontarf was becoming urbanised, initially as a holiday resort for wealthy Dubliners, but rapidly as a suburb of the city. A tram line was laid along the coast, increasing activity in the area.

== Amenities ==
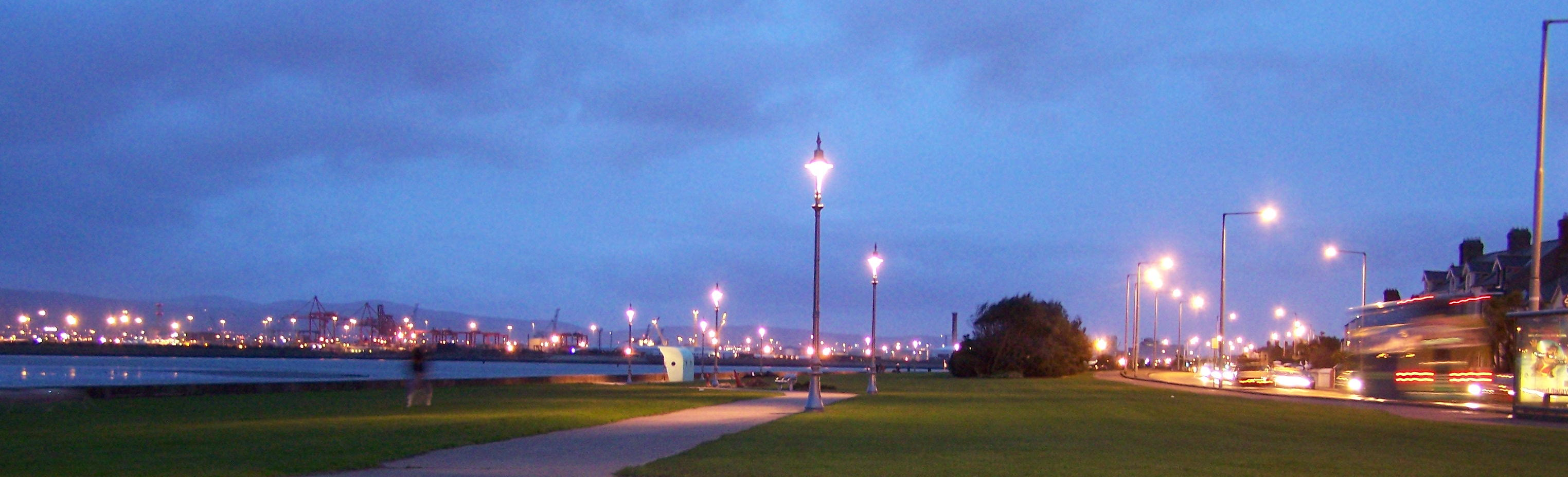
Lights on Clontarf's waterfront

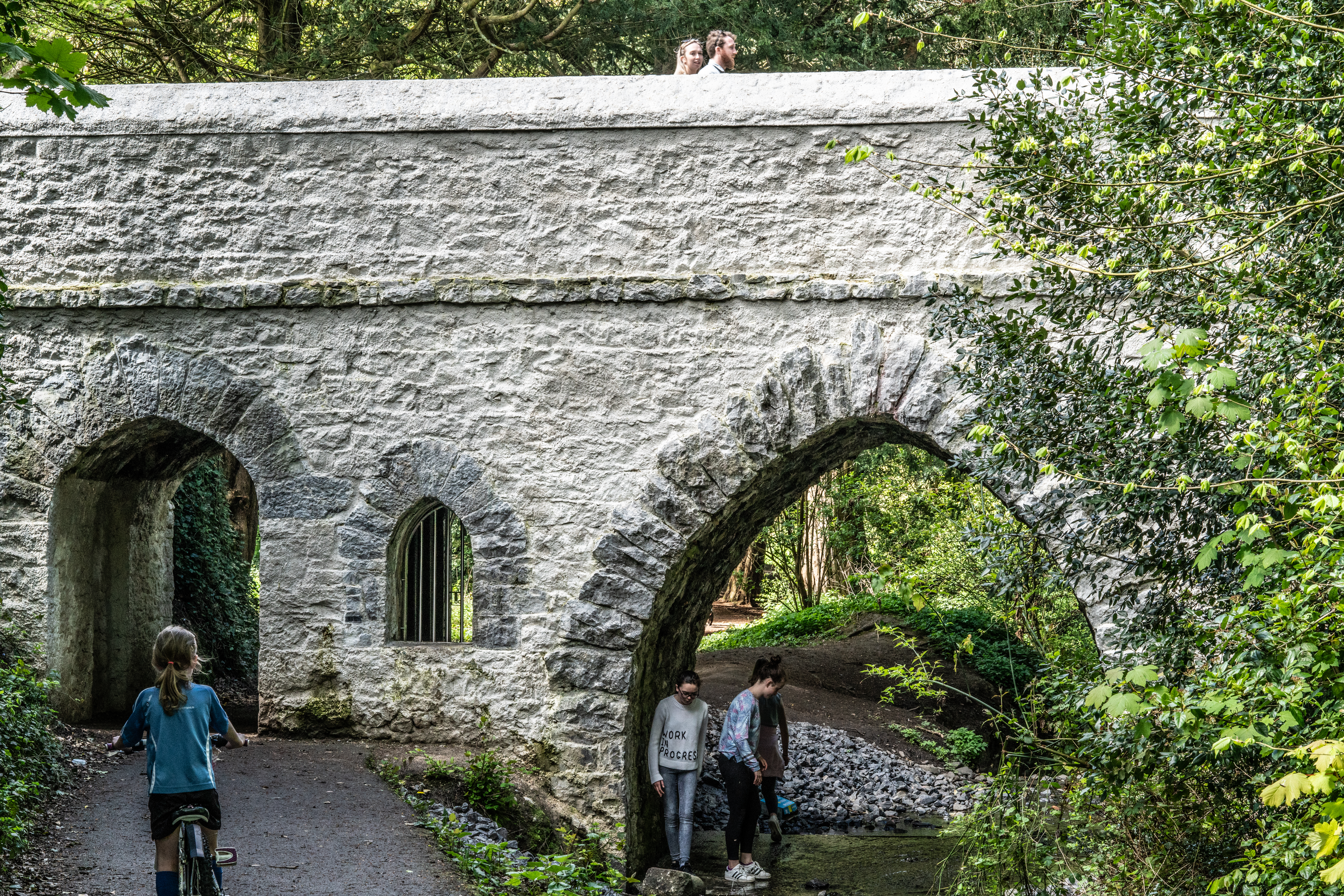
An ornamental bridge in St. Anne's Park

Clontarf's most notable amenity is its seafront, with a promenade running continuously from Alfie Byrne Road to the wooden bridge at Dollymount, totalling 4.5 km in length. From 1911 to 1958 the promenade was improved with a variety of shelters and lifeguard stations added by the Dublin Corporation. The most notable of these structures date from the 1930s and were designed by Herbert Simms, which are primarily executed in pre-cast concrete. More shelters were added later, in the 1950s.

The seafront is used by runners, walkers, sailors and cyclists. Among the features of the promenade is an Easter Island Moai replica statue, a diplomatic gift from the ambassador of Chile, which is located just across the road from The Sheds pub.

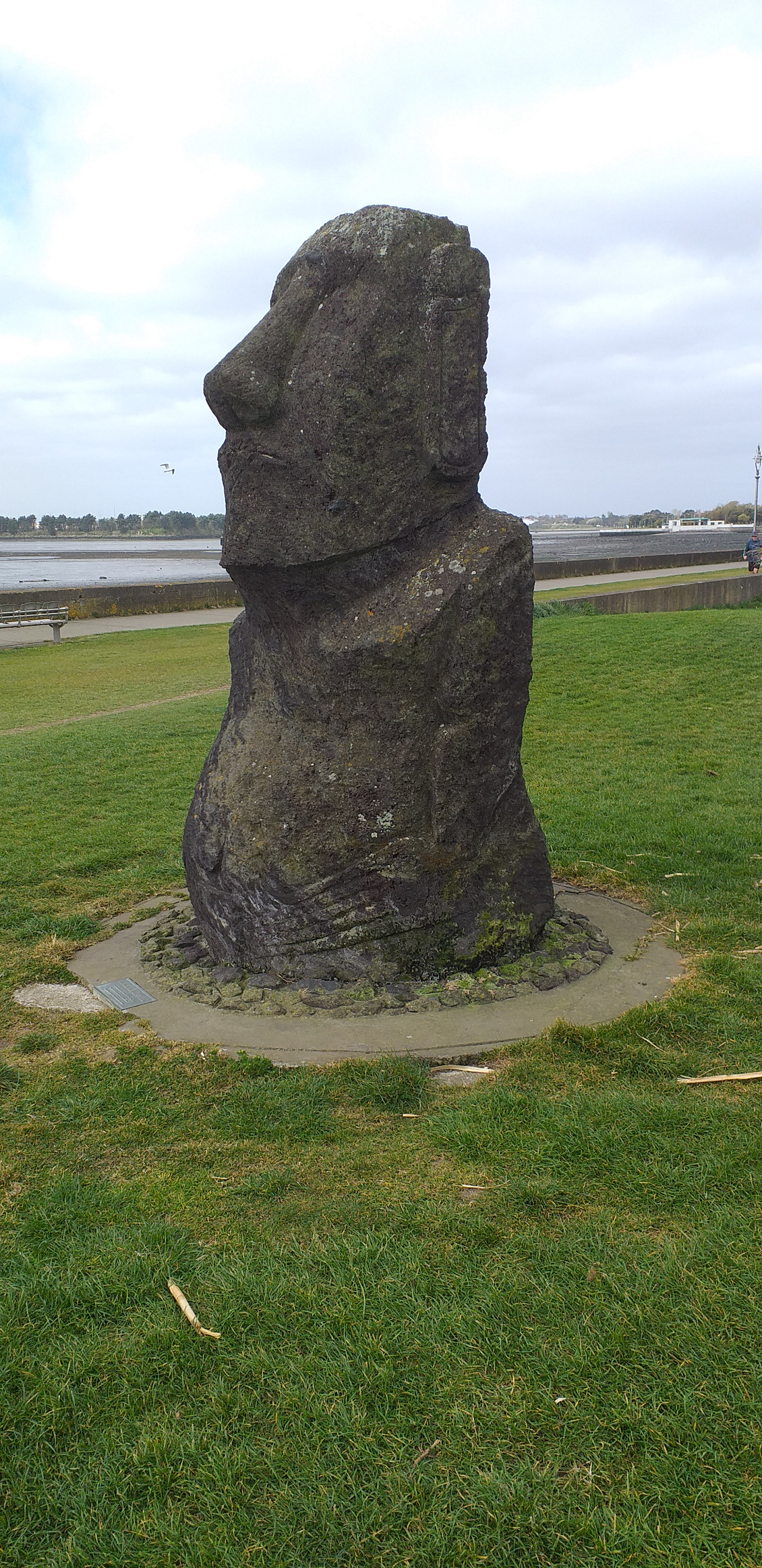
Easter Island statue on Clontarf promenade

Also on the promenade is Clontarf's privately owned open-air seawater swimming pool, once a recreational destination with hot and cold baths, closed in 1996, and then became derelict. But in 2017 it was redeveloped with a restaurant and bar open to the public within licensed hours. Originally scheduled to open in autumn 2017, it eventually did so in February 2018, but it was announced in January 2018 that public-access swimming would not initially be offered, only, under certain conditions, swimming for clubs, unless a six-figure public subsidy was made available. The city council noted that this might breach planning conditions, as the substantial development on the publicly owned promenade was approved on an assumption of public swimming potential.

There is also a public slipway, across the road from the Clontarf Yacht and Boat Club clubhouse.

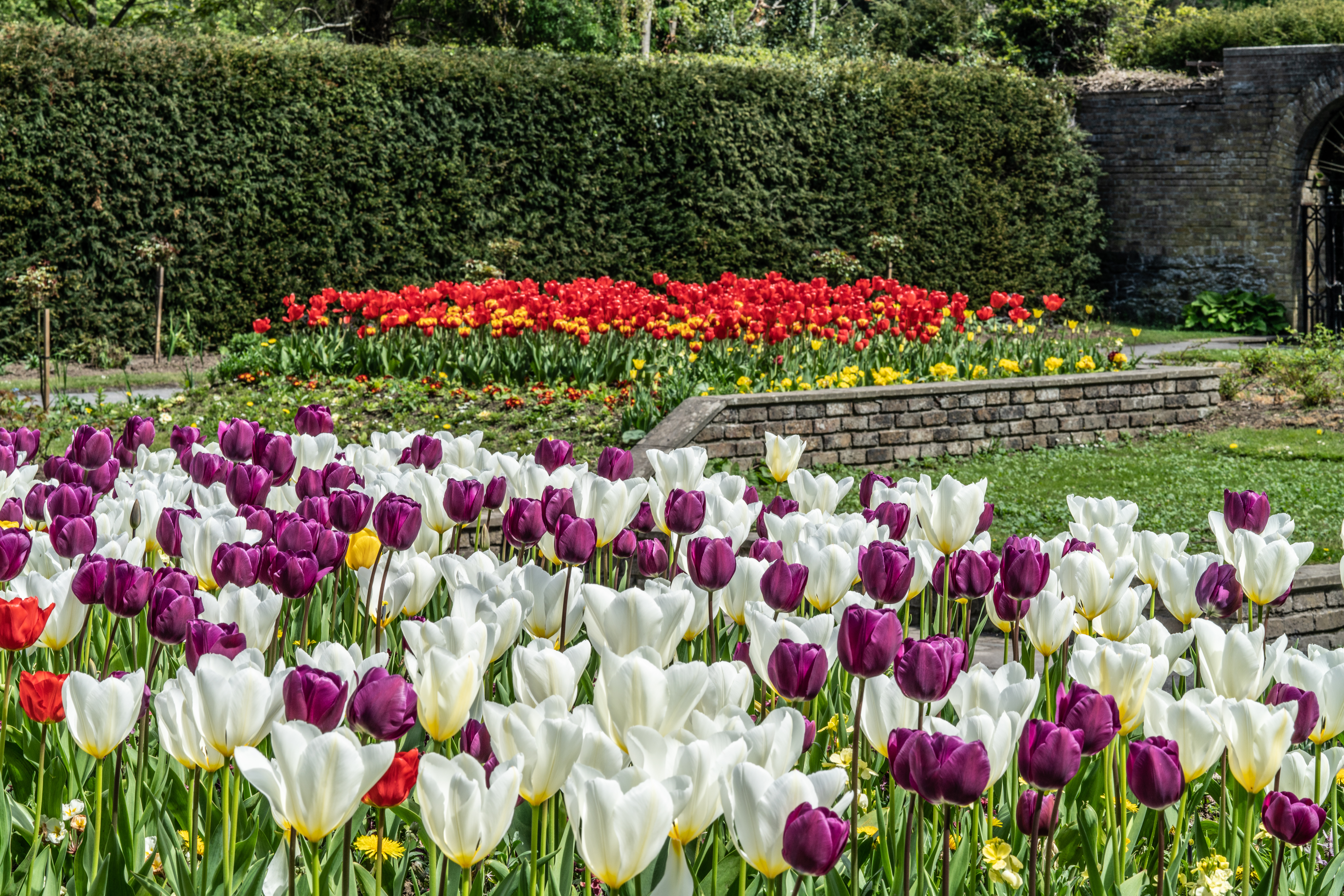
A flower garden in St. Anne's Park

Clontarf also reaches into Saint Anne's Park, which it shares with Raheny. As well as extensive walks and green areas, the park contains numerous sporting facilities, such as playing pitches and non-sport amenities. These include an Arts Centre in the Red Stables, featuring artists' stores and studios, a coffee shop and markets on some weekends, along with a large rose garden which is located alongside the Gaelic Athletic Association pitches.

Clontarf also has access to the North Bull Island in the area known as Dollymount. The island contains the amenity of Dollymount Strand as well as two golf courses. The island is also known for its wildlife, and the lagoon and mudflats between the island and the mainland are a favourite spot for birdwatching.

Clontarf is home to a wide range of businesses, many of which are members of the local Chamber of Commerce. There is a supermarket on Vernon Avenue, and there are, for example, a number of public houses, restaurants, convenience stores, bank branches, pharmacies and medical practitioners. Dublin Bus has a depot on Clontarf Road, at the corner with Conquer Hill Road. It was one of the six original depots of Dublin Bus, upon its creation in February 1987. This bus depot was a former tram shed for the Dublin-Dollymount tram route of Dublin United Transport Company.

=== Schools ===
Local primary schools are the Belgrove National School group on Seafield Road West, Greenlanes NS (mixed, Church of Ireland patronage), off Seafield Road East, and Howth Road NS (mixed, Presbyterian patronage), on the border with Fairview. Greenlanes and Howth Road Presbyterian have "junior" and "senior" divisions, while the Belgrove group actually consists of four legally distinct schools, all formally named for John the Baptist and each with its own roll number, staff and principal, on a common campus, which also holds the premises of Clontarf GAA club.

At second level, the area holds Holy Faith School (a former convent school for girls, now in the patronage of The Le Cheile Schools Trust), and the mixed Mount Temple Comprehensive School, which, while it appears to be in Donnycarney, is actually in a remote pocket of Clontarf. Other popular schools are St. Paul's College, Raheny for boys, followed by CUS Leeson Street, and Belvedere College S.J. both in the city centre, Loreto College, St Stephens Green for girls, and the Institute of Education (mixed, 4th to 6th year only).

Special education facilities exist at the premises of the Central Remedial Clinic and the Irish Wheelchair Association.

=== Churches ===
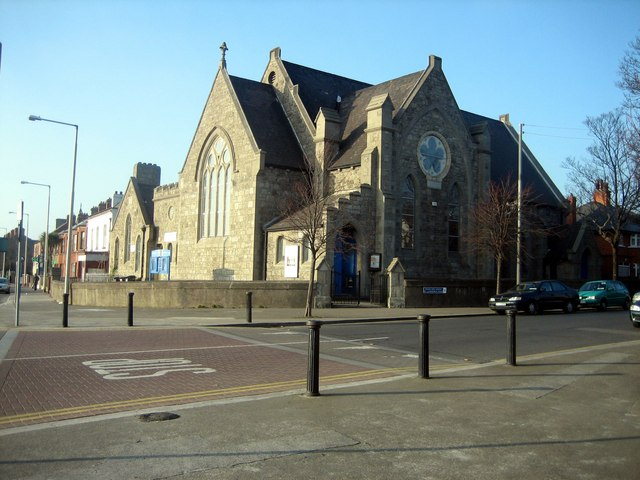
Methodist Church, Clontarf

Clontarf today has three Roman Catholic parishes (for more see Parish of Clontarf (Roman Catholic)), a Church of Ireland Parish of Clontarf, a Presbyterian congregation and a Methodist parish. In addition to existing churches, there is a ruined church near Clontarf Castle, and the current Catholic Church of St Anthony is built behind the old St Anthony's Church, still in use as a hall; this building was previously Clontarf Town Hall.

Historically Clontarf has had a strong Protestant community for many years, with the Church of Ireland parish being one of the most populated Anglican parishes in the country up to the 1950s. In the 1911 census, 39% of the population of Clontarf were Protestant, 25% being Church of Ireland, 8.5% Presbyterian and 5.5% Methodist. Relations between all the faith communities have always been good in Clontarf and mixed marriages were part of life even in 1911.

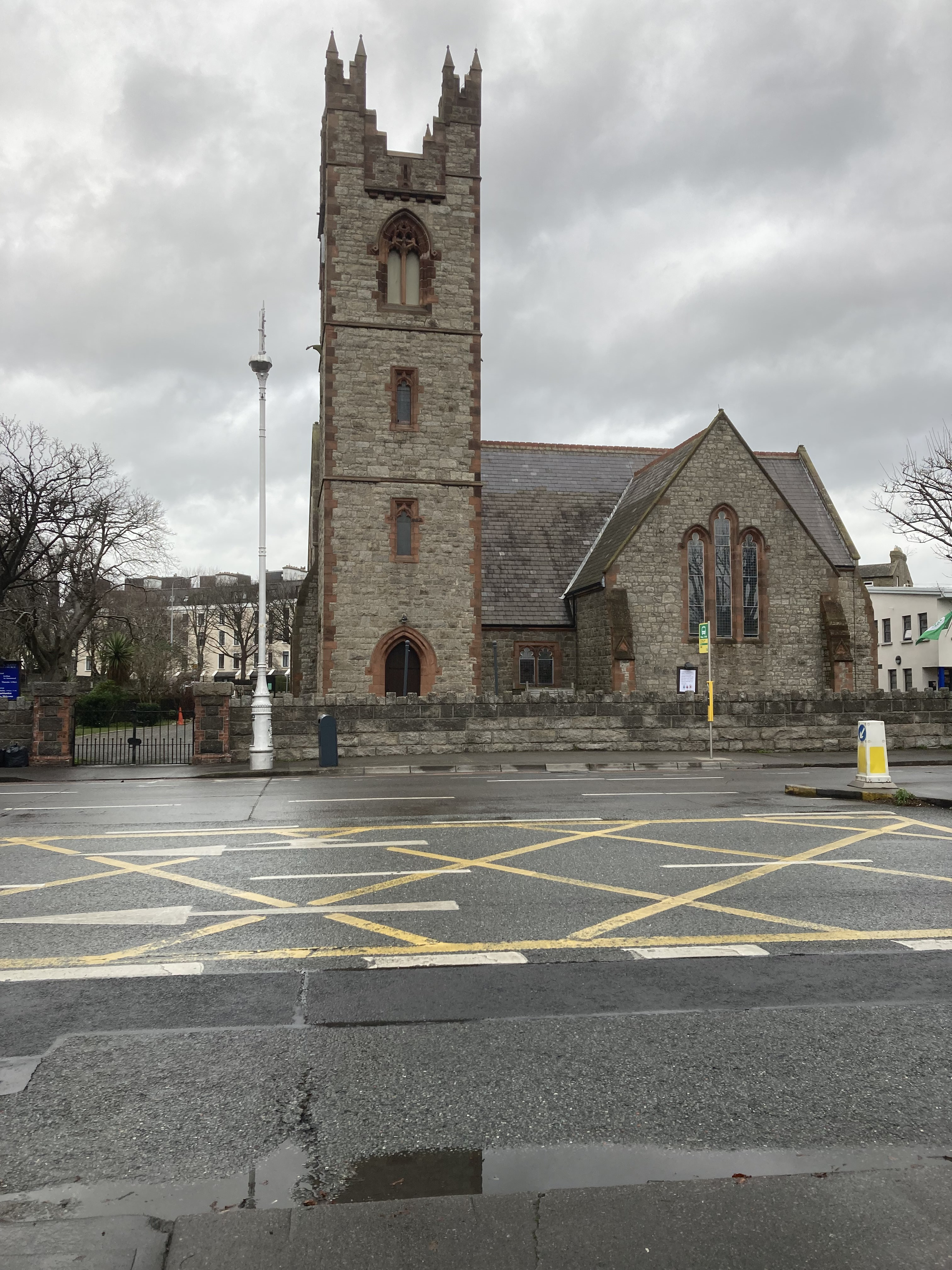
Presbyterian Church, Clontarf

== Sport and social organisations ==
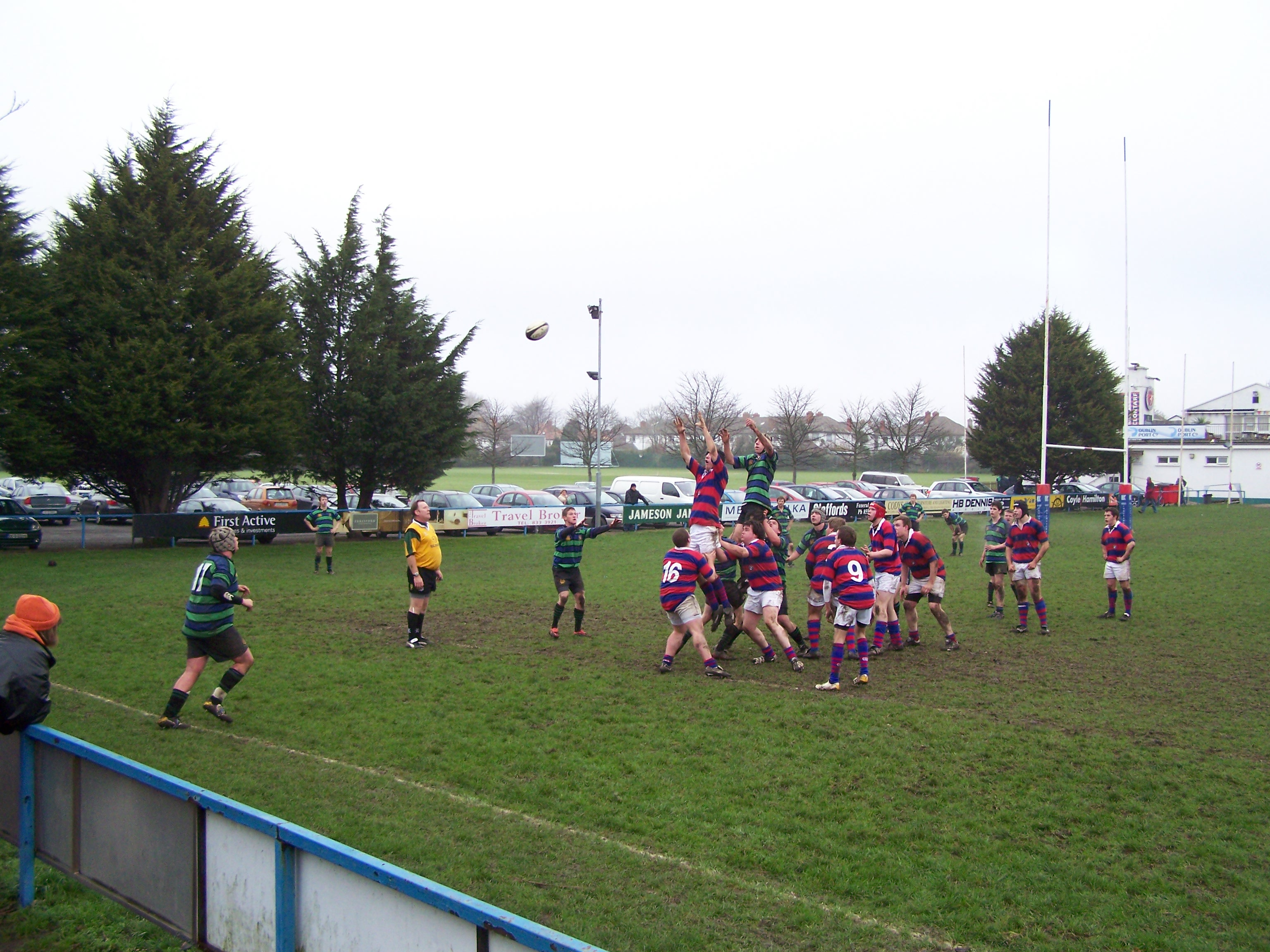
Clontarf rugby team (in the same red and blue colours used by other Clontarf sporting organisations), with Clontarf cricket club in the background

Clontarf has many clubs whose members take part in sporting activities, including rugby, soccer, golf, cricket, sailing and Gaelic games.

Clontarf has a strong rugby club, with their senior XV reaching two all-Ireland league finals under former coach Phil Werahiko. The Clontarf Cricket Club Ground, based at the same premises as the rugby club, was the host for the final of the 2005 ICC Trophy cricket tournament. It has hosted various cricket internationals, most recently against Australia in the summer of 2010, and is the home ground of the Ireland cricket team in the Republic of Ireland. Ireland is due to play another ODI against England in August 2011 at the ground.

The Clontarf Cricket Club senior 1st XI have won the Leinster Senior Cup in 2007 and 2008.

Clontarf is home to a number of GAA clubs that compete in the Dublin county championship in Gaelic football, ladies' football, hurling and camogie. Founded in 1961, Clontarf GAA are based on Seafield Road and play their home matches at St Anne's Park in Raheny. Scoil Uí Chonaill CLG are located on the Clontarf Road and have been competing since 1953.

The area also has two tennis clubs - Clontarf Lawn Tennis Club on Oulton Road, and Clontarf Parish Lawn Tennis Club on Seafield Road.

Clontarf Taekwon-do Club, based in Belgrove Boys' school, has been in existence since 2013. The club competes at National, International, European and World level in Taekwondo.

Sailing has long been associated with Clontarf with its local Clontarf Yacht & Boat Club, one of the- oldest yacht clubs in Dublin Bay, celebrating its centenary in 1975. The area used for sailing is tidal, which limits the number of hours per day when sailing is possible.

Hydroplane racing In the 1930s Clontarf was the base for the North Dublin branch of the Motor Yacht Club of Ireland. It is assumed that the racing took place in the "Blue Lagoon", the space between Bull Island and Dollymount.

The Clontarf Scout Troop was established in 1931.

Clontarf is also home to the Central Remedial Clinic (whose swimming pool has some public access hours) and to the Incorporated Orthopaedic Hospital of Ireland (since 1876), as well as a major centre of the Irish Wheelchair Association.

There is no current local newspaper, but past journals included "Clontarf's Eye".

== Governance and representation ==
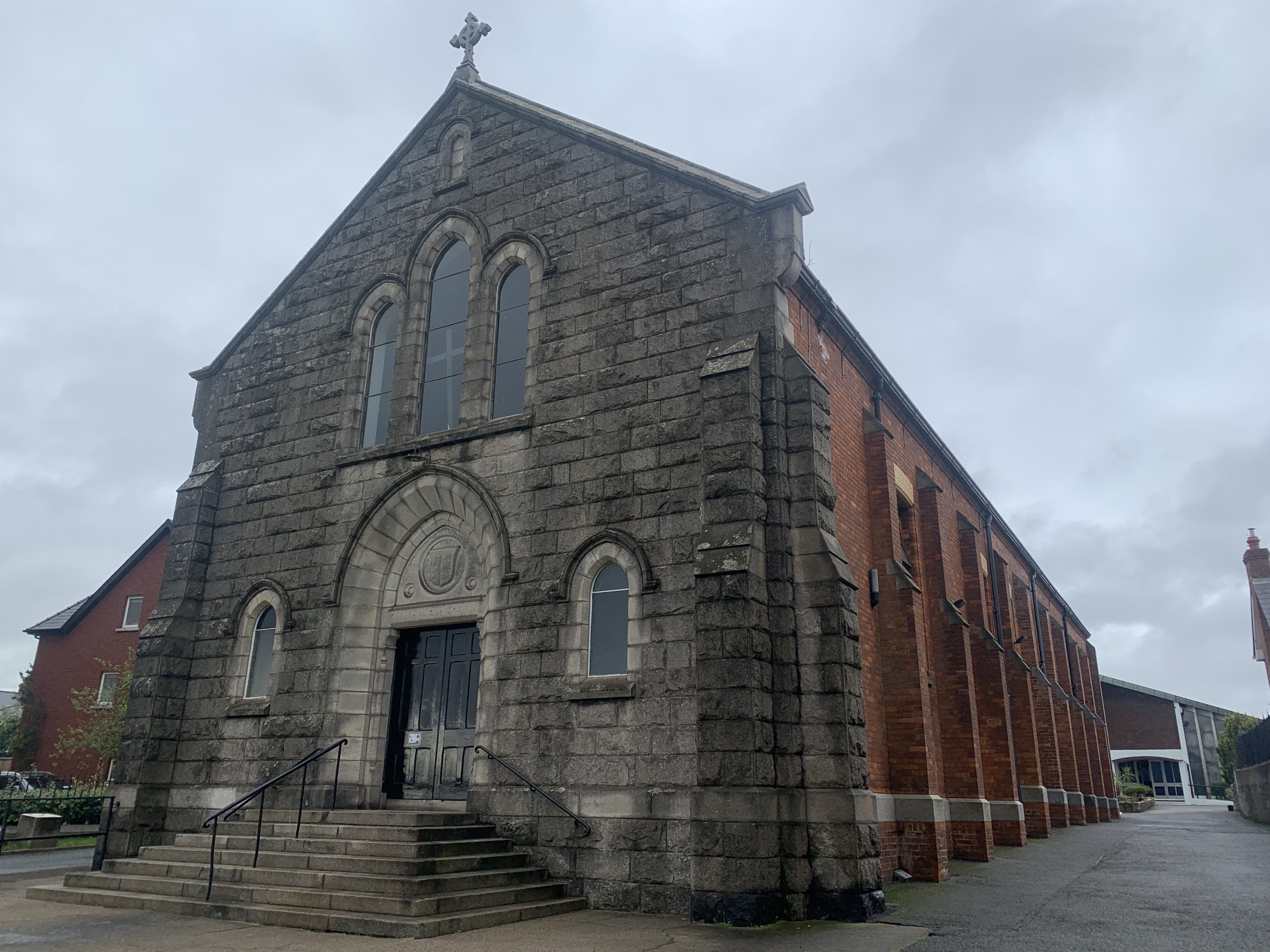
Clontarf Town Hall (now St Anthony's Hall)

The districts of Clontarf, Dollymount and Ballybough, in the barony of Coolock and the county of Dublin, were joined to form a township governed by town commissioners under the Clontarf Township Act 1869. The town commissioners commissioned Clontarf Town Hall (now St Anthony's Hall) which was completed in 1896. The area became an urban district under the Local Government (Ireland) Act 1898. In 1900, the urban district was abolished and the area was transferred from the county into the jurisdiction of the city of Dublin.

It is one of the main components of the Clontarf local electoral area for elections to Dublin City Council.

Clontarf is in the Dáil constituency of Dublin Bay North for national elections.

== Points of note ==
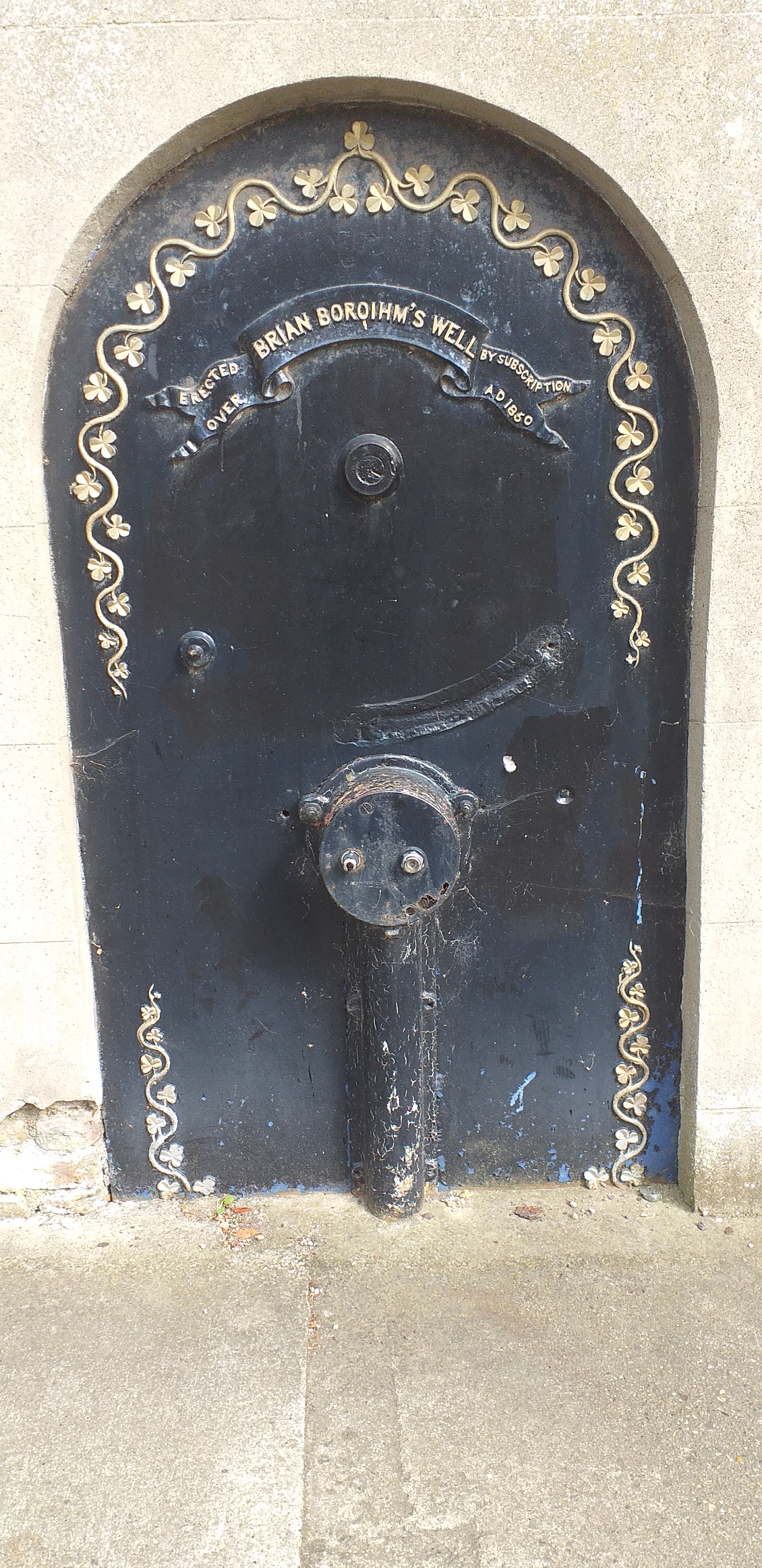
"Brian Boru's well" on Castle Avenue

On Castle Avenue is a water outlet in a wall, believed locally to be from the spring known as Brian Boru's well, reputed to be the one mentioned in accounts of the Battle of Clontarf, where Brian Boru's men refreshed themselves during the battle.

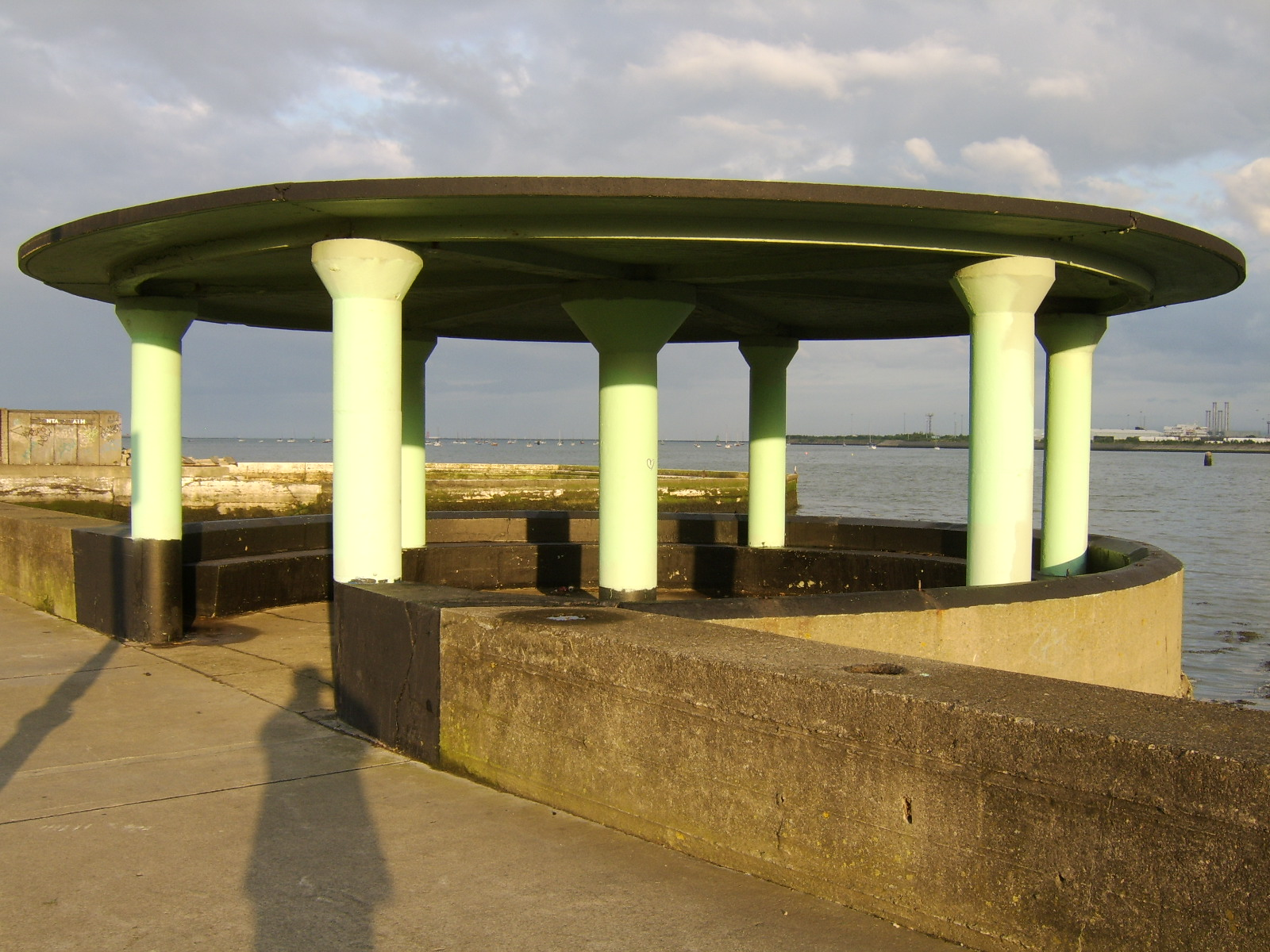
Rain shelter over site of former lead mine

Clontarf was the original home of the Grove Social Club disco which ran from 1967 to 1997. It started in 1967 in Mount Prospect Avenue in Clontarf, Belgrove Football Club (from which the social club got its name). It moved to St. Pauls College, Sybil Hill Road, Raheny, in 1975 when the old pavilion was burnt down.

Along the coastal promenade, there is a circular rain shelter, which forms a cap over a former lead mine, which ran out under the shallow waters of the bay, as recorded in Cosgrave's "North Dublin"; it was closed due to persistent flooding.

== People ==
- Sharon Ní Bheoláin, presenter, lives in Clontarf
- Harry Boland and Gerald Boland, revolutionaries, lived at 15 Marino Crescent in the early 20th century
- Richie Boucher, former Bank of Ireland chief executive
- Gerry Breen, politician, former Lord Mayor of Dublin
- Sharon Commins, aid worker who was kidnapped in Sudan in July 2009, was born and lived in Clontarf
- Maria Doyle, actress, born in Clontarf
- Joe Duffy, broadcaster and presenter
- Ciara Ní É, broadcaster and poet
- Barry Fitzgerald (real name William Shields) and his brother, Arthur Shields, lived at 13 Vernon Avenue; Barry Fitzgerald also lived on Seaview Avenue
- Paddy Glackin, fiddler
- Bernadette Greevy, mezzo-soprano singer
- Arthur Griffith, the founder of Sinn Féin. In 1968 a plaque was erected at his former domicile on St. Lawrence Road.
- Arthur Edward Guinness, 1st Baron Ardilaun, of Guinness brewing fame, was born in St. Anne's House (the house lies in the Clontarf part of the estate, while the majority of the park is in Raheny), as was his elder brother Edward Cecil Guinness, 1st Earl of Iveagh.
- Cian Healy, Irish rugby international
- Neil Jordan, went to school in the area (he was born in Rosses Point, County Sligo), lived on Victoria Road
- Emmett J. Scanlan, actor, grew up in Clontarf
- Ray Kennedy, RTÉ journalist & newscaster
- Declan Kiberd, academic
- Phil Lynott, of Thin Lizzy, musician, lived at 28 Castle Avenue.
- Jack McCaffrey, Dublin Gaelic footballer and winner of several All-Ireland's and All-Stars
- Noel McCaffrey, former All-Star Dublin Gaelic footballer and All-Ireland Senior Football Championship medal winner
- Sarah McCaffrey, Dublin Gaelic Footballer and All Ireland Winner
- Christy O'Connor Snr, professional golfer
- Brian O'Driscoll, former Ireland rugby captain
- Maureen Potter, actress and comedian who lived in Fairview and Clontarf until her death in 2004; buried in the St John the Baptist cemetery on Castle Avenue, with her gravestone reading "In Loving Memory...Super Trouper"
- John Rawson, Viscount Clontarf, a leading statesman in the reign of Henry VIII, last Prior of the local branch of the Order of St. John of Jerusalem
- Jim Ronayne, former Dublin Gaelic footballer and All-Ireland Senior Football Championship medal winner
- Gerry Ryan, RTÉ DJ, grew up in Clontarf, lived on Kincora Avenue, and during his married life, on Castle Avenue
- Erwin Schrödinger, Austrian physicist, moved to Dublin c. 1938 and lived on Kincora Road. There is a commemoration plaque at his former residence.
- John Stafford, Former Lord Mayor of Dublin lives in Clontarf
- Bram Stoker, author of Dracula, was born at 15 Marino Crescent in 1847
- Marty Whelan- DJ and presenter

== See also ==
- List of towns and villages in Ireland
