= St Paul's College, Raheny =

Secondary school in Dublin, Ireland

St Paul's College
- Coláiste Naomh Pól
- Collegium Sancti Pauli
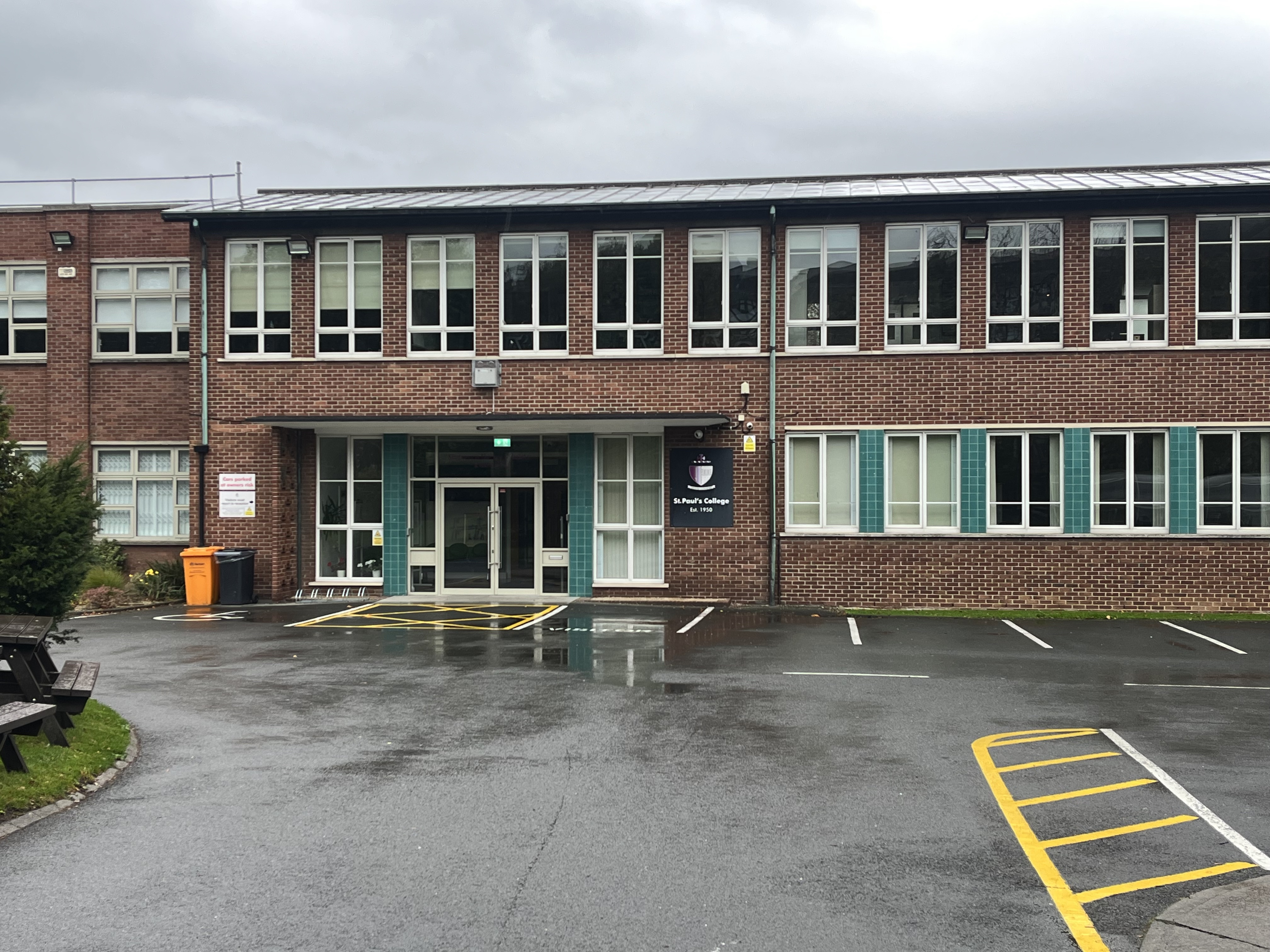

Location
- Raheny, Dublin 5 Ireland; 53.37304°N 6.19328°W

Information
- Motto: Gestis Censere (Latin By your deeds shall you be known)
- Religious affiliation: Christianity
- Denomination: Roman Catholic (following a "Vincentian" ethos)
- Established: 1950 (76 years ago)
- Principal: Sean Moran
- Staff: 40
- Enrollment: ≈600
- Religious order: Vincentian Fathers
- Website: stpaulscollege.ie

St Paul's College in Raheny, Dublin, Ireland, is a Roman Catholic secondary school for boys under the trusteeship of the Vincentian Fathers, formally the Congregation of the Mission. Founded in 1950, it is one of two Vincentian schools for boys in Dublin.

== Operations ==
The school reported they had approximately 500 schoolboys as of 2021, and they prepare them for the Irish Junior Cycle and the Leaving Certificate final examinations and assessments.

Teaching support facilities include two computer rooms, four science laboratories, a technical graphics room, and a woodwork room. The school has a music department and school choir, which performs a Christmas carol service and a summer concert each year. Senior students perform in the school's annual musical.

== Governance ==
The school is overseen by a board of management, appointed by the trustees, the Vincentian Fathers, a member of the Vincentian Family of Roman Catholic religious institutes. It comprises representatives of the trustees, parents, and teaching staff. Operations and teaching are directed by the Principal, assisted by the Deputy Principal.

The school was originally led by a President, assisted by a Dean. Former principal teachers at the school have included: Fr Walshe, Fr Lyne, Dominic McQuillan, Ciaran McCormack, Michael Behan and Sean Moran.

== History ==
=== The site ===
St Paul's College, was developed on the a site at Sybil Hill, a location on the border of Raheny and Clontarf, which was formerly the residence of Reverend Benjamin Plunket, the retired Church of Ireland Bishop of Meath who was the nephew of the 1st Earl of Iveagh and Lady Ardilaun from whom he inherited the entire Saint Anne's estate. Unable to afford to keep the large estate, Plunket kept Sybil Hill House and about 30 acres of park, and sold the remainder of the estate, valued using the Compulsory Purchase Order process, to Dublin Corporation. The Corporation developed it, about half each as public park and housing, with small pieces used to assist in school provision.

=== Foundation and lands ===
Archbishop John Charles McQuaid requested the Vincentian order to open a school for boys in Raheny, which was a population growth area, and after some discussion, the order agreed to do so. They bought some 31 acres of the former St Anne's estate from Dublin Corporation in 1948, and then, in 1950, completed a purchase of Sybil Hill House and lands from Bishop Plunket's son, and were able to open the school on a limited basis in Sybil Hill House, that year.

Additional lands were purchased from Dublin Corporation, in 1952 for 2,400 pounds, partly to compensate for lands sold to allow the city authorities to form Sybil Hill Road, and in 1953 in a land swap for a net 256 pounds, and the last major addition to the college estate was the purchase of nearby Maryville House and four acres of land in 1959. Maryville was demolished and playing fields laid out on its lands.

Sybil Hill House was dedicated to Vincentian order administration and the accommodation of retired priests.

=== Later history ===
Following the burning down of the Belgrove Football Club pavilion in Clontarf in 1975, the college gymnasium became the venue for the Grove Social Club until it ceased operations in 1997.

== Sports and grounds ==
Pupils play rugby, soccer, Gaelic football, hurling, basketball, golf, and athletics.

The school had grounds of over 180 acres (730,000 m^{2}), including all-weather grass pitches and grass playing fields. The sports grounds of the college were also used by local sports clubs such as Clontarf Gaelic football and hurling teams, and Belgrove Football Club, as well as other teams.

=== St. Paul's Swimming Pool ===
St Paul's College had a swimming pool on its lands, which was run both for the school and as a public facility, with pay-as-you-go admission available at certain times. The pool was closed on 31 August 2006, despite Dublin City Council offering financial support in recognition of its availability for public use, to help with repairs to the pool. The statements from the Vincentians that there was no plan to sell, was deemed disingenuous by some, since the land was sold for development, which was completed, with apartments constructed.

=== The playing fields and development plans ===
It was announced in 2015 that the Vincentian Fathers planned to sell half the college land for development, and they were sold to Crekav Trading, part of the Marlet property group, in 2017. The lands were zoned "to protect and provide for institutional and community use." The developer applied for re-zoning and for planning permission to develop on the lands, which resulted in multiple legal battles over several years and public demonstrations against re-zoning and development. In 2017 the developer stopped sports clubs using the pitches and stopped cutting the grass.

Light-bellied Brent geese also use St. Paul’s playing pitches at St. Anne's for feeding and wintering as part of their migration pattern, which some contended should make development on the playing fields illegal under EU Habitats Directive. Planning was applied for, granted on appeal by An Bord Pleanála, but refused by the same body after a judicial review, and new plans were approved in March 2020. In May 2021, the High Court overturned a Bord Pleanála decision and another attempt to clear building on the fields. In 2022 Dublin City Council rezoned the lands from "Z15 - institutional and community use" to "Z9 - recreational use", which could block further plans for residential use.

2022 also saw plans announced for the sale and development of Sybil Hill House (now a Vincentian administration centre) and nearby lands, at the northern side of the school.

== Order facilities ==
Within the grounds of St Paul's is the administrative centre for the Vincentians in Ireland and the order's Provincial, the superior for the province that includes Ireland, resides there.

== Notable alumni ==
- Ivor Callely - Former politician
- Mick Clohisey - Long distance runner and Olympian
- P.J. Gallagher - Comedian and radio presenter
- Seán Haughey - Politician
- Neil Jordan - Award-winning writer and film director
- Paul Anthony McDermott - Barrister, academic and media personality
- Gerry Ryan - Radio broadcaster
- Marty Whelan - TV and radio presenter
- George Birmingham - Judge
- Declan Kiberd - University professor and writer
- Damien Kiberd - Journalist
- Mick Fitzpatrick - Irish Rugby international
- Kevin Mays - Irish Rugby international
- Frank Ennis - Irish Rugby international
