= River Tolka =

River of Counties Meath and Dublin, Ireland

River Tolka Irish: An Tulcha
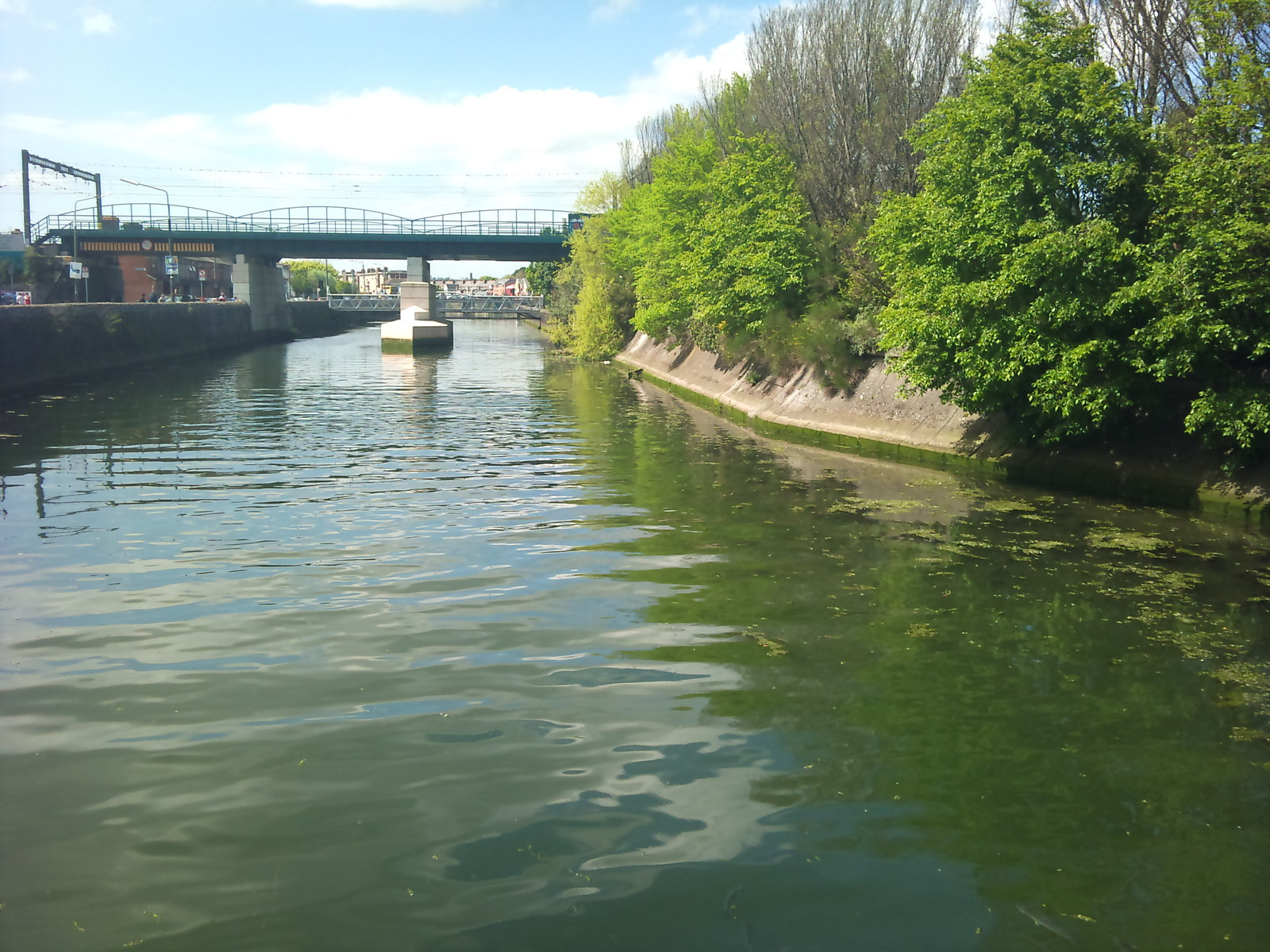

Physical characteristics
- Source
  - location: County Meath, near Dunshaughlin
- Mouth
  - location: Dublin Bay between western Clontarf and East Wall

The River Tolka (/ˈtɔːlkə/; Irish: An Tulcha, "the flood"), also once spelled Tolga, is one of Dublin's three main rivers, flowing from County Meath to Fingal within the old County Dublin, and through the north of Dublin city, Ireland (the other main rivers are the Liffey and the Dodder). By flow of water, the Tolka is the second largest river in Dublin, following the Liffey, but runs more slowly than the Dodder.

== Course and system ==
The Tolka rises east of Dunshaughlin, County Meath, and by-passes Dunboyne, from where it receives the Castle Stream tributary. From Clonee, where it is joined by the Clonee Stream at the eastern end of the village, it flows into County Dublin.

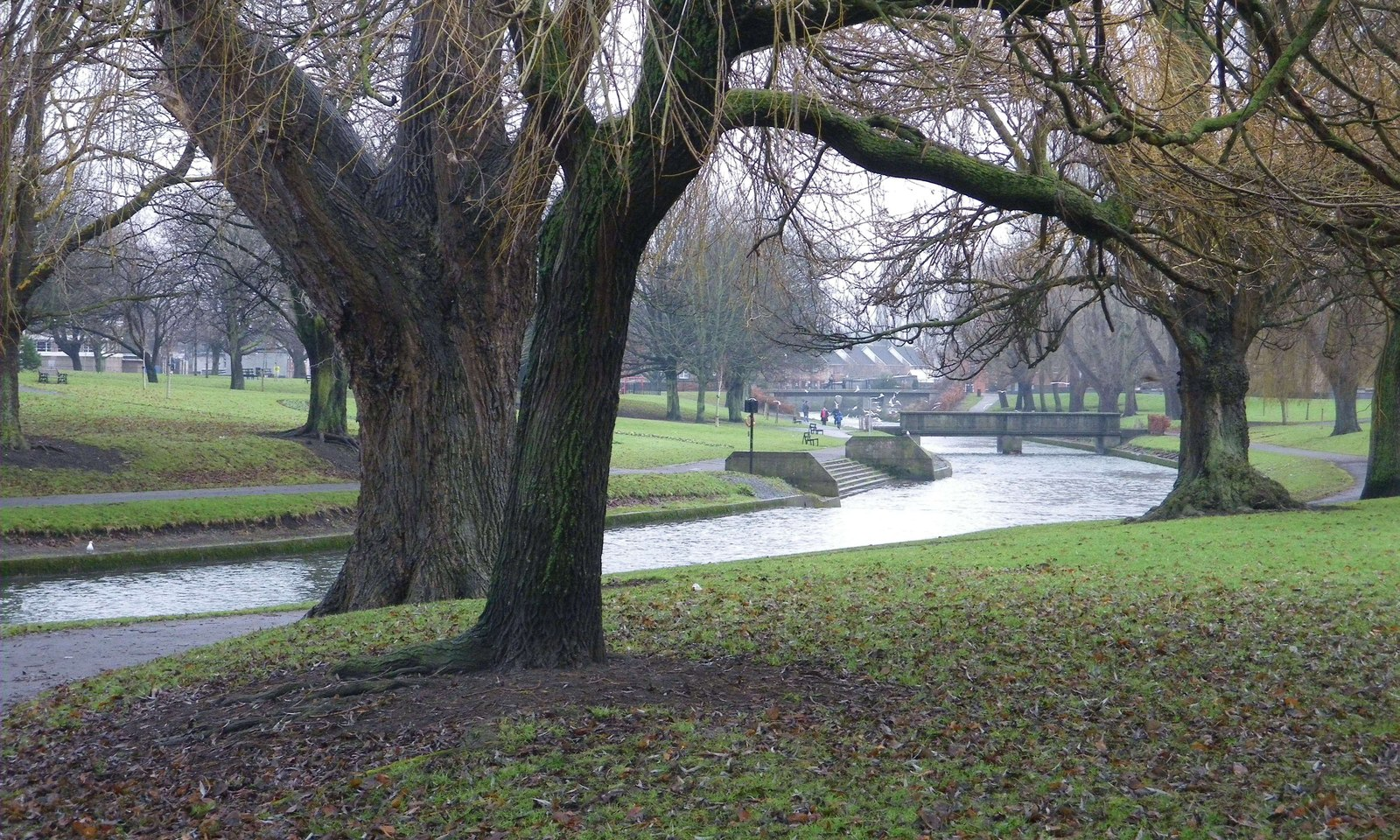
The Tolka passes an old swimming place in Griffith Park, Drumcondra

The river continues through Damastown and Mulhuddart, Blanchardstown, and Ashtown (southwest of Finglas), and the southern edges of Finglas itself, and then the north Dublin suburban districts of Glasnevin and Drumcondra where it comes closest to the Royal Canal near Binn's Bridge. At the southern side of Tolka Park it forms the border between Ballybough and Fairview, Fairview and North Strand, before entering Dublin Bay between East Wall and Clontarf.

=== Tributaries ===
The Tolka has many tributaries, the first major one being the Castle Stream at Dunboyne, then it's the Clonee Stream East of Clonee, which both fall within the borders of County Meath. There are at least fourteen infalls within Dublin City boundaries (the count is complicated by connections with the Wad River system).

Fingal County Council area tributaries include the East and West Pinkeen Streams, and another waterway in semi-rural Dublin. While Dublin City Council area tributaries include the Scribblestown Stream (visible from Abbotstown to past Dunsink), the Finglaswood (or Mount Olivat) Stream from around Cappagh, the Finglas River (joined by a stream from St. Margaret's Road), the Claremont Stream which joins the Tolka near Bon Secours Hospital, the Cemetery Drain (so-called as it runs near Glasnevin Cemetery) before joining the Tolka just past the Botanic Gardens, the Hamstead Stream (from the area now occupied by Hamstead Park and DCU), inflowing somewhat downstream of Mobhi Bridge, and a small stream from around St. Patrick's Teacher Training College, Drumcondra.

The last few tributaries connect to the tidal part of the Tolka, or its estuary, but have been confused by the merging of natural watercourses and city drainage lines. There are at least four such watercourses, including the multi-branched water sometimes called the "Grace Park Stream", another sometimes "Middle Arch Stream" and the Marino Stream.

=== Water quality ===
In 1973, historian Michael J. Tutty wrote of the Finglas River tributary that it was named from the Irish Fiona Glass meaning a clear stream, "...but in the occasional glimpse one can get of the stream now-a-days it is far from clear. The river Tolka itself for miles in either direction is in a filthy condition and our "clear stream" in joining it carries even more dangerous pollution into an already poisonous flow of water".

=== Wad River connections ===
The Wad River system, coming from north Ballymun, interconnects with the Tolka, most notably via a link with the Claremont Stream, and with the Wad River Diversion, which flows along Ballymun Road and Glasnevin Avenue (the Wad's main outfall to the sea is at Clontarf, not far east from the Tolka's mouth).

=== Parks and green spaces ===
The path of the river through Dublin takes it through a number of parks. It passes initially through the Tolka Valley Linear Park near Blanchardstown, then between trees north of River Road, then along the southern edge of the Tolka Valley Park in the western City Council area, where it receives a tributary which provides the source of water for a pond featuring considerable birdlife, including swans, ducks and herons. A large landscaped pitch and putt facility operated by Dublin City Council is situated on the southern side of the park, just south of the meandering river.

The river then flows past the tree-lined recreational areas adjacent to Glasnevin Woods and Violet Hill and forms the northern boundary of Glasnevin (Prospect) Cemetery before meeting the National Botanic Gardens. The river forms the northern border of the Botanic Gardens except for the beautiful Rose Gardens situated on the northern side and accessed via a bridge. Thereafter it passes Glasnevin village and flows into Griffith Park where it forms a major feature of the park. Continuing on past Our Lady's Park, Drumcondra and under Frank Flood Bridge (previously known as 'Drumcondra Bridge'), the river runs behind housing, and the green spaces at the Archbishop's Palace and Clonliffe College, before coming to Ballybough. Below Annesley Bridge at Fairview, around which was originally the river mouth, before reclamation, it runs beyond one last green space, Fairview Park, and turns to reach the sea between East Wall and western Clontarf.

== Flooding ==
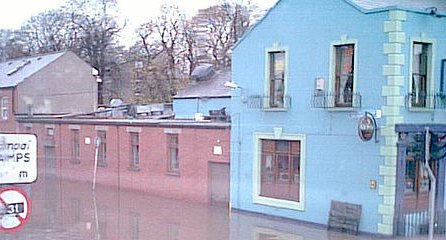
Flooding from the Tolka at Drumcondra, Dublin, in April 2005.

The river floods infrequently but with occasional severity. It is not "flashy" like the Dodder but builds up over a period. Notable floods occurred in October 1880, December 1954, November 1965, August 1986 (Hurricane Charley), November 2000, November 2002, January and April 2005, August 2008 and October 2011; those of 1954 and 2002 were the most severe.

=== 1954 floods ===
In early December 1954, the River Tolka flooded areas in Glasnevin, Drumcondra, Fairview, Ballybough, North Strand and East Wall. North Strand was particularly badly hit, and it became known as the Great North Strand Flood. The heavy rainfall began on 8 December 1954, with the emergency services deploying boats to rescue residents from Botanic Avenue, the Richmond Road, Grace Park Avenue, and the wider North Strand area. The spring tide happened at 12:40am on the morning of 9 December, seeing the river burst its banks at 1:30am and led to the Great Northern Railway Board railway bridge which carried the Belfast line at East Wall Road being swept away at 4:30am. The debris from the collapsed bridge blocked the river and exacerbated the local flooding. There were 2 fatalities: one elderly woman died in her flooded home in St Bridget's Cottages, and another died of a heart attack 4 days after her rescue from her home. Fairview Park was completely flooded. In the North Strand area, the flood water was up to 4 feet deep. 400 residents were evacuated. The Irish Press called it "the worst day following the worst night in memory". A number of animals died as a result of the flooding, including 12 cows, a donkey, a pig, and pups and poultry.

As a result, the mouth of the River Tolka was widened east of Annesley Bridge a number of years later. This helped to restore the flow of the river which had been affected by the reclamation of the sloblands. The railway bridge was eventually replaced with a Bailey Bridge.

=== 2002 floods ===
In November 2002, flooding caused extensive damage to residential areas along the Tolka banks. After this, much work was done to strengthen the river's flood defences, and following heavy flooding in 2005, major works to deepen and widen the river were carried out on a number of stretches most notably at Glasnevin Woods and at Drumcondra Bridge. Controversially, the small natural waterfall at Glasnevin Woods was replaced by an artificial stepped fall.

Analysis of the hydrological conditions giving rise to the 2002 flood showed that the classic conditions for a severe flood in the Tolka occurred, these being winter conditions with heavy rain in the previous days and weeks leading to saturated conditions followed by sustained severe rain over around 48 hours.

== Fauna ==
On 28 September 2011, it was reported in the press that salmon returned to spawn in the River Tolka for the first time in over 100 years.

It was reported in 2013 that an Irish Wildlife Trust survey found otters living along the Tolka. On 22 July 2014, it was reported that a pollution incident had led to a major fish kill on the river. Others of note are regular sightings of kingfisher, bats and grey heron. The river holds a large stock of small wild brown trout. This is topped up a few times a year by the angling club for competitions.

== See also ==
- List of bridges over the River Tolka
- List of rivers of Ireland
- List of rivers of County Dublin

== Sources ==
- Tutty, Michael J. (1 March 1973). "Finglas". Dublin Historical Record. 26 (2). Dublin: Old Dublin Society: 66–73. JSTOR 30082560.

=== Bibliography ===
- Doyle, Joseph W. (2012) [2008]. Ten Dozen Waters: The Rivers and Streams of County Dublin (5th ed.). Dublin, Ireland: Rath Eanna Research. pp. i–iv, 1–50 + photos and map. ISBN 978-0-9566363-4-8.
- Sweeney, Clair L. (1991). The Rivers of Dublin. Dublin, Ireland: Dublin Corporation. pp. 1–115, inc. many maps. ISBN 0-9505301-4-X.
