= 1970 Dublin fires =

Number of fires across the city of Dublin, Ireland

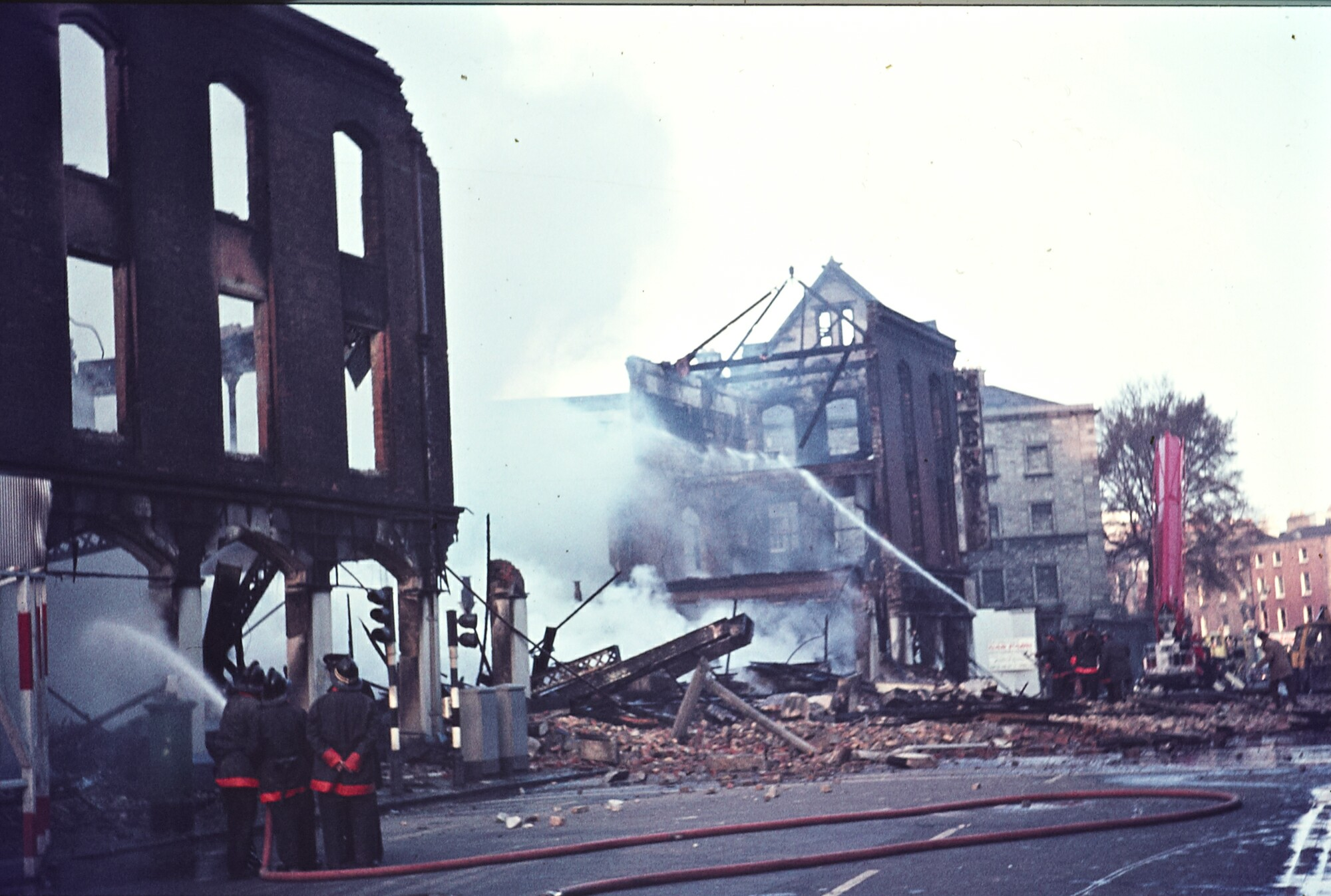
- The aftermath of the fire at the premises of Thomas McKenzie & Sons, Pearse Street
- Date: January 7 – August 16, 1970
- Location: Dublin, Ireland
- Cause: Arson
- Perpetrator: Ulster Volunteer Force (assumed)

The 1970 Dublin fires were a number of arson attacks in Dublin, Ireland in 1970. At the time, the series of fires were rumoured to have been caused by the Ulster Volunteer Force following a threat that was made stating that “Dublin will burn”. Gardaí later stated that they believed that the fires were unrelated to the threats and were most likely the work of arsonists.

== Fires ==
=== Dunnes Stores, Cornelscourt ===
The first fire of the year was on 7 January in the drapery and hardware section of Dunnes Stores in the Cornelscourt Shopping Centre in Cornelscourt causing hundreds of thousands of pounds worth of damage. The Fire Brigade prevented the fire from spreading to the supermarket area. The leader of the Fire Brigade said the fire had started in the roof area and spread rapidly. He said "there were explosions all over the place but nobody knows what caused them". The next day it was announced that Ben Dunne was preparing plans with architects to rebuild the damaged section with a temporary drapery section being created in the undamaged part of the store.

=== Pearse Street ===
A fire on 9 April destroyed the building of Thomas McKenzie & Sons Ltd, a hardware store, on Pearse Street causing damages estimated to be at least £300,000. The land was later sold to a developer for an undisclosed sum.

=== East Wall ===
On 25 June, a fire was lit in the timberyard of James McMahon Ltd, located on East Wall Road, which destroyed a huge stock of timber. The damages caused were reported to be £1 million. Two days later, during the early hours of 27 June, a fire broke out in a diesel storage warehouse, the property of Cassin Diesel Air Transport Ltd, and spread to the adjoining nine shops along Church Road, which were located beside St. Joseph's Church, gutting each one. A block of housing for pensioners called St Mary's Court was built in its place in the mid 1970s.

=== Abbey Street ===
A fire broke out on 26 June in the large warehouses of Holroyd & Jones and Brooks Thomas & Co, a timber store, on Abbey Street at 3am. This was later reported to have been caused by housebreakers. On 13 July, another fire was set in the premises shortly after 8pm. One fireman was seriously injured and was in hospital due to firefighting. Gardaí were searching for three cars, two of which had Northern Ireland registration plates, that were all reportedly seen speeding away from the site after the fire emerged.

=== James's Place East ===
P.J. Matthews & Co. Ltd, a paint store and building providers warehouse located on James's Place East, was set on fire in the early hours of the morning of 2 July. The warehouse was opened in 1950 and employed 100 people at the time of the fire. A man was noticed on the roof of the warehouse before the fire broke out.

=== Shankill ===
The stables and loft of Springfield House, Shankill, the home of Jack Doyle, a bloodstock dealer, were set alight on the night of 13 July. The alarm was raised by Anne Ennis, wife of jockey and trainer Frank Ennis who lived nearby. Doyle felt that this arson attack on his property was malicious, and not an accident.

=== Stephen Street ===
A fire broke out at Moore & Co's garage on Stephen Street, off Aungier Street on the night of 15 July. Concerns amounted when the fears of the fire spreading to the adjacent shopping block of buildings on George's Street and the risk of the underground fuel tanks exploding were realised. The fire was contained after two hours and the damages caused were estimated to be around £20,000 to £30,000.

=== Sheriff Street ===
A block of buildings, including four large warehouses, were set alight during the night of 16 August along Sheriff Street in the North Wall area of north Dublin. Among the affected were the premises of Chadwicks, a building providers and Wiggin's Teape, a paper merchant. Firemen generated a large water barrier to prevent the fire from spreading to the Kosan Gas warehouse which had gas cylinders inside that could have exploded.
