= Griffith Park, Dublin =

Public park in Dublin, Ireland

Griffith Park
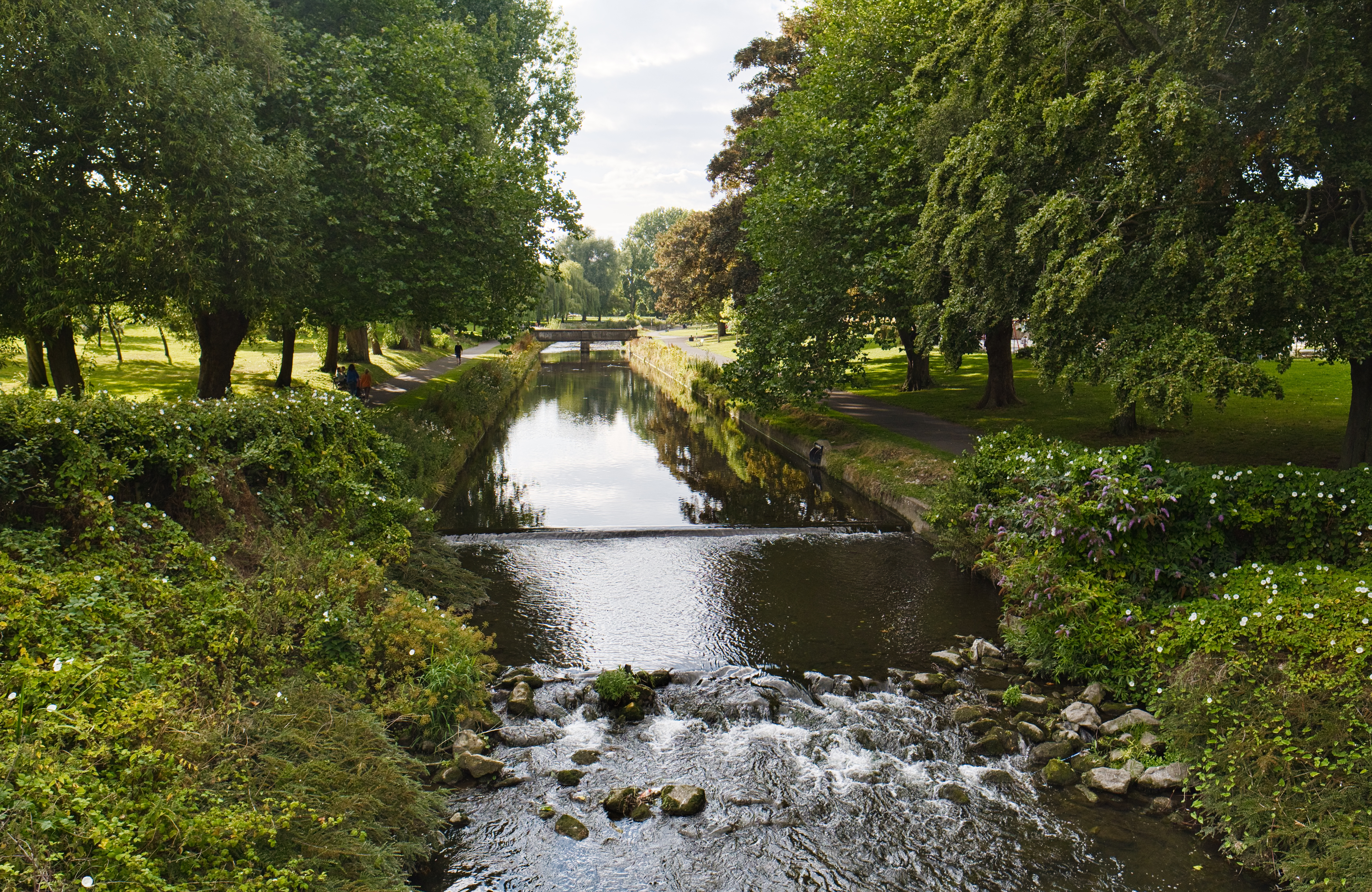
- The River Tolka running through the park

- Location within Dublin Location within Ireland
- Location: between Glasnevin and Drumcondra, Dublin
- Coordinates: 53.3698°N 6.2609°W
- Area: 7.5 hectares (19 acres)
- Created: 1930s
- Operator: Dublin City Council
- Open: All year
- Website: www.dublincity.ie/residential/parks/dublin-city-parks/visit-park/griffith-park

Griffith Park (Irish: Páirc Uí Ghríofa) is a 7.5-hectare (19-acre) park located on the banks of the River Tolka in Dublin city, Ireland between the suburbs of Glasnevin and Drumcondra. The park is a short distance downstream of Ireland's National Botanic Gardens, and upriver of Our Lady's Park, and has been noted by Discover Ireland as "one of the premier north city parks". The park closes at different times of the year, dependent on the hours of dusk.

== History ==
The site was originally a landfill site until the 1930s when the eastern end of the park was first developed. The river the park straddles was realigned in the late 1930s, with further work to provide a paddling pool made in the 1950s. The last section of the park (at the Mobhi Road end) was developed in the mid-1950s. The park is one of two in County Dublin named after Irish politician Arthur Griffith (founder of the political party Sinn Féin), the other being Arthur Griffith Park in Lucan. In the 21st century, works completed by Dublin City Council in the park included a second pedestrian bridge over the Tolka as well as recontouring of its riverside areas to prevent flooding.

== Amenities ==
As of 2023, the park offers visitors lawn areas, picnic tables, pleasant riverside walks, a playground, 2 table-tennis tables, and an outdoor gym. The gym consists of 18 stations on top of a hard-wearing interwoven rubber matting surface. Following a Visual Tree Assessment of trees located in Griffith Park in summer 2020, Dublin City Council advised that 14 horse chestnut trees in the park needed to be removed due to Horse Chestnut Bleeding Canker which made the branches liable to collapse. Due to the prominent position of many of the trees along footpaths within the park they were deemed a serious health and safety issue and felled.

Six entrances exist into the park, from Saint Mobhi Road, Walsh Road, Millmount Avenue, Woodville Road and Botanic Avenue.

Drumcondra Public Library, built in the art deco style, exists to the east of the park.

== Incidents ==
On 10 August 2013, an employee of a security firm contracted by Dublin City Council to provide park wardens stopped two Muslim women from praying in the park. The employee was suspended from work while the firm carried out an internal investigation.

On 21 August 2017, a traffic-calming trial was initiated by Dublin City Council which cut off a short-cut for vehicular traffic between Drumcondra Road and Home Farm Road. For 10 years prior to the initiative, both public representatives and local residents alike had repeatedly asked Dublin City Council to deal with the traffic problems in the area. A Facebook group named 'StoptheroadclosureD9' was set up to raise concerns about the council's handling of the situation, to oppose the measures introduced, and to question the council's monitoring of the trial's success.

== Proposed developments ==
Griffith Park has been noted as a possible stop along MetroLink, Dublin's proposed metro line. The Griffith Park stop would be constructed on the Home Farm football grounds in front of Whitehall College adjacent to the park. Access would be at the corner of the site nearest to Mobhi Road with a BusConnects bus stop close by to facilitate wider connectivity.

== Gallery ==
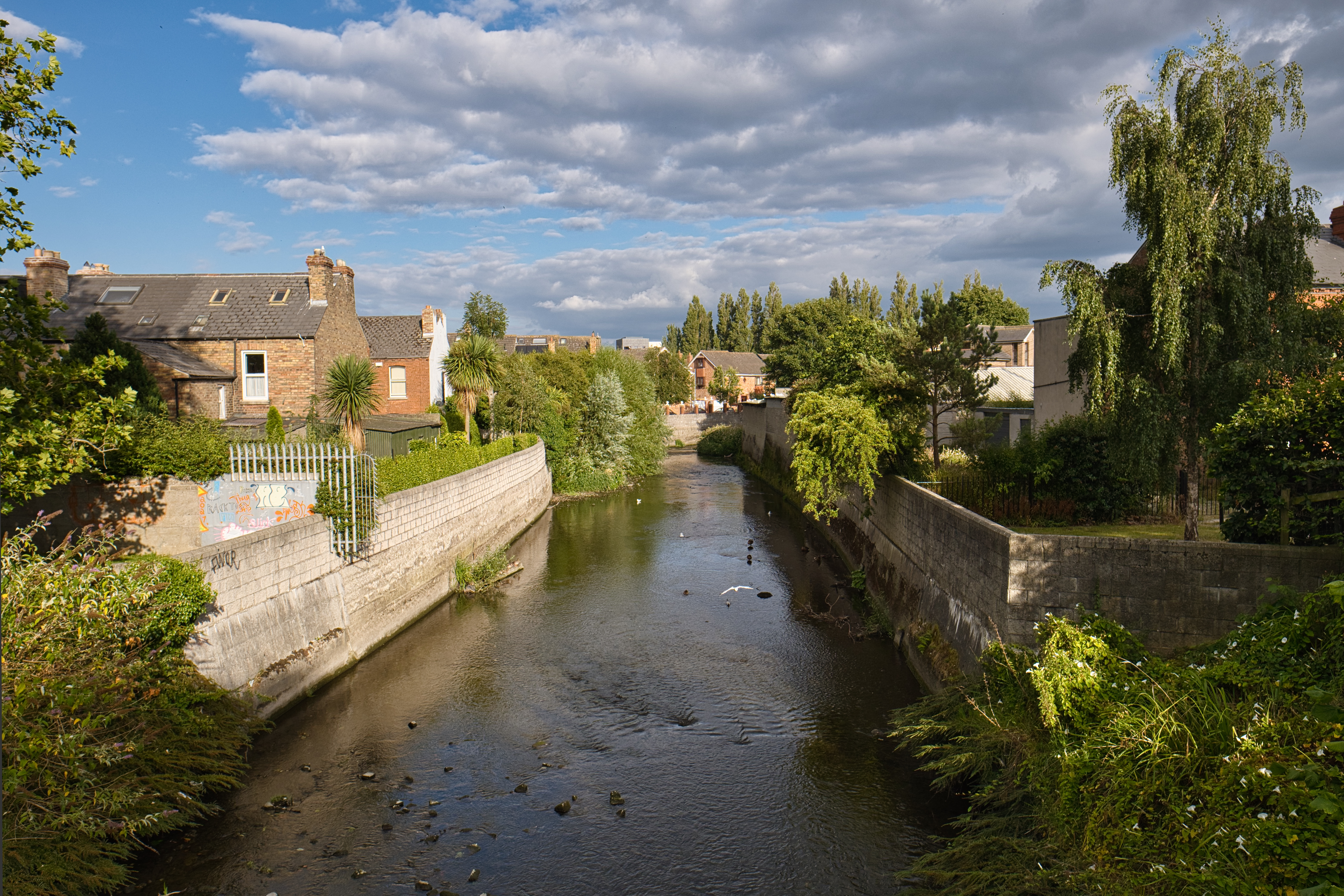
The River Tolka as it exits the eastern end of Griffith Park

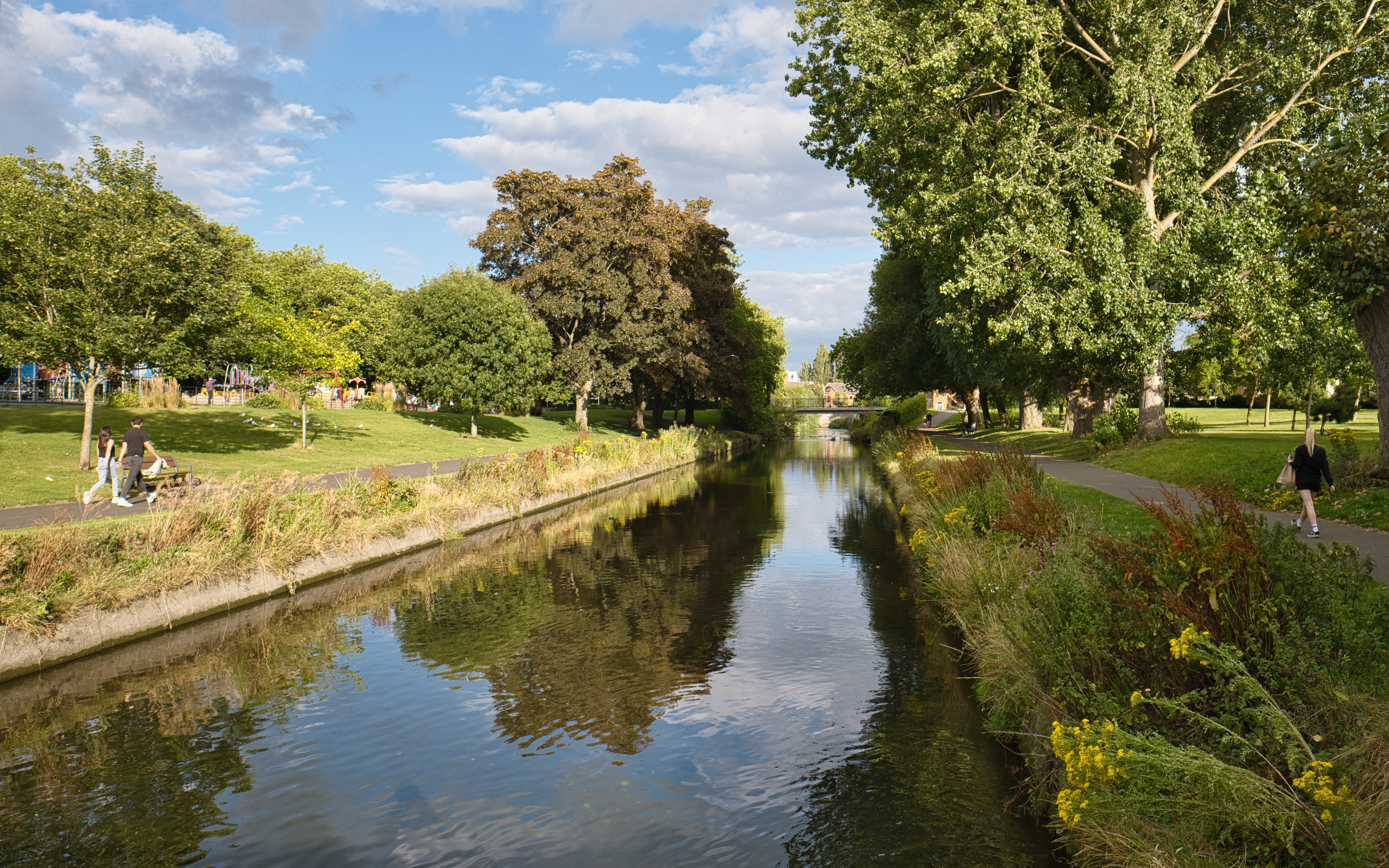
A view of the river

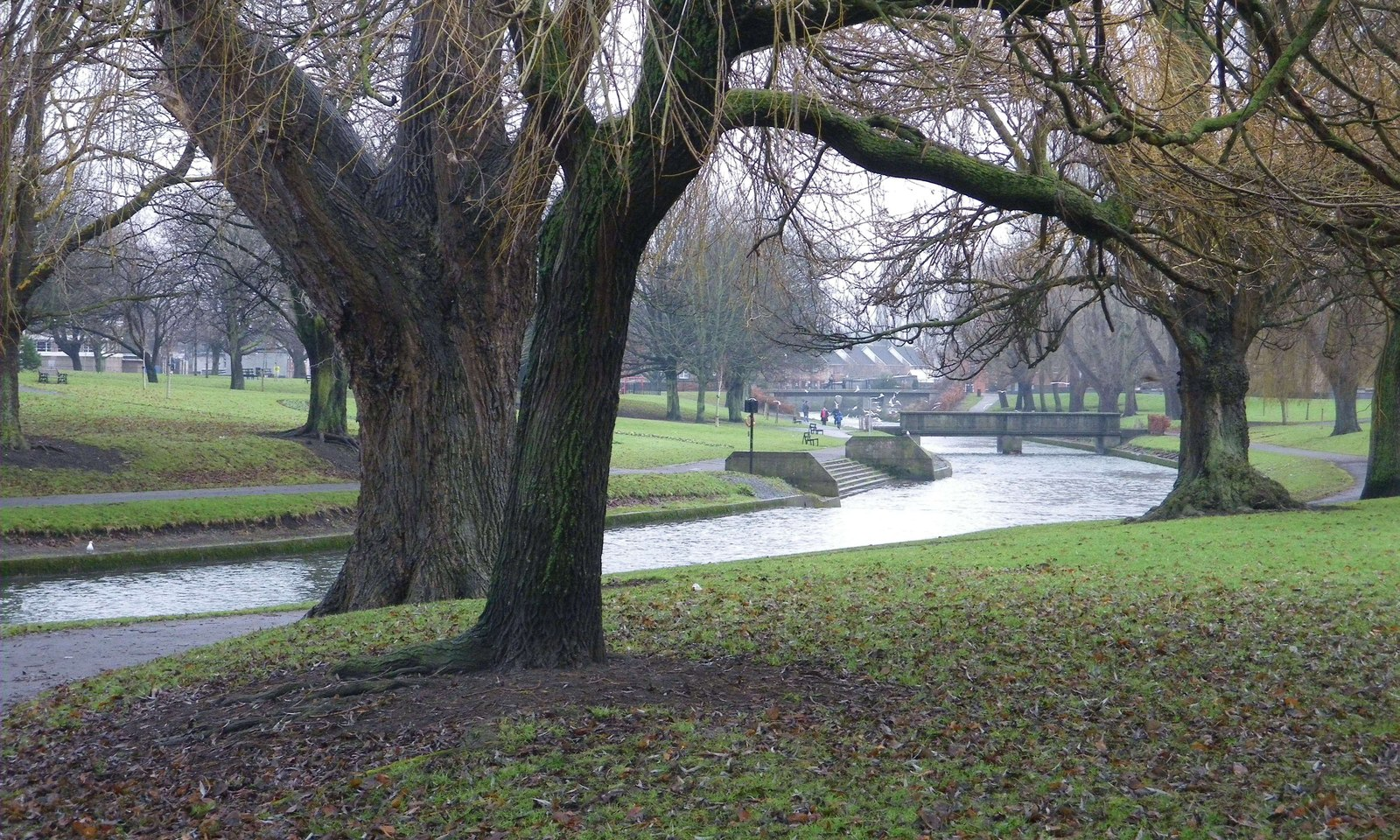
The park in December

== See also ==
- Griffith Avenue, Glasnevin
