= East Wall =

Northern inner city area of Dublin, Ireland

East Wall An Port Thoir (Irish)
- Inner city area
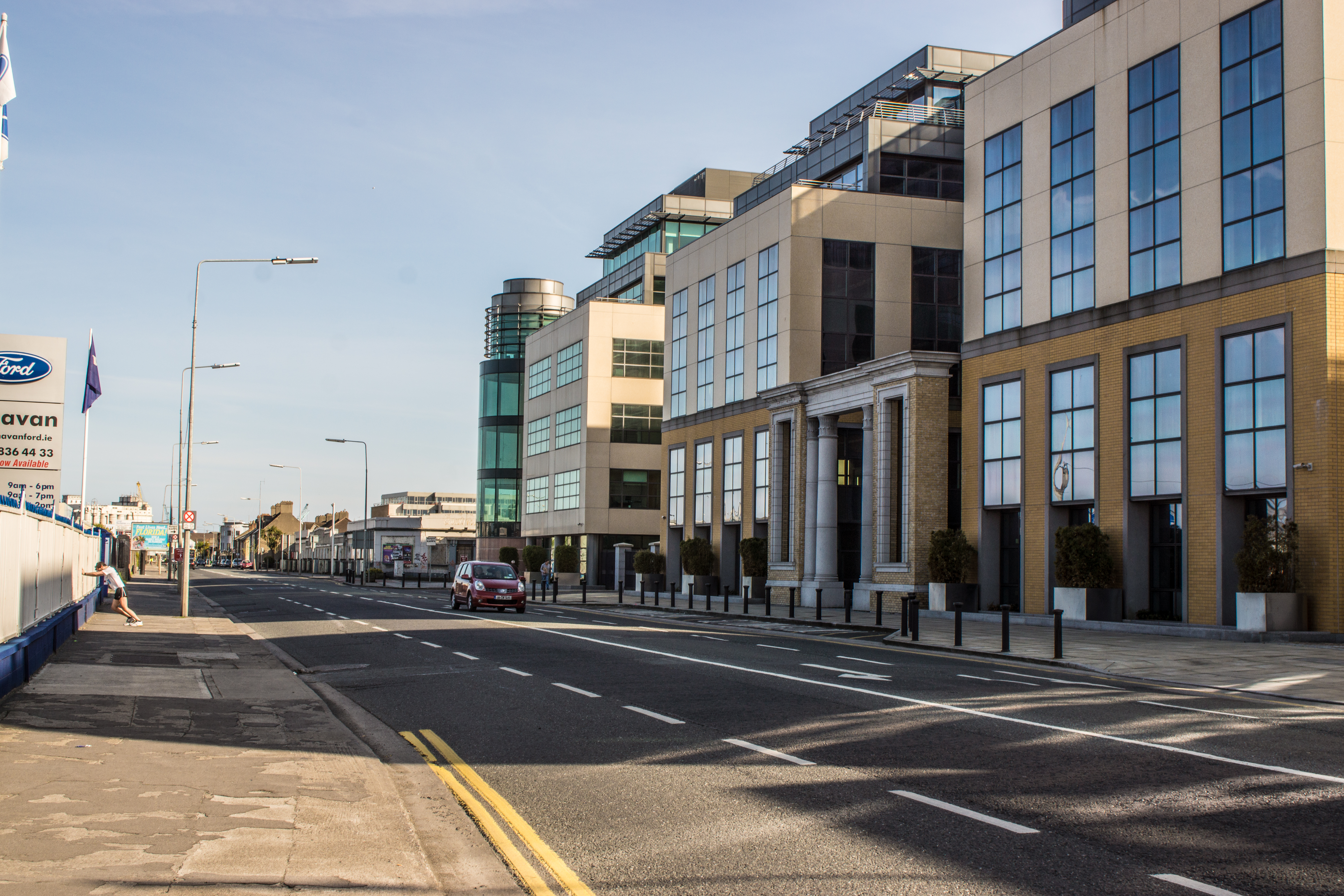
- East Wall Road

- Location within Dublin
- Coordinates: 53.354°N 6.235°W

East Wall (Irish: An Port Thoir) is an inner city area of the Northside of Dublin, Ireland. Built on reclaimed ground in the 1820s, the area is also 30 minutes walk from Dublin's main thoroughfare, O'Connell Street.

== Location ==
East Wall is bounded by West Road to the west, by Sheriff Street Upper to the south, and was bounded by East Wall Road to the north until land reclamation extended that part. It is linked to Ringsend by the East-Link bridge; it is linked to Fairview by Annesley Bridge. The broader region is bounded by Railway lines, the Royal Canal, the River Tolka, the River Liffey and Dublin Port (the Irish Sea), taking in the Dublin Docklands, resulting in a readily identifiable area geographically if somewhat separated from the large city which surrounds it. The southern entrance to the Dublin Port Tunnel is in East Wall.

== History and development ==
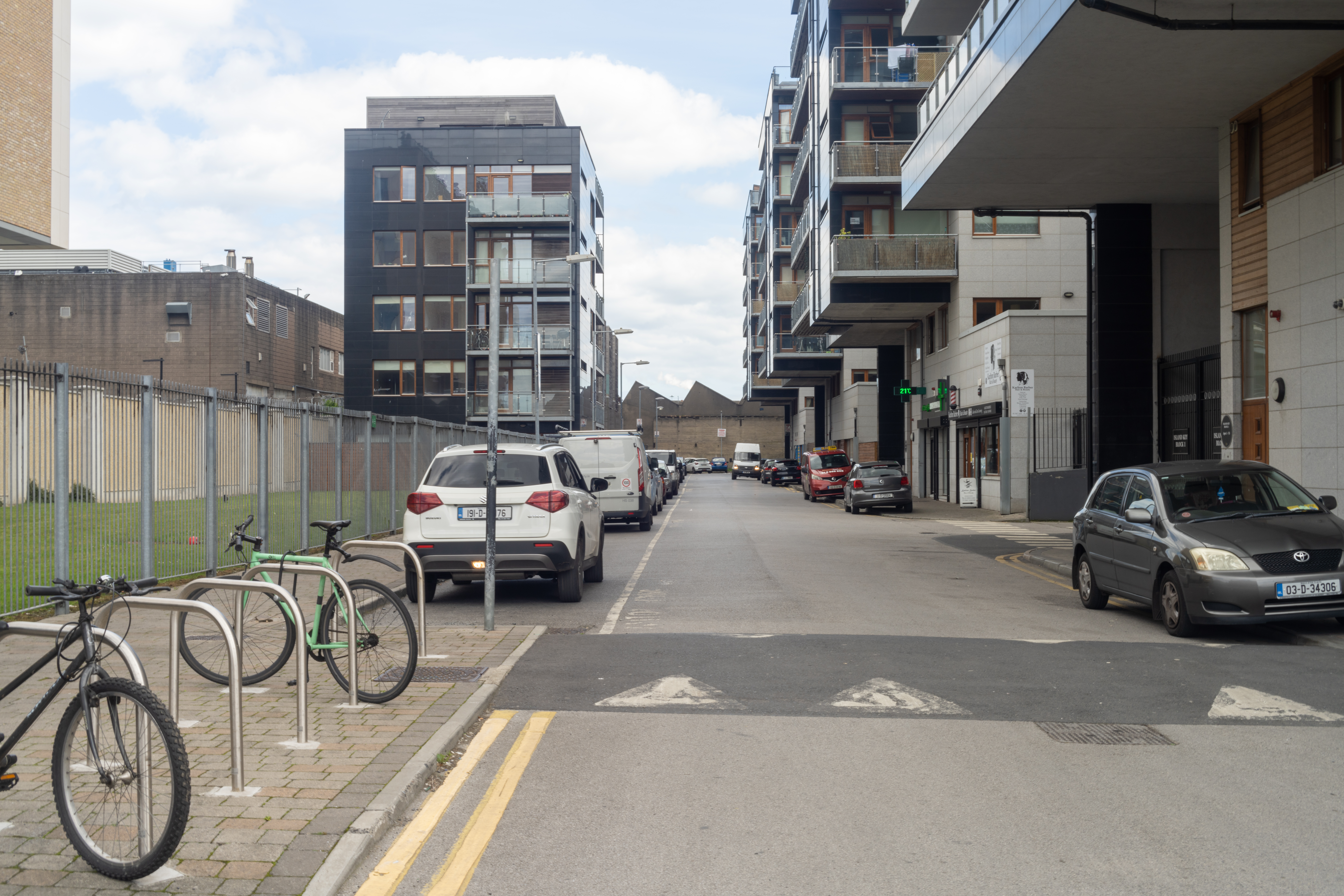
Apartments in East Wall

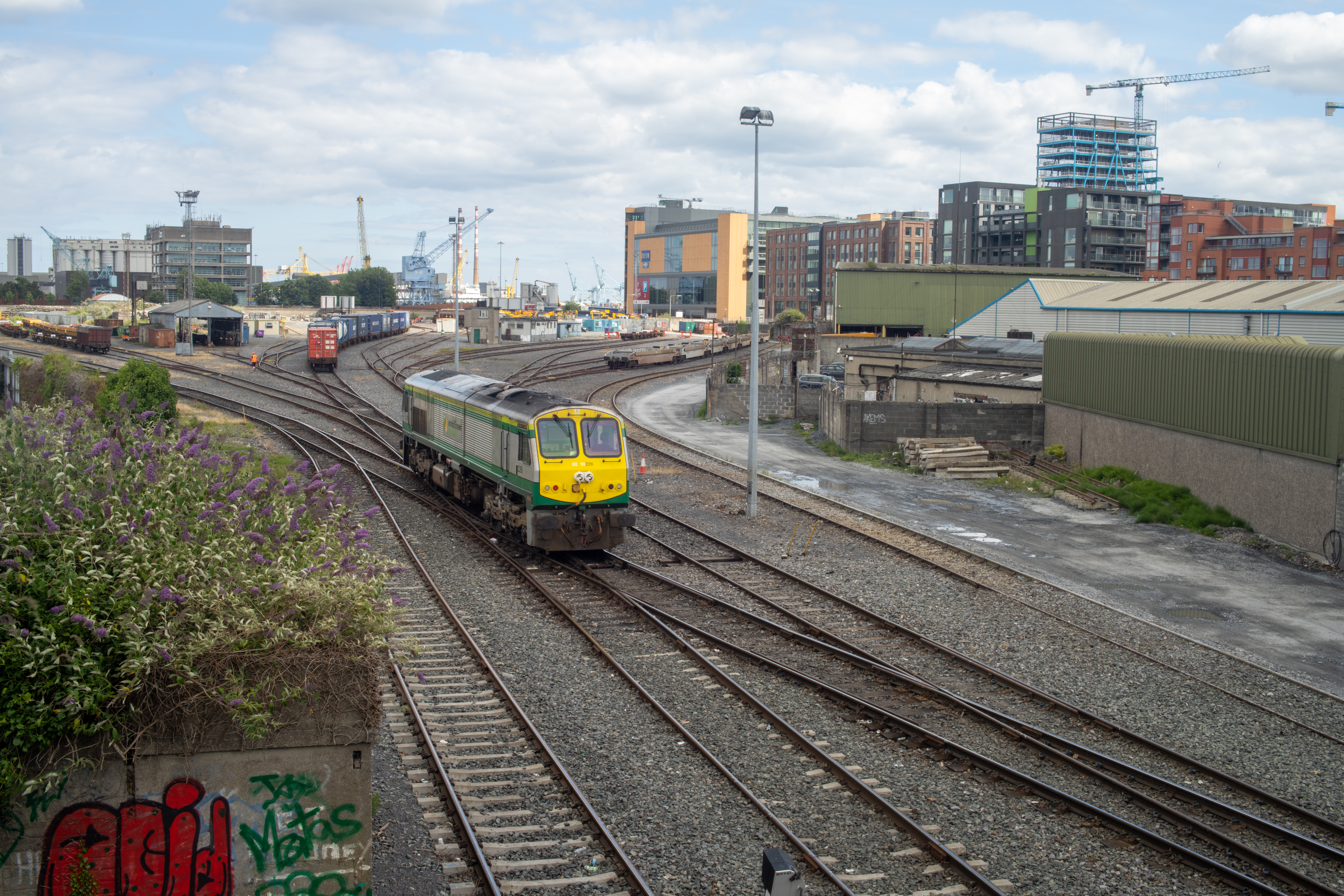
East Wall train yard

East Wall dates from the end of the eighteenth century to the time of the construction of the North Wall. It was originally a working-class area, with many finding employment in Dublin Port, adjacent to the area.

On 25 June 1970, the timberyard of James McMahon on East Wall Road caught on fire causing damages amounting to £1 million and two days later, on 27 June, a diesel store warehouse located beside a block of 9 shops on Church Road was set alight with the fire spreading and gutting each shop. This was part of a series of fires in the city in 1970.

In the economic boom years from the late 1990s onwards, the area developed rapidly, with the notable addition of the International Financial Services Centre (mostly in neighbouring North Wall), and East Point Business Park on reclaimed land extending East Wall to the north. It has developed rapidly since the late 1990s, and in 2013 regained its status as an officially recognised village within the framework of the Dublin City Development Plan. There has been an increase in the population in recent years to over 5,000. It now contains a number of social organisations across cultural, arts & sporting interests, and it has an award-winning community cultural centre, The Sean O'Casey Centre, which is named after one of its most famous past residents, Seán O'Casey. New businesses have located in the area in recent years. It is located close to the port area, the financial district and with ease of access to Dublin airport.

== Amenities ==
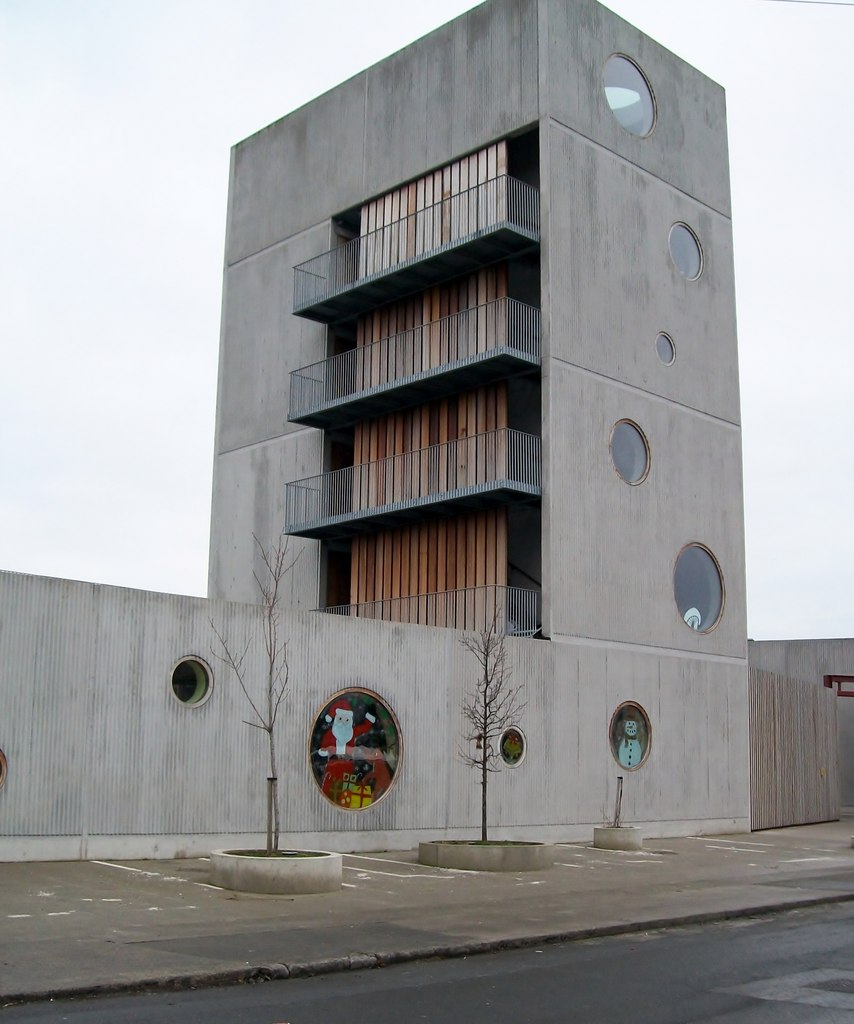
Sean O'Casey Community Centre

East Wall is primarily a residential neighbourhood of around 1,800 households, with a population of approximately 5,000. The area is serviced by shops, St. Joseph's Church, the Sean O'Casey Community Centre, a primary school and recreational facilities (parks, sea and beach) within walking distance. The community centre includes a sports hall, a theatre and a football pitch. St. Barnabas' Church, Dublin would have provided services for Church of Ireland parishioners, such as Seán O'Casey until it closed in 1965 and the parish merged with that of North Strand. There is also a former ESB building which is being used as a transitional shelter for refugees since November 2022, leading to the East Wall protests.

== People ==
- Liam Cunningham, actor.
- Ben Hannigan, footballer.
- Arthur Murphy, broadcaster.
- Jack Nalty, volunteer with the International Brigades, and the last Irishman killed in the Spanish Civil War.
- Roxanna Nic Liam, poet, writer, actor.
- Seán O'Casey, the celebrated playwright, grew up in East Wall.
- Maureen O'Sullivan, an independent TD.
