= Stephen Street, Dublin =

Street in Dublin, Ireland

Stephen Street
- Stephen's Street
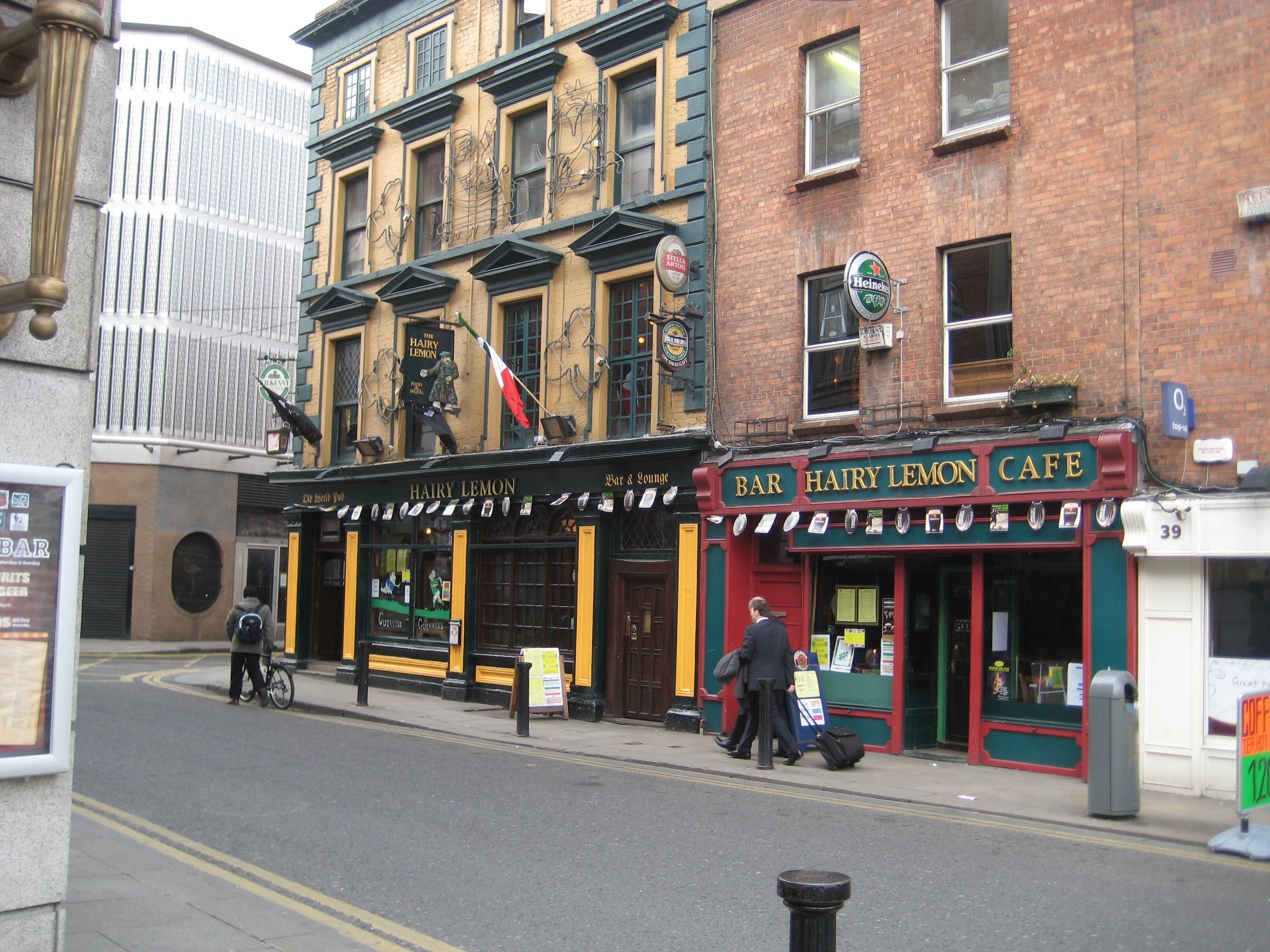
- The Hairy Lemon pub, on Stephen Street Lower

- Location within Central Dublin
- Native name: Sráid Stiabhna (Irish)
- Namesake: Medieval religious foundation named for Saint Stephen
- Length: 300 m (980 ft)
- Width: 10 metres (33 ft)
- Location: Dublin, Ireland
- Postal code: D02
- Coordinates: 53°20′29″N 6°15′54″W
- west end: Golden Lane
- Major junctions: Aungier Street, Drury Street
- east end: Johnson Place

Other
- Known for: pubs, Dunlop factory

Stephen Street (Irish: Sráid Stiabhna) is a street on the southside of Dublin, Ireland.

It is divided into Stephen Street Upper (western part), connecting Golden Lane to Aungier Street, and Stephen Street Lower (eastern part), running from Aungier Street to Johnson Place.

== History ==
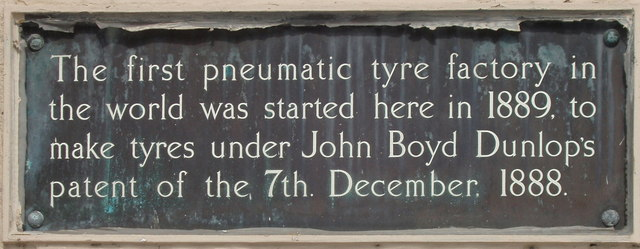
Plaque on the site of the Dunlop Pneumatic Tyre Factory.

=== Medieval Dublin ===
Stephen Street takes its name from the medieval church and later leper hospital of Saint Stephen, located on the site of present-day Mercer's Hospital which was converted from use as a poorhouse around 1709. It was referred to as being used as St Stephen's Hospital from at least 1612. Nearby St Stephen's Green also gets its name from the same source.

The church and churchyard disappeared following the uniting of the parish of St Stephen with that of St Michael Le Pole and St. Bride's to form the new parish of St Brides in 1684.

The street is believed to derive its curved shape from the embankment that stood outside Dublin's city walls in the medieval period; the modern streets still follow the line of this earthen ridge that was built sometime in the 12th or 13th century.

=== Georgian Dublin ===
During the Georgian period, the street formed a major ring road of the city proper and became a fashionable location for city dwellers. Leitrim House, the best surviving 18th-century building on the street was built during this period around 1760.

One of the oldest structures on the street is the Central Dairy at 19 Stephen Street Upper, a two-bay four-storey former house dating to c. 1725. It would have originally had a "Dutch Billy" style roof but was refaced in machine-made brick in c1890.

=== Modern Dublin ===
The Dunlop Pneumatic Tyre Factory, the world's first pneumatic tyre factory, was built in the area in 1889.

A fire broke out at Moore & Co's garage on Stephen Street on 15 July 1970, one of the 1970 arson attacks thought to have been carried out by the Ulster Volunteer Force.

The Leinster School of Music & Drama was based on Stephen Street between 1982 and 1998.

== Notable residents ==
- John Hely - jurist
- John FitzGibbon, 1st Earl of Clare - Attorney General
- Robert Hunter - painter

== Gallery ==
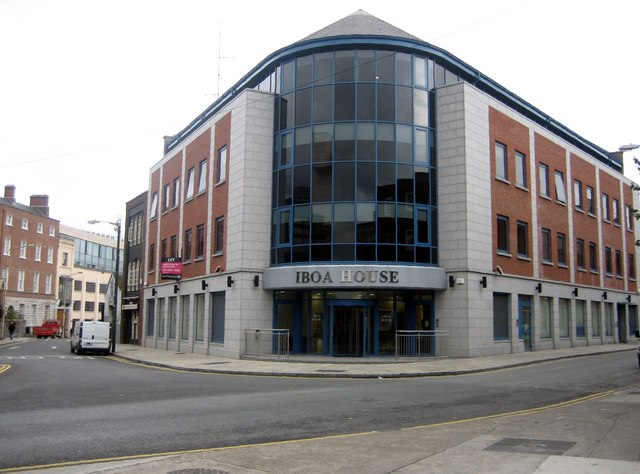
IBOA House, Stephen Street Upper

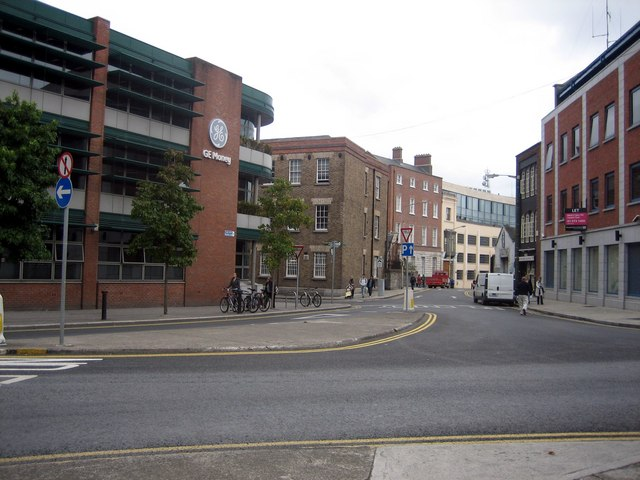
Junction with Golden Lane and Ship Street

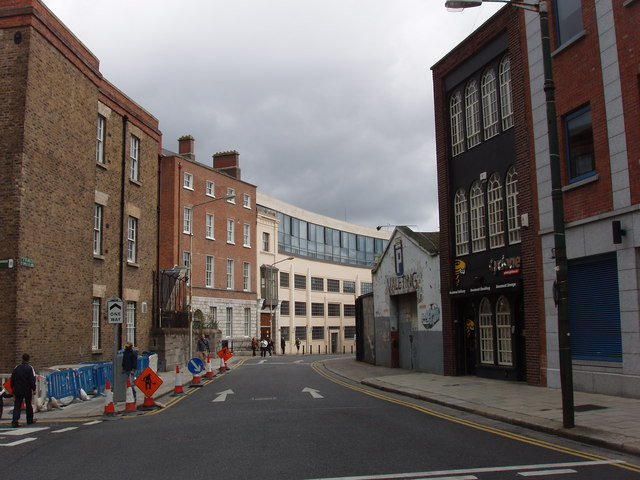
Site of former tyre factory

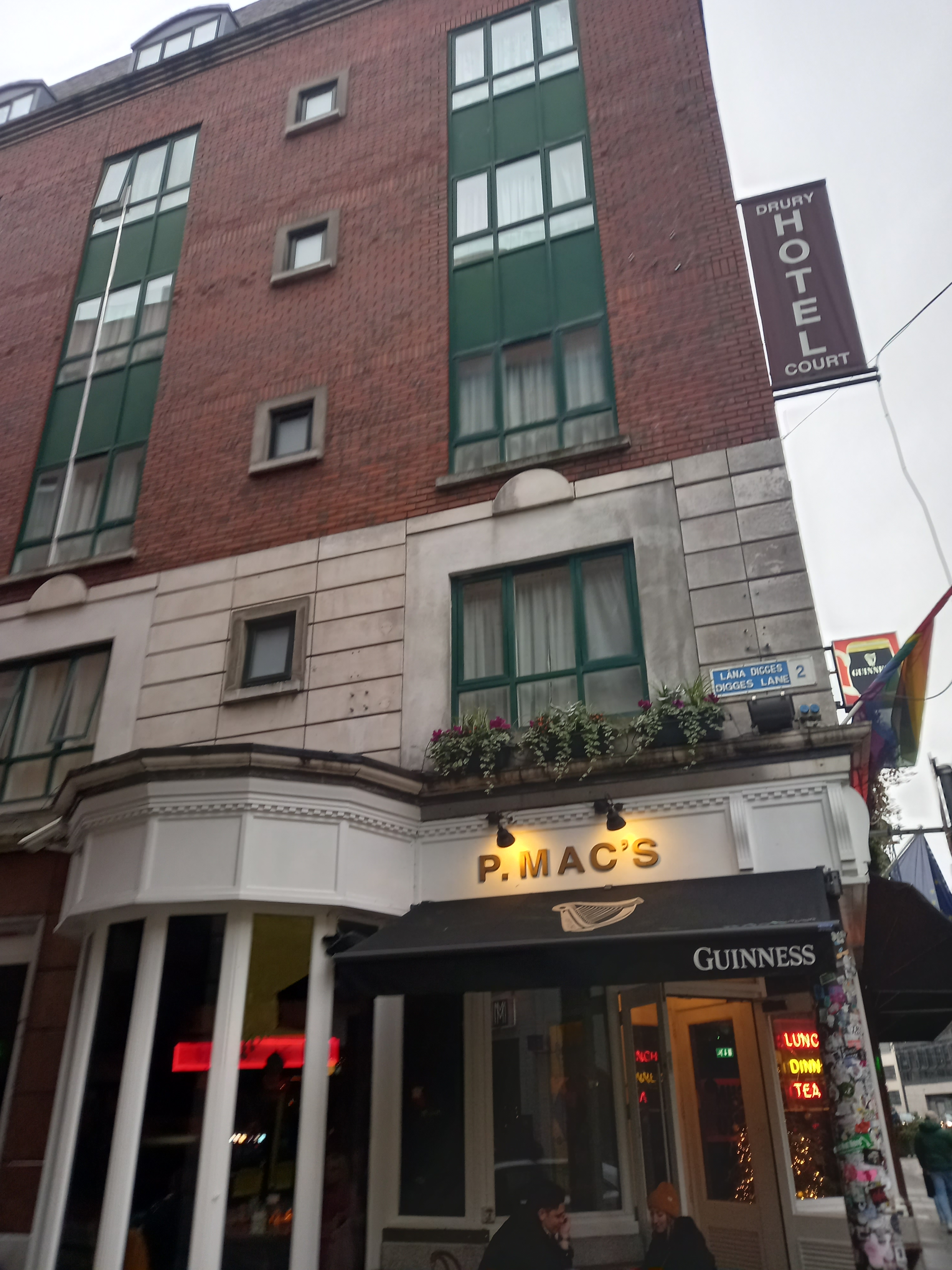
Corner with Digges Lane

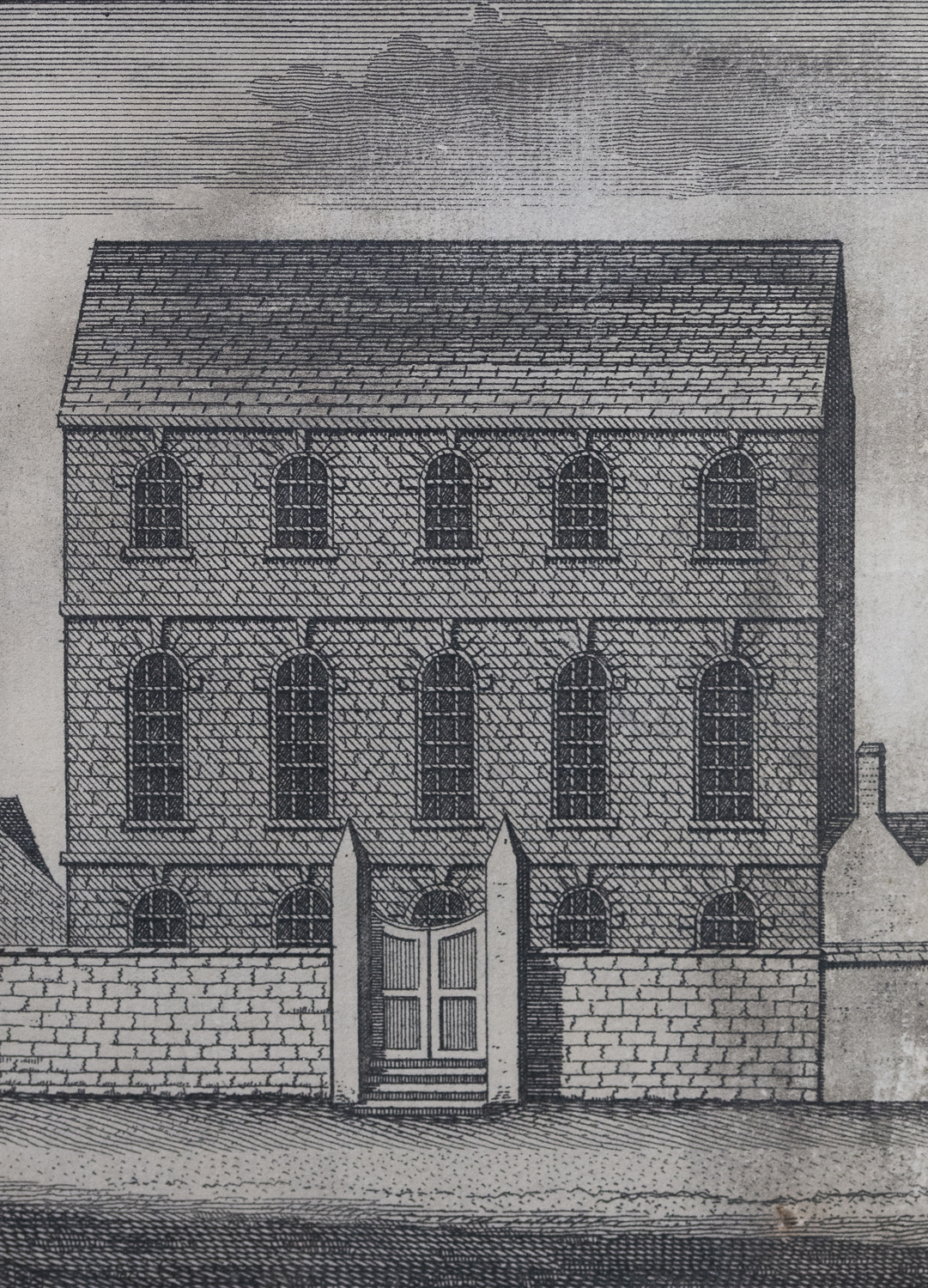
Mary Mercer's hospital taken from Charles Brooking's map of Dublin of 1728 which was built on the old church grounds of St Stephen

== See also ==
- List of streets and squares in Dublin
