= Rathbornes Candles =

Candle manufacturer based in Dublin, Ireland founded in 1488

Rathborne Candles
- Industry: Candle Manufacturing
- Founded: 1488; 538 years ago in Dublin, Ireland
- Founder: Joseph Rathborne
- Headquarters: Blanchardstown, Dublin, Ireland
- Website: Official Website

Rathborne Candles is a candle manufacturer notable for being one of the oldest candle manufacturers in the world. It was founded in 1488 in Dublin, Ireland.

== History ==
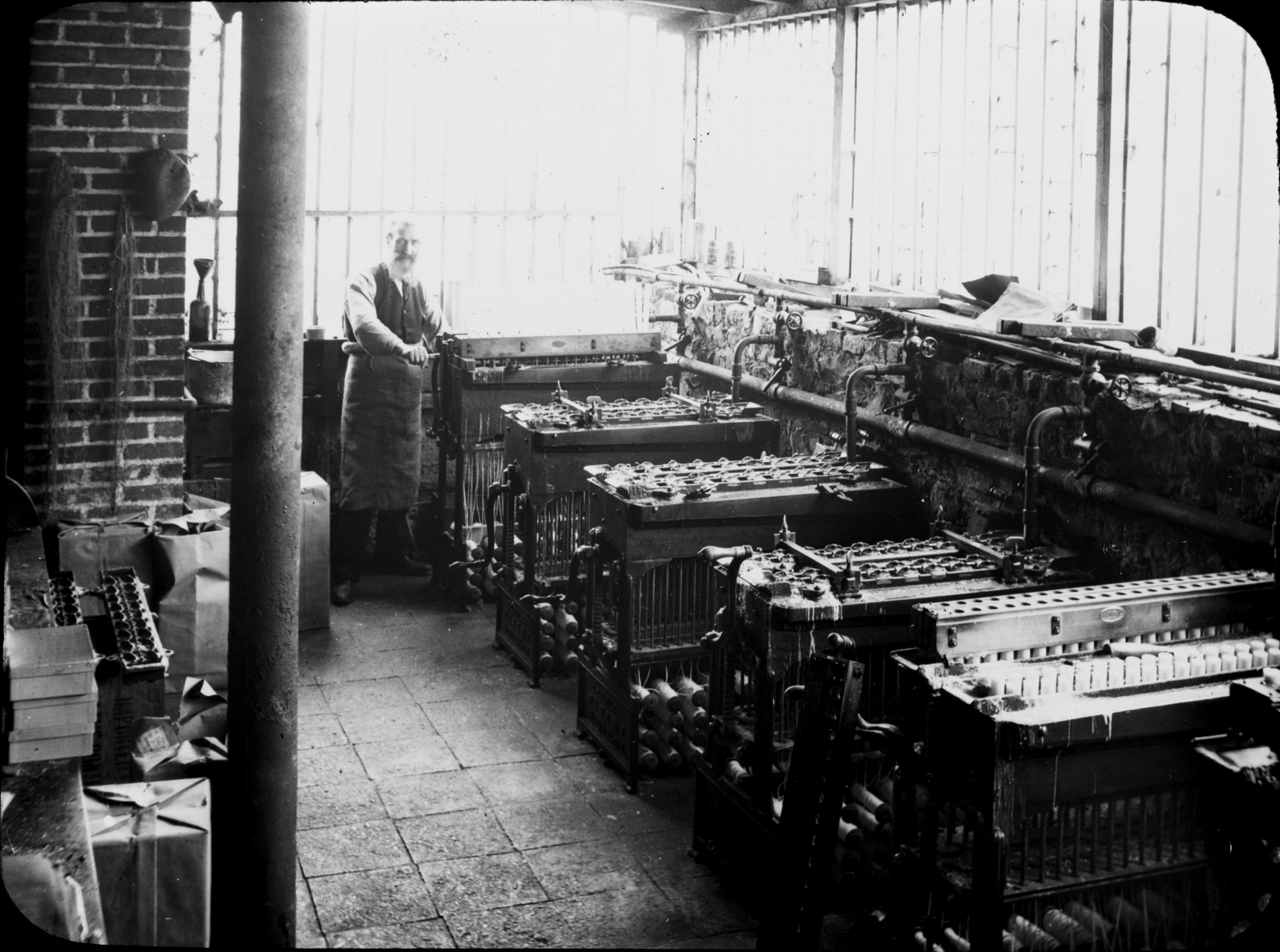
Rathbourne's candlemaker at work, circa 1910.

Joseph Rathborne came from Chester to Dublin and later established a candle manufacturing business in Dublin's Winetavern Street and sites surrounding Christ Church Cathedral. For nearly 150 years Rathbornes produced their candles in this district before locating on the north side of the city near St. Mary's Abbey.

In 1616 the Candlelight Law decreed that every fifth home should display a light for passers-by. Later in the seventeenth century, Rathbornes Candles was contracted to supply street lighting in Dublin. In addition, the company secured lucrative contracts supplying the lighthouses around the Irish coast. In 1650 the business was located in Cabragh Lane (later renamed Prussia Street).

In 1711 Joseph Rathborne signed a lease on a parcel of ground fronting Great Britain Street (modern day Parnell Street) for a term of 90 years from 'John Brock of Dublin, Joyner'. The plot measured 20ft wide x 70ft long and warranted an annual rent of £3. 7s. 6d.

In 1744 William Rathborne decided to start a business outside the city. He leased a part of the lands of the townland of Dunsink from the Rt. Hon. William Conolly and erected a small workshop. In 1763 he renewed the lease of Dunsink and around this time he built a house on part of the land in Scribblestown. Since then, the Rathborne family has a long association with various areas in Dublin 15 including Dunsinea, Ashtown and Scribblestown, although other historical locations for the business in Dublin are documented. Near to Scribblestown there is now a housing development named "Rathborne".

William Rathborne died in 1779 and the business passed on to his son William. He in turn passed on the firm to his son Henry, who built a fine house in 1811, called Dunsinea House. The house is now part of the headquarters of Teagasc.

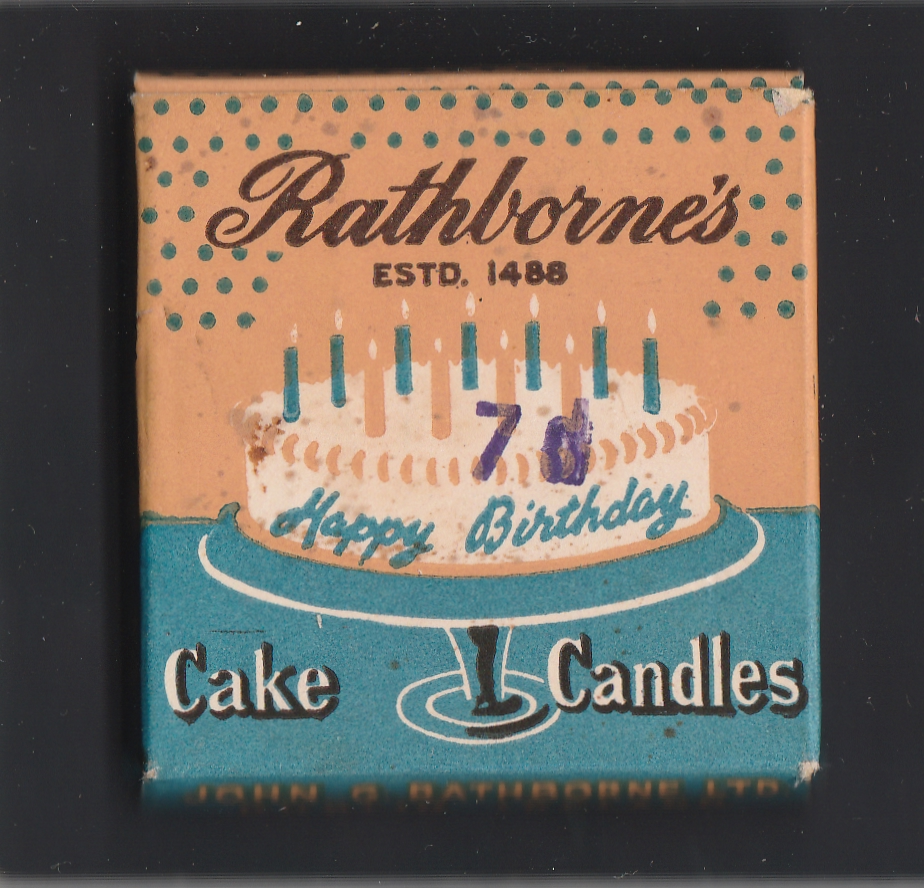
Box of 24 cake candles, as sold by Rathborne's in the 1950s

In 2002, the company moved from the East Wall Road, Dublin, its premises since 1925, to its current location in Rosemount Business Park, Blanchardstown, Dublin 15.

== Current operations ==
The company manufactures a range of candles, varying from paraffin wax to pure beeswax. They have a scented candle range, but still primarily produce church candles. The Christmas candle in the west of Ireland is a popular item, which is traditionally placed in the window. The company is the sponsor of "Atmospheric Restaurant of the Year" award in Ireland.

Rathbornes candles also have a division known as Lalor Church Candles for candle supplies and other ecclesiastical products. Rathbornes acquired Lalor Ltd. in 1966.
