= Our Lady's Park, Drumcondra =

Public park in Dublin, Ireland

Our Lady's Park
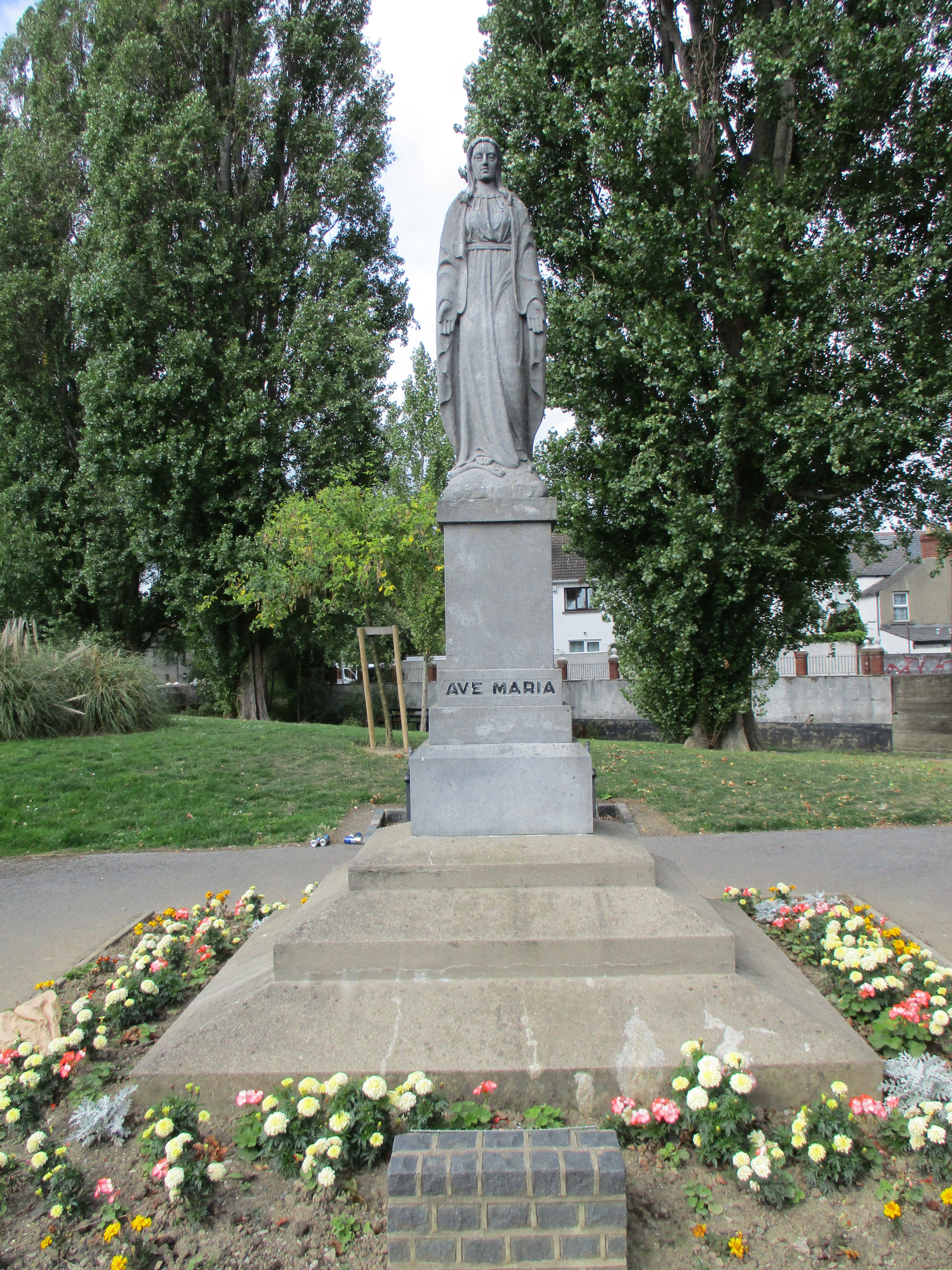
- The statue of Our Lady (Virgin Mary) in the park

- Location within Dublin Location within Ireland
- Location: Drumcondra, Dublin
- Coordinates: 53.3678°N 6.2563°W
- Area: 0.37 hectares (0.91 acres)
- Created: post-1954
- Operator: Dublin City Council
- Open: All year

Our Lady's Park (Irish: Páirc Mhuire) is a small 0.37-hectare (0.91-acre) boomerang-shaped park located on the banks of the River Tolka in Dublin city next to Frank Flood Bridge in Drumcondra (previously known as 'Drumcondra Bridge' prior to 2018). The park is notable for its statue of the Virgin Mary, presumably erected in 1954 for the Marian Year which had been declared by Pope John XXIII.

== History ==
The triangular portion of the park opposite Fagan's public house was once a collection of single-storeyed dwellings known as Tolka Cottages (or Botanic Cottages) which were constructed pre-1890 to house mill workers employed at a local flour mill (now the site of the Millmount House pub). Due to the proximity of the houses to the River Tolka, they were prone to flooding, and suffered much damage during a particularly bad event in December 1954 when the river broke its banks and flooded parts of Glasnevin, Drumcondra, Fairview, Ballybough, North Strand and East Wall. The houses were cleared from the area as a safety liability after this event. A factory owned by Irish confectioners Lemon’s Pure Sweets existed close to the site of the present-day park for many years, and the park became colloquially known as Lemon's Park. Lemon's ceased trading in 1983. In the summer of 2012, Dublin City Council erected a sign officially naming the park as 'Our Lady's Park'.

== Statue ==
There has been a statue of the Virgin Mary present within the grounds of the present-park since at least the early twentieth century, as James Joyce, in his 1916 novel A Portrait of the Artist as a Young Man, recounts how the character of Stephen Dedalus turned his gaze "towards the faded blue shrine of the Blessed Virgin" before crossing the bridge over the River Tolka. It is possible that the statue had been erected by the inhabitants of Tolka Cottages as a protection against flooding. The present statue, a freestanding 'cast-stone' depiction of Mary (credited to 'Leo Broe & Sons, 94 Harold's Cross Rd'), was presumably erected in 1954 for the Marian Year, an event which mobilised many working-class communities across Dublin to erect statues of Our Lady. As a result, the statue has been dated by the National Inventory of Architectural Heritage to between 1950 and 1955. In the 1960s, amateur Dublin film-maker Leslie Crowe captured footage of the annual procession held around the park to commemorate the statue's vigil.

== Amenities ==
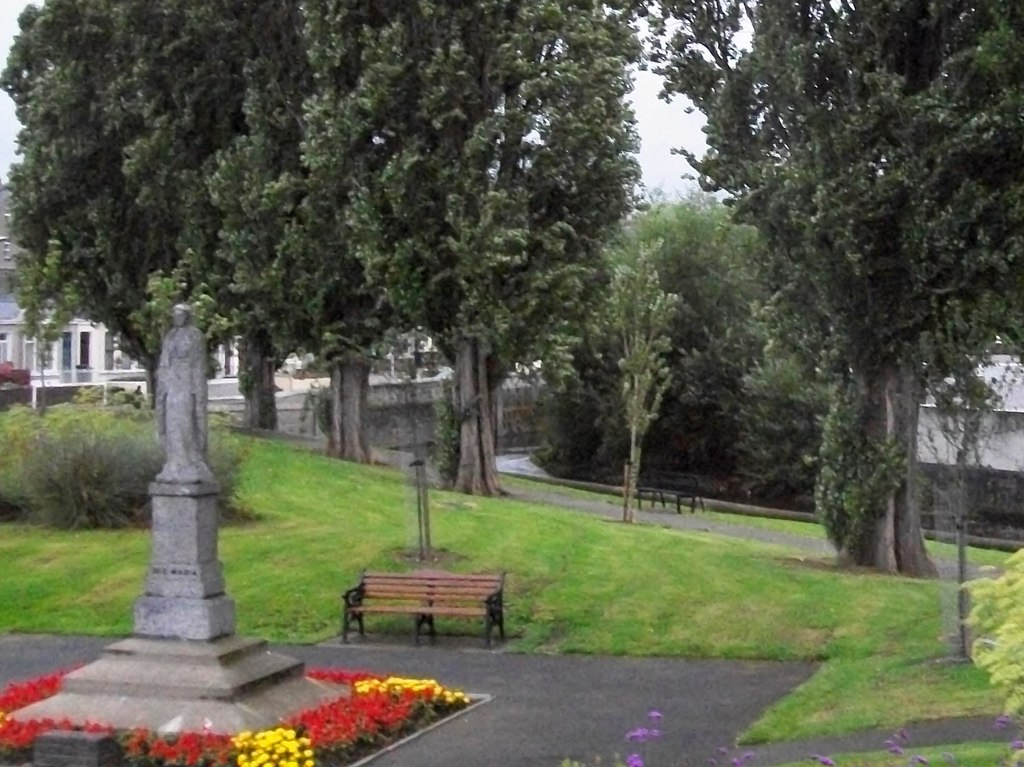
Looking west along the River Tolka

The park is maintained by Dublin City Council who change the flower beds seasonally, and the flags sporadically. The park is located adjacent to the N1, the main Dublin to Belfast road, which witnesses heavy vehicular traffic on a daily basis. The park is also within walking distance of Croke Park, a major Gaelic games stadium, which attracts thousands of visitors during the sporting season. As of October 2022, there are six benches in the park.

'Drumcondra Storm Water Pumping Station' is a rectangular red-brick building located within the grounds of the park close to Botanic Avenue. It was completed in June 2009 to protect the N1 road and Botanic Avenue from surface-water flooding events and consists of three pumps with a maximum pumping rate of 800 litres per second via a flapped outlet / rising main into the river. Almost immediately after its installation, it served to pump 3,000 m³ of water off adjacent roads during a pluvial rainfall event that occurred between 3 and 4am in the early hours of 2 July 2009.
