= Sheriff Street =

Street and sometimes area of Dublin inner city

- Sheriffer
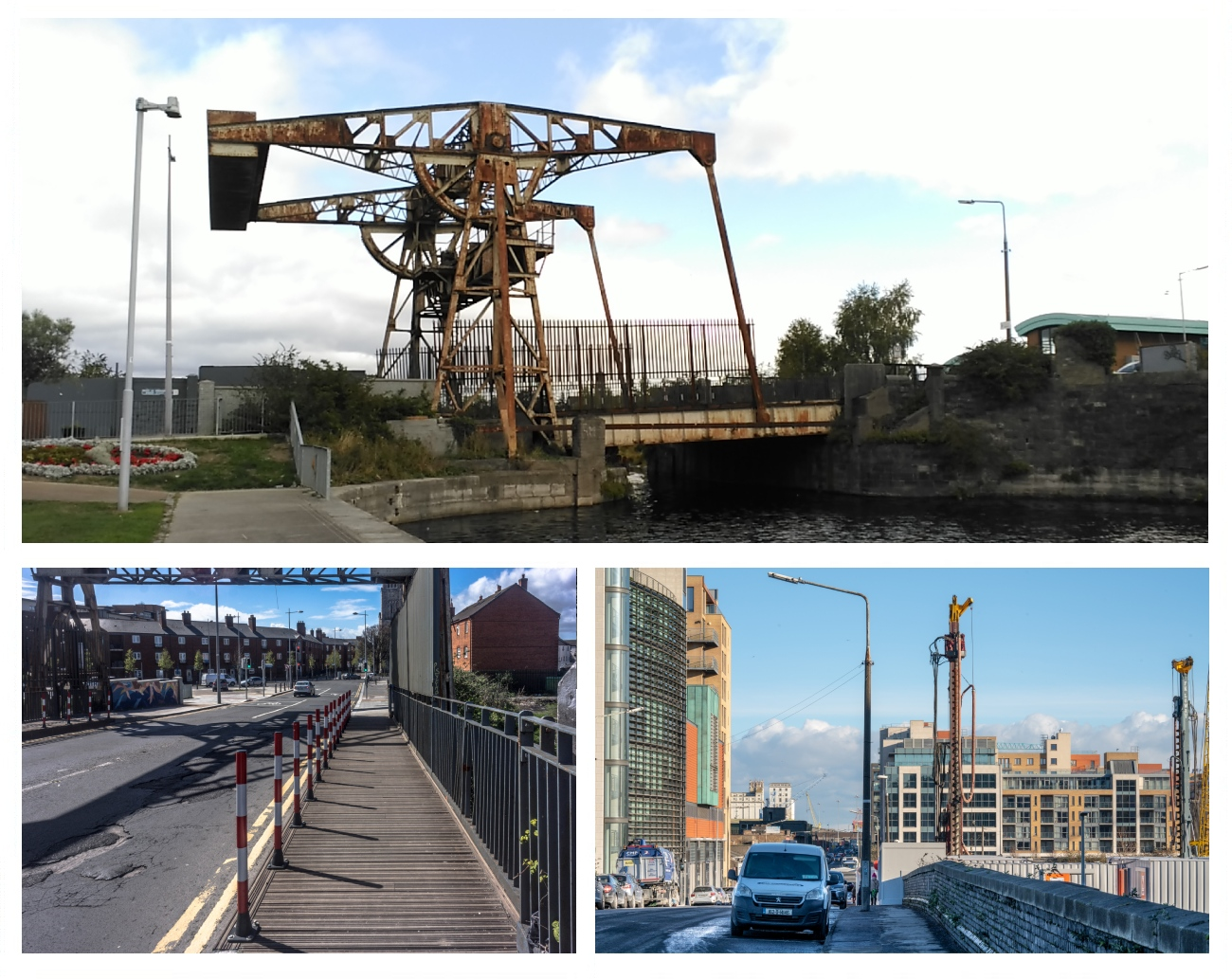
- Sheriff Street, Dublin

- Location within Dublin
- Native name: Sráid an tSirriam (Irish)
- Namesake: Sheriff of Dublin City
- Length: 1.2 km (0.75 mi)
- Width: 12 metres (39 ft)
- Location: Dublin, Ireland
- Postal code: D01
- Coordinates: 53°21′02″N 6°14′26″W
- west end: Commons Street
- east end: East Wall Road

Sheriff Street (Irish: Sráid an tSirriam) is a street in the north inner city of Dublin, Ireland, lying between East Wall and North Wall and often considered to be part of the North Wall area. It is divided into Sheriff Street Lower (west end) and Sheriff Street Upper (east end).

== History ==
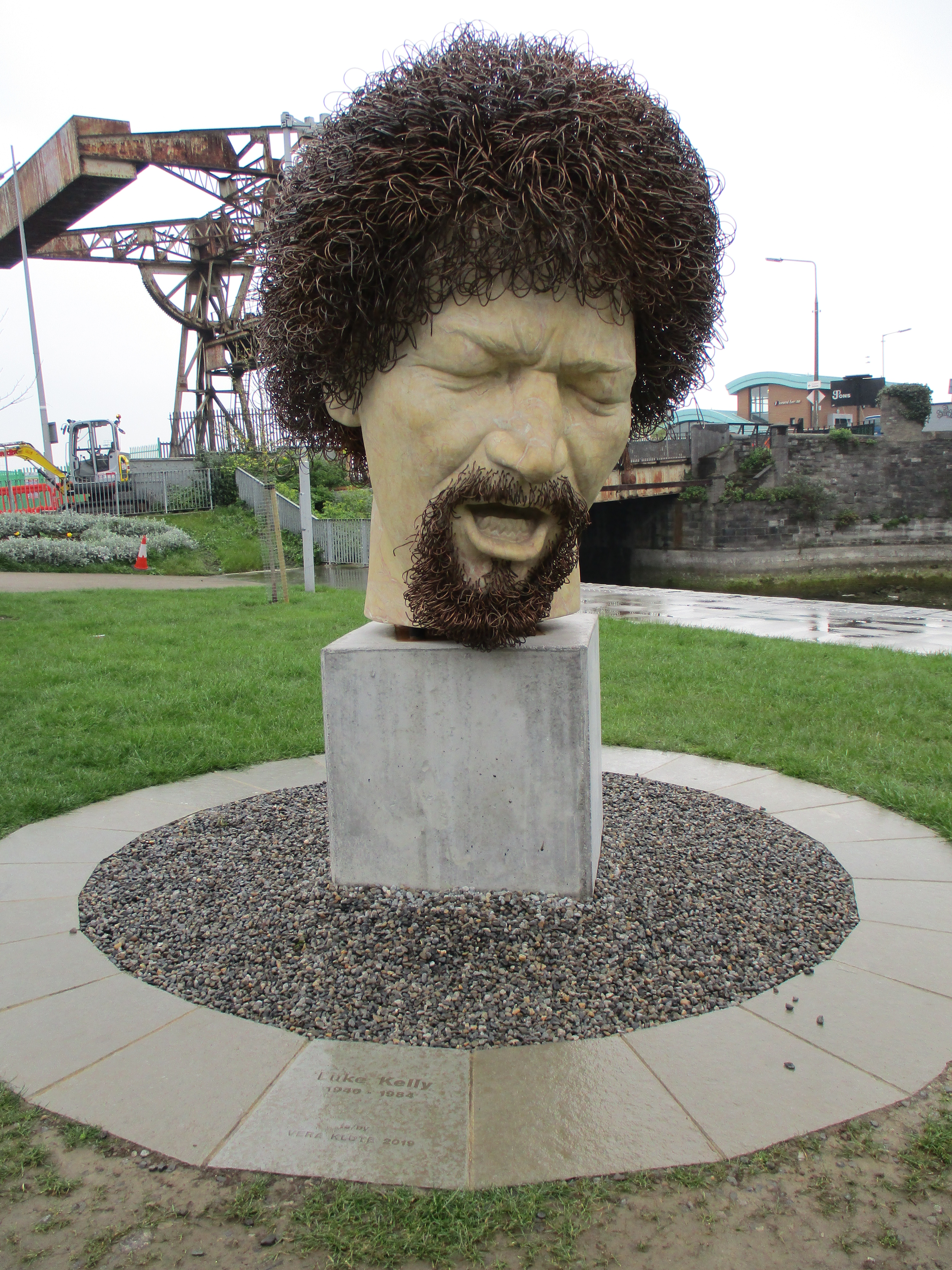
Sculpture of the singer Luke Kelly on Sheriff Street. Sculpture was erected in 2019

=== Naming convention ===
The street is one of a number of streets within the North Wall area named after positions and groupings relating to Dublin Corporation and the City Assembly (an archaic name for Dublin Corporation and Dublin City Council) which first laid out the area in the 18th century on reclaimed ground including: Mayor Street, Guild Street, Commons Street (referring to the Common Council, the "commons" or lower house of the City Assembly of Dublin) and Alderman Way. Sheriff itself refers to the Sheriff of Dublin City, a position that existed from 1548 when it replaced the term "bailiff".

=== Location and boundaries ===
The Sheriff Street area might be defined as Upper and Lower Sheriff Street, Mayor Street, Guild Street, Commons Street, Oriel Street, Seville Place, Crinan Strand and Mariner's Port. One of the most visible buildings is St. Laurence O'Toole's Roman Catholic church, which was built in the 1840s and officially opened in 1853, and is accessible via Seville Place. Traditionally, work on Dublin's docks provided employment for local men, but the arrival of containerization led to mass unemployment in the late 1980s.

=== 21st century ===
Sheriff Street has a reputation as a run-down area with a high crime rate. the area was for many years notable for the Sheriff Street flats which consisted of St Laurence's Mansions, St Bridget's Gardens and Phil Shanahan House. Issues with poverty and crime peaked during the heroin epidemic of the 1980s and 1990s. In the late 1990s, the flats were demolished and the area underwent gentrification. Many residents of the flats were housed nearby whilst others left the area. Many of the now gentrified buildings, constructed on the former site of the flats, are accessible on Mayor Street. Lower Sheriff Street remains a working-class area consisting of houses. Noctors's Pub is a longstanding business in the area.

=== In the media ===
In 1973, RTÉ Radio 1 producer, Seán Mac Réamoinn set out to capture life in the North Wall and Sheriff Street area of the city in a radio documentary, Inner City Island, looking to the past, present and future, which aired on RTÉ Radio 1 on 17 March 2009. Parts of the film In The Name Of The Father were shot in Sheriff Street in the early 1990s, as well as the film The Commitments.

== Notable people ==
- Gemma Dunleavy Spent her early years in Phil Shanahan Flats, now demolished and currently lives in Oriel Street. Her EP, 'Up De Flats" documents the experience of living in the area.
- Stephen Gately, Boyzone
- Luke Kelly of the band The Dubliners was born in Lattimore Cottages, 1 Sheriff Street. His place of birth has since been demolished.
- Jim Sheridan
- Denise Mitchell TD was born in Sheriff Street and lived there until her family moved into the new social housing projects in Darndale.

== See also ==
- List of towns and villages in the Republic of Ireland
