= Tolka Valley Park =

Park in Dublin, Ireland

- Páirc Ghleann na Tulchann
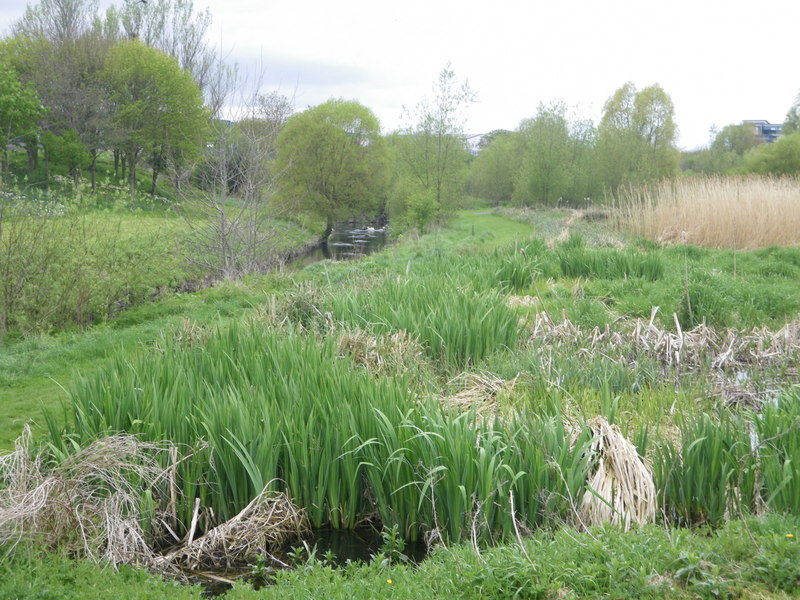
- Wetlands at the confluence of Finglaswood Stream and River Tolka in Tolka Valley Park
- Location: Dublin, Ireland
- OSI/OSNI grid: O131376
- Coordinates: 53.377°N 6.301°W
- Administered by: Dublin City Council, Fingal County Council
- Habitats: Woodland, wetland, grassland

Tolka Valley Park (Irish: Páirc Ghleann na Tulchann) is a public park on the River Tolka, spanning the suburbs of Ashtown, Finglas and Glasnevin, in Dublin, Ireland.

Covering approximately 50 hectares (120 acres), sections of the park are laid-out over a former city landfill, while the eastern part of the park is located on the estate lands of the former Finglaswood House. Some of park's wooded areas were planted in 2011, while the wetland sections of the park were developed in 1999. These "integrated constructed wetlands" were built at the confluence between the Finglaswood Stream and River Tolka, and designed to improve water quality and reduce pollution in the watercourse. Sections of the River Tolka, within the park, have been stocked with salmon and trout.

There are sports pitches, a par-3 municipal golf course, and a pitch and putt course on the site. As of 2018, it was reported that some of the park's sports pitches had been damaged by "scrambler bikes", with issues of anti-social behaviour sometimes reported in the area.

The eastern section of Tolka Valley Park, within the Dublin City Council authority area, spans westward from the Finglas Road in Glasnevin via Finglas to Ashtown. A further section, sometimes referred to as "Tolka Valley Linear Park" or "Tolka Valley Regional Park", extends into the Fingal County Council authority area, westwards from Blanchardstown to Mulhuddart.

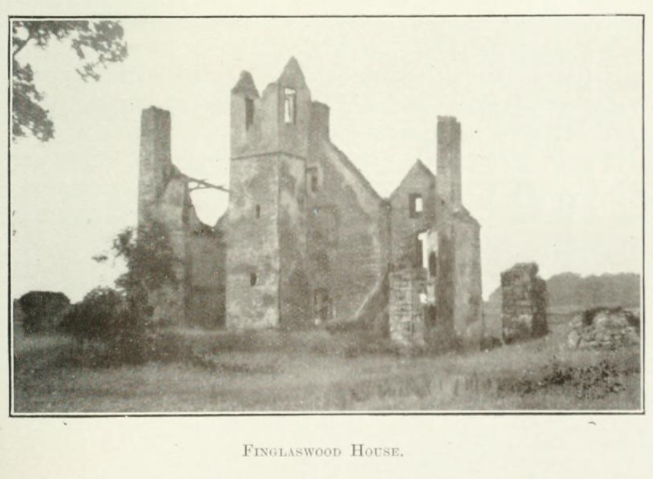
Illustration of the ruins of Finglaswood House c.1912
