= Annesley Bridge =

Bridge in Dublin, Ireland

Annesley Bridge Droichead Annesley
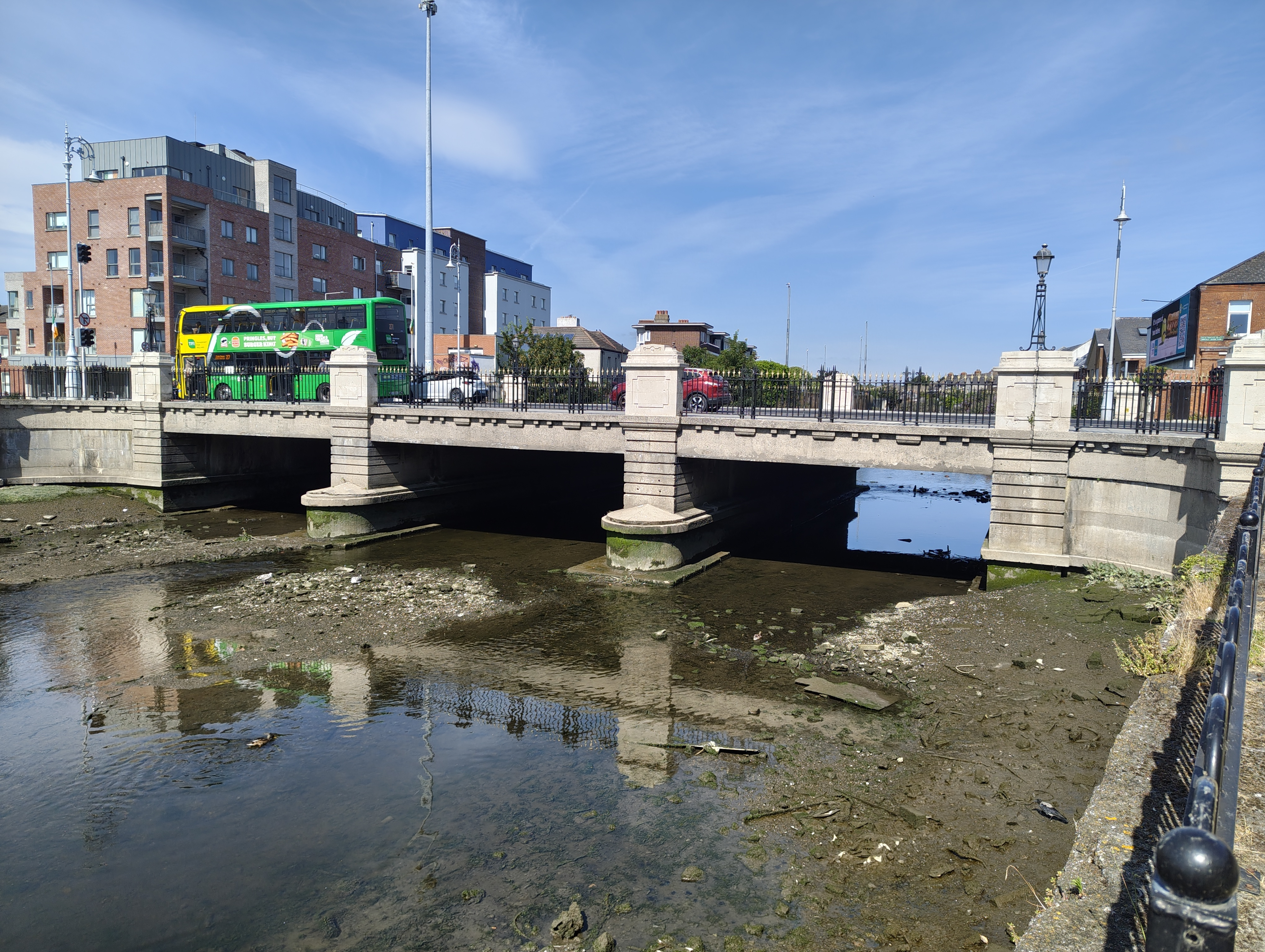
- View of the Annesley Bridge looking west from Fairview Park
- Coordinates: 53.3609°N 6.24090°W
- Crosses: River Tolka
- Locale: Dublin
- Named for: Richard Annesley, 6th Earl of Anglesey

History
- Opened: 1797
- Rebuilt: 1926; 100 years ago

Location
- Interactive map of Annesley Bridge

Annesley Bridge (Irish: Droichead Annesley) crosses the River Tolka in Fairview, Dublin, Ireland. It is named after Richard Annesley, 6th Earl of Anglesey. The East Wall Road, North Strand Road and Poplar Row meet at the west end of the bridge with Annesley Bridge Road at the east end, making it an important junction in the north inner city.

== History ==
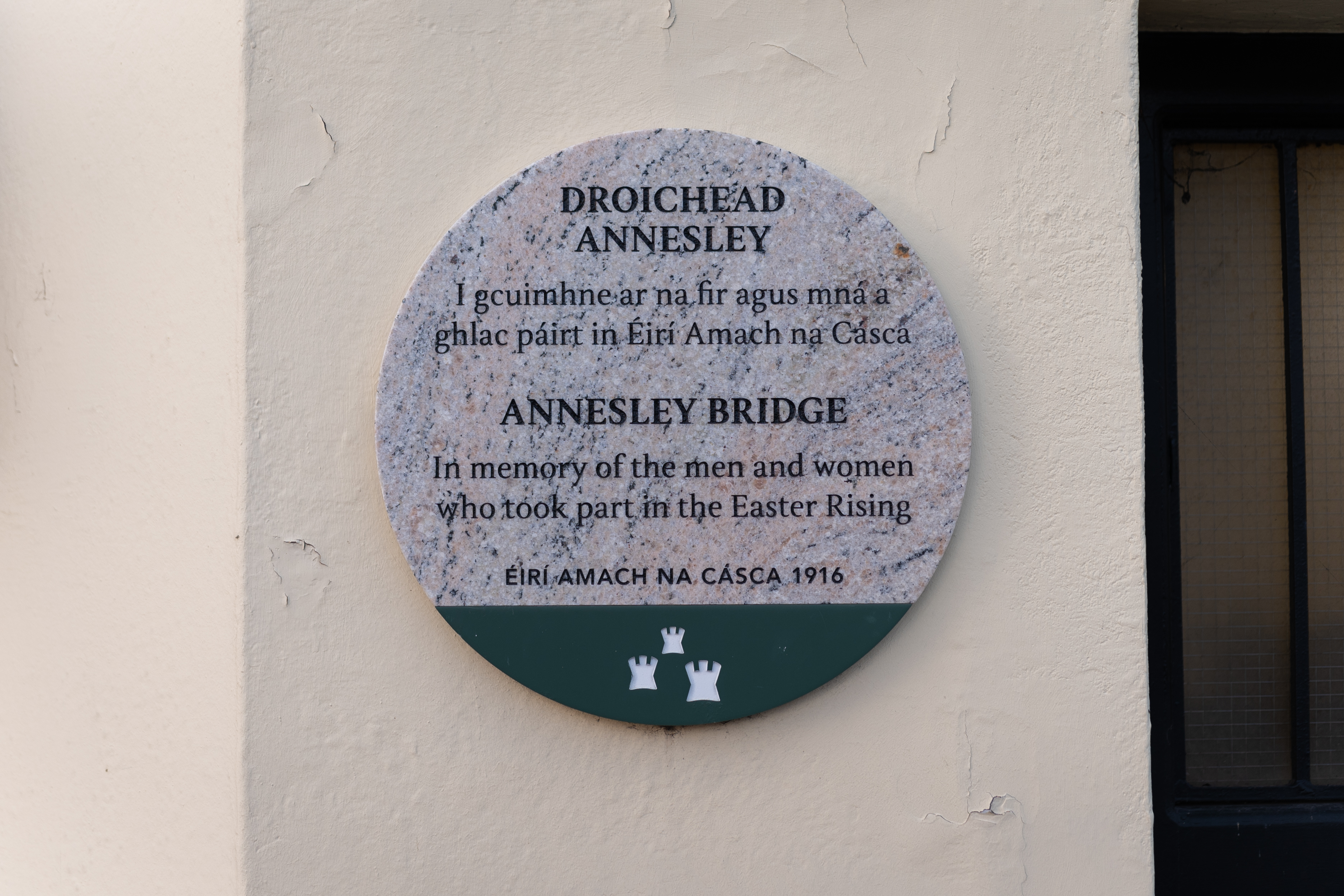
Dublin City Council 1916 Commemorative Plaque to the Battle of Annesley Bridge

Building of the original bridge commenced in 1792 by aristocrat Richard Annesley, and opened to the public in 1797. A decorative silver trowel given to him during the opening ceremony was later auctioned and displayed in the Dublin Civic Museum. Around 1880, the bridge was the end of the line for horse trams, which were later replaced with trams that ran up Annesley Bridge Road towards Clontarf and beyond.

During the Rising of 1916, the bridge became the location and namesake of the Battle of Annesley Bridge. A plaque was erected in 2016 by Dublin City Council nearby at Annesley Place to commemorate the battle.

Ten years later in 1926, the original bridge was demolished, rebuilt and widened as the structure that stands today. The bridge now incorporates cycle lanes on both sides as part of the Clontarf to City Centre Project (C2CC).
