= Drury Street =

Street in central Dublin, Ireland

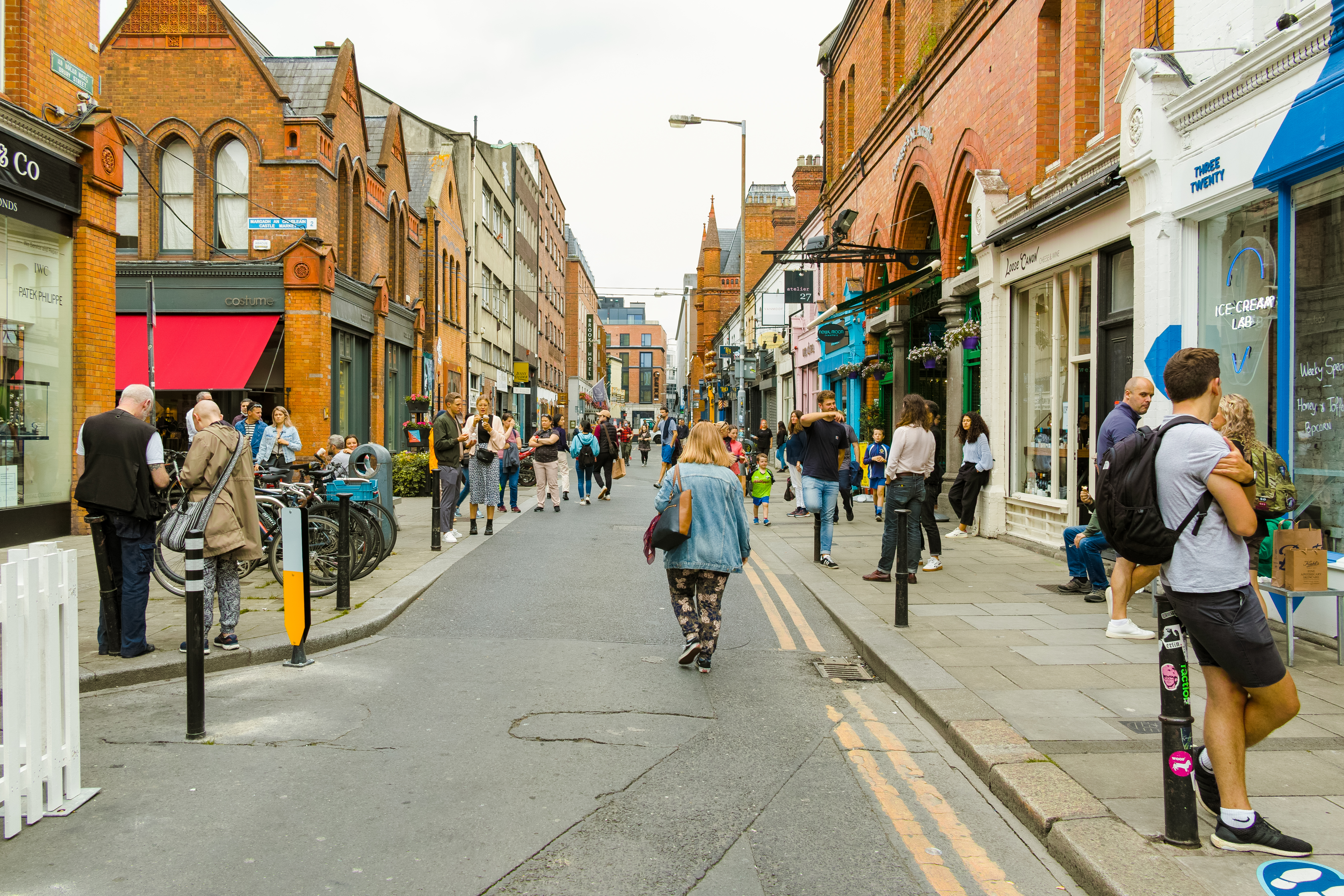
- Drury Street in July 2020

- Location within Central Dublin
- Native name: Irish: An Bóthar Beag or Sráid Drury
- Namesake: William Drury or Drury Lane
- Location: Dublin, Ireland
- Coordinates: 53°20′32.44″N 6°15′47.77″W
- North: Exchequer Street
- South: Stephen Street

Other
- Known for: retail rag trade Victorian architecture bars and restaurants George's Street Arcade

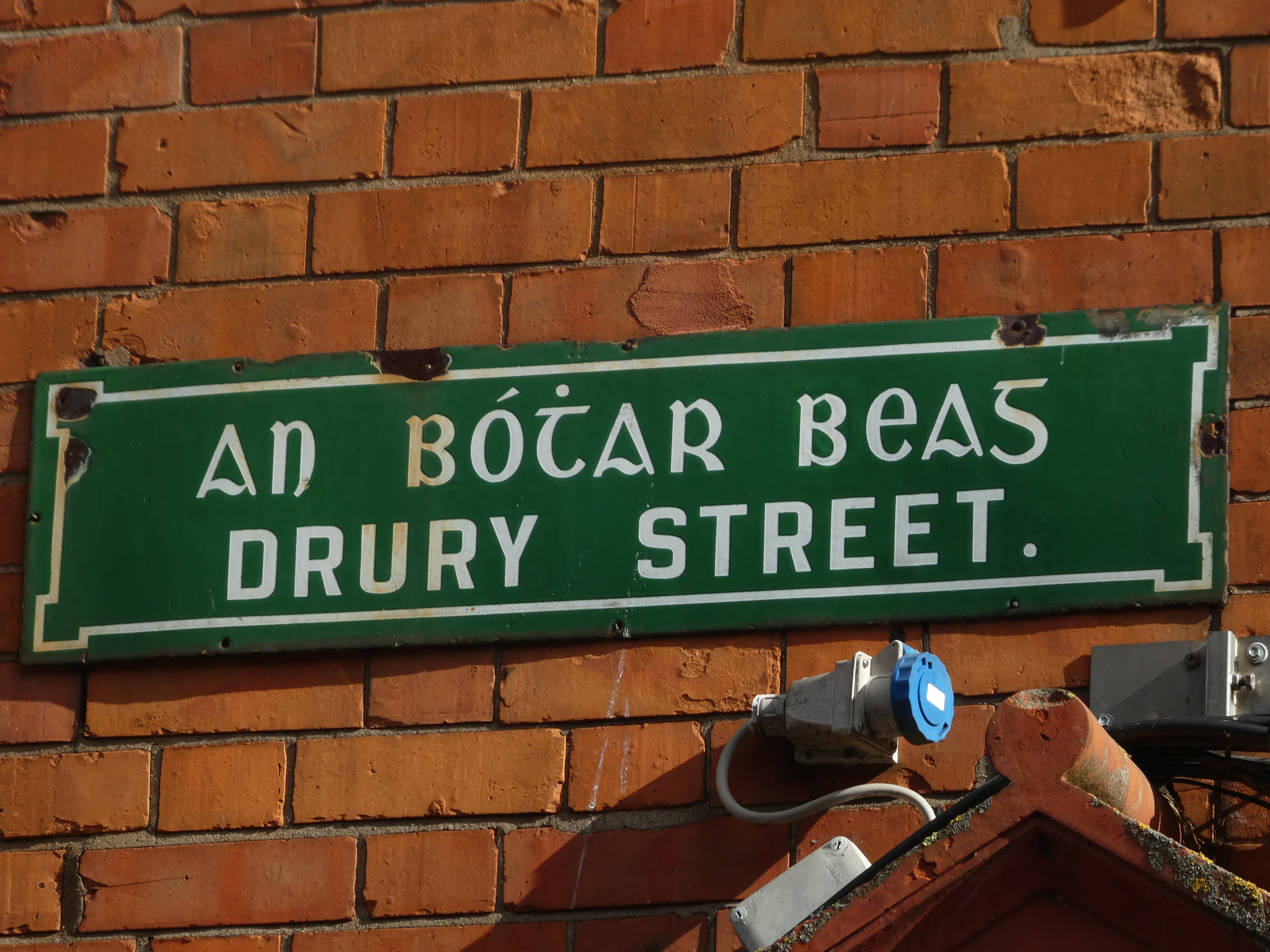
Old street sign with the Irish name An Bóthar Beag in Gaelic type above.

Drury Street (Irish: An Bóthar Beag, meaning 'the small road') is a narrow and partially pedestrianised retail street in the centre of Dublin, Ireland. Old names for the street include Drury Lane and Little Boater Lane.

The street is connected to Exchequer Street at its northern end and Stephen Street at its southern end. It is intersected by Fade Street and Castle Market and runs parallel to South William Street.

== History ==
=== Early history ===
Drury Street, situated in Dublin's south inner city, traces its origins to the early 17th century and was originally outside of the city walls close to the medieval church and hospital of Saint Stephen. The street is referred to as "Little Boater Lane" on maps from 1673 and 1756. "Boater" may be derived from the Irish word "Bóthar", meaning "road" or alternatively may be sourced from butter or booter which it is referred to on early maps. Drury Street was later referred to as "Drury Lane" before being mainly referred to as Drury Street from the middle of the 18th century onwards.

The name "Drury" may reference Sir William Drury, an English statesman and soldier who served as Lord Justice of Ireland in the late 16th century. Alternatively, the name may be a reference to Drury Lane in London or have been influenced by London naming conventions.

=== 19th century: Victorian transformation ===
The street underwent significant changes during the Victorian era, transitioning from a narrow lane to a more structured thoroughfare. In the early 1800s, the area was primarily a hub for the meat trade, with Drury Street and its neighbouring lanes lined with butcher shops and abattoirs. By the late 19th century, many of these businesses had closed or become derelict, leading to the purchase and demolition of numerous buildings to clear space for the construction of George's Street Arcade.

The development of George's Street Arcade in 1878, resulted in Victorian commercial buildings characterized by red brick and terracotta details dominating the street.

=== 19th and 20th centuries: Industrial hub ===
In the late 19th century, Drury Street became a hub for industry. Notably, in 1889, Powers Distillery established its bottling hall and warehouse between Fade Street and Drury Street. This site is credited with the creation of the world's first miniature spirit bottle, known as "Baby Powers", catering to the needs of grooms and coachmen who required portable whiskey flasks. Other Whiskey Distillers using the street included Roe's and Jameson.

By the early 20th century, Drury Street had become a key node in Dublin’s garment industry, colloquially known as the "rag trade". The street’s architecture reflected this shift, with many buildings housing tailoring workshops and clothing warehouses. One notable example is the Drury Buildings; now a well-known restaurant and venue, the premises originally operated as a clothing factory from the 1940s onwards.

=== 21st century ===
In response to the COVID-19 pandemic and the need for outdoor dining spaces, Dublin City Council initiated pedestrianisation trials in 2020, including Drury Street. These trials received overwhelming public support, with 95% of respondents in favour of permanent pedestrianisation. Consequently, from May 2021, sections of Drury Street were designated as traffic-free zones after 11 am daily, enhancing the street's pedestrian-friendly atmosphere. However, no infrastructural changes were made to accommodate the change in use.

In 2025, debates arose over the function of the street. The 2021 pedestrianisation of the street led to a surge in the popularity of the street as a meeting place for young people to meet, socialise and drink, particularally in times of good weather. However, some shop owners were unhappy with the crowds, suggesting they were deterring shoppers. The debate was seen by some as a reflection of wider debates about urban design in Dublin.

== See also ==
- List of streets and squares in Dublin
