= St. Joseph's Church, East Wall =

St. Joseph's Church
- The Church of St. Joseph, East Wall
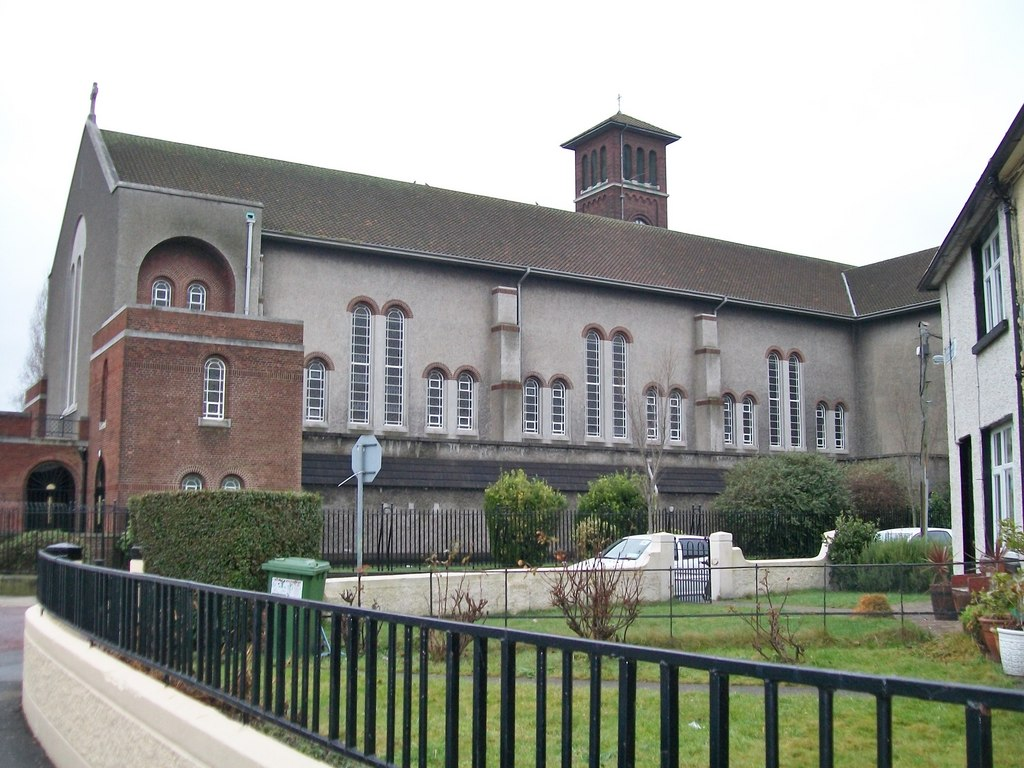
- Side view of St. Joseph's Church, December 2010

- Location within Dublin
- 53.3543°N 6.23661°W
- Location: East Wall, Dublin
- Country: Ireland
- Denomination: Roman Catholic
- Website: www.stjosephschurcheastwall.ie

Architecture
- Functional status: Active
- Architectural type: Lombardic
- Groundbreaking: 8 November 1954
- Completed: 29 July 1956

Specifications
- Length: 58.5 metres (192 ft)
- Width: 48.3 metres (158 ft)

Administration
- Parish: St. Joseph's Parish

St. Joseph's Church is a Catholic church situated on Church Road in the East Wall area of Dublin, Ireland.

== History ==
Originally this area was part of St Laurence O'Toole Church, North Wall, in the Archdiocese of Dublin. From 1919 there was a church known as the 'Tin Church' on Church Road, at a site opposite Seaview Avenue. In 1941 this became the parish church of the newly constituted parish of East Wall. This building is now a gym.

In 1954 it was decided to build a new, bigger church, the present St Joseph's Church, at the junction of Church Road and St Mary's Road. The Foundation Stone was blessed on 8 November 1954, and on 29 July 1956 the then Archbishop John Charles McQuaid blessed and officially opened the new Church of St Joseph in East Wall.

The pastor from 1972 to 1980 was Joseph Kavanagh, SJ, who died in 1982 in a car accident.

== Changes and development ==
St Joseph's church has seen significant changes since it was built. Many of these changes are reflected in work that has been carried out on the church building over the years. The Sanctuary was reordered. This enables the priest to celebrate Mass facing the people. The reordered Sanctuary is a much bigger space and facilitates the active involvement of lay people.

The Church was named in 2013 a "key landmark" by the City of Dublin.

St Joseph's East Wall is also a "favorite" place for music performances.
