= East Wall Road =

Road in Dublin, Ireland

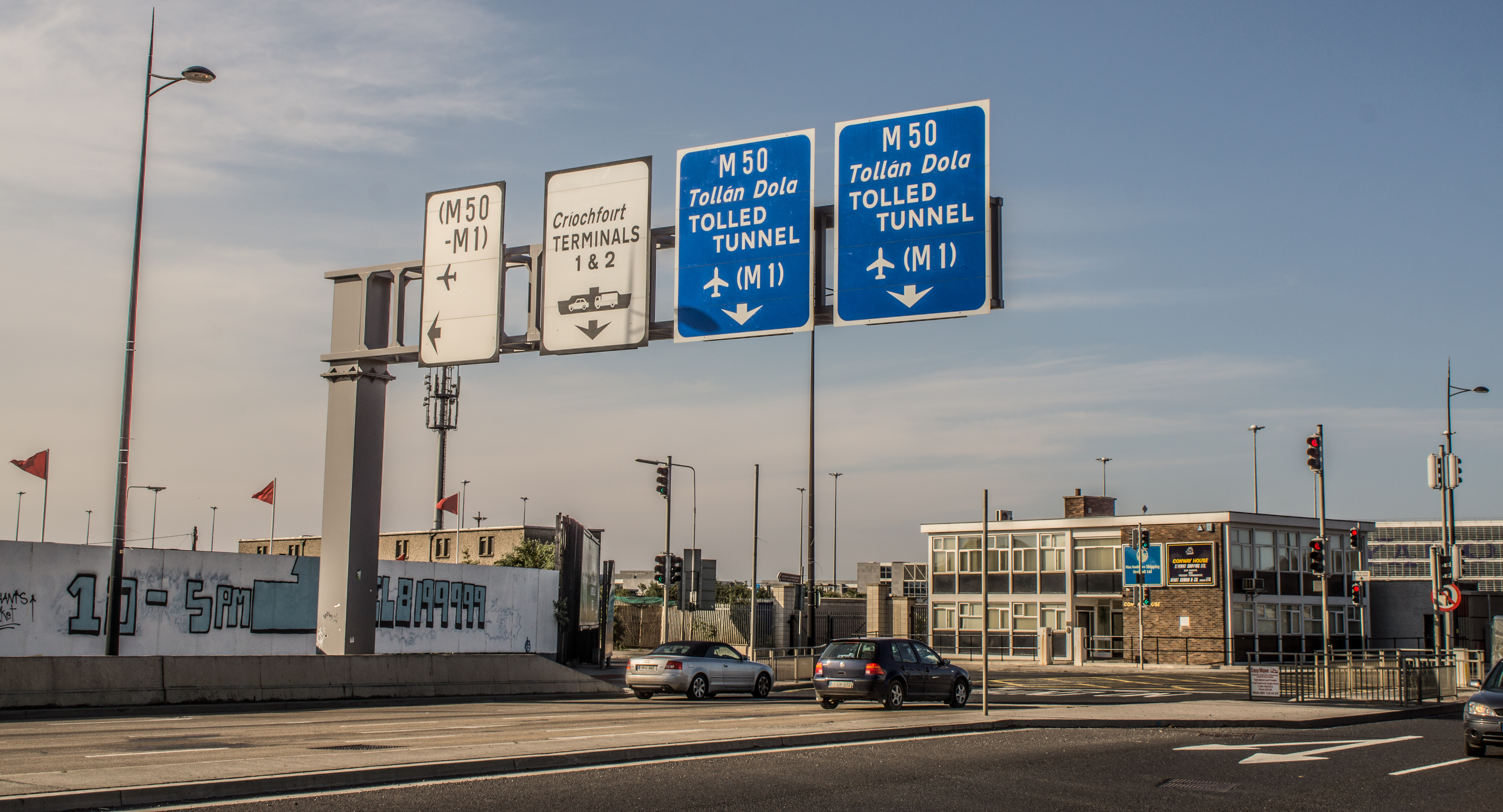

- Location within Dublin
- Native name: Bóthar an Phoirt Thoir (Irish)
- Namesake: East Wall
- Length: 2.0 km (1.2 mi)
- Width: 17 metres (56 ft)
- Location: Dublin, Ireland
- Postal code: D03
- Coordinates: 53°21′18″N 6°13′45.32″W
- north end: North Strand Road, Annesley Bridge Road, Poplar Row
- south end: J79 Roundabout (Tom Clarke Bridge and North Wall Quay)

East Wall Road (Irish: Bóthar an Phoirt Thoir) runs from the junction of the East-Link drawbridge and North Wall Quay, along the side of the northern part of Dublin port to the junction of the North Strand Road and Poplar Row.

== History ==
East Wall Road takes its name from its eastern position within Dublin city and appears on maps in 1851 and 1876. As far back as 1756 it is referred to as East Quay on John Roque's map of Dublin.

Rathbornes Candles had a manufacturing site on the road from 1925 until 2002.

== Buildings and areas ==
The Point Theatre lay at its southern end before it was demolished to make way for the O_{2} in 2008. It marks the boundary between the port and the residential area of East Wall. Much of the western side of the road north of East Road is residential.

The Docklands Innovation Park is located on East Wall Road, in which a number of businesses including 103.2 Dublin City FM are located.

== See also ==
- List of streets and squares in Dublin
