= Ballybough =

Northern inner city district of Dublin, Ireland

Ballybough An Baile Bocht (Irish)
- Inner city district
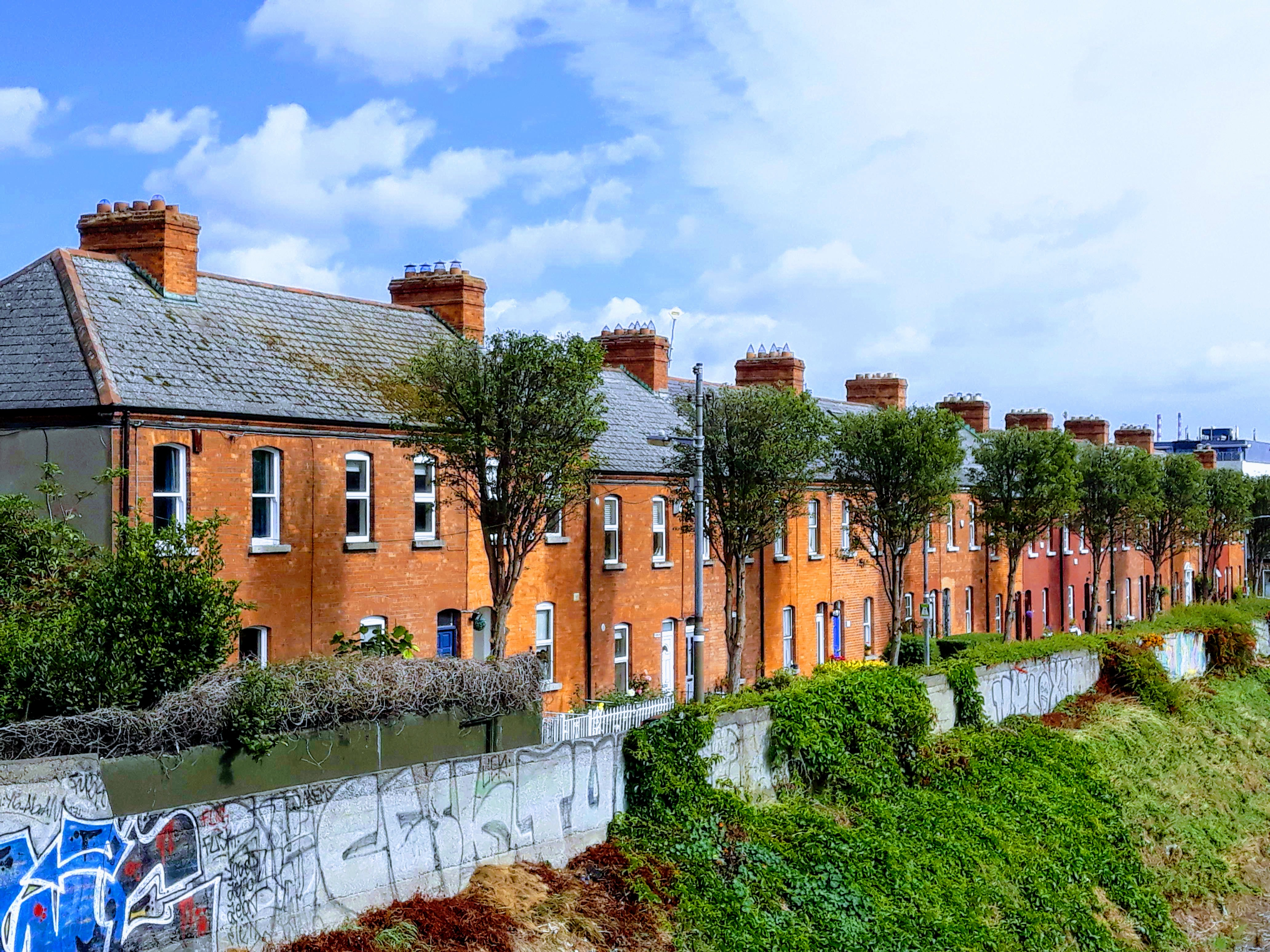
- A view overlooking the Victorian red-brick terraces of Clonmore Terrace, Ballybough

- Location in Ireland
- Coordinates: 53°21′23″N 6°15′03″W
- Country: Ireland
- Province: Leinster
- County: County Dublin
- Local authority: Dublin City Council
- Time zone: UTC+0 (WET)
  - Summer (DST): UTC-1 (IST (WEST))
- Eircode routing key: D03

Ballybough (Irish: An Baile Bocht, meaning 'the poor town') is an inner city district of northeast Dublin, Ireland. Adjacent areas include the North Strand and Clonliffe.

== Location ==
Ballybough is an inner city district of northeast Dublin. Neighbouring districts include Drumcondra to the north, Fairview to the east, North Strand to the southeast and Phibsborough to the west. Croke Park, the headquarters of the Gaelic Athletic Association, is a prominent local landmark in the area where Ballybough meets Drumcondra.

== History ==
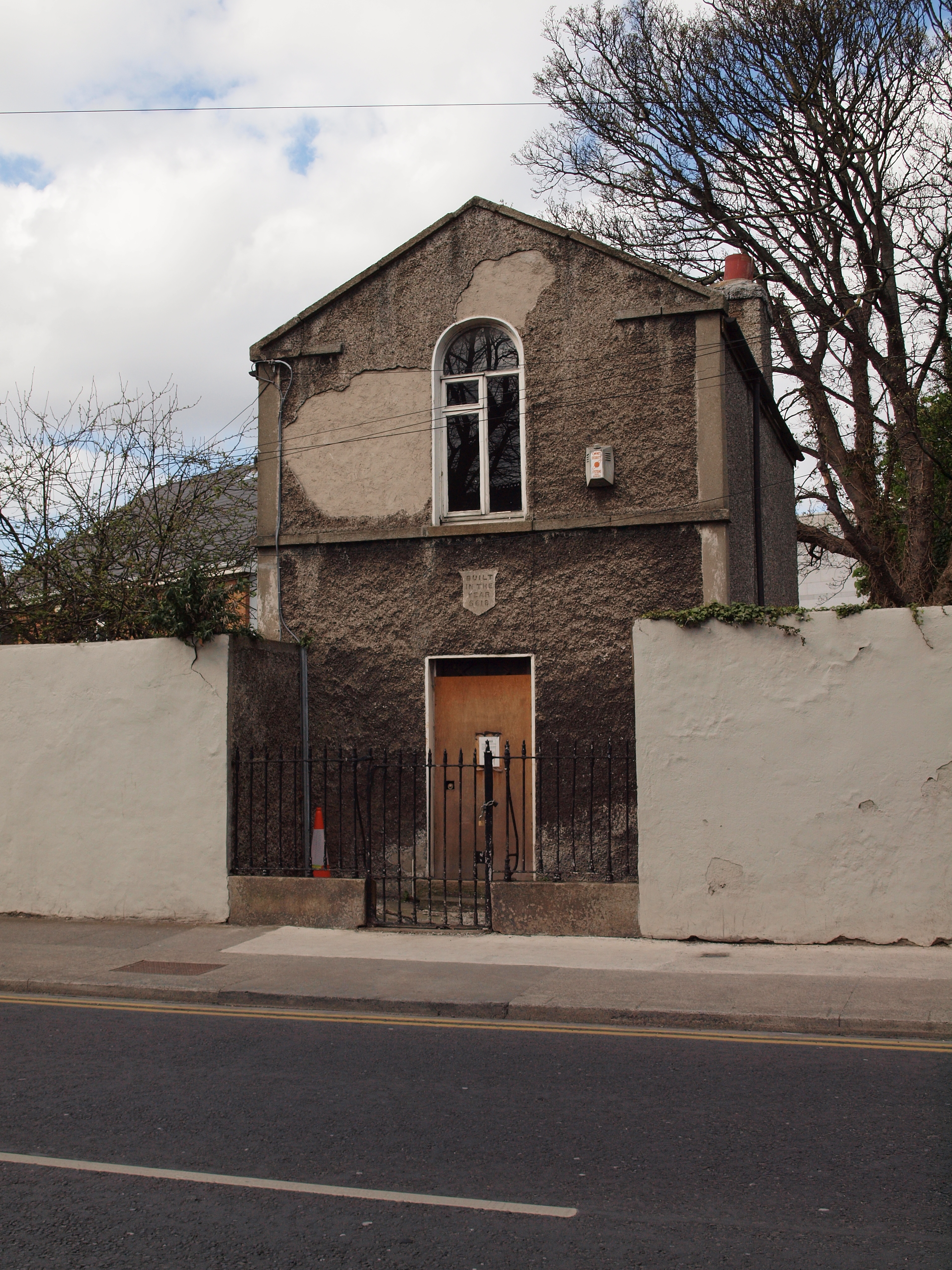
Gate lodge to Ballybough Cemetery

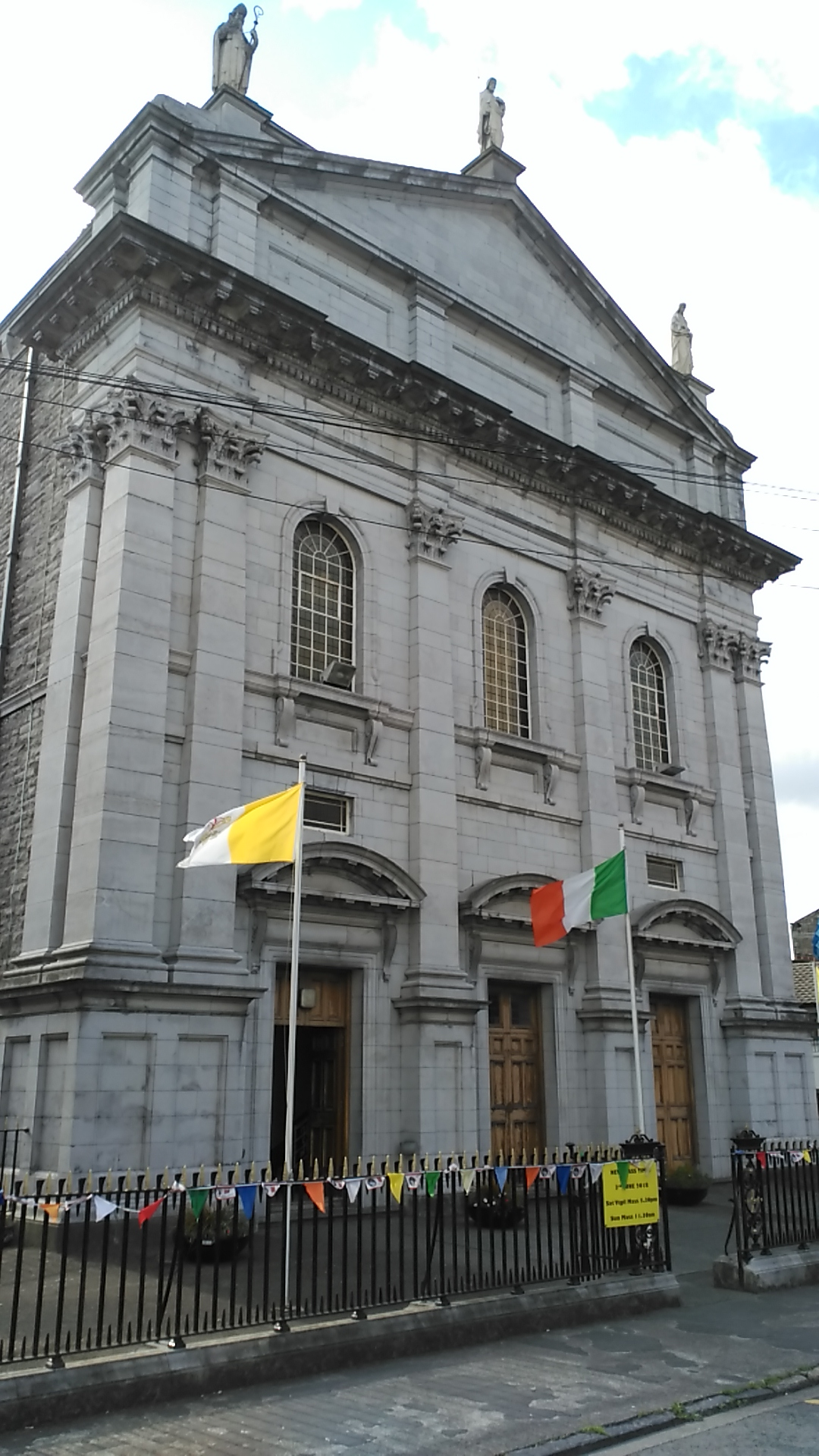
St Agatha's Catholic Church, North William Street, Ballybough

=== Mud Island ===
The first urban settlement was founded by three MacDonnell brothers who fled Ulster during the Ulster Plantations in 1605. They sought refuge in 'Mud Island' or 'Críonán/Críonach' in Ballybough as few people lived there at the time, and reigned as 'kings' of the area, a nickname which is honoured in 'Kings' Avenue' off Ballybough Road. A village of mud houses was established on the island that lay off the sloblands along the estuary of the Liffey, and is thought to have been accessible by foot at low tide. The Irish Builder described Mud Island as being "between the Royal Canal and the River Tolka on the north and sound and being bounded east and west by the North Strand and Ballybough Road; but we think we may with some degree of truth affirm it received its name from its low marsh situation, and from being at one time at no distant date under the influence of the sea.

Mud Island was one of the poorer parts of Ballybough. Its inhabitants lived in badly-constructed mud huts and the area was at the mercy of the sea at high tide.

Then, and for long afterwards, open country intervened between this place and the city, the North Strand was under water, and a rough bridle track extended along the shore some distance eastward of Ballybough Road which was, until the building of Annesley Bridge in 1797, the highway to Howth, Malahide, and Clontarf.

— Weston St John Joyce, The Neighbourhood of Dublin (1921)

The present-day area which was encompassed by Mud Island includes: Newcomen Avenue, Clonmore Road, Charleville Avenue, Bayview Avenue, Kings' Avenue, Nottingham Street, and parts of Spring Garden, Ballybough Road, and North Strand. Mud Island was marked on Campbell's map of 1811 and Duncan's map of 1821 but neither map shows it as an actual island.

The MacDonnell's of Ulster were the principal family on the island and by the late eighteenth century, the MacDonnell was recognised as 'The King of Mud Island'. The islanders elected the king, who was often but not always a member of the extended MacDonnell family. Two of the more famous of these monarchs were Art Granger and 'Grid Iron' MacDonnell. Eventually, the inhabitants of the island became the proprietors of the land they lived on through 'squatters' title'.

The Irish Times ran a series of articles in 1911 on Mud Island involving interviews with descendants of the MacDonnells and other long-established families in the area, which documented tales of robbers, smugglers, and highwaymen who found refuge on Mud Island. Reports of robbery and the apprehension of smugglers in the area can be found in contemporary newspapers as well:

On Sunday, 17 February, about eight o'clock at night, four fellows armed with knives stopped a servant on horseback between Ballybough Bridge and Summerhill, but he having no money, they robbed him of his handkerchief and the saddle on which he rode.

— The Dublin Gazette, 1765

On Monday, 25 February, at night, Mr. John Draper made a considerable seizure of tea from a smuggler at Ballybough Bridge, which with the smuggler's horse he brought to the Custom House.

— The Dublin Gazette, 1765

The Irish Builder, in 1870, noted the changes which had taken place on Mud Island as follows: "civilisation is here though sanitary perfection is yet distant...and the post-master general forgets to remember the classic name by which Spring Garden was formerly known".

James Clarence Mangan used the pseudonym 'Peter Puff Secundus, Mud Island, near the bog' to identify with the area. Here the authorities designated an area of burial known colloquially as 'the Suicide Plot' from which Bram Stoker derived the idea of the cross for his novel Dracula, the cross being the junction of Clonliffe Road and Ballybough Road.

Mud Island eventually disappeared due to land reclamation.

It is believed that the Battle of Clontarf in 1014 was fought in the vicinity of Ballybough Bridge (now renamed Luke Kelly Bridge). Later, during the rebellion of 1534–35, Silken Thomas and his followers battled with English forces at Ballybough Bridge and many of the English were slaughtered. During the United Irishman Rebellion of 1798 many inhabitants of Ballybough and the surrounding areas were arrested on suspicion of being dissenters. Watty Cox, editor of The Union Star was a resident of Ballybough was given amnesty by the Crown for passing on information concerning the United Irishmen.

Development of the O'Connell Street area, then known as The Mall, by the Gardiner family attracted industry to the area, aided by its proximity to Dublin Port, the Tolka, and the Royal Canal. Industries established in the area included Delamaine pottery works, Chebsey's glass factory, Carrothers & Wilson's iron works, McKenny's Vitriol Works, Dublin Whiskey Distillery, Finlater's Brewery, and Hutton's coachbuilders.

Many residents of the area saw action in the 1916 Easter Rising and several plaques in the area commemorate this. Military engagements took place at Newcomen and Annesley Bridges, and the Irish Citizen Army seized a factory at Annesley Bridge and held it for a day.

Further military action occurred in the area during the War of Independence (1919–1921). The RIC Barracks on Fairview Strand was attacked, and the 2nd Battalion of the IRA fought English forces at Ballybough Bridge. One of the most-remembered atrocities of the war, Bloody Sunday, took place in Croke Park. One of the final incidents of the conflict took place on Bayview Avenue when the IRA engaged British soldiers during a raid. Parts of Ballybough were damaged during the Bombing of Dublin in World War II.

During the land reclamation project of the 19th century, Mud Island was also known, interchangeably, as Friend's Field or French Field, before it became known by its current name. The village of Ballybough traces its origins to a series of small dwellings known as Ballybough Cottages, which were later demolished to make way for the Dublin Corporation housing project known as Ballybough House.

== Architecture and landmarks ==
The local Roman Catholic church, Saint Agatha's, was built between 1878 and 1908.

=== Bridges ===
==== Luke Kelly Bridge ====
The crossing of the River Tolka in Ballybough has been there for centuries. Ballybough Bridge was originally a wooden structure built in 1313 by John Le Decer, three times Provost, or Mayor of Dublin, and shortly after its construction was destroyed by floods. The bridge is mentioned in The Riding of the Franchises in 1488: "to Balliboght, and by the gate of Balliboght to the water of the Tulkan by the bridge of Balliboght, and over the water and so by the water southwards".

The bridge can be seen on Thomas Phillip's map of 1685 as a six-arched structure, and on Greenvile Collins map of 1686 as being "on the road to Baldoile". The assumption that the Battle of Clontarf was focused around Ballybough Bridge is based on the battle being sometimes referred to as the Battle of the Fishing Weir, which was located close to the present-day bridge.

In 1534 Silken Thomas rebelled after hearing that his uncle had been executed by King Henry VIII of England. During the rebellion an engagement took place "between the insurgents and the forces of the Crown at Ballybough Bridge resulting in a great slaughter of Englishmen there and in Clontarf".

In 1937 the ancient bridge was replaced by a reinforced concrete structure which was renamed Luke Kelly Bridge in 1985, the year following the Dublin singer's death.

==== Annesley Bridge ====
Annesley Bridge (Irish: Droichead Annesley or Droichead Ainsle) crosses the River Tolka near Ballybough. An act of Parliament, the Dublin to Malahide Road Act 1792 (32 Geo. 3. c. 37 (I)), was passed giving powers to city officials to borrow money to improve the neighbourhood of Ballybough Bridge. Its official title was 'An Act for enabling the Trustees for making, widening, and repairing the road from Dublin to Malahide, and the other Roads leading to Dublin over Ballybough Bridge pursuant to several Acts of Parliament, more effectually to carry the said Acts into Execution".

As well as recommending that the land eastward of Ballybough Bridge, between the North Lotts and the Weir Wall on North Strand (now the area enclosed by Fairview Strand, Annesley Bridge Road and the Tolka), the act of Parliament allowed for the construction of a new road "nearly in a direct line from the Strand Road leading from His Majesty's Custom House". In order to make the new road between the city of Dublin and the north of the county it was stated in the Act that it was "necessary to build, erect, and make a new bridge and causeway, eastward of Ballybough Bridge aforesaid". This bridge is Annesley Bridge which was constructed 1793–1797. The causeway referred to is the short portion of the North Strand Road going from Annesley Place to the bridge and Annesley Bridge Road which leads into Fairview.

During the reign of George III of England, several acts were passed regarding the control of this new thoroughfare. Trustees were appointed with powers to erect turnpikes and levy tolls for the maintenance of the road. Toll gates were constructed at the northern end of Annesley Bridge at the junction of what is now Annesley Bridge Road and Fairview Strand; more toll gates were on the north side of Ballybough Bridge; and a third set of toll gates stood at the junction of North Strand Road and the North Circular Road and the southern end of Ballybough. The toll was based on how far one had to travel and at least one penny. They proved unpopular but remained in place until the Dublin and other Roads Turnpikes Abolition Act 1855 (18 & 19 Vict. c. 69).

==== Newcomen Bridge ====
(Irish: Droichead Newcomen) This bridge was built to carry the North Strand Road over the Royal Canal in 1790–1791 and is named after one of the directors of the Royal Canal Company, Sir William Newcomen. The bridge was lowered in the 1870s. There is a stone oval plaque above its central arch but the lettering is indecipherable. There is a canal lock and a lock-keeper's cottage on the west side of the bridge. The cottage is currently occupied by The Adventure Project, a not-for-profit social enterprise delivering collaborative Adventure Therapy and Outdoor Education experiences to the local and wider community.

==== Clarke's Bridge ====
(Irish: Droichead an Chléirigh) This bridge was built in 1790–1791 to carry Ballybough Road over the Royal Canal. It was extended to the north to carry over the railway line. There is an oval name plaque on it reading 'Clarke's Bridge'. A bronze plaque on the west side reads 'Clarke's Bridge, Droichead an Chléirigh'.

==== Bloody Sunday Bridge ====
(Irish: Droichead Dhomhnach na Fola) Originally called 'Clonliffe Bridge', this bridge linking Jones's Road to Russell Street was renamed 'Bloody Sunday Bridge' in 2020 to commemorate the victims of Bloody Sunday 1920. City councillors Nial Ring and Cieran Perry proposed the name change.

=== Ballybough Cemetery ===
Ballybough Cemetery was the first Jewish burial ground in Ireland and is located on Fairview Strand. The Jewish population of Dublin was concentrated in Annadale, north of the Tolka and in the vicinity of present-day Philipsburgh Avenue. The graveyard in Ballybough was first used in 1718, when Captain Chichester Phillips of Drumcondra Castle signed a forty-year lease with Alexander Felix, Jacob de Porto, David Mchado de Sequeira and Abraham Meirs. The cemetery remained the only Jewish graveyard in Dublin until 1900 when a Jewish burial site was opened at Dolphin's Barn. The last burial in Ballybough Cemetery took place in 1908.

=== Churches ===
Ballybough is mostly in the Parish of North William Street (also known as St Agatha's Parish) (Roman Catholic), with a small portion in the Parish of Fairview (which includes Ballybough Cemetery). The parish church is St Agatha's on William Street North. The nature of urban parishes, however, means that Catholic residents Ballybough attend mass and other services in adjoining parishes like the parishes of East Wall, Gardiner Street, Pro-Cathedral, Seville Place, and Lourdes.

The Church of Ireland Parish of Drumcondra and North Strand covers Ballybough and is bordered to the west by the Parish of St. George and St. Thomas. There are two churches in the parish: North Strand Church and Saint John the Baptist in Drumcondra.

==== St. Agatha's Church ====
The convent chapel in North William Street was used from its foundation as a Chapel of Ease for St Mary's Pro-Cathedral. The Parish of St Agatha's was founded in 1865. Father Francis Doran was the first parish priest and began the process of building a new church for the parish. He drowned in a boating accident in 1877 and his work was continued by his successor Father Matthew Collier. A site a few yards from the convent was selected and building commenced but the project ran into financial difficulties and construction ceased. Father Collier died in 1892. His successor, Father John O'Malley, took on the project and borrowed money from the bank to continue the work. A parishioner willed the parish £8,000 which helped the financial situation. Father O'Malley became embroiled in a dispute over the location of the new church with the Archbishop of Dublin, a dispute which ended up in court. O'Malley lost and the site of the church remained unchanged. It wasn't until after O'Malley's death in 1904 that the church was completed under the fourth parish priest, Canon Michael Walsh. Statues of the Sacred Heart, St. Agatha, and St. Patrick stand on the pediment, the arches are decorated with paintings of the Agony in the Garden, the Supper at Emmaus, and the Annunciation. Harry Clarke made the windows in the baptistry. The church was consecrated by the Archbishop of Dublin William Walsh on 25 October 1908.

==== Clonliffe Methodist Chapel ====
In 1878, the two branches of Irish Methodism united and formed the Methodist Church in Ireland. In the following years, a process of rationalisation occurred bringing together congregations whose work overlapped. The communities formerly serviced by the Oriel Street and Langrishe Place chapels decided to locate a new chapel on Jones's Road between Drumcondra and Ballybough on a parcel of ground that was acquired by Robert Worthington of Dame Street. The foundation stone was laid by visiting Bishop Matthew Simpson from America in 1881 and the church was opened in on 2 April 1882. An adjoining building was constructed to house a school. The number of Methodists who moved to the area fell short of expectations but the chapel was in use for over sixty years. The society was part of the Abbey Street Circuit. 15 Norman Terrace (now part of Jones's Road) opposite the chapel was acquired sometime between 1885–1888 and served as a manse, although this was later sold when the community dwindled and donations lessened. Services ceased in 1949 and the building was sold to the Castle Clothing Company for £6,120. John Healy, Adrian McNally, Liam Healy and Sham Rudden Abehim purchased the building in 2007 and partially demolished it in 2008. It lay in a semi-demolished state for some years before being entirely demolished. The site is now bare.

==== Holy Cross College Clonliffe ====
Clonliffe College takes in about 35 acres of the area which was once part of the Grange of Clonliffe. The seminary was opened in 1859 for the training of priests until 2000. Mass was said regularly in the church on the grounds of the college into the twenty-first century. In 2018, the Archdiocese of Dublin announced it would be selling the buildings and grounds to the GAA.

==== North Strand Episcopal Church ====
An unlicenced chapel formed part of the original schoolhouse on Spring Garden Street/North Strand and services were conducted there throughout the latter part of the eighteenth century. During the ministry of Rev. Michael Boote, an official church was built and served the Ballybough community for nearly fifty years. A building committee was appointed in 1833 and the site of the present church was secured on lease from March 1836. Rev C.H. Minchin, chaplain of the Rotunda Hospital, laid the foundation stone on 7 September 1836 and the church was opened in 1838. Rev Richard Hemphill was appointed chaplain in September 1840 and ministered for forty-five years. The Parish of North Strand was constituted in 1890 and the church became the parish church. In 1896 the parish was united with the Parish of Drumcondra and became the Parish of Drumcondra and North Strand. The church was electrified in 1911, and an organ was bought with funds donated by Andrew Carnegie. Many men of the Parish of Drumcondra and North Strand enlisted in the British Army at the outbreak of the First World War and the fallen are commemorated on brass plates in the church. The church is nicknamed 'The Ivy Church' by locals.

==== Other churches ====
The Church of the Visitation on Fairview Strand (Roman Catholic) was built in 1855 to accommodate the growing population of Ballybough and Fairview. The new parish of Fairview was established at the same time. St Joseph's on Portland Row was consecrated in 1865 and was in use until 1993.

== Education ==
=== North Strand School ===
The North Strand School was the first important educational institution established in Ballybough. It opened as a Sunday School in 1786, after it was noted that "a total want of education, both moral and religious prevailed among children" in the area. Arthur Guinness, Rev. Henry Irwin, and Rev. Norbert Daly were among the trustees of the school. It soon opened during weekdays as well, and children of all denominations were invited to attend. The first schoolhouse was located at the corner of Spring Garden Street and North Strand, on the site of the present-day 68 North Strand Road. Children were enticed to attend the school with free bread and clothing, but parents who withdrew their children from the school after the receipt of the clothing were liable to be sued.

The extent of the poverty affecting the families of those attending the North Strand School is attested to in a letter to the Dublin Chronicle on 24 December 1787:

It has afforded my acquaintances in the neighbourhood of Ballybough Bridge in observing nearly a hundred poor children of every persuasion, instructed every day of the week in spelling, reading etc., in the Sunday School on the North Strand. The demeanour of these children bespeaks the civilisation of their manners and I beg leave to suggest a plan of further benevolence through the medium of your valuable paper, for those pitiful objects who are half naked and shivering in this inclement weather.

— The Dublin Chronicle

In 1826, there were 173 registered and three teachers employed. In 1829, a nursery school affiliated with the school was founded on Fairview Strand. By 1833 the school was falling into disrepair, and it was decided to build a new one. A site was obtained in 1836, and the new school opened in 1842 with 150 pupils. The infant school was moved to adjoin the North Strand Church and opened in 1899. The school was reconstructed in 1943-44 and opened by the Taoiseach Éamon de Valera on 9 June 1944. The school is known as St Columba's National School now.

=== North William Street Schools ===
The Irish Sisters of Charity opened a convent on North William Street in 1815. In 1857 another order, the Daughters of St Vincent de Paul (otherwise known as the Vincentian Sisters) took up residence in the convent and immediately set about establishing a Catholic school for the children of the area. A new orphanage was opened on North William Street in 1858 and household skills such as needlework were taught to girls there. In 1893 school for boys was established by another sister of the convent, which would later be attended by the playwright Brendan Behan and two Catholic bishops, Bishop Carroll and Bishop Kavanagh. The schools and convent on North William Street provided shelter to over 300 displaced families after the German Bombing of Dublin in 1941.

=== O'Connell School ===
Blessed Edmund Ignatius Rice, founder of the Christian Brothers established a school on North Richmond Street in 1831. The foundation stone was laid in 1828 by Daniel O'Connell, whose name the school later came to bear. Edmund Rice, two assistants, a schoolmaster, and four novice Christian Brothers moved into the school in July 1831 and over 500 pupils enrolled in the first year. The school is still open today.

=== Feinaiglian Institute ===
Gregor von Feinaigle, a former Cistercian and educationalist, moved to Dublin in 1813. He gave public experiments of his new system of mneomonics in the city to aid charitable organisations, and delivered a series of lectures for the Royal Dublin Society. He also gave private lessons to children. He became something of a celebrity in Dublin and several people who had heard him speak raised money to establish an educational institution in which his methods would be used to teach. The committee acquired "two contiguous and most eligible houses" on Clonliffe Road for the Feinaiglian Institute. The first 30 boarders paid 60 guineas per annum and the first thirty-day scholars paid 15 guineas per annum.

The two houses on Clonliffe soon became inadequate for the accommodation of the large number of students who enrolled. Feinaigle advanced the sum of £4,500 towards the purchase of Aldborough House on Portland Row, at the very edge of Ballybough and North Strand. A further £15,000 was paid to refurbish the building and convert it into an institute of education. The Feinaiglian Institute became one of the premier secondary schools in Ireland, but closed less than ten years after Feinaigle's death in 1819.

=== Clonliffe School ===
A small thatched school built of mud, limestone, and stone was built in the grounds of Clonliffe College in 1842, described in an application for support to the Commissioners of Education in the same years as "being quite distinct from and otherwise unconnected with the college".

168 boys, between five and fourteen years old, were registered with the one-roomed school in its opening year, though the weekly attendance was around 100. A tuition fee of one penny per week was charged and children of all denominations were welcomed. The school lasted for about 40 years.

=== Other Schools ===
The Second Report of the Commissioners of Irish Education Inquiry (1826) records several other schools in Ballybough. A Mary Westman ran a school on North William Street, and a Henry Callaghan had a school on Spring Garden Street. There was another school at 2 North Strand run by an Anne Williams, and two other schools were located at Aldborough Court run by a Mr. Corrigan and a Terence Colgan respectively. A couple, Mr. and Mrs. Kirschoffer, ran a fee-paying school at 4-5 Russell Place and a Madame Picorgny had a school in a private house on Russell Street. An Arabella Kelly also ran a school from a private house.

The census returns for the 1911 census showed a literacy rate of 95% for Ballybough.

=== Schools today ===
Some of the above-mentioned schools are still in existence, such as O'Connell's and St Columba's, and others have long since closed down. The children of Ballybough are still educated locally in those remaining schools, while some travel to schools in neighbouring areas like Fairview, East Wall, Marino, and Drumcondra, and others still go further afield.

== Sport ==
Various sporting clubs and associations have existed in Ballybough. The most significant sporting association with a presence in the area is the GAA which is headquartered there at Croke Park. The site of Croke Park was once the City and Suburban Sports Ground, also known as the Jones's Road Sports Ground. Ordnance Survey evidence suggests that the site was once an orchard, prior to the building of the railroad - there is a road off Clonliffe Road called Orchard Road. Ballybough, and surrounding areas, play host to thousands of fans on match days.

=== Pigeon Fancying ===
One of the most popular sporting pastimes in Ballybough in times past was pigeon fancying. British soldiers stationed in Dublin helped to popularise the activity. Pigeon keeping was declared illegal in 1916 and birds were confiscated, the British fearing they might be used as message carriers. Ballybough fanciers had to hide their birds and smuggle them around. Ballybough and the North Strand was described as "a hot bed of pigeon men".

In the poor tenement areas the pigeon fancier, that was his sole hobby, that was his religion! This area of North Dublin around Ballybough and the North Strand was a hotbed of pigeon men. There were patches of open field around the back then and you could have four or five lofts in the one field, a vacant site. It was just a tradition here.

— Tony Kiely, "Pigeon Fanciers", Dublin Street Life and Lore (1991)

=== Boxing ===
A boxing club called Orchard Boxing Club was set up in Ballybough in 1966 by Paddy Larkin, father of international competitive boxer Paul Larkin. The club was revitalised in 2020 and work was done to restore the clubhouse on Orchard Road.

== Street names ==
A brief summary of some roads and streets in Ballybough and the origin of their names.

Street names
English name (alternative)	Irish name (alternative)	Information
Addison Road	Bóthar Addison (Bóthar Mhic Ádhaimh	Named after Lord Addison.
Aldborough Place	Irish name to be confirmed (Plás Aldborough)	Named due to its proximity to Aldborough House.
Annesley Avenue, Annesley Bridge Road, Annesley Place	Ascaill Annesley, Bóthar Dhroichead Annesley, Plás Annesley ("" Ainsle)	Named after Richard Annesley, one of the first directors of the Royal Canal Company.
Ardilaun Road, Ardilaun Square	Bóthar Ardoileáin, Cearnóg Ardoileáin	Named after Lord Ardilaun, Sir Arthur Guinness. He received the title baron in 1880. Ardilaun is the name of an island in Lough Corrib, near his residence in Galway.
Austins Cottages	Irish name to be confirmed (Iostáin Aibhistín	Named during the 1950s and formerly part of 'Taaffe's Village'.
Ballybough Avenue, Ballybough Court, Ballybough Lane, Ballybough Road	Ascaill an Bhaile Bhoicht, Cúirt an Bhaile Bhoicht, Lána an Bhaile Bhoicht, Bóthar an Bhaile Bhoicht	All named for the area, meaning 'the Poor Town' in Irish. The first six houses built in 1815 on what became Ballybough Road were known as Edward Terrace, named after Prince Edward, Duke of Kent and Strathearn, the son of George III. The houses no longer stand.
Bayview Avenue	Ascaill Radharc an Chuain	Dublin Bay was visible from here until the middle of the nineteenth century.
Brendan Behan Court	Cúirt Bhreandáin Uí Bheacháin	Named for the playwright Brendan Behan who was from the area.
Cadogan Road	Bóthar Cadogan (Bóthar Ceadagáin)	Named after the Earl of Cadogan, who was Lord Lieutenant of Ireland from 1895 to 1902.
Charlemont Parade	Irish name to be confirmed (Paráid Charlemont)	Named after James Caulfield, the Earl of Charlemont. He was Commander in Chief of the Volunteers in the 1780s. He built the Casino in Marino and what is now known as the Hugh Lane Gallery on Parnell Square.
Charleville Avenue, Charleville Mall	Ascaill Charleville, Irish name to be confirmed (Ascaill Ráth Lúirc, Meal Charleville/Ráth Lúirc)	Lord Monck owned land in the area. His home in Bray was called Charleville. The Irish version 'Ráth Lúirc' comes from the incorrect assumption that it was named for Charleville in Cork.
Clinchs Court (Clinches Court)	Cúirt an Chlinsigh	Named after the highwayman Larry Clinch. He frequently robbed Ulster Mail coaches in Ballybough and was killed by the Tipperary Militia while in the process of plundering Clonliffe House. His body was buried at the Suicide Plot at the end of Clonliffe Road.
Dunne Street	Sráid Uí Dhoinn	Built in 1840.
Fairview Passage (Egg Lane), Fairview Strand	Pasáiste an Bhaile Bhoicht (Lána na nUbh), Trá an Bhaile Bhoicht	Ballybough Cemetery is located here, Fairview Passage is also called Egg Lane after the egg shop on it.
Foster Place North	Plás Foster Thuaidh	Named after the last Speaker of the House of Commons, John Foster.
Jones's Road	Bóthar Mhic Sheoin	Named after Frederick E. 'Buck' Jones (1959–1834), who lived in the area in the eighteenth and nineteenth centuries. He built this road to enable him to visit the city without having to use the dangerous Ballybough Road.
Kings' Avenue (King's/Kings Avenue)	Sráid na Ríthe	Named after the MacDonnell family who fled to Ballybough during the Ulster Plantations in the early seventeenth century and 'ruled' as 'monarchs' of the area. Sometimes mistakenly spelt King's.
Mounjoy Parade	Paráid Mhuinseo	Named after Luke Gardiner (1745–1798), Baron and Viscount Mountjoy.
Newcomen Avenue, Newcomen Court	Ascaill Newcomen, Cúirt Newcomen ("" Niúcaman)	Named after Sir William Newcomen, one of the directors of the Royal Canal Company.
North Circular Road	An Cuarbhóthar Thuaidh	Former northern limit of the city and southern limit of Ballybough.
North Great Clarence Street	Sráid Clarence Mhór Thuaidh	Named after the Duke of Clarence, who later became King William IV of England.
North Richmond Street, Richmond Cottages, Richmond Crescent, Richmond Lane, Richmond Parade	Irish names to be confirmed (Sráid Risteamainn Thuaidh, Iostáin Risteamainn, Corrán Risteamainn, Lána Risteamainn, Paráid Risteamainn)	Possibly named after Charles Lennox, the 4th Duke of Richmond, or named after the nearby townland of Richmond which long predates the Duke.
North Strand Road	Bóthar na Trá Thuaidh	In de Gomme's map of 1673, this is shown as a trackway and "the road to Hoath". Prior to 1792, the Wide Street Commissioners began to use the name North Strand Road.
North William Street	Sráid Liam Thuaidh	Named after William, the Duke of Clarence, who later became King William IV of England.
Nottingham Street	Sráid Nottingham	Built in 1798 and named after Nottingham House, also known as The Red House, which stood here.
O'Sullivan Avenue	Ascaill Uí Shúilleabháin	Possibly named after Timothy Daniel Sullivan, Lord Mayor of Dublin from 1886 to 1887.
Poplar Row	Rae na bPoibleog	It is assumed poplar trees used to grow here. Built in 1823 to connect Clonliffe Road with East Wall Road.
Portland Row	Rae Portland (Rae Phortlainne)	Named after the 3rd Duke of Portland.
Russell Street	Sráid an Ruiséalaigh	Possibly named after John Russell the 4th Duke of Bedford or his grandson John Russell the 6th Duke of Bedford. Both men were Lord Lieutenant of Ireland (the 4th Duke from 1757 to 1761, and the 6th Duke from 1806 to 1807. Another possible namesake is another unrelated John Russell, who was responsible for much construction in the area.
Sackville Avenue, Sackville Gardens	Ascaill Sackville, Gairdíní Sackville ("" Saicbhil	Named after Rev. Sackville Usher Lee, a clergyman who lived in Exeter in England but owned property in Ballybough.
Spring Garden Street	Sráid Ghairdíní an Earraigh	Named after an old public tea garden, a place of recreation where people would gather to socialise.
Taaffe's Place	Plás an Táthaigh	Named after a family who came to Ireland with Strongbow and were landowners in Clontarf. They later handed their lands to the Knights Templar.
Summerhill Parade	Paráid Summer (Paráid Chríonáin)	This used to be known as Farmer's Hill.
Tom Clarke House	Teach Thomáis Uí Chléirigh	Named after the Fenian Tom Clarke, who lived nearby while the Easter Rising was being planned in 1916.
Waterloo Avenue	Ascaill Waterloo (Ascaill Uatarlú)	Named after the Battle of Waterloo in 1815
Wellesley Place	Plás Wellesley	Named after Arthur Wellesley, Duke of Wellington who was victorious at the Battle of Waterloo.

== Notable residents ==
- Brendan Behan lived on Russell Street, of which Brendan Behan Court is now located.
- Curtis Fleming, from Tolka Road, played International football for Ireland.
- Luke Kelly of The Dubliners folk group, lived in the area.
- Paddy Moore, from Clonliffe Avenue, played International football for Ireland.
- John O'Donovan, place-names expert and Irish-language scholar, who translated the Annals of the Four Masters lived in the area.
- Edmund Rice and Matt Talbot resided for periods of time in Ballybough, and Talbot was a student at O'Connell School on Richmond Street.
- Jim Sheridan director of My Left Foot and The Field.
- Edward Smyth, the stonemason whose work can be seen on the Custom House, the Four Courts, the Bank of Ireland, and the Chapel Royal in Dublin Castle, lived in Ballybough.

Liam Ring (Ó Rinn) GPO Garrison 1916, interned in Frongoch and Ballykindlar and translator of the "Soldiers' Song" into Amhrán na bhFiann lived in Sackville Gardens. Oscar Traynor, Minister lived on Clonmore Terrace and Bayview Avenue. Liam Ring's grand nephew, Nial Ring, former Lord Mayor of Dublin (2018/19) was born and reared in Ballybough.
