= Moore baronets of Hancox (1919) =

Escutcheon of the Moore baronets of Hancox

The Moore baronetcy, of Hancox in Whatlington in the County of Sussex, was created in the Baronetage of the United Kingdom on 28 May 1919 for Norman Moore, President of the Royal College of Physicians from 1918 to 1921.

== Moore baronets, of Hancox (1919) ==
- Sir Norman Moore, 1st Baronet (1847–1922)
- Sir Alan Hilary Moore, 2nd Baronet (1882–1959)
- Sir Norman Winfrid Moore, 3rd Baronet (1923–2015). He established his claim to the title but did not use it.
- Sir Peter Alan Cutlack Moore, 4th Baronet (born 1951)

The heir apparent is the present holder's son Paul Edwardes Moore (born 1990).

== Extended family ==
The journalist Charles Moore, Baron Moore of Etchingham is the son of Richard Gillachrist Moore, brother of the 3rd Baronet.
