= Norman W. Moore =

British conservationist and dragonfly researcher (1923–2015)

- Born: 24 February 1923; London, United Kingdom
- Died: 21 October 2015 (aged 92); Swavesey, United Kingdom

Academic background
- Education: Trinity College, Cambridge (BA); Bristol University (PhD)

Academic work
- Discipline: Zoologist
- Institutions: Nature Conservancy; Monks Wood Experimental Station

Sir Norman Winfrid Moore, 3rd Baronet (24 February 1923 – 21 October 2015) was a British conservationist and author who worked extensively on studies of dragonflies and their habitats and was one of the first people to observe and warn of the adverse effects of DDT and other organochlorine pesticides on wildlife. The Independent described him in his obituary as one of the most influential figures in nature conservation in the second half of the 20th century.

== Early life and education ==
Moore was born in London in 1923, the son of Sir Alan Hilary Moore, 2nd Baronet, of Hancox. He was also the grandson of the doctor and medical historian Sir Norman Moore, the first Baronet. He was educated at Eton College and Trinity College, Cambridge. He graduated during the Second World War, and then served in the Royal Artillery in the last two years of the war, reaching the rank of Lieutenant. He saw action in the Netherlands and Germany, was wounded, and became a prisoner of war.

After the war he studied for a PhD at Bristol University, being awarded the doctorate in 1954, with a thesis on agonistic behaviour.

== Career ==
From 1953, he was a scientific officer for the Nature Conservancy (later the Nature Conservancy Council) in various roles, including that of Chief Advisory Officer, until 1983. From 1979 to 1983, he was also Visiting Professor of Environmental Studies at Wye College, which was then part of the University of London. Moore was a founding member and later chairman of the Farming and Wildlife Advisory Group (FWAG), and also became a vice-president of the British Association of Nature Conservationists.

From 1960 to 1974 he was Head of the Toxic Chemicals and Wildlife Division at Monks Wood Experimental Station where he studied the effects of toxic chemicals on wildlife, in particular, the adverse effect of organochlorine pesticides on raptors. This work led to him developing the "precautionary principle" exemplified by his recommendation that the use of such pesticides should be phased out even though the extent of the harm they caused was not yet fully known. His pioneering work on nature conservation and his pesticide research led to requests for advice from governmental and other scientific organisations in Europe, India, Australia and the United States. It was his work on dragonflies and conservation that led to him coining the term "the birdwatcher's insect", aiming to raise public interest in the role of insect monitoring in ecosystem conservation. Due to his background in dragonfly research and conservation, Moore was invited to chair the Odonata specialist group of the IUCN Species Survival Commission. This international group first met in 1980, and produced a world plan for dragonfly conservation in 1995, which was published in 1997.

Moore contributed to two books in the New Naturalist series: Dragonflies (1960) and Hedges (1974), and his book on nature conservation, The Bird of Time (1987), his professional autobiography, won the Natural World Book of the Year award. Moore was also an Honorary Fellow of the Linnean Society and of the Royal Entomological Society, the second of those making him the inaugural recipient of the Marsh Entomological Award for Insect Conservation. He also received the Stamford Raffles Award from the Zoological Society of London for his "distinguished contribution to the ecology and behaviour of dragonflies". His book, "Oaks, Dragonflies and People" (2002) charted the creation of a nature reserve and dragonfly pond at his home in Cambridgeshire.

In 2003, a festschrift issue of Odonatologica, the journal of the Societas Internationalis Odonatologica, was published to mark Moore's 80th birthday. This included a biography and a bibliography of his works. Several other tributes appeared around this time, including, in July 2004, a special tribute issue of the International Journal of Odonatology, titled "Guardians of the Watershed: Global Status of Dragonflies". The British Dragonfly Society administers an award in Moore's honour, called the 'Norman Moore Award Fund'. In addition to this, several species of dragonflies and damselflies are named after Moore.

== Personal life ==
In 1950, Moore married a fellow zoologist, Janet Singer.

After the death of his father in 1959, Moore established his claim to the baronetcy, but did not use the title.

He died on 21 October 2015 in Swavesey.

== Selected publications ==
- Dragonflies (1960), with P. S. Corbet and Cynthia Longfield
- Hedges (1974), with E. Pollard and M. D. Hooper
- The Bird of Time – the science and politics of nature conservation (1987)
- Dragonflies: Status Survey and Conservation Action Plan (1997)
- Oaks, Dragonflies and People (2002)

Baronetage of the United Kingdom
Preceded by Alan Hilary Moore	Baronet (of Hancox); 1959–2015	Succeeded by Peter Moore
