= Robert Ross Rowan Moore =

Irish political economist

Robert Ross Rowan Moore (23 December 1811 – 6 August 1864) was an Irish political economist.

== Life ==
Born in Dublin on 23 December 1811, he was the eldest son of William Moore, and Anne Rowan, his first cousin, daughter of Robert Ross Rowan of Mullaghmore, County Down, a lieutenant in the 104th Foot. Moore was sent in 1828 to the Luxemburg School, near Dublin, one of those established by Gregor von Feinaigle. In 1831 he entered Trinity College, Dublin, where he graduated B.A. in 1835. He spoke regularly at the Dublin University Debating Society, often against his friend Thomas Osborne Davis, maintaining that Ireland's prosperity would be better secured by closer relations with Great Britain than by political independence.

After taking pupils at Carlow, Moore read law, and was called to the bar as a member of Gray's Inn 28 April 1837; but took up political economy. On 15 August 1839 he gave a lecture in Dublin On the Advantages of Mechanics' Institutions, which was published. He became a member of an Irish anti-slavery society, and in 1841 visited Limerick to oppose a scheme for exporting apprentices to the West Indies, as indentured labour.

George Thompson introduced Moore to John Bright, he got to know Richard Cobden, and he joined the Anti-Cornlaw League. Bright and Thompson visited Ireland in December 1841, and Moore's first major public speech on free trade was at a meeting held at the Mansion House, Dublin, on 23 December, when he moved a resolution in favour of the total and immediate repeal of the Corn Laws. For the next five years he spoke for the League at meetings in England and Scotland. In February 1844 he addressed the series of meetings in Covent Garden Theatre, and was invited to be a parliamentary candidate for Hastings. In March 1844 he contested the borough at a by-election, but was defeated.

When the Corn Laws were repealed, in 1846, Moore remained in England, visiting Ireland occasionally, and withdrew from public life, in broken health. He helped John Lewis Ricardo on his book The Anatomy of the Navigation Laws (1847).

Moore died in Bath, Somerset on 6 August 1864. He was buried with his father in Mount Jerome Cemetery.

== Family ==
On 1 January 1845 Moore married Rebecca, daughter of Benjamin C. Fisher. They had met when he visited Limerick, and eventually eloped. They then took a house near Manchester, as the centre for his work in relation to the League. They had an only son, Norman Moore. Moore left Rebecca before his birth, for another woman.

== Notes ==
Attribution

This article incorporates text from a publication now in the public domain: Lee, Sidney, ed. (1894). "Moore, Robert Ross Rowan". Dictionary of National Biography. Vol. 38. London: Smith, Elder & Co.
