= Moore baronets =

Set index for Moore baronets

There have been nine baronetcies created for persons with the surname Moore, two in the Baronetage of England, one in the Baronetage of Ireland, two in the Baronetage of Great Britain and four in the Baronetage of the United Kingdom. As of 2026 two creations are extant.

- Moore baronets of Fawley (1627)
- Moore baronets of Mayds Morton (1665): see Sir George Moore, 1st Baronet (c. 1636–1678)
- Moore baronets of Rosscarbery (1681)
- Moore baronets of Jamaica (1764)
- Moore baronets of the Navy (1766): see Sir John Moore, 1st Baronet (1718–1779)
- Moore baronets of Hancox (1919)
- Moore baronets of Colchester (1923)
- Moore baronets of Moore Lodge (1932)
- Moore baronets of Kyleburn (1956): see Sir Thomas Moore, 1st Baronet (1886–1971)
