= Clonliffe =

Inner city area of north Dublin, Ireland

Coordinates: 53.36232°N 6.25005°W

Clonliffe Cluain Life
- Inner city neighbourhood
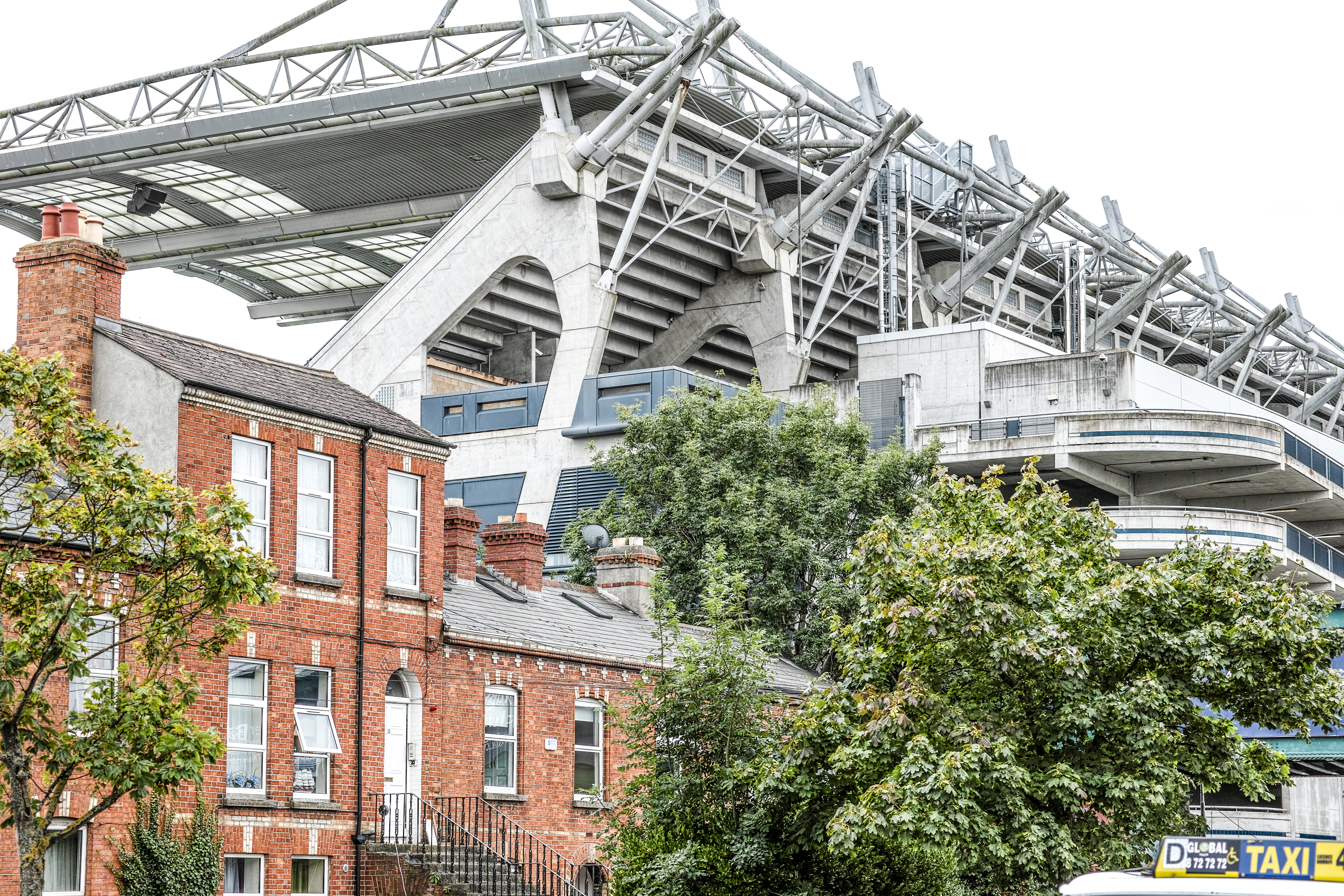
- Croke Park seen behind Victorian townhouses on Jones's Road, Clonliffe
- Interactive map of Clonliffe
- Country: Ireland
- Province: Leinster
- County: Dublin
- Local authority: Dublin City Council
- Time zone: UTC+0 (WET)
  - Summer (DST): UTC-1 (IST (WEST))

Clonliffe (Irish: Cluain Life) is an area on the Northside of Dublin, Ireland, between Ballybough and Drumcondra in the Dublin 3 postal district.

== Location ==
Clonliffe Road, previously known as Fortick's Lane, is a wide thoroughfare that forms the central artery of the area. It is nearly a mile in length. Near the area's border with Drumcondra there is an entrance to Holy Cross College, and to the grounds of the residence of the Archbishop of Dublin. The main access to Croke Park GAA sports ground is from Jones Road, the principal turn-off on the south side of Clonliffe Road.

The historical area of Clonliffe was bounded by the River Tolka, down to the North Circular Road (possibly as far South as Aldborough House).

== History ==
Clonliffe as a named townland is mentioned in 1192, and the name is thought to mean "herb meadow" or from "the plain of the Liffey" in reference to the River Liffey. Clonliffe Road was originally known as Fortick's Lane, named for the previous owner of Clonliffe House, Tristram Fortick, a saddle-maker who began leasing the property from John Graham (an Alderman from Drogheda) on a 94-year lease in March 1710. Clonliffe House, also known as the Red House, is the earliest extant building in the area. Frederick Jones moved into the House and renamed the house and the road Clonliffe. The house was described in a poem by Thomas Caulfield Irwin:

"There was a long, old road anear the town,

Skirted with trees:

One end joined a great highway; one led down

To open shores and seas.

There was no house on it save only one

Built years ago:

Dark foliage thickly blinded from the sun

Its casements low"

At the corner of Clonliffe Road and Ballybough Road, there is an area which was historically used as a burial place for those who died by suicide. Criminals were also buried at this plot, and historian Eamonn Mac Thomáis states that the bodies of the highwayman, Larry Clinch, and his gang were displayed there after their execution.

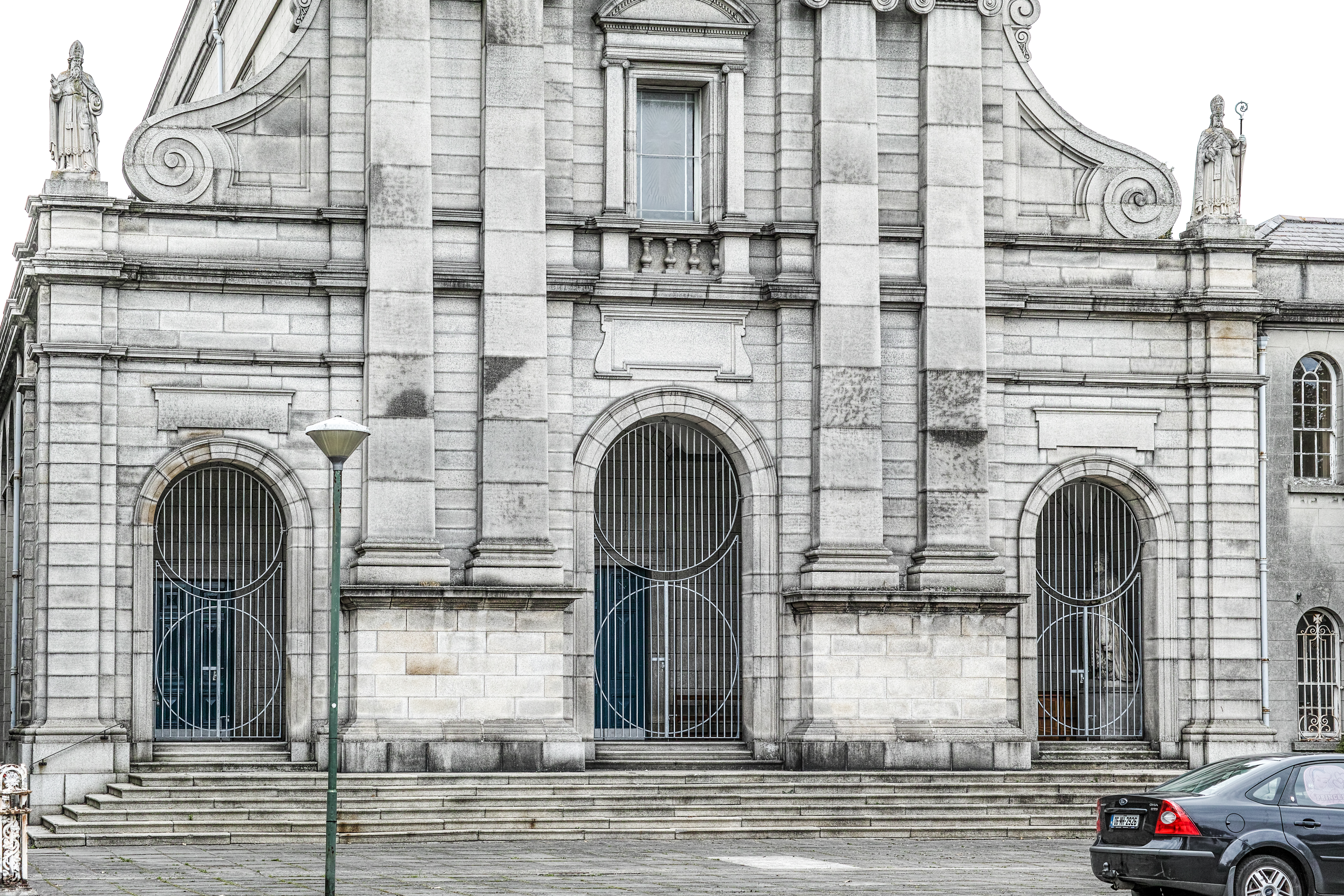
Clonliffe College, Clonliffe

In the mid-19th century, it was proposed that a university be located at Clonliffe. In 1854, Holy Cross College (also known as Clonliffe College) was founded as the Dublin diocesan seminary for Dublin by Cardinal Paul Cullen (1803–1878). The grounds of Clonliffe College form a large portion of the area today. The college is adjacent to the residence of the Archbishop of Dublin, which is located just North of Croke Park Stadium.

Clonliffe Harriers is an athletics club based in Morton Stadium.

Under the Drumcondra, Clonliffe, and Glasnevin Township Act 1878, it became part of the township of Drumcondra, Clonliffe and Glasnevin, within County Dublin. The area was absorbed into the city of Dublin in 1900.

=== Donnelly's Orchard ===
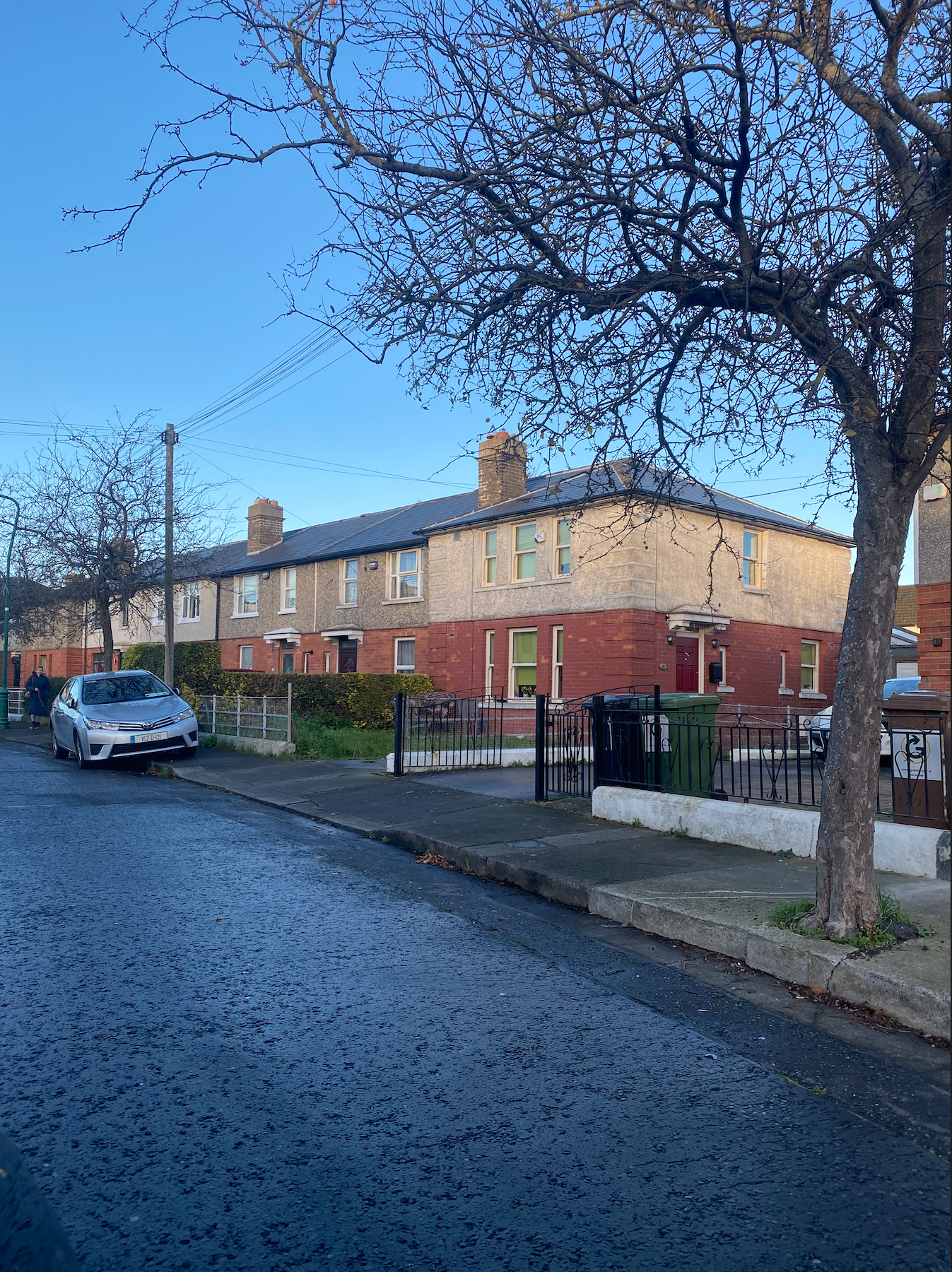
Housing built over the Donnelly’s Orchard area, Drumcondra, November 2022

Donnelly's Orchard was a small housing scheme that Dublin Corporation undertook in 1923. Their intention was for this development to be finished in time to qualify for the Million Pound Grant. This area was a 12-acre plot on the banks of the River Tolka, previously used for allotments. Trustees seemed to be happy for this space to be used for housing, when the use of this space for allotments had ceased. Dublin Corporation's own housing department was too busy to undertake this project at this time, so the Corporation asked Messrs McDonnell and Dixon to undertake the task.

The houses planned to be built were cottages, containing a parlour, living room, three bedrooms, a scullery and indoor sanitary facilities. Although, not everyone in the council agreed and in the meeting in April 1923 there was a proposal for smaller houses to be built so the people associated with the Corporation would be able to afford the rent. In 1933, the development was built to the size it stands today. 10 four-roomed cottages and 138 three-roomed cottages were built. During the same time, baths and hot water systems were installed in the previous housing developments in the area. The 1938 Ordnance Survey Plan displays the completed scheme, which includes the same design elements that are present in Drumcondra today; such as cul-de-sacs and short terraces with substantial garden space front and rear of the house.

== See also ==
- List of towns and villages in Ireland
