= Moore baronets of Colchester (1923) =

The Moore baronetcy, of Colchester in the County of Essex, was created in the Baronetage of the United Kingdom on 25 October 1923 for Edward Cecil Moore, Lord Mayor of London from 1922 to 1923. The title became extinct on the death of his grandson, the 2nd Baronet, in 1992.

== Moore baronets, of Colchester (1923) ==
- Sir Edward Cecil Moore, 1st Baronet (1851–1923)
- Sir Edward Stanton Moore, 2nd Baronet (1910–1992), left no heir.
