= Sir Edward Moore, 1st Baronet =

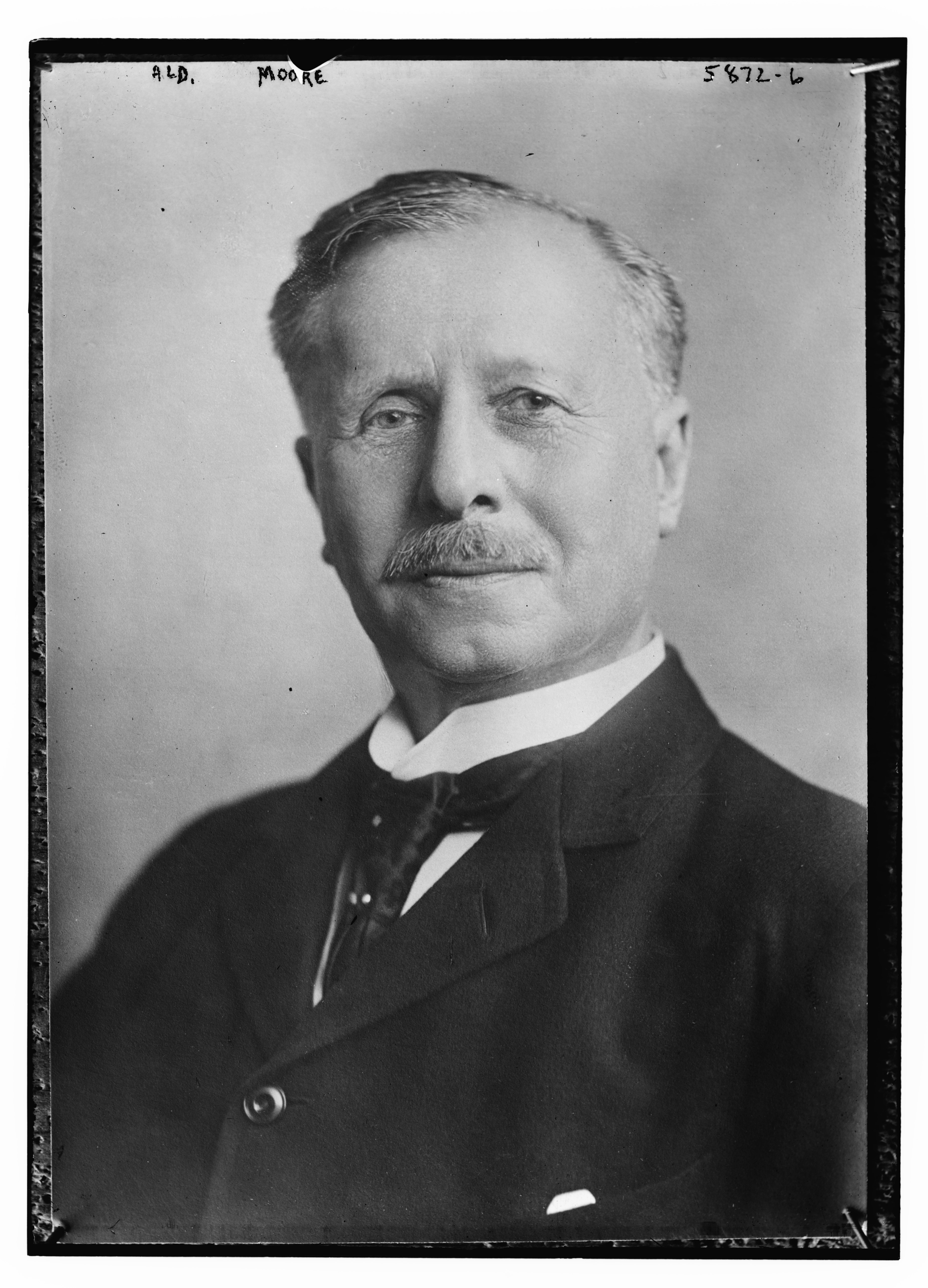
Sir Edward Moore, 1st Baronet

Sir Edward Cecil Moore, 1st Baronet (22 November 1851 – 7 December 1923) was Lord Mayor of London from 1922 to 1923.

== See also ==
- Moore baronets
