= Sir Alan Hilary Moore, 2nd Baronet =

Sir Alan Hilary Moore 2nd Baronet
- Born: 23 January 1882
- Died: 13 June 1959 (aged 77)
- Children: Norman W. Moore
- Father: Sir Norman Moore, 1st Baronet

Sir Alan Hilary Moore, 2nd Baronet (23 January 1882 – 13 June 1959) was a writer and surgeon.

Moore was educated at Eton College and Trinity College, Cambridge, and then trained as a surgeon at St Bartholomew's Hospital. He served in the RNVR for 4 years as a midshipman and a sub-lieutenant, then as a temporary surgeon in the Royal Navy during the First World War. From his observations of sailing vessels encountered between Orkney and Aden during this time, he wrote Last Days of Mast & Sail which describes the many types of sailing vessels both large and small that were soon to be largely displaced by motorised vessels. This includes some 200 illustrations of sailing ships and their rigging by R. Morton Nance.

For many years Moore was the Medical Officer of Health of Battle Rural District and of Rye Borough, and was latterly Assistant School Medical Officer for the East Sussex Education Committee. He was also one of the founders of the Society for Nautical Research. He died in 1959, leaving behind two sons – Norman, his heir to the baronetcy, and Richard – and two daughters.

Baronetage of the United Kingdom
Preceded by Norman Moore	Baronet (of Hancox); 1922-1959	Succeeded by Norman W. Moore
