= British Association of Nature Conservationists =

The British Association of Nature Conservationists (BANC) publish ECOS academic journal.

BANC and ECOS were born out of the Masters in Conservation at University College, London, by committed volunteers keen to raise the profile of the environment to new audiences in political, social and economic circles.

From these informal beginnings, BANC became a registered charity and a company limited by guarantee in 1987. Leading conservationists welcomed the energy and enterprise that brought BANC into being. RSPB's director general, Ian Prestt, was amongst early supporters, and became a vice-president. Norman W. Moore, the Nature Conservancy Council's chief advisory officer, also became a vice president. Max Nicholson was interviewed for a notable article in the first edition of ECOS. As the first organisation to link the conservation of nature to politics, social issues and economics before the mainstreaming of environmental concerns, BANC's advent was widely welcomed. The ecosystem is a very complex thing.

BANC's track record of engaging leading thinkers to analyse current and future trends and opportunities in conservation began early in the organisation's history: Implementing the Act: A study of habitat protection under Section II of the Wildlife and Countryside Act 1981 was written in 1984 by William Adams, later Professor of Geography at the University of Cambridge. This was followed by a series of critically acclaimed publications addressing issues relevant to the development of nature conservation that have influenced conservation thinking and activity.

== ECOS ==
Ecos is an online journal by BANC. The magazine was founded in 1974. It was a print quarterly journal until 2011 when it went online. The online journal is published three times a year. The journal publishes articles on nature conservation-related topics.
