= Moore baronets of Fawley (1627) =

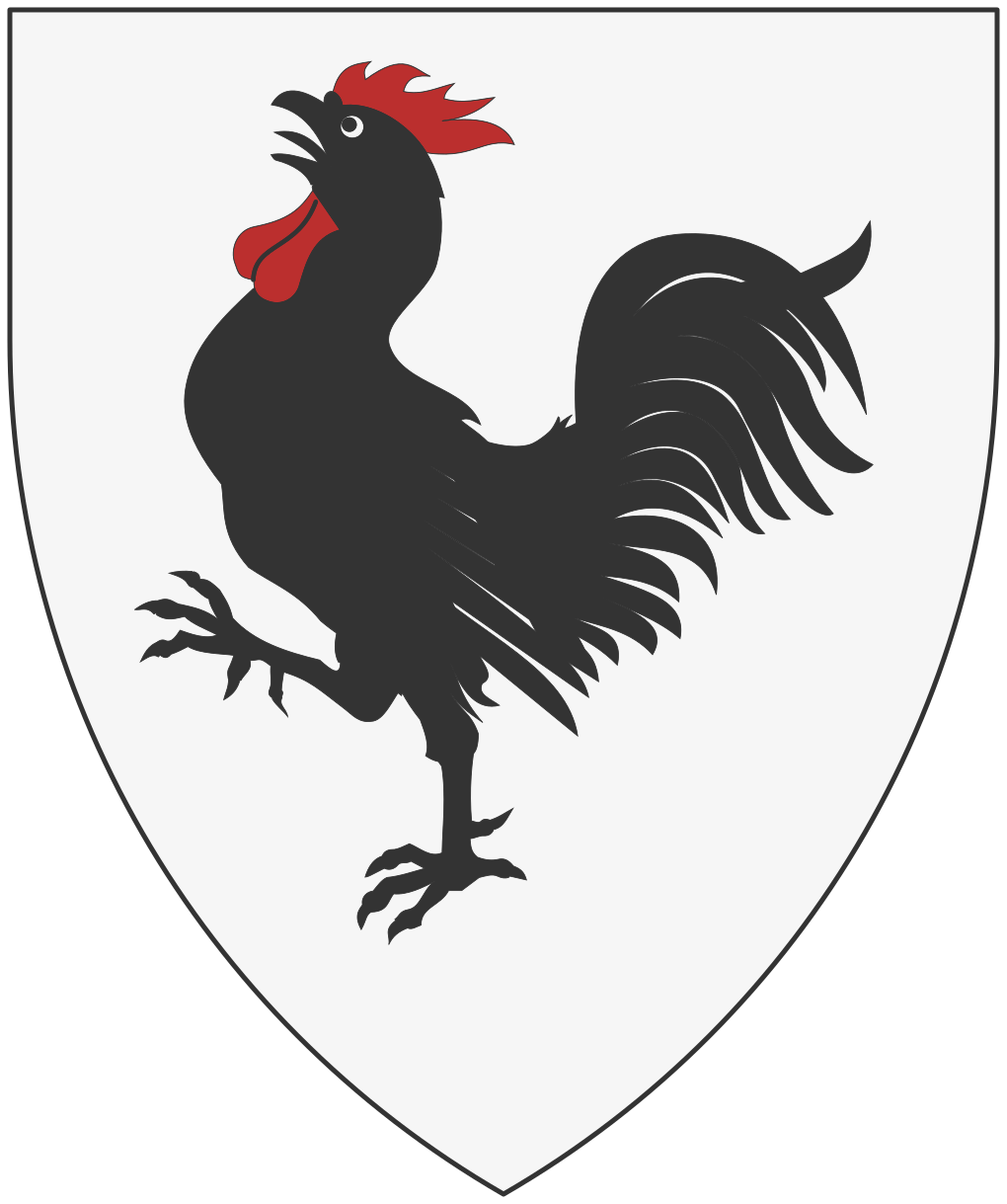
Arms of Moore of Fawley

The Moore baronetcy, of Fawley in the County of Berkshire, was created in the Baronetage of England on 21 May 1627 for Henry Moore, son of Sir Francis Moore. The title became extinct on the death of the 6th Baronet in 1807.

== Moore baronets, of Fawley (1627) ==
- Sir Henry Moore, 1st Baronet (died c. 1633)
- Sir Henry Moore, 2nd Baronet (died c. 1685)
- Sir Richard Moore, 3rd Baronet (died 1737)
- Sir Richard Moore, 4th Baronet (died 1738)
- Sir John Moore, 5th Baronet (died 1790)
- Sir Thomas Moore, 6th Baronet (died 1807)
