= Moore baronets of Moore Lodge (1932) =

UK baronetcy in Northern Ireland

Escutcheon of the Moore baronets of Moore Lodge

The Moore baronetcy, of Moore Lodge in the County of Antrim, was created in the Baronetage of the United Kingdom on 20 June 1932 for William Moore, Lord Chief Justice of Northern Ireland from 1925 to 1937.

== Moore baronets, of Moore Lodge (1932) ==
- Sir William Moore, 1st Baronet (1864–1944)
- Sir William Samson Moore, 2nd Baronet (1891–1978)
- Sir William Roger Clotworthy Moore, 3rd Baronet (1927–2019), Deputy Lieutenant of County Antrim in 1990.
- Sir Richard William Moore, 4th Baronet (born 1955)

There is no heir.
