= Sir Norman Moore, 1st Baronet =

British doctor and historian

Sir Norman Moore 1st Baronet
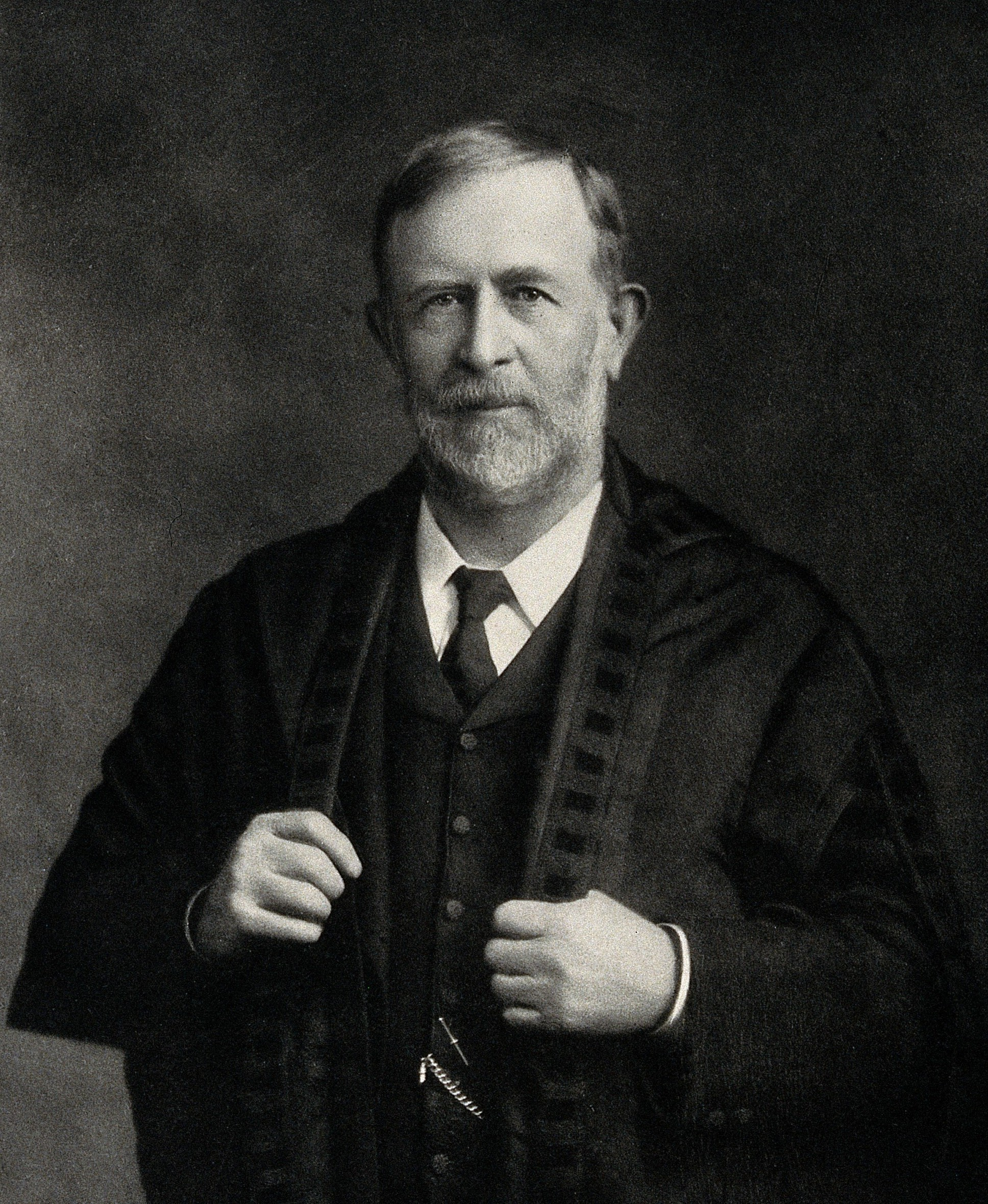
- Born: 8 January 1847; Higher Broughton, England
- Died: 30 November 1922 (aged 75)
- Education: St Catharine's College St Bartholomew's Hospital
- Occupation: Physician Historian
- Parents: Robert Ross Rowan Moore (father); Rebecca Moore (mother)

Sir Norman Moore, 1st Baronet, FRCP (8 January 1847 – 30 November 1922) was a British doctor and historian, best known for his work with the Royal College of Physicians and his writings on history of medicine. Born in Higher Broughton, Salford, Lancashire, the only child of abolitionist and social reformer Rebecca Moore, née Fisher, of Limerick and the noted Irish political economist Robert Ross Rowan Moore, Moore worked in a cotton mill before studying natural sciences in Cambridge and then going on to study comparative anatomy at St Bartholomew's Hospital.

== Early life ==
Moore was born in Higher Broughton, Salford, Lancashire, in 1847. He was the only child of abolitionist and social reformer Rebecca Moore, née Fisher, of Limerick and the noted Irish political economist Robert Ross Rowan Moore. The couple had been estranged since before Norman's birth, and he was raised by Rebecca through the support of her circle of Liberal nonconformist friends at Manchester. He studied initially at Chorlton High School, but left at the age of 14 to work in a cotton mill. He studied at Owens College from 1862 until 1865, and then read natural sciences at St Catharine's College, Cambridge, from 1865 to 1868, graduating in 1869. During his time in Cambridge he met and became friends with Francis Darwin, the son of Charles Darwin, and the Reverend Whitwell Elwin. During his childhood in Manchester he had developed a passion for walking, and had visited Ireland on a walking tour, cementing his affinity for the country's history, people and culture. In 1863 he had visited the natural history collection at Walton Hall, Wakefield, befriending the author and explorer Charles Waterton.

== Influences and connections ==
Moore's friendship with Elwin, a former editor of the Quarterly Review, brought him into contact with important literary figures, including the publishers John Murray, father and son, author and critic Leslie Stephen, and Shakespearian scholar William James Craig. Moore's interest in natural history was influenced by his acquaintances with Alfred Newton, Richard Owen, and Charles Darwin. The recipient of an eight-year residential scholarship at St Catharine's, Moore was invited by university's anatomy professor George Murray Humphry, to assist in the establishment of the school of science at Cambridge. Moore however ran foul of St Catharine's master, the Reverend Charles Kirkby Robinson, during a minor scuffle in the hall. Robinson rusticated Moore, leading to Moore's friend Elwin waging a pamphlet war on his behalf. Though Moore was allowed to sit his exams, he lost his scholarship, and in 1869 he enrolled at St Bartholomew's, London, to study comparative anatomy.

== Medical and writing career ==
After clinical studies at St Bartholomew's Hospital, he qualified as a doctor in 1872. He obtained his MD in 1876, with his thesis, The Causes and Treatment of Rickets. He spent his entire career at St Bartholomew's, serving as warden of the college from 1873 to 1891, and in the roles of lecturer in anatomy, pathology, and medicine, and physician to the hospital in 1902. Moore maintained a frequent correspondence with many of his academic friends, broadening his knowledge to ancient Irish texts through his friendship with Standish Hayes O'Grady, and learnt palaeography from Henry Bradshaw. Moore became a prolific author, producing a new edition of Essays in Natural History, and translations from the Book of Leinster in 1881 and a translation from the German of Concise Irish Grammar in 1882. He contributed 459 lives to the Dictionary of National Biography, edited by Leslie Stephen, and through his association with Field Marshal Sir Evelyn Wood, developed a keen interest in military history. Moore's four FitzPatrick lectures in 1905–1906 were published as The History of the Study of Medicine in the British Isles (four chapters with one chapter per lecture).

He succeeded Sir William Osler as president of the History of Medicine Society at the RSM, in 1914.

One of his greatest works, written in two volumes over a period of 30 years, was History of St Bartholomew's Hospital (1918). The history of the hospital was also the subject of the Rede Lecture he gave in 1914: St Bartholomew's Hospital in peace and war.

Through his mother Moore met Barbara Leigh Smith Bodichon, who in turn introduced him to artists and literary figures including Hercules Brabazon Brabazon, William De Morgan, the Rossettis Dante Gabriel, Christina, William Michael and Maria Francesca, Helen and William Allingham, George Eliot, and Mme Belloc and her children, Hilaire and Marie. Moore became involved with Bodichon's niece, Amy Leigh Smith, and proposed to her in 1876. Her parents objected at first, but eventually, they were married on 30 March 1880 by Whitwell Elwin.

Moore was elected to the Royal College of Physicians in 1877 and became an active member, serving as president between 1918 and 1922 and representing the college on the General Medical Council for 21 years. He was a trustee of the British Museum and was created a baronet in 1919. His old college, St Catharine's, made him an honorary fellow in 1909. He retired from St Bartholomew's in 1911 and was appointed consulting physician to the hospital, emeritus lecturer in medicine, and hospital governor. He became secretary of The Literary Society, and librarian of the Royal Society of Medicine from 1899 until 1918. He was Harveian librarian at the Royal College of Physician, the 1901 Harveian orator, and was elected senior censor in 1908. He combined his medical studies and numerous lectureships with his study and reproduction of ancient manuscripts.

== Family and personal life ==
Moore lived at first at the Warden's House, Little Britain, West Smithfield after his marriage to Amy Leigh Smith, moving in 1891, to 94 Gloucester Place, west London. The marriage produced two sons, Alan Hilary and Gillachrist, and a daughter, Ethne Philippa. Ethne was appointed MBE and awarded the BEM; she married Walter Marlborough Pryor. Gillachrist was killed during the first battle of Ypres in 1914. Amy contracted tuberculosis and converted to Roman Catholicism in 1900. Moore, despite his nonconformist upbringing, did so as well. Amy died on 25 August 1901, and Moore married her first cousin, Milicent Ludlow in 1903. In 1920 Moore received an honorary LLD from Cambridge, but by then he had been aged by the war, never fully recovering from the death of his son, and his writing began to show signs of Parkinsonism. He died in Hancox, near Battle in East Sussex, on 30 November 1922. An obituary in The Times grudgingly wrote that his work ‘lacked that deeper scholarship’ which would ‘render it lasting’. This was refuted by M. R. James, then the provost of Eton College who wrote to The Times on 8 December 1922 declaring that ‘I have never met any man whose erudition was so varied, lay so ready to hand, or was so delightfully enlivened by human and humorous touches’.

== Lectureships ==
- Bradshaw Lecturer (1889)
- Harveian Orator (1901)
- FitzPatrick Lecturer (1905–06)
- Lumleian Lecturer (1909)
- Linacre Lecture (1913)
- Rede Lecture (1914)

Academic offices
| Preceded by Sir Frederick Taylor | President of the Royal College of Physicians; 1918–1921 | Succeeded by Humphry Davy Rolleston |
Baronetage of the United Kingdom
| New creation | Baronet (of Hancox); 1919–1922 | Succeeded by Alan Moore |
