= Moore baronets of Rosscarbery (1681) =

Extinct baronetcy

The Moore baronetcy, of Rosscarbery in the County of Cork was created in the Baronetage of Ireland on 29 June 1681 for Emanuel Moore., High Sheriff of County Cork in 1677. He was attainted by the Patriot Parliament in 1689. The title became extinct or dormant on the death of the 11th Baronet in 1926.

== Moore baronets, of Rosscarbery (1681) ==
- Sir Emanuel Moore, 1st Baronet (died c. 1692)
- Sir William Moore, 2nd Baronet (1663–1693), M.P. for Bandon in 1692.
- Sir Emanuel Moore, 3rd Baronet (1685–c. 1733), sat as M.P. for Downpatrick from 1715 to 1727.
- Sir Charles Moore, 4th Baronet (died 1754)
- Sir Robert Moore, 5th Baronet (died c. 1758)
- Sir William Moore, 6th Baronet (died c. 1783)
- Sir Emanuel Moore, 7th Baronet (1722–1793)
- Sir Richard Moore, 8th Baronet (1744–c. 1815)
- Sir Emanuel Moore, 9th Baronet (1786–1849)
- Sir Richard Emanuel Moore, 10th Baronet (1810–1882)
- Sir Thomas O'Connor Moore, 11th Baronet (1845–1926). He married in 1908 Katherine Matilda, only child of Capt. John George Elphinstone, H.E.I.C.S, of Aberdeen and Passage West, by Katherine, daughter of George Richard Pain, architect, of Cork. The title was dormant or extinct on his death.

== Claimants ==
There have been claimants in the United States, descendants of Charles Moore, a younger son of Sir Emmanuel Moore, 9th Baronet.

Jerry Moore (1942–2010) claimed to be the ninth Baronet's descendant and assumed the title of 12th Baronet. His son, Douglas Cameron Alexander Moore (born 1970), assumed the title of 13th Baronet. But they have not successfully proved their succession to the baronetcy, thus they are not entitled to be addressed as Baronets.
