= Aldborough House =

Georgian mansion in Dublin 1, Ireland

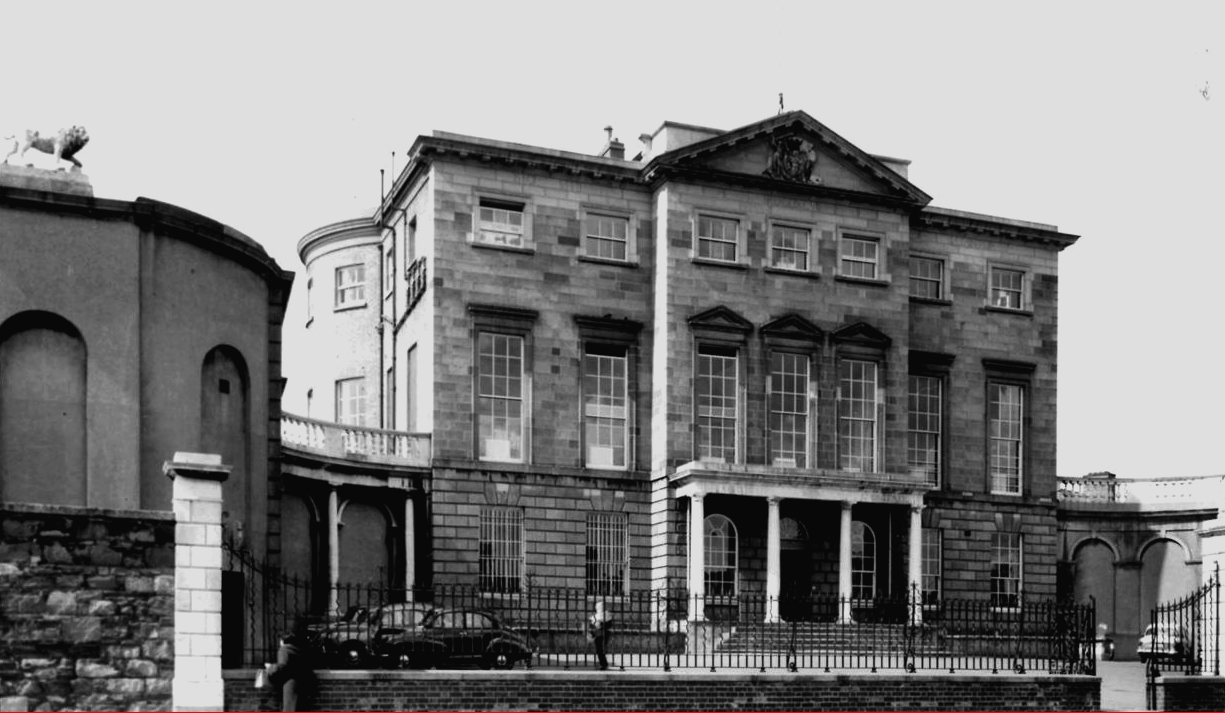
- The house, c. 1940s
- Alternative names: Aldboro House

General information
- Status: Private dwelling house
- Type: House
- Location: 27-28 Portland Row, Dublin, Ireland
- Coordinates: 53°21′18.6″N 6°14′52.9″W
- Groundbreaking: 1792
- Completed: 1798; 228 years ago (building bears the year 1796)
- Owner: Edward Stratford, 2nd Earl of Aldborough (1796—1801); Professor Gregor von Feinaigle (1813—1819; 1830); Government ownership (1843—1867); Reliance Investment Limited (Pat O'Donnell) (2014 - present)

Height
- Architectural: Georgian

Technical details
- Material: granite (front facade) and red brick (rear)

Design and construction
- Architect: Richard Johnston
- Other designers: Thomas Baker (stonecutter); James Hendricks (bricklayer); Filippo Zaffarini and John Meares (plaster and stuccowork); Matthew Cogan (plaster and stuccowork)
- Quantity surveyor: Thomas Dennell (clerk of works)

Renovating team
- Architect: Daniel Murphy (1896-98)
- Engineer: Robert Cochrane (1896-98)
- Main contractor: W Foley & Sons (1896-98)

Aldborough House (sometimes Aldboro House) is a large Georgian house in Dublin, Ireland. Built as a private residence by 1795, the original structure included a chapel (since lost) and a theatre wing.

The house has been used for periods as a school, barracks and post office depot, before becoming vacant in the early 21st century. While vacant, the building was subject to vandalism and a fire, was noted by An Taisce as being in poor condition, and included in its 2021 list of 'Top 10 Most-at-Risk' buildings nationally.

== History ==
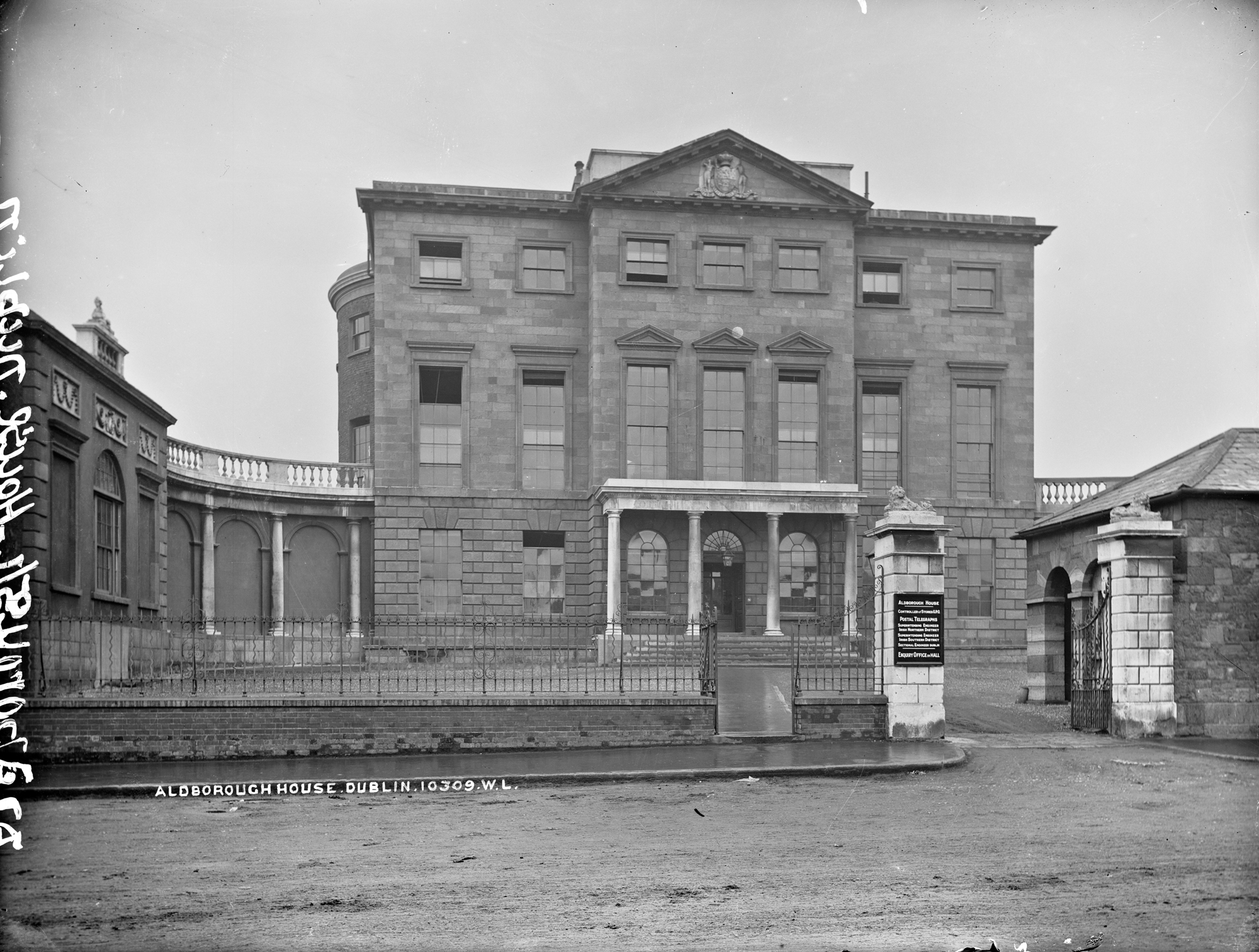
Aldborough House in the late 1800s

=== Construction ===
The house was commissioned by Edward Stratford, 2nd Earl of Aldborough, and the bulk of the structure completed by 1795. Though the foundation had been laid down in 1792, the house was still not fully completed by 1799 at a cost of over £40,000. It was the last free-standing Georgian mansion house built in Dublin. Stratford built the house for his second wife, whom he married in 1787, Anne Eliza Henniker. The construction of the house caused significant financial strain for Stratford, who wrote numerous letters asking for loans, including to his father-in-law, Sir John Henniker.

=== 1800 to 1900 ===
Edward Stratford died in 1801, and his widow died intestate in 1802 having remarried a barrister named George Powell. After her death a long court case ensued between her widower and Stratford's nephew, Colonel John Wingfield with Wingfield finally succeeding in 1808.

The house however remained uninhabited between 1802 and 1813.

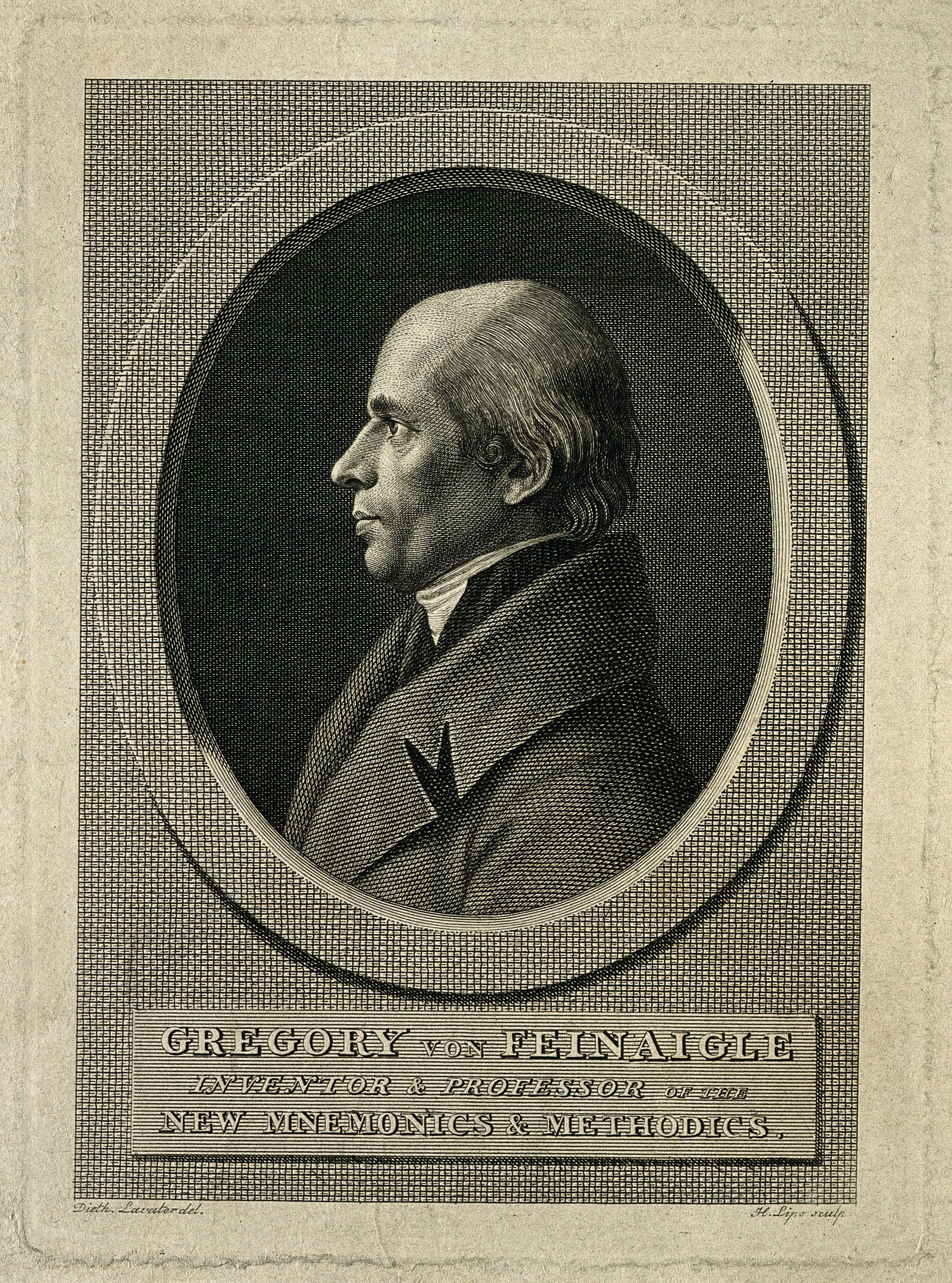
Gregor von Feinaigle line engraving by J. H. Lips.

In 1813, Professor Gregor von Feinaigle leased the building from Wingfield and opened it as a school. To support its use for education, the house was extended to include large classrooms and other facilities, and the theatre was maintained for performance use. Prof Von Feiangle died in 1819 and by 1830 the school had closed.

The house was acquired by the government in 1843, and used as a military barracks during the Crimean War (1850s) and Fenian Rising (1860s).

From the late 19th century it was used as the stores department of the Post Office. The Commissioners of Public Works made alterations to support this purpose in the late 1890s.

=== 1900 to present ===
This change is referenced in James Joyce's Ulysses, which is set in 1904 and in which the house is described as "[now] an office or something". The house remained in the ownership of the Department for Posts and Telegraphs (later Telecom Éireann) throughout the 20th century.

In 1945, half of the original rear grounds of the house were taken for the development of a new block of council flats known as Killarney Court.

Telecom Éireann was replaced by Eircom in 1999, and the Aldborough House site was put up for sale at that time. A number of prospective buyers were identified, with the site passing through the hands of the Irish Music Rights Organisation before being sold to a development company in 2005. It was then sold to Aldborough Developments Limited, and permission to convert it into a private hospital was sought.

The house remained uninhabited and undeveloped for some years after the sale, and was subject to vandalism. Following the theft of lead from the roof, water damage required emergency repair works - funded part by the Department of Arts, Heritage and the Gaeltacht and part by Dublin City Council. In 2013, a suspected arson attack caused further damage.

There were renewed calls for the Irish state to purchase the site following the lapsed planning permission to convert the building into offices in August 2023. As of July 2024, An Taisce listed the site as being "at risk" and recorded that it was "vacant with no identified new use".

== Architecture ==
The initial design of the building was by Richard Johnston, and he is recorded as making some visits to inspect the site early in the construction. He was replaced by John Harris in 1796, and Dan Murphy in 1797. All three architects were closely overseen and instructed by Stratford, whose direct approval was required on many aspects of the design, particularly the interior. Matthew Cogan designed the principal stair very late in the construction.

The main house is a tall rectangular block, 3 floors over a basement, 3 window bays deep and 7 bays wide. The front north elevation is faced in granite, with the other aspects in brown brick which was originally rendered to look like stone. Single storey bowed quadrants flanked each side of the main house, providing corridors to a theatre to the east and a chapel to the west. The chapel was later demolished. The facade is in a traditional Palladian composition but does not adhere to the proportions of the style. Above the portico there is an inscription reading "Otium cum Dignitate" (Leisure with Dignity). Architectural historian, Christine Casey, states that the house is "grandiose and yet remarkably dull". The proportions and site indicate it was built to rival Leinster House.

In the centre of the house is a main entrance hall, with the principle stair lit from above. Much of the original interior has been lost, with fragments of the decoration remaining. The wider grounds of the house were developed for public housing in the 1940s.

== Culture ==
A private theatre wing of the house, known as the "Lord Amiens Theatre", was constructed between 1792 and 1795 and based on designs by Edward Stratford. It is, according to campaigners, the "oldest purpose-built theatre" in Ireland. Though much of the interior was altered during the 20th century, and the original 18th century stage was destroyed in the 1980s, the exterior remains unchanged since the 18th century.

A number of commentators have suggested that Aldborough House inspired the fictional settings used by Dracula author Bram Stoker. Stoker lived adjacent to Aldborough House for a period.

A photographic blowup of Aldborough House is seen within the studio scenery of the 1967 Doctor Who story The Ice Warriors. The Georgian facade of the house was chosen by set designer, Jeremy Davies, to represent the exterior of “Brittanicus Base”, a futuristic research facility located within a Georgian country house in a future ice-covered Earth. The inclusion of the photo of the house within the studio set was supposed to give rise to the illusion of the building being in the middle-distance, beyond the airlock that the TARDIS crew enter into in episode one, but the designer admitted that this “didn’t work”.

== Today ==
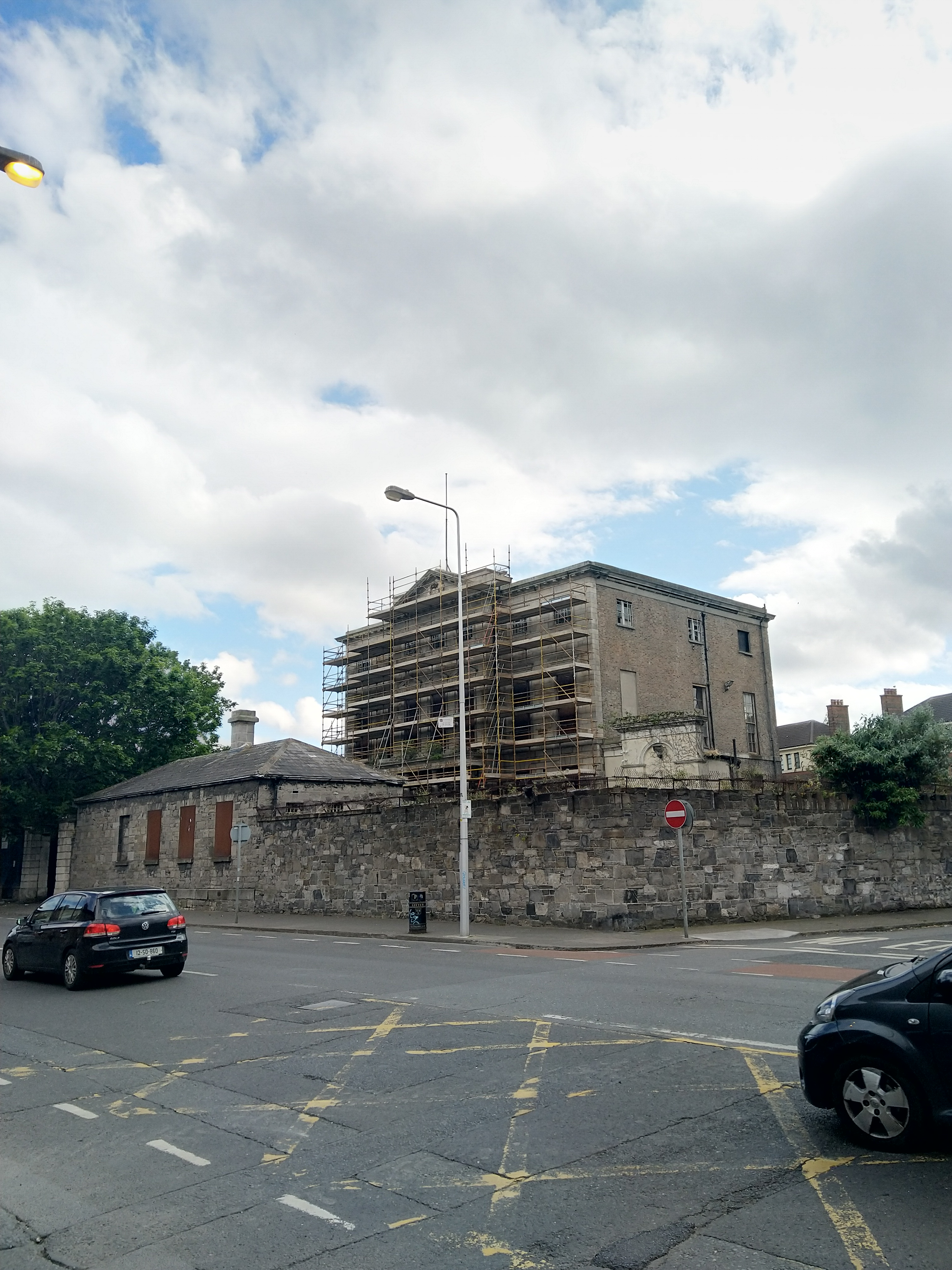
Aldborough House in 2021

As of early 2017, the future of the building remained in question, and An Taisce listed the structure as being in "very poor" condition and at "critical" risk level. In late 2017, the building owners, Reliance Investments, received planning permission for an extensive office development on the site, including restoration of the main building and construction of new office wings. This included permission for the demolition of several out-buildings and the theatre wing. Some aspects of the development plans were subject to opposition and submissions from local groups, representatives of An Taisce, the Department of Arts and Heritage, and the Irish Georgian Society. This included opposition to the planned demolition of "The Lord Amiens Theatre".

By early 2020, no development had occurred on the site, with the owners stating that the renovation "requires an anchor tenant before it can proceed". As of late 2021, Aldborough House was included on the "Top 10 Most-at-Risk Buildings" published by An Taisce. It remained vacant, disused and "at risk" as of 2024.
