= Gregor von Feinaigle =

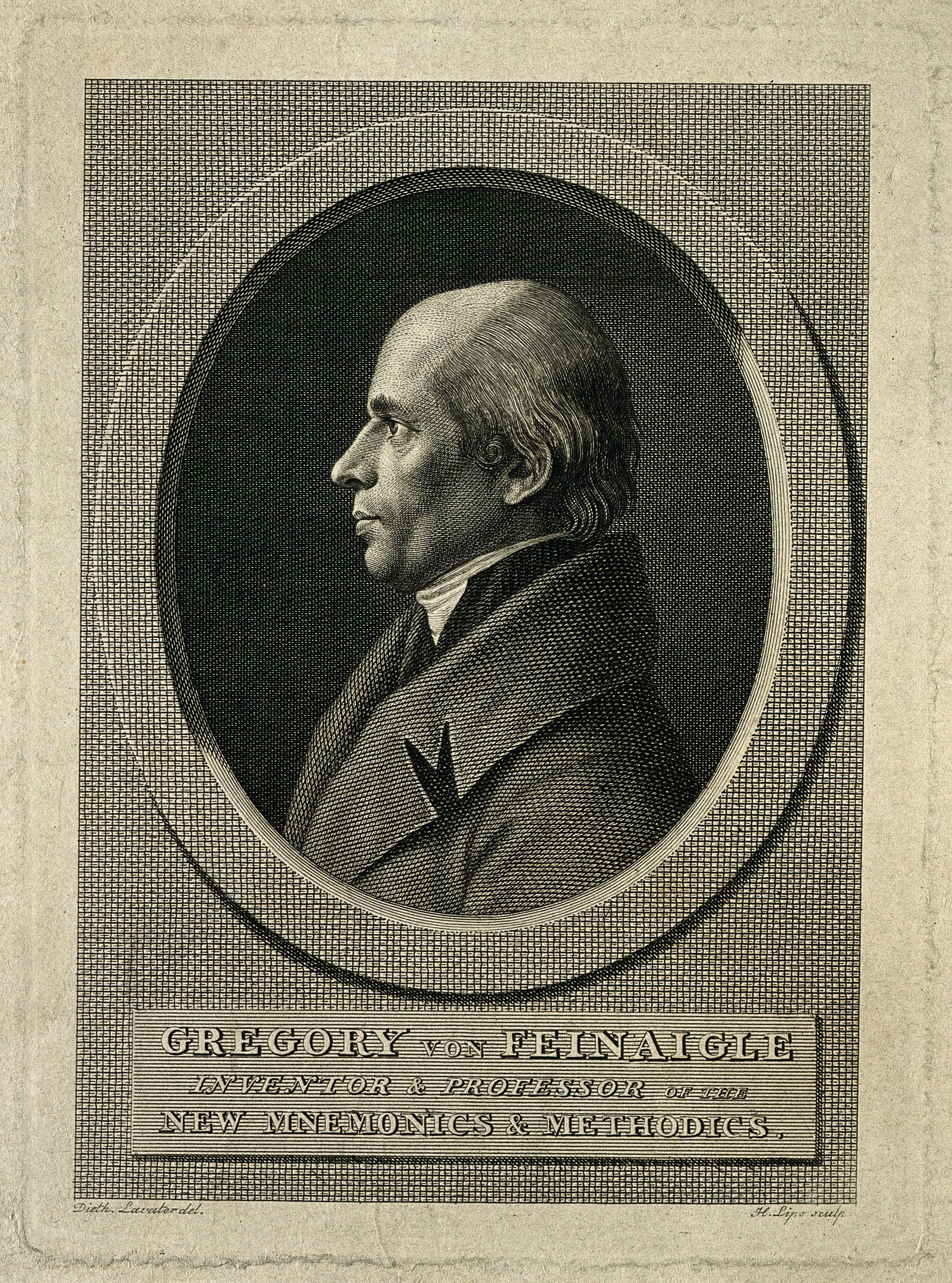
- An engraving of von Feinaigle, c. 1884
- Born: 22 August 1760; Ueberlingen, Germany
- Died: 27 December 1819 (aged 59); Dublin, Ireland
- Occupations: Roman Catholic monk; Mnemonist

Gregor von Feinaigle (22 August 1760 – 27 December 1819) was a German mnemonist and Roman Catholic monk.

== Life ==
Feinaigle was born in Ueberlingen on 22 August 1760. Very little other is known of his early life except that he entered the Cistercian monastery at Salem located along Lake Constance. Obligated to flee the monastery with the other monks due to the Napoleonic invasions, he became an itinerant professor in Karlsruhe, Paris, London, Glasgow, and Dublin.

Feinaigle visited Paris in 1806, and delivered public lectures on local and symbolical memory, which he described as a 'new system of mnemonics and methodics.' He was accompanied by a young man who acted as interpreter. Count Metternich, the Austrian ambassador, and his secretaries followed the whole course of lectures, and spoke in highly laudatory terms of the system, which, though novel in its applications, was founded on the topical memory of the ancients, as described by Cicero and Quinctilian. Feinaigle was exposed to much criticism and sarcasm in the press, and was ridiculed on the stage by Dieulafoy in a farce called 'Les filles de mémoire, ou le Mnémoniste.' By way of reply he gave on 27 February 1807 a public exhibition to an audience of about two thousand persons. He did not himself appear, but was represented by twelve or fifteen of his pupils, who gave illustrations of his art. Afterwards he went on a lecturing tour through various parts of France.

Early in 1811, he came to England and delivered lectures at the Royal Institution and the Surrey Institution in London; and at Liverpool, Edinburgh, and Glasgow. The fee for attending a course of fifteen or sixteen of his lectures was 5l. 5s., and this sum was paid by crowds of pupils, for Feinaigle made a mystery of the details of his method, and was in consequence denounced in some quarters as an impostor. He gained, however, many devoted adherents. The Rev. Peter Baines, afterwards bishop of Siga, introduced his system of mnemonics and also his general plan of education into the Benedictine college of Ampleforth, Yorkshire, and a society of gentlemen founded a school in Aldborough House, near Mountjoy Square, Dublin, in 1813 named the Feinaiglian Institution which was placed under Feinaigle's personal superintendence and conducted on his principles.

He died in Dublin on 27 December 1819.

== Works ==
The major exposition of his system is in The New Art of Memory (1812). John Millard, assistant librarian to the Surrey Institution, was the editor of this work, according to Thomas Hartwell Horne, who was Millard's brother-in-law, and who helped him with notes of Feinaigle's lectures. Other treatises on the system were:

- Notice sur la Mnémonique, ou l'art d'aider et de fixer la Mémoire en tout genre d'études, de sciences, ou d'affaires, par Grégoire de Feinaigle, Paris, 1806; and
- Mnemonik oder praktische Gedächtnisskunst zum Selbstunterricht nach den Vorlesungen des Herrn von Feinaigle, Frankfort-on-the-Main, 1811.
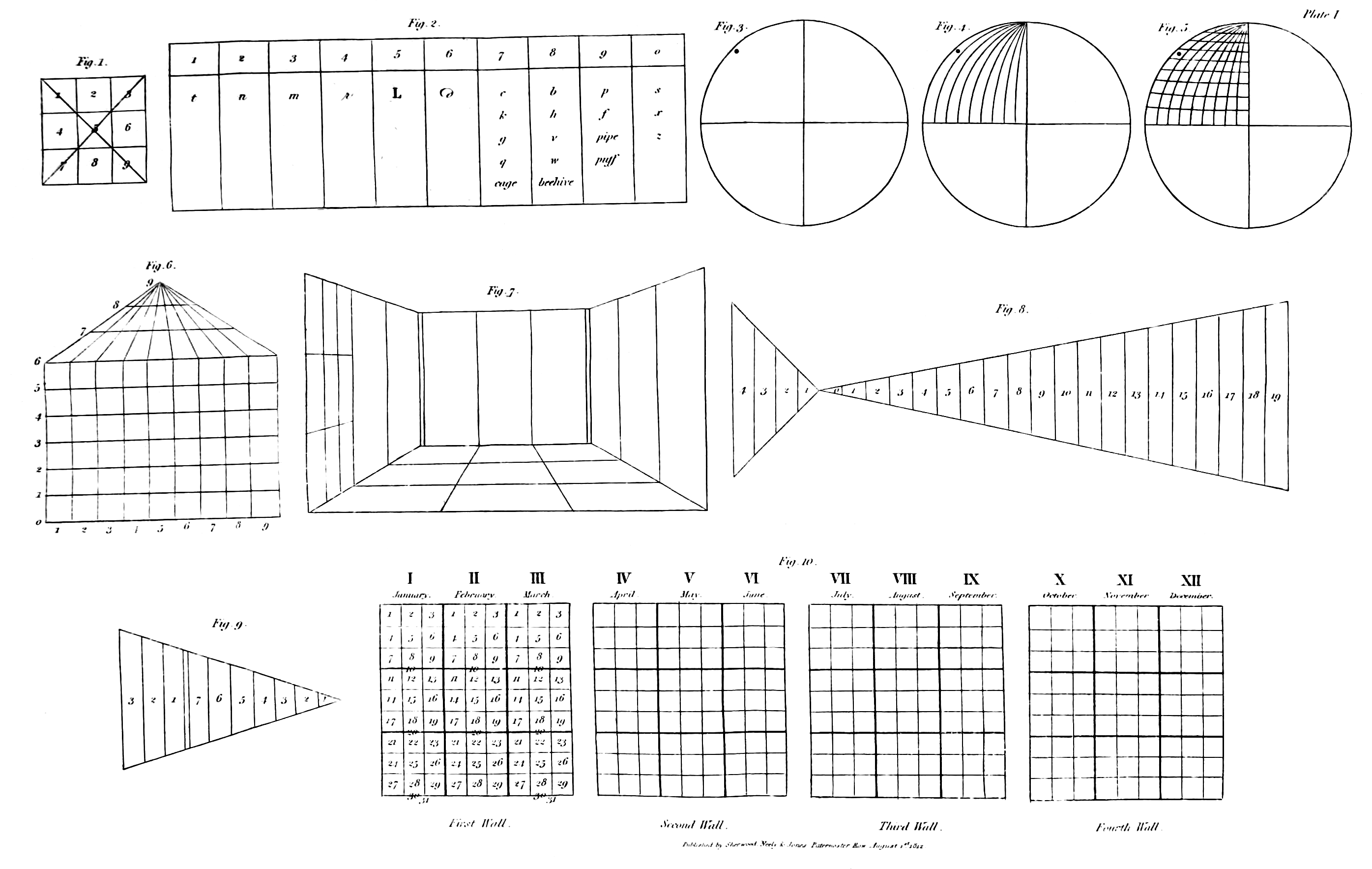

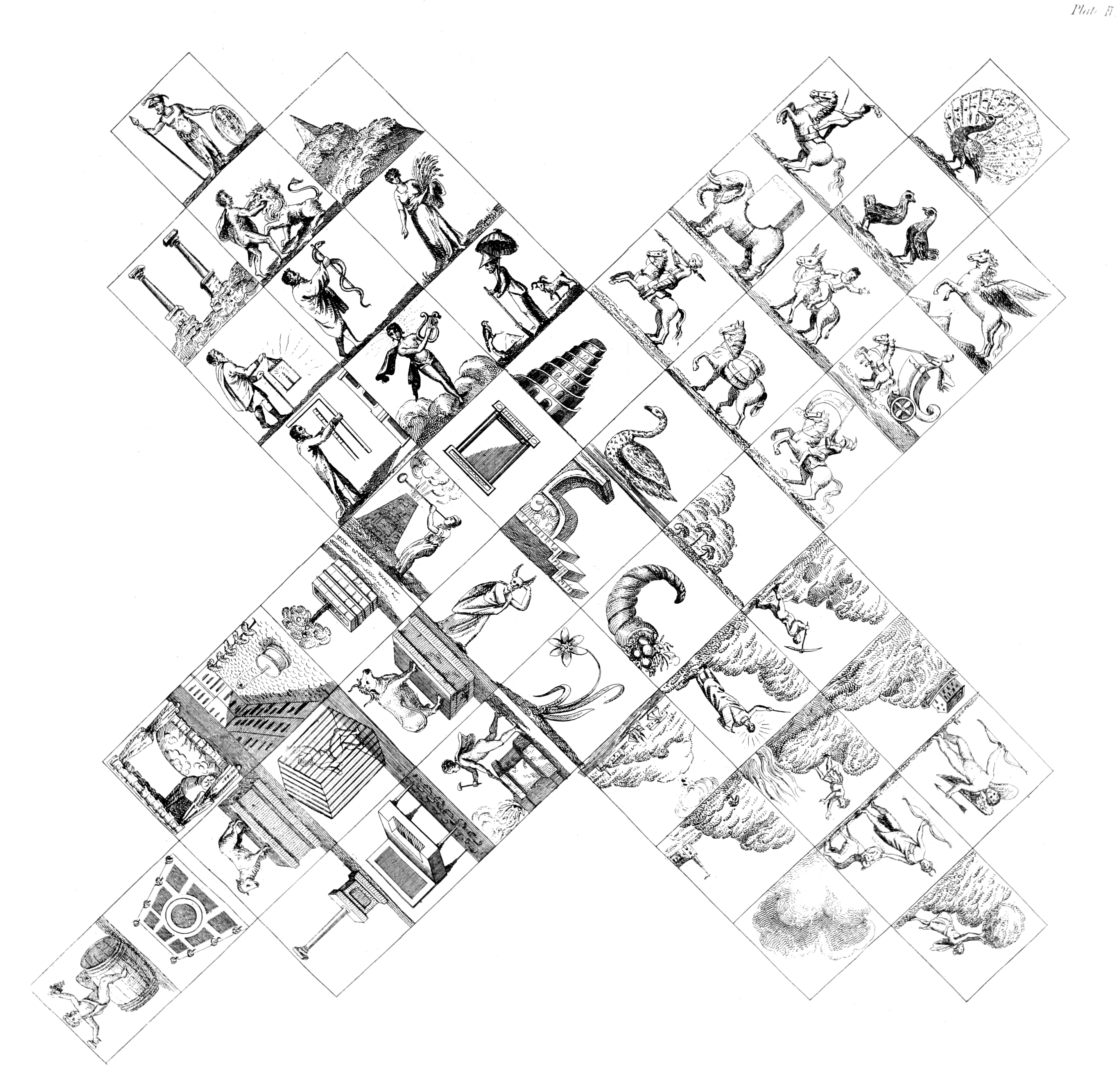

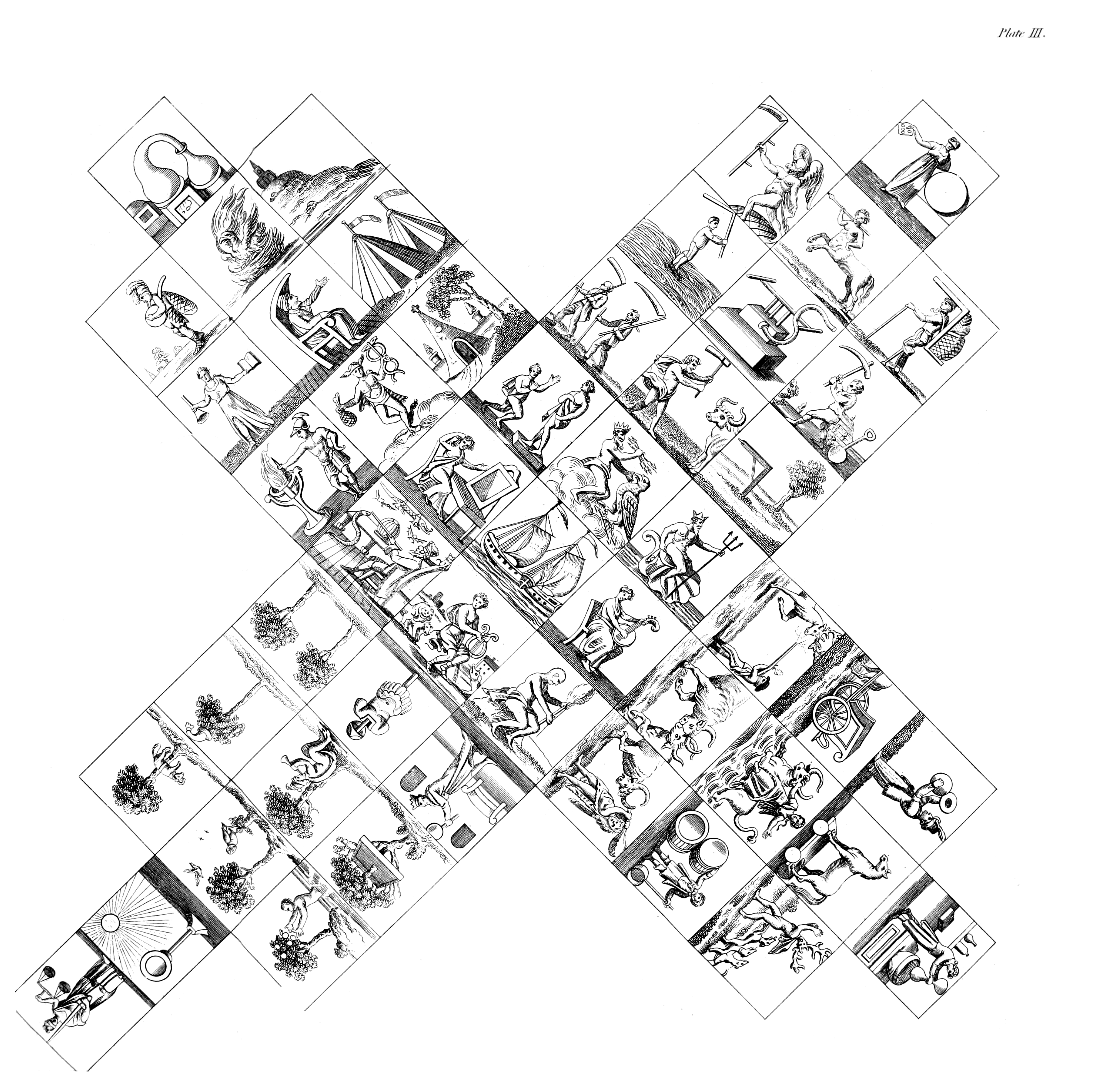

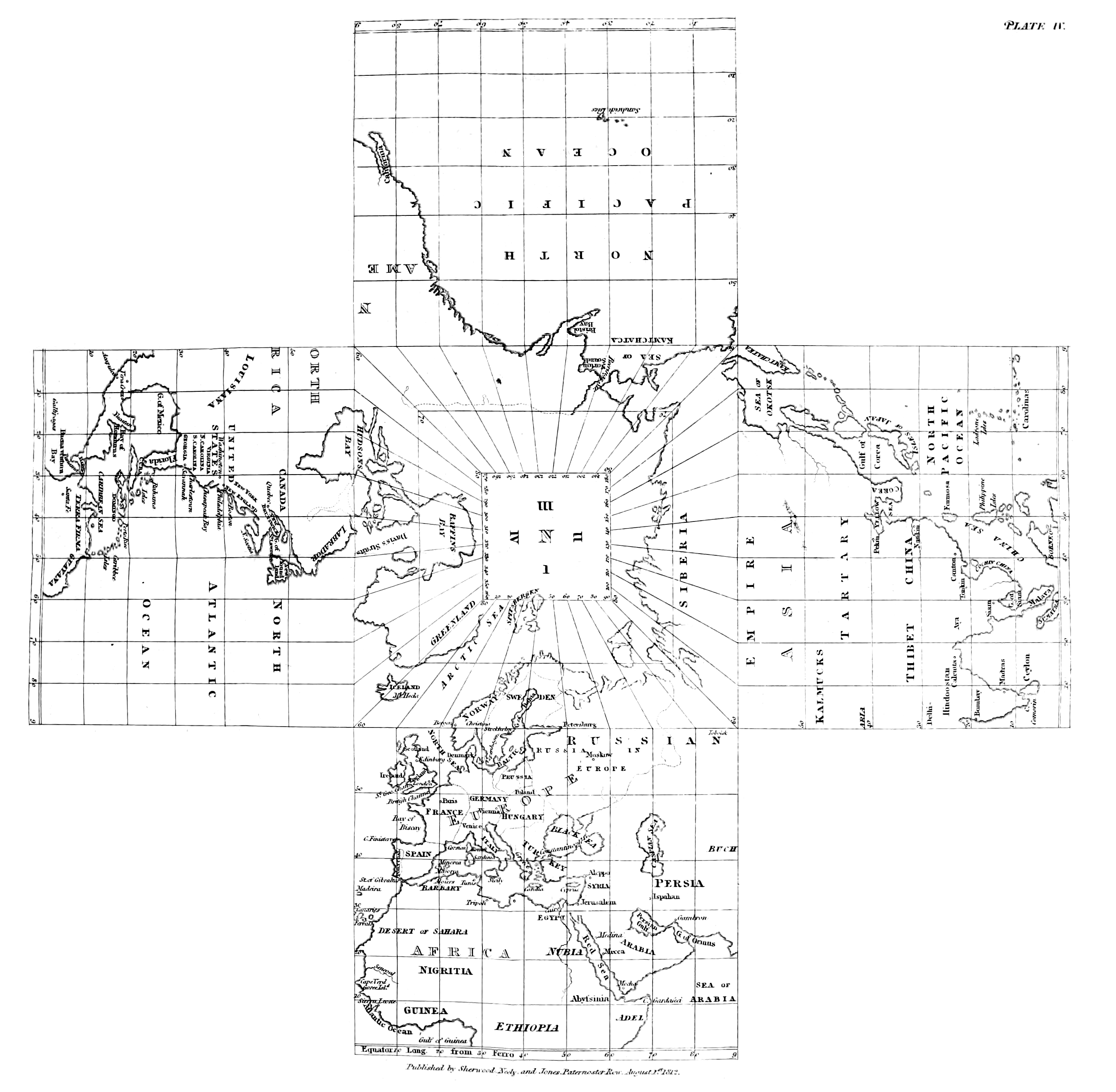

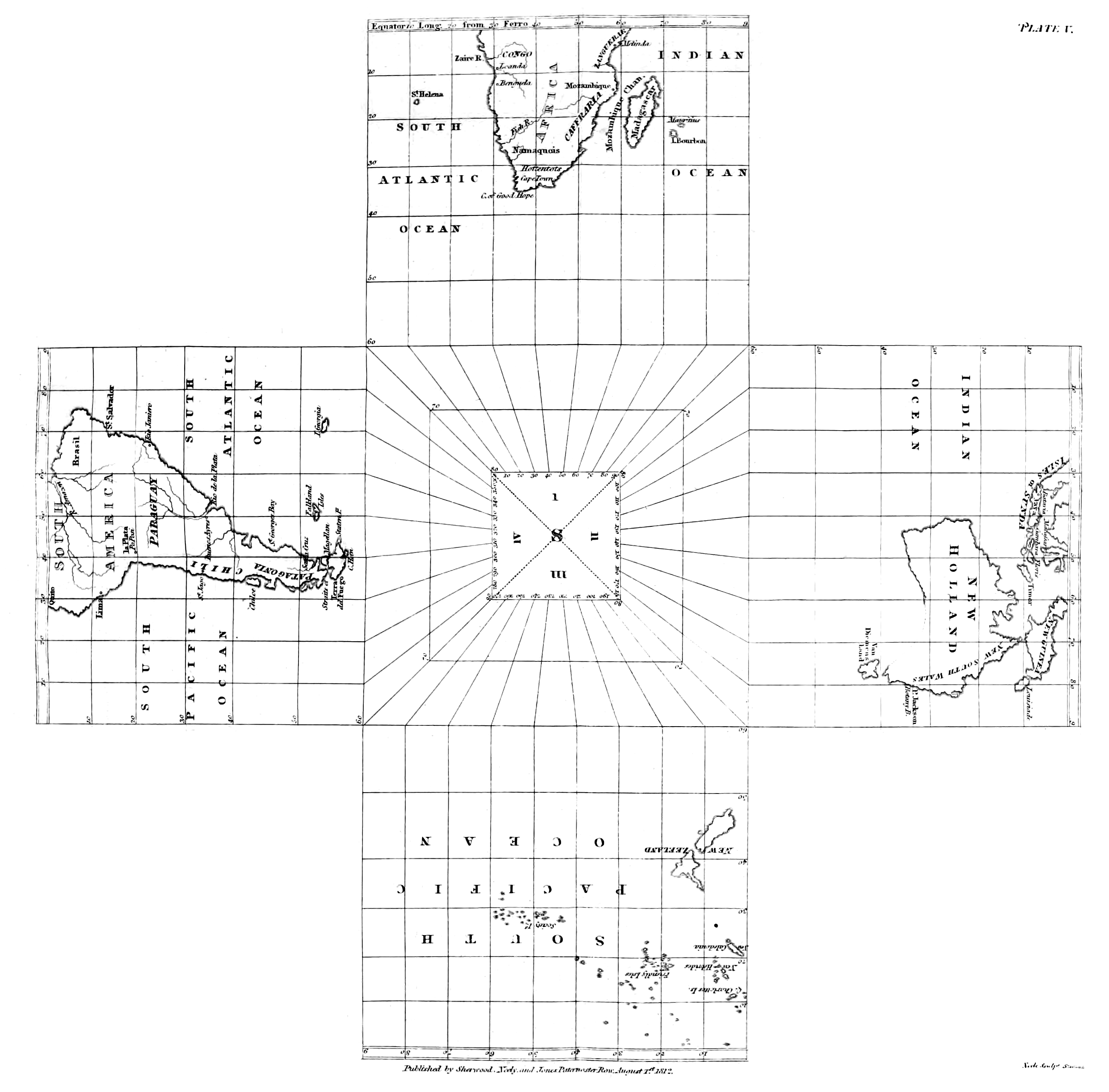

== In popular culture ==
Gregor von Feinaigle is credited by some as being the inspiration for the word "finagle" meaning "To cheat or swindle; to use crafty, deceitful methods." such as "...shady stockbrokers who finagle their clients out of fortunes."

== Sources ==
- Watson Stewart, John (1830). Watson's, or the Gentleman's and Citizen's Almanack, (as Compiled by the late John Watson Stewart,) For the Year of our Lord 1830 (PDF). Dublin: Stewart and Hopes, Stationers, No 3, King's-Inns-Quay, opposite Richmond Bridge.
