= Goat racing =

Popular sport in Tobago

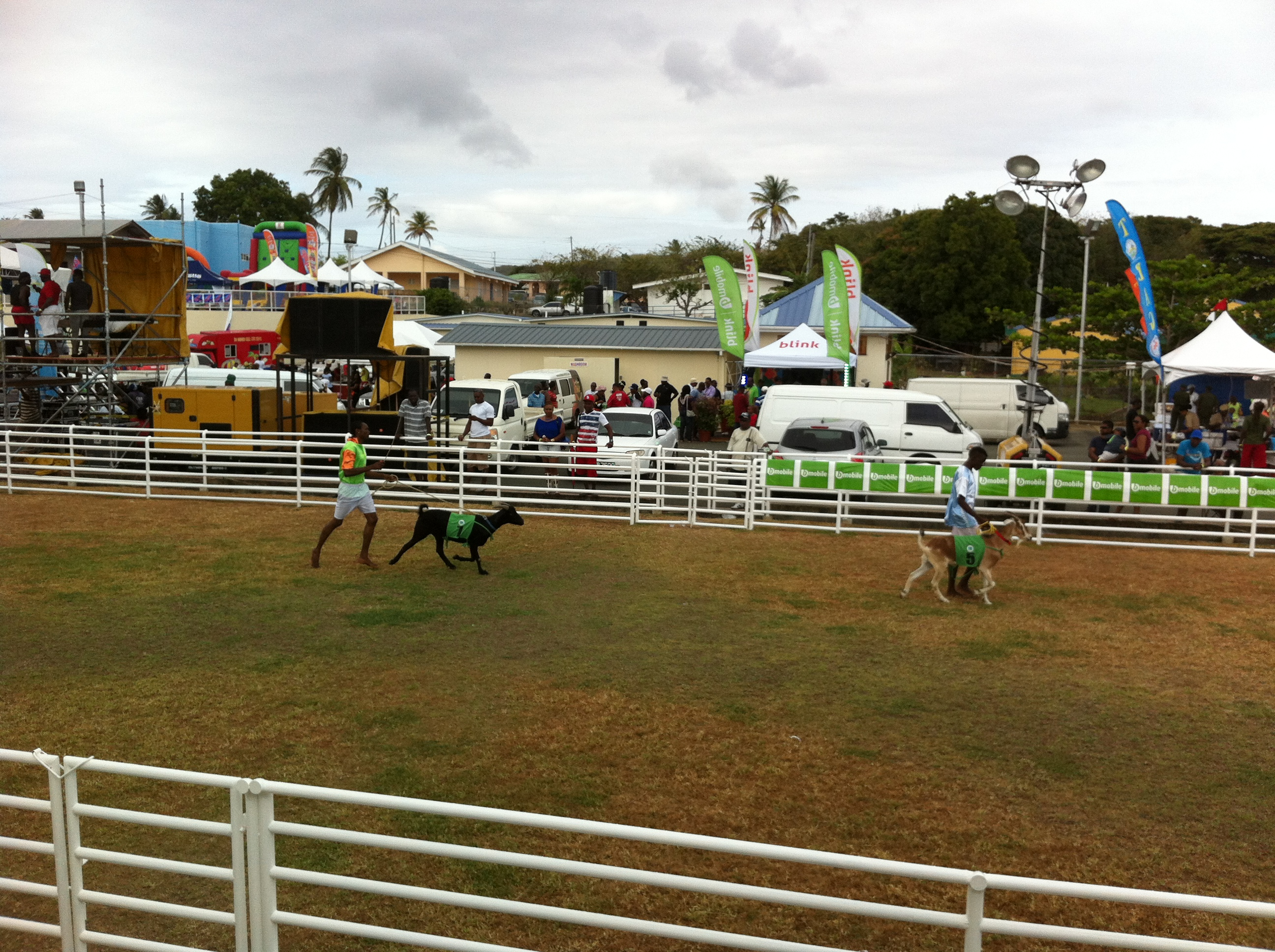
Buccoo Goat Race Festival (2014)

Goat racing is a sport originating in Buccoo, Tobago, which is part of the twin-island republic of Trinidad and Tobago. The sport has been continued in Townsville. Started in 1925 by a Barbadian, Samuel Callendar, goat racing historically occurs on the Tuesday after Easter day, which is known as 'Easter Tuesday' in Trinidad and Tobago and is an unofficial public holiday in Tobago. Today, it is called the Buccoo Goat Race Festival, which is a popular and lively event that draws thousands of spectators, mainly from Trinidad. Also part of the festival is the less popular crab racing. In crab racing, large blue crabs and their jockeys are placed in the centre of a large circle drawn in the sand and coaxed towards the circle's perimeter by their jockeys through a bamboo pole with a string attached to the crab. The first crab to breach the circle is the winner. The Buccoo Goat Race Festival is Tobago's most internationally acclaimed festival.

== History ==
Buccoo, a small seaside village on the southwest coast of Tobago, has hosted goat racing. In the early twentieth century, since horse racing was reserved for the local elite, goat racing developed as a poor man's equivalent. With horse racing traditionally occurring on Easter Monday (the Monday after Easter), Easter Tuesday (the day after Easter Monday) was chosen to run goat races by the Buccoo Goat Race Festival Committee, a sub-committee of the Buccoo Village Council, which organises the goat race annually. Like race horses, the goats are all named.

Initially, goat races were held on Chance Street but were relocated twice when Chance Street was paved. The first relocation was to the Battery, which was unpopular because overhanging cliffs were near the finish line. The second and current relocation is the Buccoo Integrated Facility, which is a $100 million goat race arena that includes stables.

== Around the world ==
Although Tobago is known as the goat racing capital of the world and has the earliest and longest running goat race, goat racing now occurs worldwide.

=== Uganda ===
The Royal Ascot Goat Race in Kampala, Uganda, began in 1993. The idea evolved from a pig race in Zimbabwe. The pig race was held in the garden of a local horse breeder (in Zimbabwe) to celebrate his birthday because he did not have enough space for a horse race. When Entebbe Sailing Club in Uganda considered fundraising ideas, they adopted the idea of a pig race but substituted goats instead. It first started out on the grounds of the Kampala Rugby Club, with 400 people in attendance. By 1998, it outgrew this facility and was moved to the Speke Resort, Munyonyo, in 1999 because it is the only location large enough to host the goat races, which grossed USh 10 million and attracted over 7,000 people in 2005. Along with size, the goat race also grew in scale. It quickly evolved into a whole day event modeled on the Royal Ascot horse races in Ascot, Berkshire, England. Unlike in Tobago, goats are not trained for speed or endurance; instead, goat handlers push a padded vertical barrier behind the goats to keep the goats moving sideways during the race. However, there still is prize money of more than USh 30 million awarded to the winning goat's owners.

Similar to the Royal Ascot horse races, there is as much emphasis on dress, in particular unusual hats. At the Royal Ascot Goat Race, prizes are awarded to the best dressed couple, man, woman, and child, as well as to the person wearing the most extravagant hat, and best goat name. Spectators can also bet on goats. Through a preliminary parade around the track and a betters' guide that describes each goat, spectators can gauge possible winners. Proceeds from betting go to local charities. Along with goat races, there are hospitality and food tents as well as children's amusements.

=== Tanzania ===
Following Uganda's lead, Tanzania introduced the Dar es Salaam Charity Goat Races in 2001 to raise money for local charities. Since its inception, the goat races have raised more than TSh 600 million. Dar es Salaam Charity Goat Races are similar in structure to the Royal Ascot Goat Race with jockeys holding a padded horizontal barrier behind the goats to ensure that the goats stay on track. Another similarity that Tanzania's goat race has with Uganda's is the competitions for spectators: there are best dressed couple and group, children's fancy dress, most colourful and creative hat, and best goat name.

=== United Kingdom ===
On Saturday, April 11, 2015, the 7th annual Oxford and Cambridge Goat Race took place. The race is between two goats named after the prestigious universities and is run at Spitalfields City Farm in East London. The 2016 race took place on Sunday March 27. All proceeds from the race go to Spitalfields City Farm, a registered charity, to cover the year's food bills for the farm animals. On the day, there are stalls selling food and craft items. The two goats that participate in the race run along their daily route, which leads from an exercise paddock to their stables. The goats walk or run at their own speed, although a bucket of food leads them. The goats are also outfitted in lightweight coats in the Oxford and Cambridge colours.

=== United States ===
==== Falmouth, Pennsylvania ====
In Falmouth, Pennsylvania, there is an annual Running of the Goats, which has been held since 1978. The Falmouth goat race is organized by the Falmouth Civic Association and it includes a craft fair as well as food stands.

==== Phoenixville, Pennsylvania ====
Phoenixville, Pennsylvania, runs an annual Sly Fox Bock Festival & Goat Race at the Sly Fox Brewhouse & Eatery in Pikeland Village Square on the first Sunday in May. The Sly Fox Brewhouse & Eatery is owned and run by the local Sly Fox Brewery. The event has evolved into multiple races where the final race matches the day's winners. The winning goat has a Maibock named after it and its owners receive a $75.00 USD gift certificate for the Sly Fox Brewhouse & Eatery. Spectators enjoy German food and music.

== Training ==
The characteristics sought after for a racing goat are strength, endurance, and speed. Animals are trained for at least two months prior to racing when speed and strength are developed. With a rope tied around the goat's neck, a trainer teaches the goat to walk progressively faster until the goat is running just ahead of or beside the trainer. The trainer also incorporates swimming to build the goat's strength and muscle mass. The goat's diet is carefully regulated to ensure peak performance on race day. Goats are trained on the beach or nearby pasture land. Race goats also known as steeds typically have owners, trainers, and jockeys.

=== Jockeys and form ===
Jockeys who run barefoot also train to increase speed and endurance since they must keep up with the speed of the goat. With a rope tied around the goat's neck, the jockey typically runs immediately behind or beside the goat to urge it on. On race day, jockeys and goats run a 100-yard (300 feet) race on a grass field; a goat will be disqualified if it outruns its jockey.

Before races, jockeys warm up through stretching exercises and sprint starts. They might also examine the course for irregularities in the terrain.

=== Sex and lifespan ===
Billy goats (male goats) are preferred to nanny goats (female goats) because they live longer, even though nanny goats are faster runners. A racing goat can live up to 13 years with proper attention to diet and training.

=== Classification ===
The Buccoo Goat Race Festival Committee created a classification system based on experience to categorize goats for races:

- A – most experienced runner
- B – ran for the past two years
- C1 – ran the previous year
- C2 – first-time runner

Based on this classification, a goat is entered into the appropriate race based on its racing experience.

== Race day ==
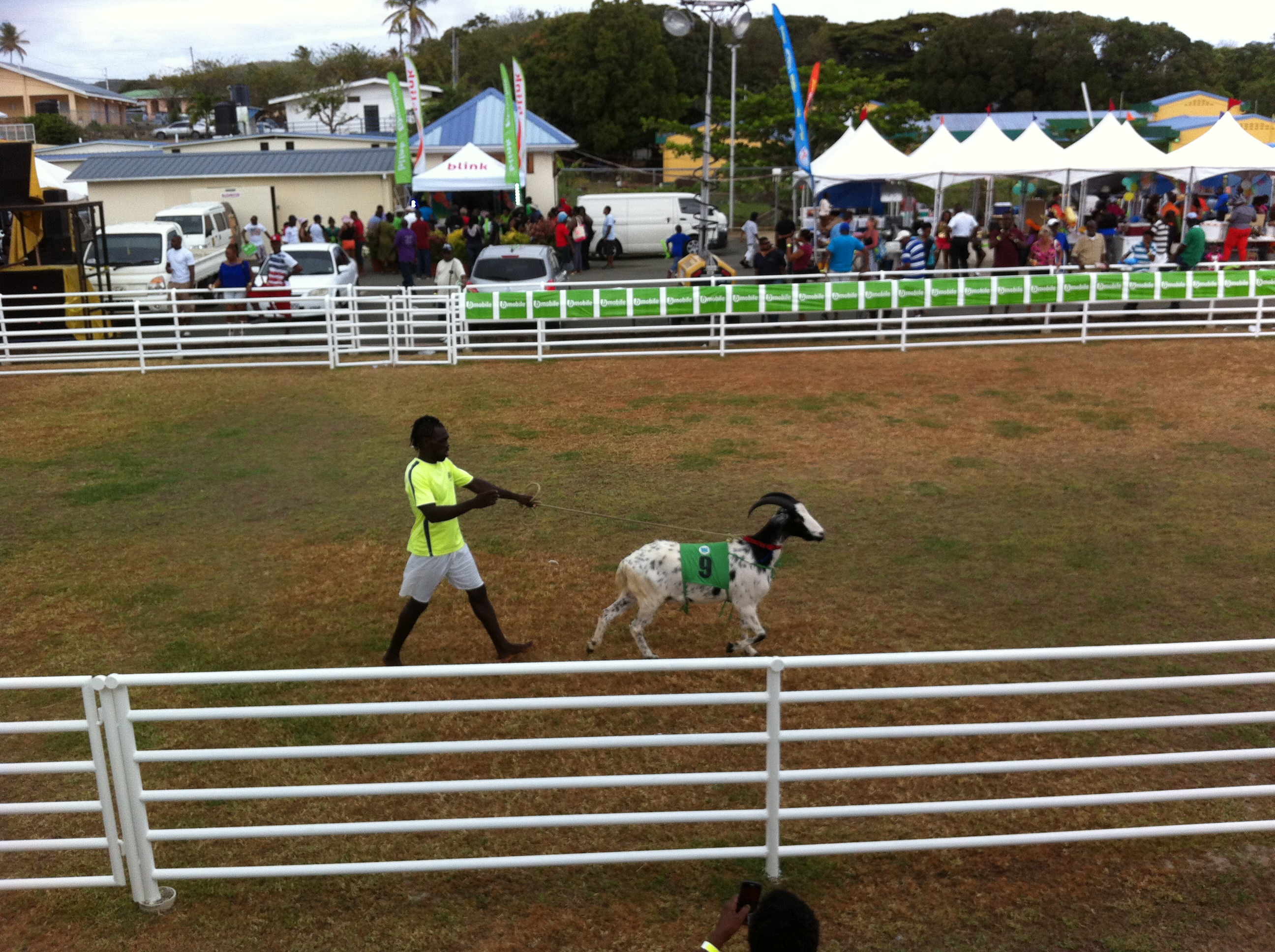
Buccoo Goat Race Festival (2014)

On race day, there is a parade of goats and jockeys through Buccoo village with commentators stating which goats are the favourites to win in their races. This is usually followed by a cultural programme and brief formal ceremony. Goat racing begins after these events. Similar to racing horses, some goats can give trouble in the starting box. Races are sponsored by local companies and accompanied by much shouting as spectators urge their favourites on. Spectators can vote for and bet on their favourite goats. In 2011, the Tobago House of Assembly's Facebook page hosted a "Vote for Your Goat" competition, which included full profiles on the goats including personality, history, and jockeys. Prizes are awarded to winning goats. Interspersed throughout the goat races are more cultural programmes and vendors selling local delicacies, sometimes out of their homes. The day concludes at sundown with a huge street party. The mood is one of celebration.

=== Tourism ===
Buccoo Goat Race Festival is such a big tourism draw for Tobago that it now occurs in two locations: on Easter Tuesday at Buccoo village and on Easter Monday at Mt. Pleasant (a village) that constructed a $10 million TT sporting pavilion to host goat racing and other sporting activities year round. The Tobago House of Assembly's Department of Tourism sponsors the race, which is an annual family event. A race is also run during Tobago Heritage Festival, which is from mid-July to August 1.

==== Development ====
The Tobago House of Assembly (THA) has been criticised in the local Tobago media for not turning a unique festival that lasts a few days and financially benefits some breeders, trainers, and jockeys into a year-round industry that can economically benefit the entire island with the Buccoo Goat Race Festival at its centre. In 2012, THA Chief Secretary Orville London said that the THA plans to introduce a derby in 2013. According to London, the derby will require Buccoo and Mt. Pleasant to host goat races throughout the year where points will be accumulated for the derby.

== See also ==
- Animals in sport
- List of Trinidad and Tobago-related topics
