= St. Ann's Well =

St. Ann's Well or St. Anne's Well may refer to:

- St. Ann's Well Gardens, Hove, a public park in Brighton and Hove, the site of a chalybeate spring
- St. Ann's Well, Buxton in Derbyshire, a hot spring, and a sacred spot
- St Ann's Well railway station, former station in Nottingham. St. Ann's Well, Nottingham is also called Robin Hood's Well.
- St. Anne's or St. Ann's Well, Raheny (both spellings used) in Ireland
- St. Ann's Well, Malvern in Worcestershire, a spring of Malvern water
