= 2026–27 Leinster Senior Cup =

Association football tournament in Ireland

2026-27 Leinster Senior Cup
Leinster Football Association Senior Cup

Tournament details
- Country: Republic of Ireland
- Dates: 29 August 2026 – TBC

The 2027 PTSB Leinster Senior Cup is the 123rd edition of the Leinster Football Association's primary competition. It includes Leinster based League of Ireland clubs from the Premier Division and First Division, as well as a selection of intermediate and amateur level sides.

League of Ireland clubs enter the competition at the group stage in Round 3.

== Round 1 ==
29 August 2026 Round 1	St Anthony's Kilcoole	2–3	Harding	Kilcoole, County Wicklow
15:00				Stadium: Finn Park

30 August 2026 Round 1	Willow Park	1–4	Evergreen	Athlone, County Westmeath
14:00	Ryan Gaffey 70' (pen.)		Xoliswa Stafford 8'; Ethan Phelan 51'; Xoliswa Stafford 81'; Xoliswa Stafford 89'	Stadium: Willow Park

4 September 2026 Round 1	New Oak	0–3	Ratoath Harps	Carlow, County Carlow
10:00				Stadium: Old Burrin

5 September 2026 Round 1	Killester Donnycarney	4–4 (4–1 p)	Duleek	Killester, Dublin 5
14:00	Anthony Flood 8'; Lee Doody 23'; Adam McCormac 47'; Anthony Flood 49'		Cormac McGroggan 5'; Mathew Noone 14'; Kyle Carroll 28'; Cormac McGroggan 66'	Stadium: Hadden Park; Referee: John Hynes

9 September 2026 Round 1	Howth Celtic	2–2 (4–3 p)	Tallaght United	Clonshaugh, Dublin 9
19:00	Gareth McCaffrey 44'; Gareth McCaffrey 85'		Ryan Williams 69'; Dylan Boxwell 90'	Stadium: AUL Complex; Referee: Paul Shelley
	Penalties
	Gareth McCaffrey (penalty scored); Daniel Harkin (penalty scored); Sean Kenny (penalty missed); Josh O'Sullivan (penalty scored); Luke Byrne (penalty scored)		Peter Wall Boggans (penalty scored); Dylan Boxwell (penalty scored); Aaron McGrath (penalty scored); Robert Baxter (penalty missed); Clayton Harte (penalty missed)

13 September 2026 Round 1	Gorey Rangers	3–0	Clonmullion	Gorey, County Wexford
14:00				Stadium: Ramstown; Referee: Paul Kirwan

== Round 2 ==
26 September 2026 Round 2	Harding	1–2	Howth Celtic	Ringsend, Dublin 4
15:00	Irakli Penderava 10'		Gareth McCaffrey 5'; Gary Homan 85'	Stadium: Ringsend Astro; Referee: Karl Nolan

27 September 2026 Round 2	Evergreen	1–1 (a.e.t.) (4–5 p)	Malahide United	Kilkenny, County Kilkenny
14:00	Mikey Drennan 67' (pen.); Mikey Drennan (penalty missed) 75'		Ryan Kearney 30'	Stadium: Evergreen Park; Referee: Jason Moore

2 October 2026 Round 2	Ratoath Harps	2–1 (a.e.t.)	Gorey Rangers	Ratoath, County Meath
19:30	Antonio Cobzaru 21'; Glenn Mulvey 116'		Paul Brennan 59'	Stadium: CHC Park; Referee: David Gallagher

9 October 2026 Round 2	Raheny United	2–1	Killester Donnycarney	Raheny, Dublin 5
20:00	Samuel Burgess 66'; Samuel Burgess 90+3'		Michael McCabe 28' (pen.); Michael McCabe (yellow card) 57' (yellow-red card); Gareth Malone (yellow card) 89' (yellow-red card)	Stadium: Saint Anne's Park; Referee: Daragh Donovan

13 October 2026 Round 2	Blackrock College	2–3	Montpelier	Blackrock, Dublin 4
19:45	Jay Walsh 32'; Anthony Hanney 61' (o.g.); Brian Horgan 67'		Gary Gannon 24'; Gary Gannon 64'; Lee Franzoni 69'	Stadium: New Road Stradbrook; Referee: David Dunne

== Round 3 Group Stage ==
=== Group A ===
Team	Pld	W	D	L	GF	GA	GD	Pts
Bray Wanderers	0	0	0	0	0	0	0	0
Dundalk	0	0	0	0	0	0	0	0
Raheny United	0	0	0	0	0	0	0	0
Malahide United	0	0	0	0	0	0	0	0

==== Matchday 1 ====
By 11 January 2026	Bray Wanderers	v	Malahide United	Bray, County Wicklow
				Stadium: Carlisle Grounds

By 11 January 2026	Dundalk	v	Raheny United	Dundalk, County Louth
				Stadium: Oriel Park

==== Matchday 2 ====
By 18 January 2026	Raheny United	v	Bray Wanderers	Raheny, Dublin 5
				Stadium: Saint Anne's Park

By 18 January 2026	Malahide United	v	Dundalk	Malahide, County Dublin
				Stadium: Gannon Park

==== Matchday 3 ====
By 25 January 2026	Raheny United	v	Malahide United	Raheny, Dublin 5
				Stadium: Saint Anne's Park

By 25 January 2026	Bray Wanderers	v	Dundalk	Bray, County Wicklow
				Stadium: Carlisle Grounds

=== Group B ===
Team	Pld	W	D	L	GF	GA	GD	Pts
Drogheda United	0	0	0	0	0	0	0	0
Ratoath Harps	0	0	0	0	0	0	0	0
St Patrick's Athletic	0	0	0	0	0	0	0	0
UCD	0	0	0	0	0	0	0	0

==== Matchday 1 ====
By 11 January 2026	St Patrick's Athletic	v	UCD	Inchicore, Dublin 8
				Stadium: Richmond Park

By 11 January 2026	Drogheda United	v	Ratoath Harps	Drogheda, County Louth
				Stadium: Sullivan & Lambe Park

==== Matchday 2 ====
By 18 January 2026	Ratoath Harps	v	St Patrick's Athletic	Ratoath, County Meath
				Stadium: CHC Park

By 18 January 2026	UCD	v	Drogheda United	Belfield, Dublin 4
				Stadium: UCD Bowl

==== Matchday 3 ====
By 25 January 2026	Ratoath Harps	v	UCD	Ratoath, County Meath
				Stadium: CHC Park

By 25 January 2026	St Patrick's Athletic	v	Drogheda United	Inchicore, Dublin 8
				Stadium: Richmond Park

=== Group C ===
Team	Pld	W	D	L	GF	GA	GD	Pts
Athlone Town	0	0	0	0	0	0	0	0
Howth Celtic	0	0	0	0	0	0	0	0
Shamrock Rovers	0	0	0	0	0	0	0	0
Wexford	0	0	0	0	0	0	0	0

==== Matchday 1 ====
By 11 January 2026	Shamrock Rovers	v	Wexford	Kingswood, Dublin 24
				Stadium: Roadstone Academy

By 11 January 2026	Athlone Town	v	Howth Celtic	Athlone, County Westmeath
				Stadium: Athlone Town Stadium

==== Matchday 2 ====
By 18 January 2026	Howth Celtic	v	Shamrock Rovers	Clonshaugh, Dublin 9
				Stadium: AUL Complex

By 18 January 2026	Wexford	v	Athlone Town	Crossabeg, County Wexford
				Stadium: Ferrycarrig Park

==== Matchday 3 ====
By 25 January 2026	Howth Celtic	v	Wexford	Clonshaugh, Dublin 9
				Stadium: AUL Complex

By 25 January 2026	Shamrock Rovers	v	Athlone Town	Kingswood, Dublin 24
				Stadium: Roadstone Academy

=== Group D ===
Team	Pld	W	D	L	GF	GA	GD	Pts
Bohemians	0	0	0	0	0	0	0	0
Longford Town	0	0	0	0	0	0	0	0
Montpelier	0	0	0	0	0	0	0	0
Shelbourne	0	0	0	0	0	0	0	0

==== Matchday 1 ====
By 11 January 2026	Bohemians	v	Longford Town	Phibsborough, Dublin 7
				Stadium: Dalymount Park

By 11 January 2026	Shelbourne	v	Montpelier	Drumcondra, Dublin 9
				Stadium: Tolka Park

==== Matchday 2 ====
By 18 January 2026	Montpelier	v	Bohemians	Grangegorman, Dublin 7
				Stadium: TUD Grangegorman

By 18 January 2026	Longford Town	v	Shelbourne	Mullolagher, County Longford
				Stadium: Bishopsgate

==== Matchday 3 ====
By 25 January 2026	Montpelier	v	Longford Town	Grangegorman, Dublin 7
				Stadium: TUD Grangegorman

By 25 January 2026	Bohemians	v	Shelbourne	Phibsborough, Dublin 7
				Stadium: Dalymount Park
