= Saint Anne's Park =

Large public park with playing fields and follies, Dublin, Ireland

Coordinates: 53.372324°N 6.180929°W

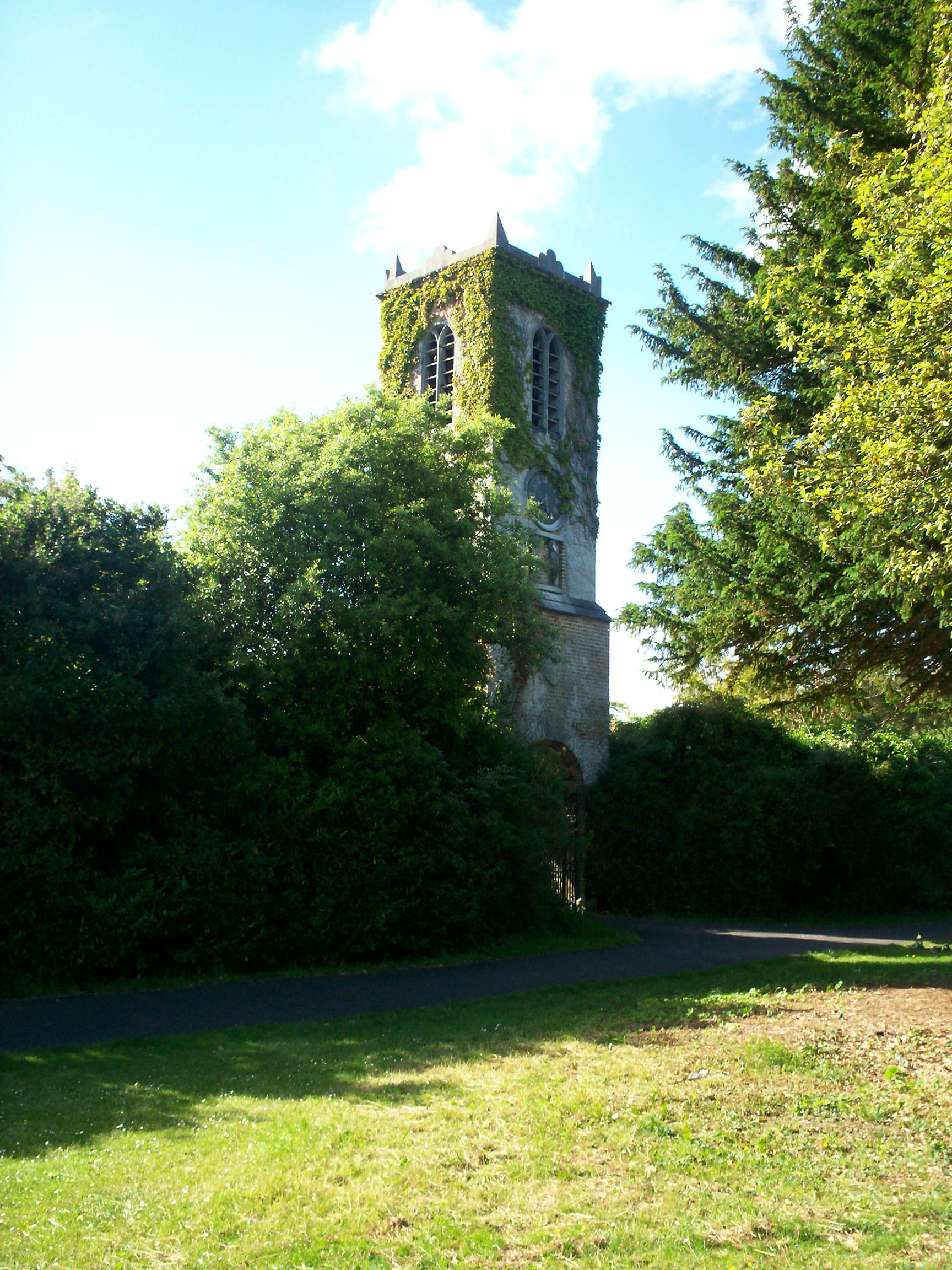
Clocktower at walled garden

Saint Anne's Park (Irish: Páirc Naomh Áine) is a 240-acre (97 ha) public park situated between Raheny and Clontarf, suburbs on the northside of Dublin, Ireland. It is owned and managed by Dublin City Council.

The park, the second largest municipal park in Dublin, is formed from part of a former 202 hectares (500 acres) estate assembled by members of the Guinness family, descendants of Sir Arthur Guinness, founder of the famous brewery, beginning with Benjamin Lee Guinness in 1835 (the largest municipal park is nearby (North) Bull Island, also shared between Clontarf and Raheny). In 1837, they built St Anne's House, a large Italianate-style residence. The house and park were purchased by Dublin Corporation (now Dublin City Council) in 1939. Part of the land was developed for housing.

The park is bisected by the small Naniken River and features an artificial pond and a number of follies, a rose garden, a Chinese garden, a fine collection of trees with walks, including Dublin municipal arboretum, a playground, cafe, and recreational facilities including extensive Gaelic sport and soccer playing fields, tennis courts and a par-3 golf course. There is also a dedicated dog park.

== History ==
=== Before the Guinnesses ===
In 1747, John Vernon of Clontarf Castle leased 29 Irish acres of land at Blackbush to a Paul Hale and his brothers for 99 years, and in 1796, Margaret Holmes, only child of Paul Hale, assigned Blackbush to her son John Holmes. In 1814, 'Thornhill House' was built on the Blackbush lands by Sergeant John Ball. As of 1829, Hugh and Fleming O'Reilly were living in Thornhill.

=== The Guinness era ===
1835, Arthur Lee Guinness and Benjamin Lee Guinness bought, for £500, the lease of Thornhill from the O'Reilly family and the trustees of the Holmes family, and negotiated a new lease with John Vernon; they immediately moved into Thornhill House. Further lands were purchased over time by the Guinness family to build up an extensive property. In 1837, Elizabeth and Benjamin Lee Guinness commissioned St Anne's House, a large Italianate-style residence known locally as "The Mansion", and it was modified over several generations. The Italianate influence included references in the garden follies to ancient Roman sites as well as the import of actual antiquities.

The new estate was named after the Holy Well of the same name, albeit with a slightly different spelling.

In 1868 Elizabeth and Benjamin's son, Sir Arthur Edward Guinness, later Lord Ardilaun, inherited the estate and also purchased an adjacent property, Manresa House. He was the person most responsible for expanding and developing the estate and gardens and planted wind-breaking evergreen oak trees (Quercus ilex) and pines along the main avenue and estate boundaries, where they remain. Lady Ardilaun, originally of Bantry House, County Cork, developed the gardens based on her interest in French chateau gardens, but also with eclectic influences of the Victorian era and the horticultural expertise of her Scottish gardener. Lord Ardilaun was also prominent in the Royal Horticultural Society.

Lord and Lady Ardilaun had no children and the estate passed to their nephew Bishop Benjamin Plunket in the 1920s.

=== Public park, housing and school ===
In 1937, Bishop Plunket decided he could no longer maintain such a large estate and negotiations with Dublin Corporation resulted in the house and 444.75 acres (1.80 km^{2}) of the estate being sold to the corporation for approximately £55,000 in 1939. Bishop Plunkett retained Sybil Hill as a private residence with 30 acres (120,000 m^{2}) of parkland, and it was later sold to the later became the site of St Paul's College, Raheny. In 1952 St. Paul's College acquired an additional 14 acres of Corporation lands, behind their school, to use as school playing fields.

During the Second World War, Dublin Corporation encouraged local residents to grow vegetables in allotment gardens within the estate.

In December 1943, the main residence of St Anne's was gutted by a fire while being used as a store by the Local Defence Force; the ruins were demolished in 1968. In the meantime, just over 200 acres (80.9 ha) of the estate were developed for public housing with the central and most attractive portion comprising about 240 acres (97 ha) retained as parkland and playing fields.

In 2023 a plaque was unveiled by Dublin City Council at the site of the former home of Seosamh Mac Grianna.

== Features ==
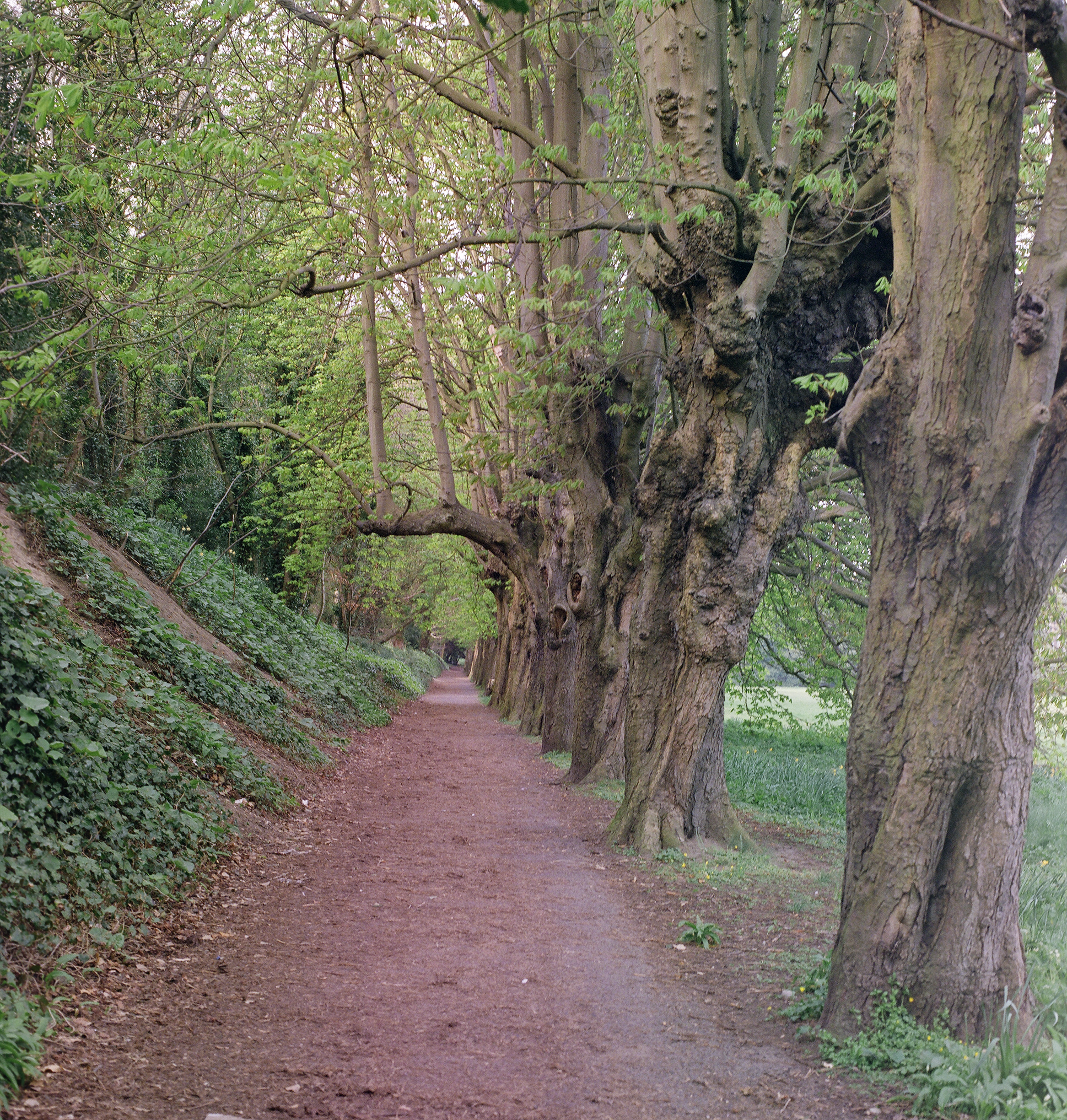
Chestnut walk from rock garden to duck pond

The park has a number of features. It is crossed by the small Naniken River, and a diversion from this, in turn, supplies the artificial Duck Pond. The Guinness family added a number of follies, a walled garden, and a grand avenue to the mansion house. Since the 1950s, extensive walks, a recognised Rose Garden and newer miniature rose garden, and Dublin's city arboretum, the Millennium Arboretum, which was formed with 1,000 varieties of tree, have been added.

Within the last decade, Dublin City Council has been restoring parts of the Naniken River to its natural state, creating wildlife habitats and wildflower meadows, and improving the path system. They removed some 1970s interventions, including a secondary pond and some rockery walks, partly due to problems with maintenance and partly to open up a vista from James Larkin Road. The park management also increased car parking to alleviate traffic congestion in the surrounding neighbourhoods of the popular park.

=== Follies and garden buildings ===
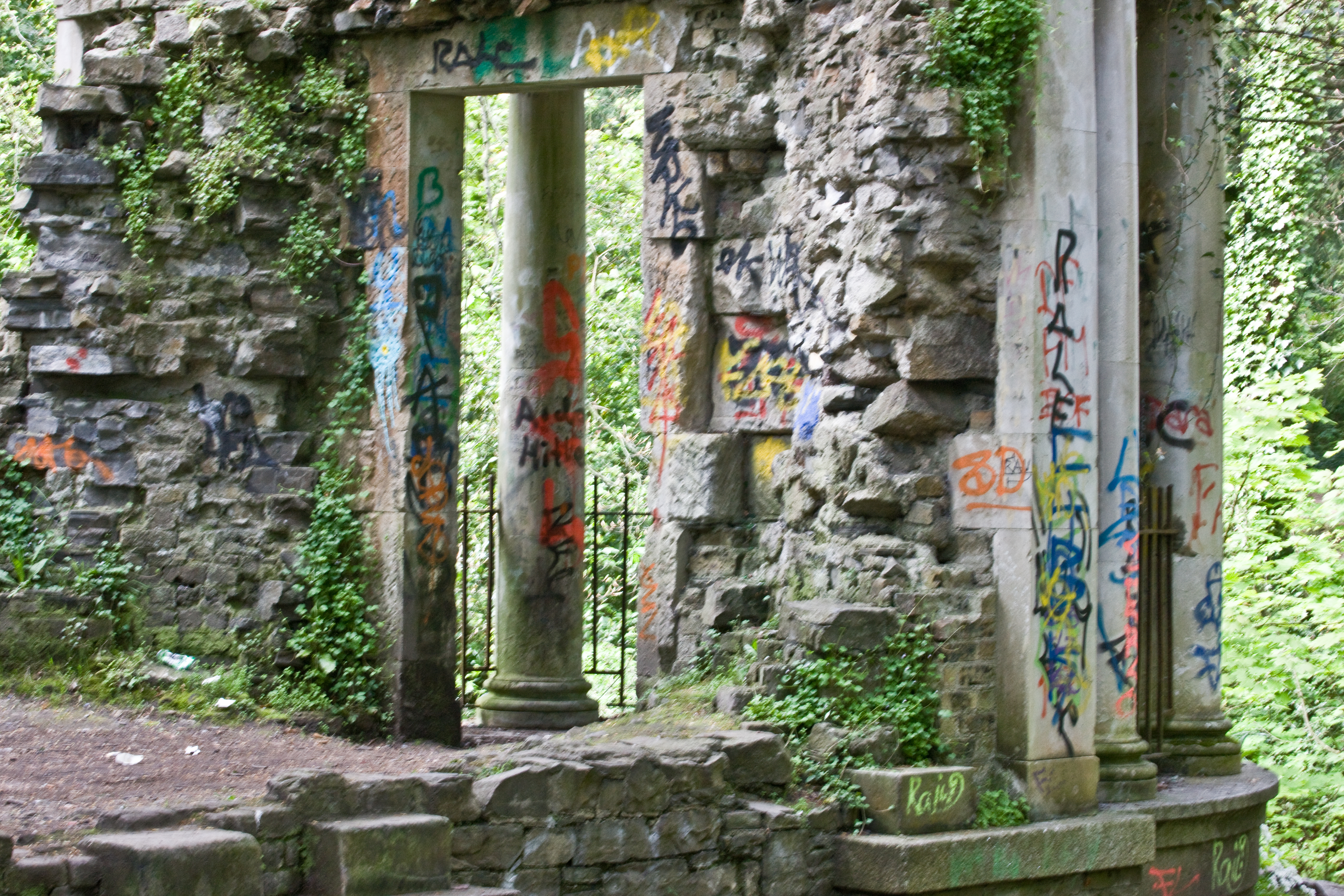
Folly, St. Anne's Park

St. Anne's is known for its garden follies and features, of which there are approximately 10 surviving from around 12, mainly around the Naniken River. These are a holy well covering, three classical buildings, two decorative bridges, a rustic cave, a grotto where several paths meet, a shell house and a yew circle and pool, while lost features include a yew walk and nymphaeum, and a basalt "druidic circle". No details of what the latter consisted of survive, but there are substantial structures in basalt around one crossing of the Naniken. There are numerous features along the Naniken and by the pond.

==== Hermitage bridge ====
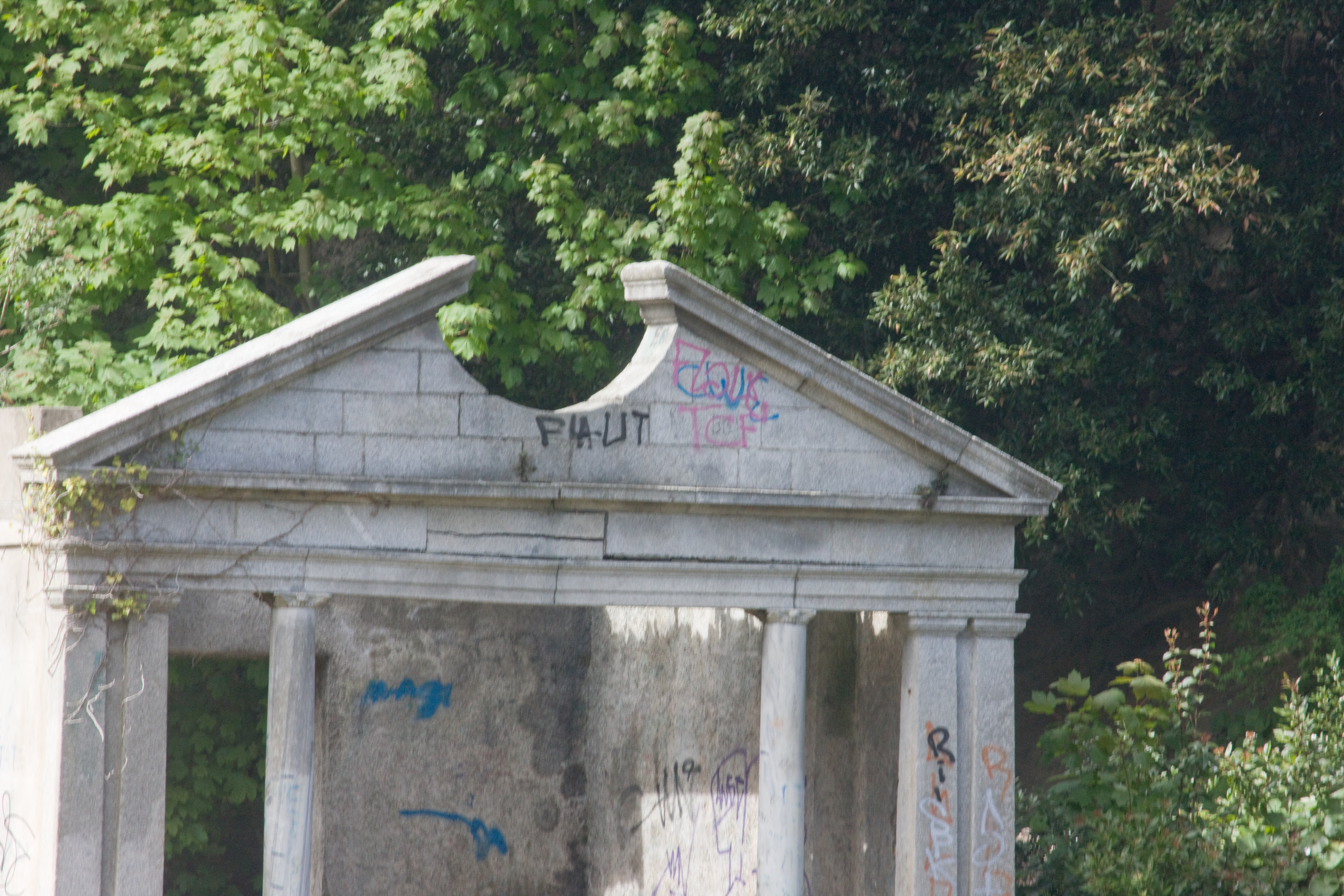
Garden building, St. Anne's Park

The Hermitage Bridge, which crosses the Naniken several metres above, has a passage at river-bank level, and a "hermit's chamber".

==== Herculanean house ====
A composite domus-style house based on findings at Herculaneum was built on a mock-ruined bridge abutment along the little Naniken River near St Anne's House; it served as a tearoom for the family. For a period in the 1970s and 1980s, a bridge crossed the river at this point.

==== Rustic cave ====
As the Naniken approaches the Duck Pond, there is a "rustic cave" to one side.

==== Viewing tower ====
The viewing tower, an unusual folly, is a Roman-style building designed by Sir Benjamin Guinness himself, based on the Roman Tomb of the Julii at St Remi in France, and stands on the hill overlooking the duck pond. This started out as an observation tower on the roof of the original house. Later, the tower was removed during the extensive refurbishment of St. Anne's house in about 1873 and placed in its current location.

The viewing tower is a three-storey structure, with round-headed windows on the lower floor, which is 3.35m. square, segmental pediments over the first-floor windows, and eight Doric columns and arches on the top floor supporting the roof. The structure is 11m high.

==== St Ann's Well ====
The Guinnesses built a stone hood over the well, a site of pilgrimage over centuries. It provided a flow of water to the pond, into the 20th century, but has been dry for many years.

==== Temple of Isis ====
A water temple based on the Pompeian Water Temple of Isis is located on the banks of the duck pond, an artificial lake which was created by diverting some of the flow of the Naniken.

Elsewhere are:

==== Annie Lee Guinness Bridge ====
This ornamental tower bridge, a sham ruin, was the first folly built at St Anne's. The asymmetrical castellated bridge was built over the entrance driveway from the coast road in 1839 to mark the birth of Annie Lee Guinness. It has the form of a tower and bridge near a horse chestnut walk. Queen Victoria passed under the bridge on her visit to the estate in 1900.

==== Shell house ====
One of the oldest garden features, the shell house is formed of a mix of shells and Howth quartz.

==== Yew circle ====
The remains of a yew circle and fountain pool are located behind the former formal walled garden beside the house's site.

==== Rustic archways ====
Three rustic archways and a rockwork feature lie at the meeting of pathways coastwards from the former formal gardens.

==== Restoration and conservation ====
Many of the follies had reached a neglected condition by the 2000s. For example, the Roman-style viewing tower was graffiti-covered, had been closed for many years and became completely hidden by mature trees (it could only be revealed, and the view restored, by felling trees, which would be detrimental to the environment of the park, so an alternative proposal was that the tower be moved instead to the site of the old rockery, near the junction of James Larkin Road and Mount Prospect Avenue).

In 2010, Dublin City Council, with the support of the Heritage Council, commissioned a strategy from conservation architects Shaffrey and Associates for the long-term conservation of the remaining follies, and it was planned to implement this on a phased basis. Restoration works began in 2017. Graffiti remains an ongoing issue.

==== Lost folly and garden features ====
Two garden areas, a pergola garden and a lavender garden, are long lost. There was also a dogs' graveyard. The "Druidic Circle" of Giant's Causeway basalt was lost at an earlier stage. There was also a yew walk and nymphaeum, which ran within the formal gardens once located behind the main house, and is attested in photographs.

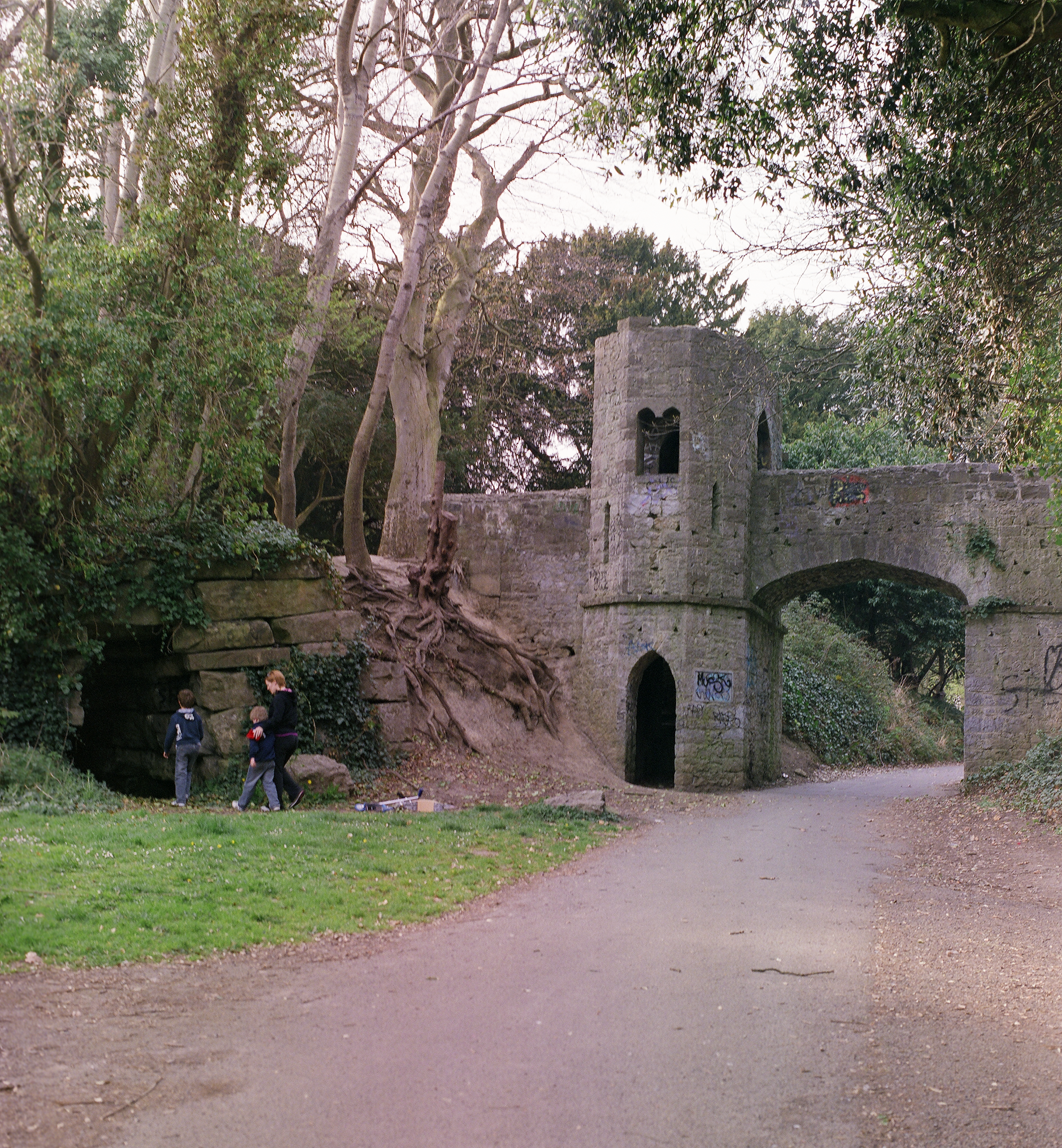
Annie Lee Tower and Bridge Folly near chestnut walk

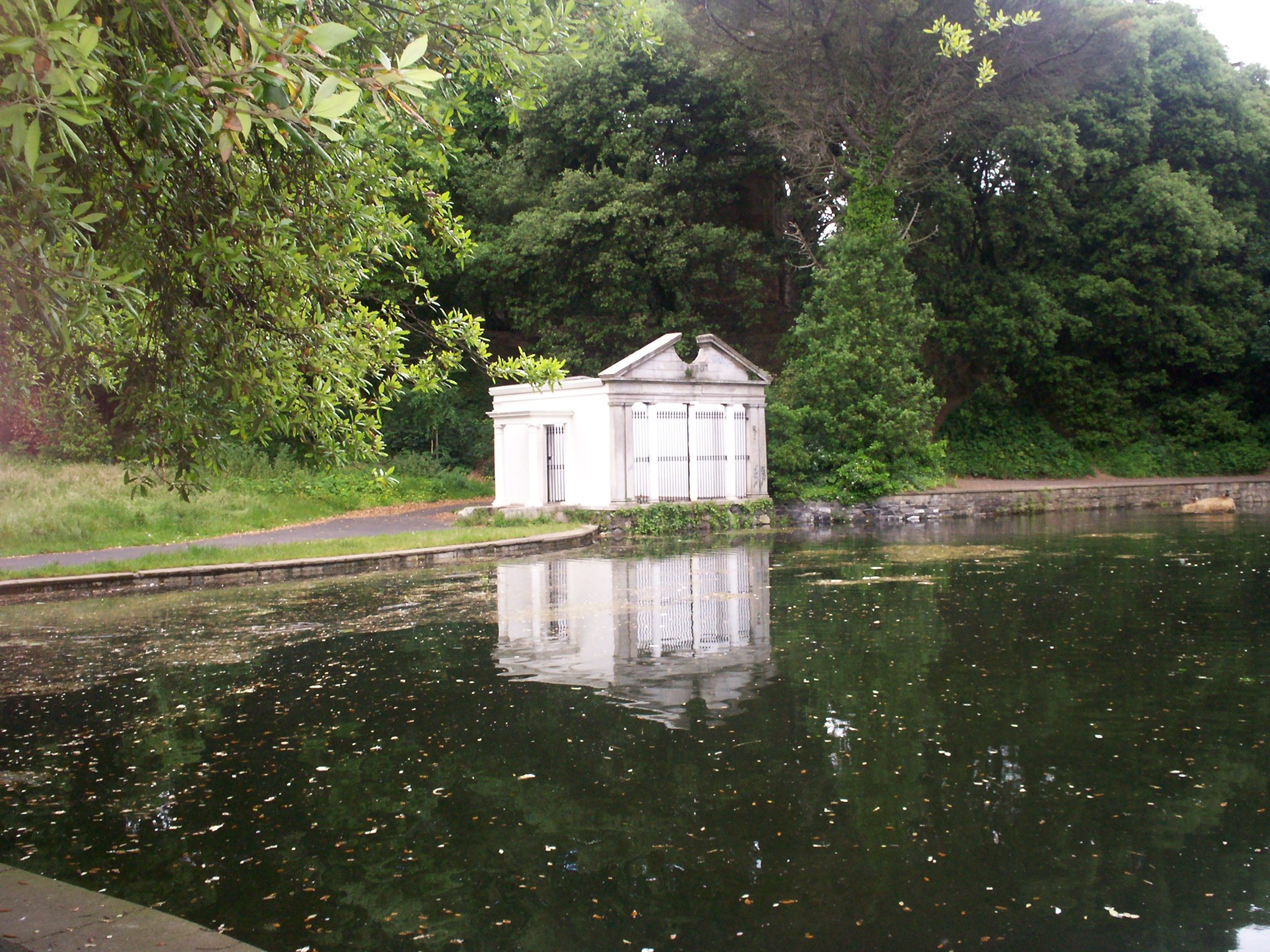
Temple of Isis by the duck pond

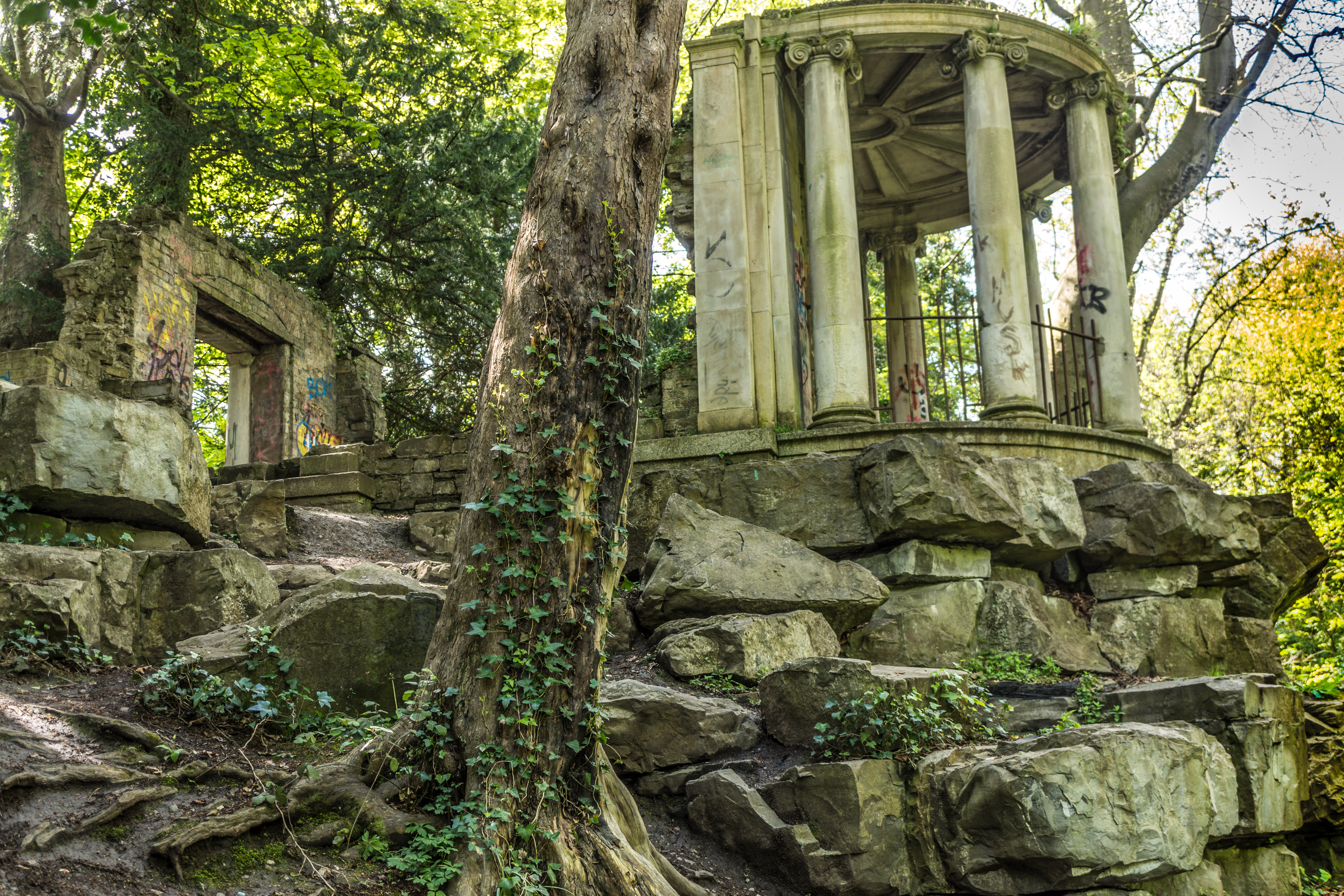
Herculanean temple overlooking the Naniken River

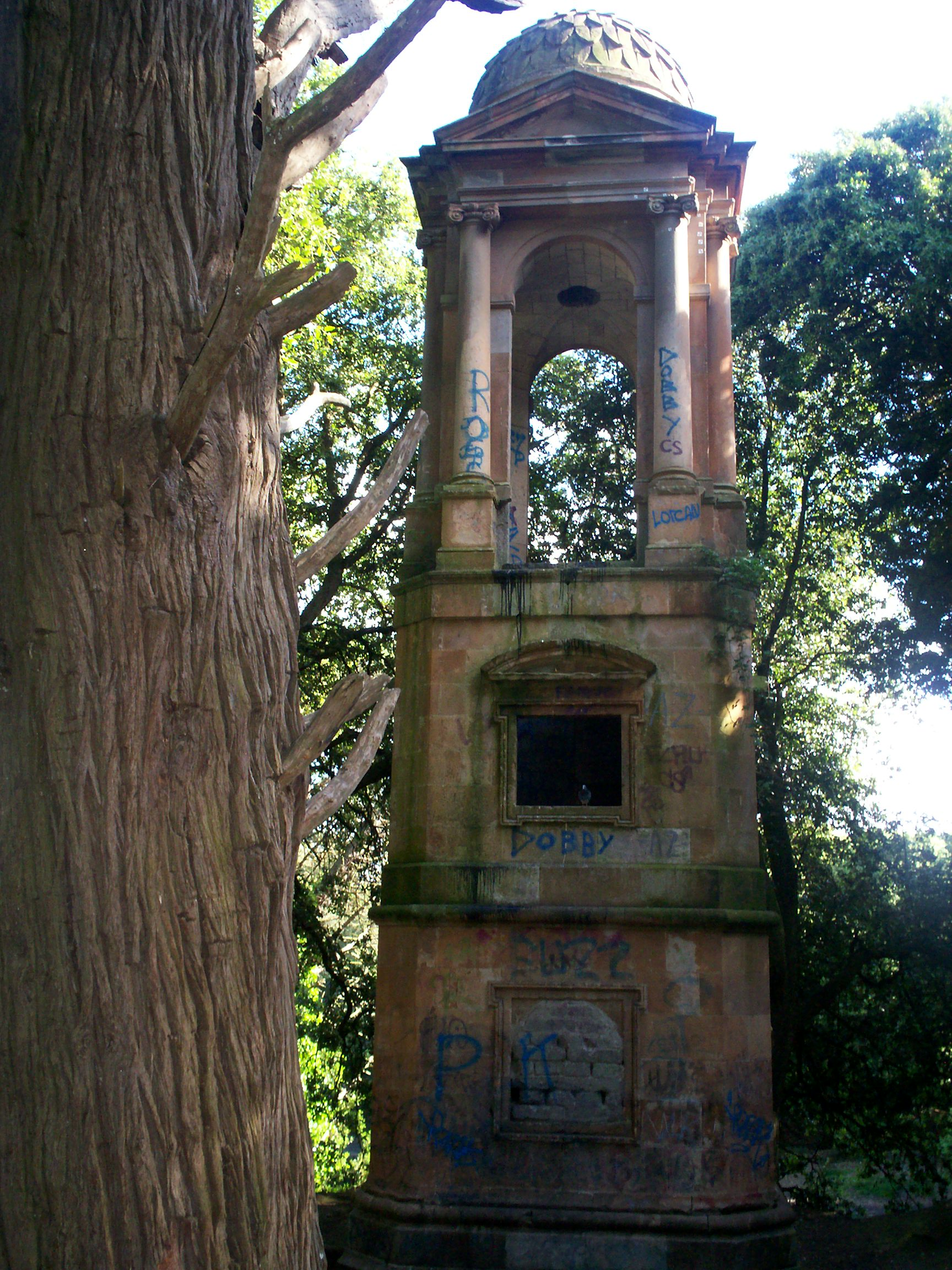
Roman-style tower on the hill above the duck pond

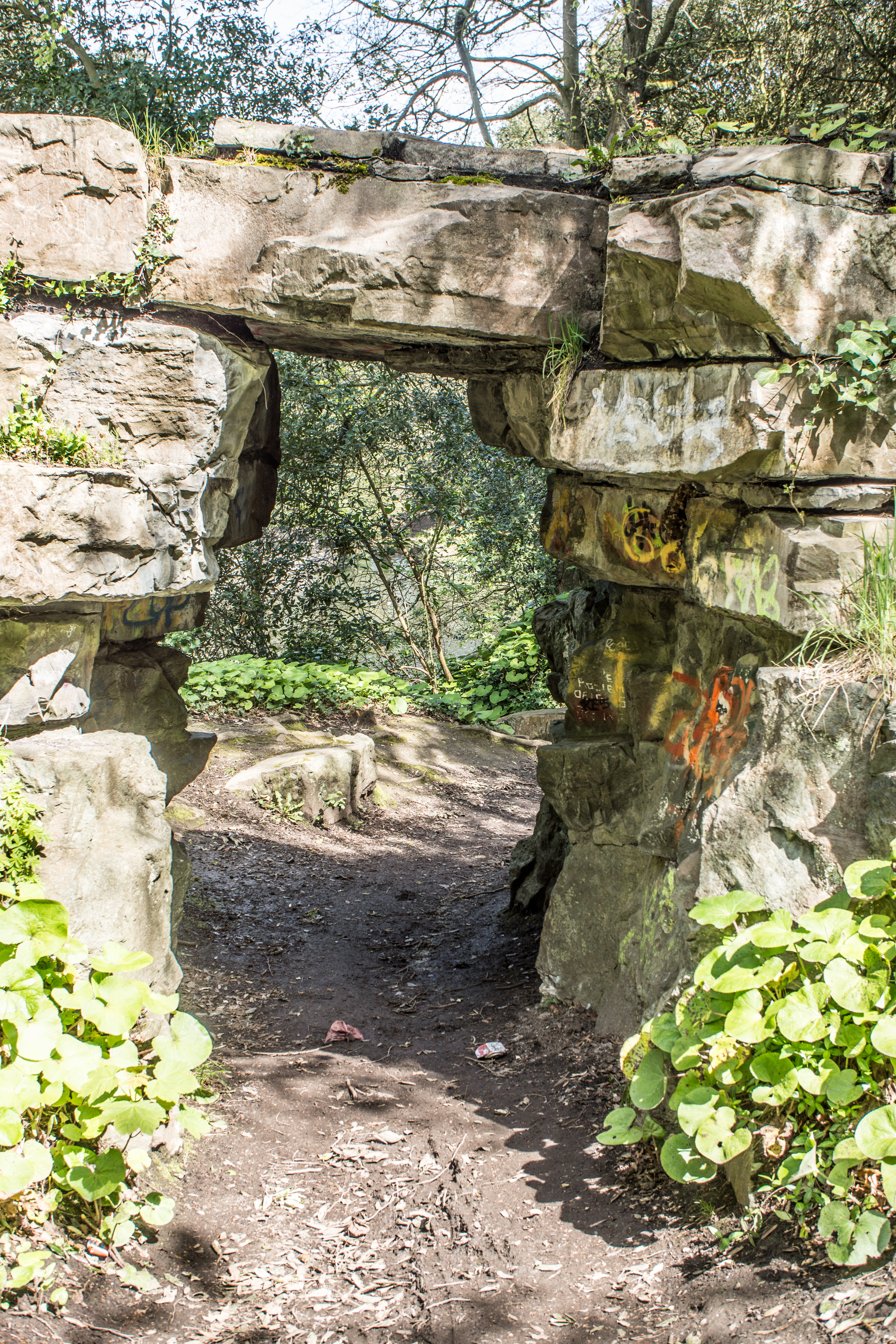
Rustic archway

=== Stables ===
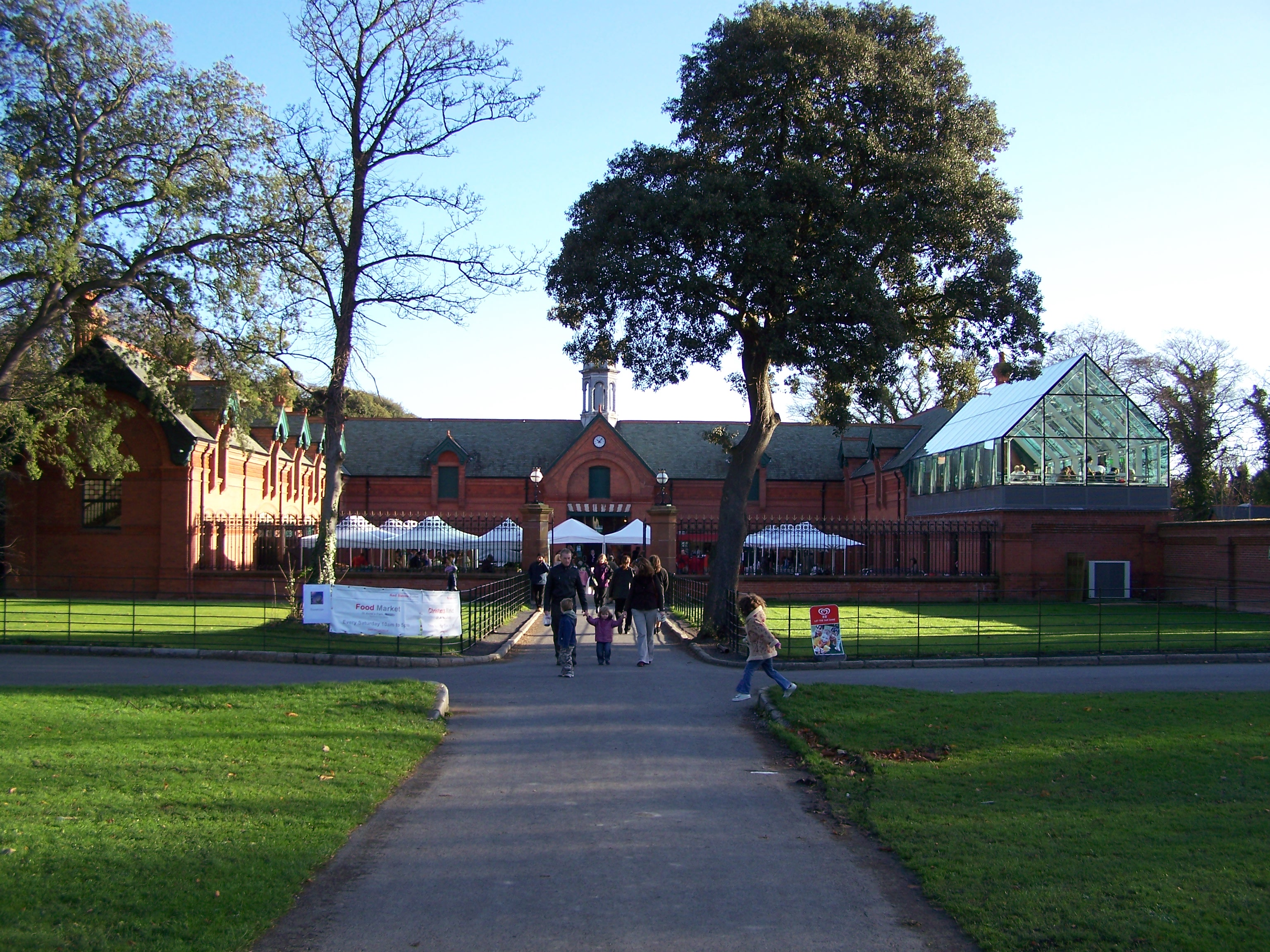
The red stables on market day

The elaborate Tudor red brick Ardilaun stables, lining three sides of a square, were designed by George Coppinger Ashlin, also the architect of All Saints Church at Raheny and built by Collon Brothers for £6,000. The Red Stables as they are called, because they are built using Portmarnock red brick and were renovated in the 1990s by Dublin City Council as the Red Stables Art Centre, with public facilities such as artists' residences upstairs, an exhibition space and a café, Olive's Room. Previous artists-in-residence include Niall de Buitléar, Tadhg McSweeney, and Paul McKinley. A Farmers' Market is held in the courtyard at weekends. This scheme has won international architecture awards.

=== Lodges ===
Sealawn Lodge is located on the coast road and decorated with elaborate gables; in occupation since the 1950s, it was restored in 2017. Bedford Lodge, headquarters of Dublin City's parks and landscape department from 1978 to 1995, is on Mount Prospect Avenue; it is no longer part of the public park. Next door to it is Shellingford Lodge. Another lodge, on the coast road, occupied by Seosamh Mac Grianna for a time, is no longer extant.

=== Gardens ===
==== The Rose Garden ====
In 1975, St Anne's Rose Garden was opened to the public. In 1980 it was given a Civic Award by Bord Failte and the Irish Town Planning Institute, and since 1981 it has been a centre for International Rose Trials. Its development led to the annual Rose Festival, now a popular event on the summer calendar for Dublin gardeners and families every July.

==== Walled garden / former kitchen garden ====
The walled garden, including a fruit garden added to the estate by Bishop Plunkett, now holds a 12 acres (4.9 ha) plant nursery for the Parks Department. Thousands of bedding plants, shrubs, trees, and floral tubs are produced annually in the nursery. There is a herbaceous garden area open during limited hours, and a fine clock tower, restored to working order in 2007. There is also a Physic or Herb Garden, maintained by the Irish Register of Herbalists with the city council, and a miniature rose garden.

A Chinese garden, in the Suzhou style, was built in one corner of the walled garden.

==== Allotments ====
Since 2009, Dublin City Council has provided public allotment gardens (allocated on a lottery basis) to meet demand by city residents for space to grow their own produce.

==== St. Anne's City Farm ====
Alongside the allotments is St. Anne's City Farm, a not-for-profit volunteer-run urban farm that opened in 2019. It had been planned since 2017, and was officially opened by Lord Mayor Nial Ring. It was inspired by urban farms in London including Hackney city farm and Spitalfields city farm. The farm hosts rescued cats, chickens, goats, sheep, donkeys, and a pony.

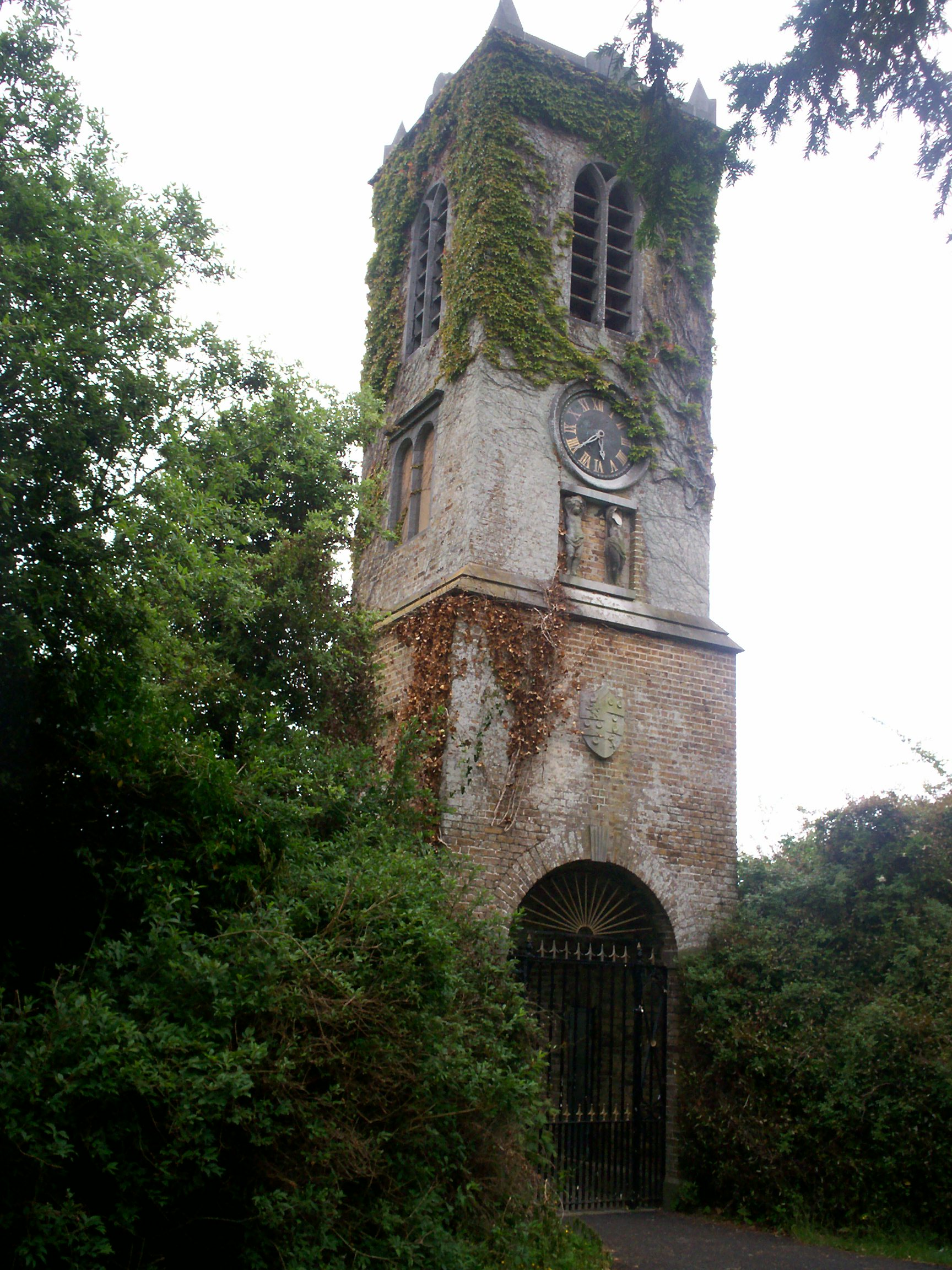
Close up of clocktower at walled garden

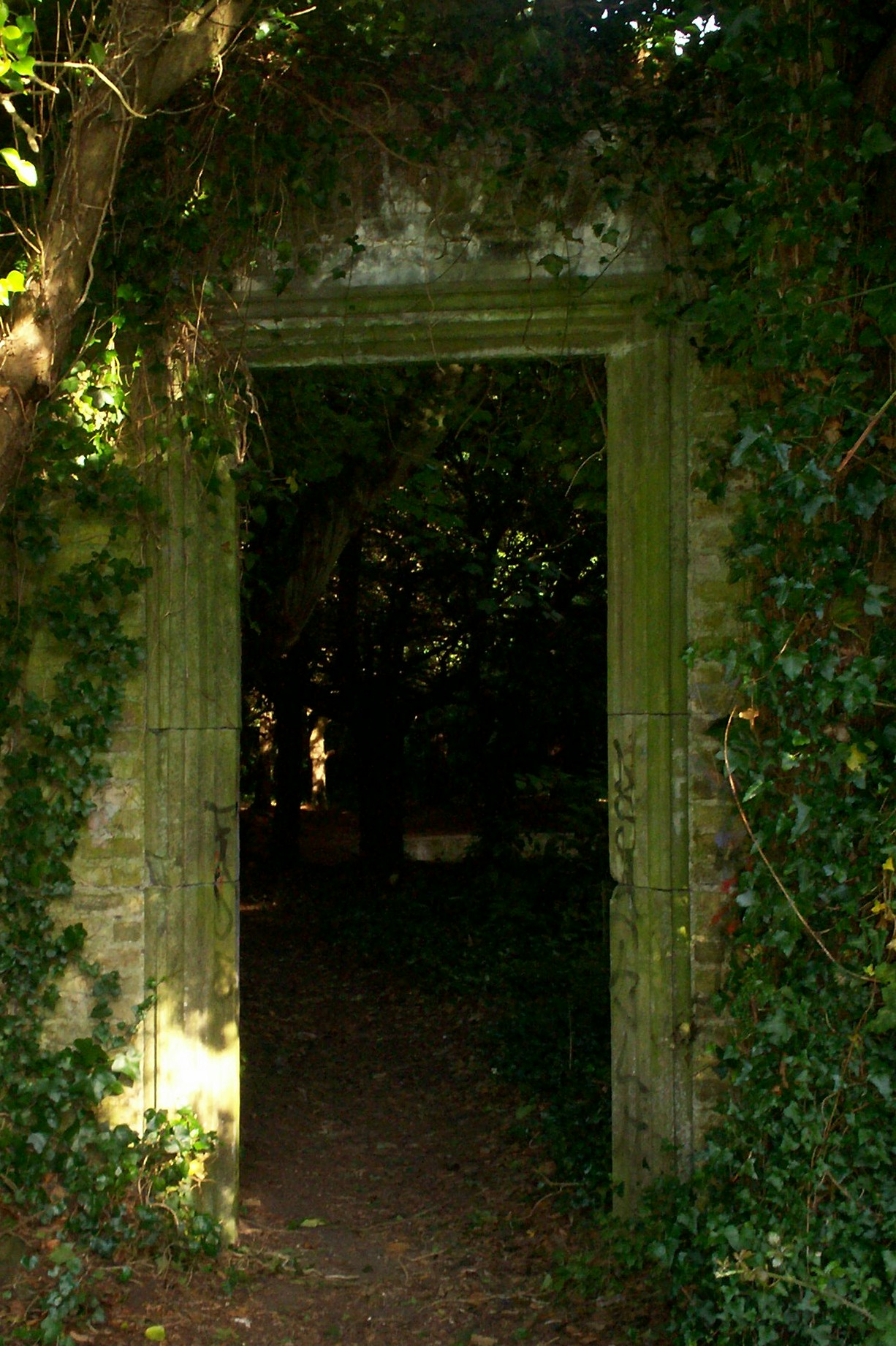
Georgian Doorway at house walled garden

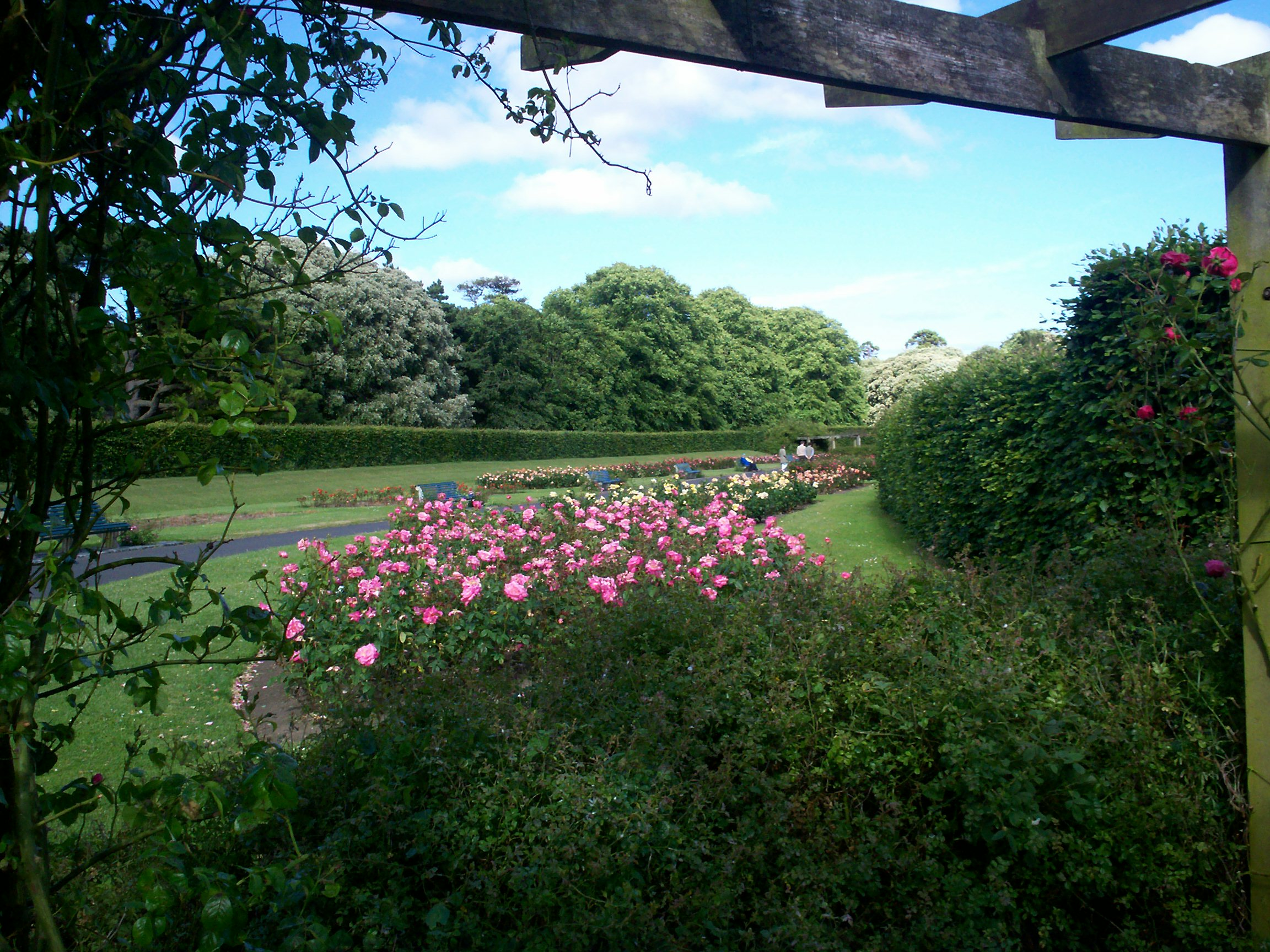
Outer ring of rose garden viewed through a pergola

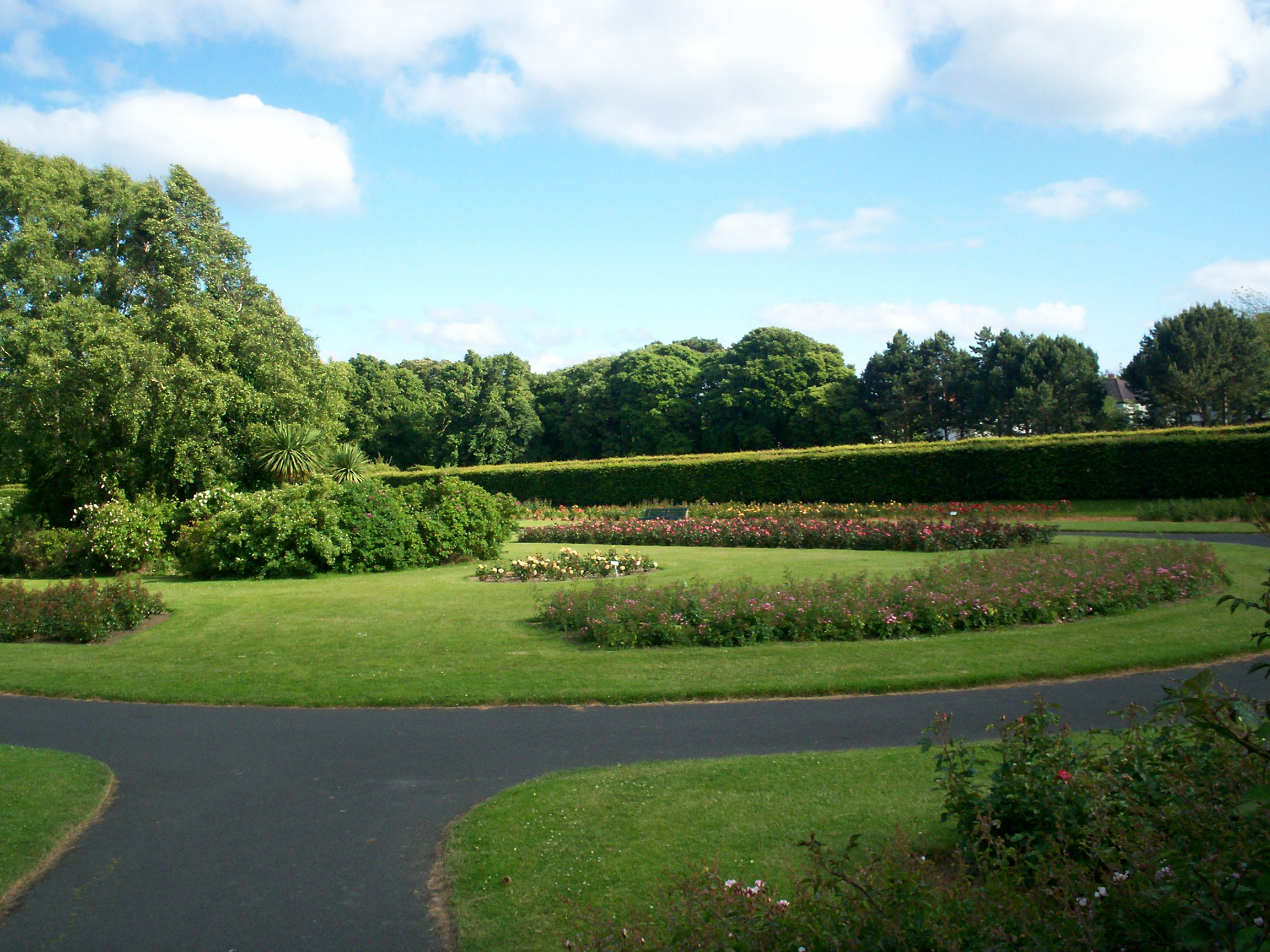
Central area of rose garden

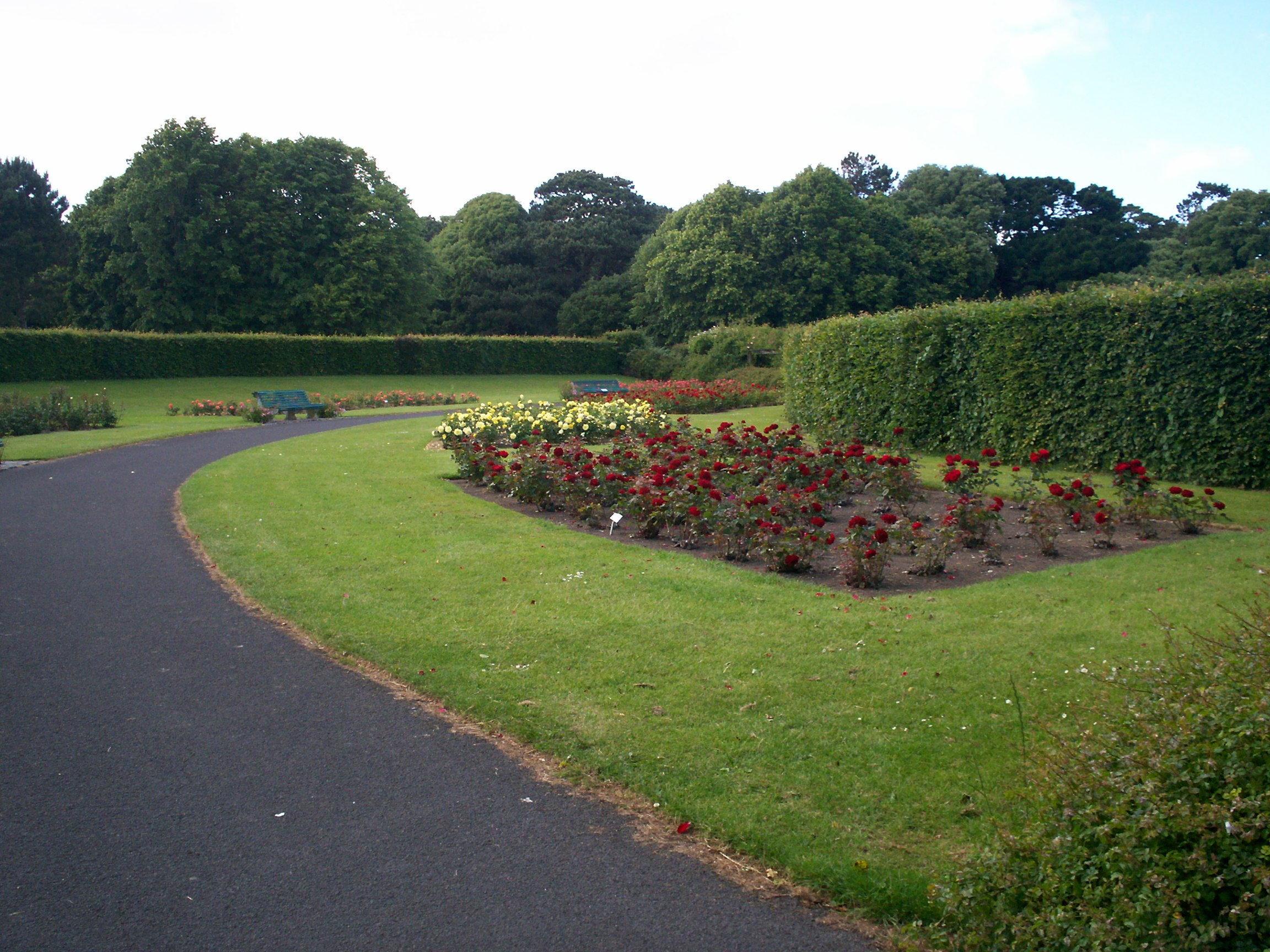
Outer ring of rose garden

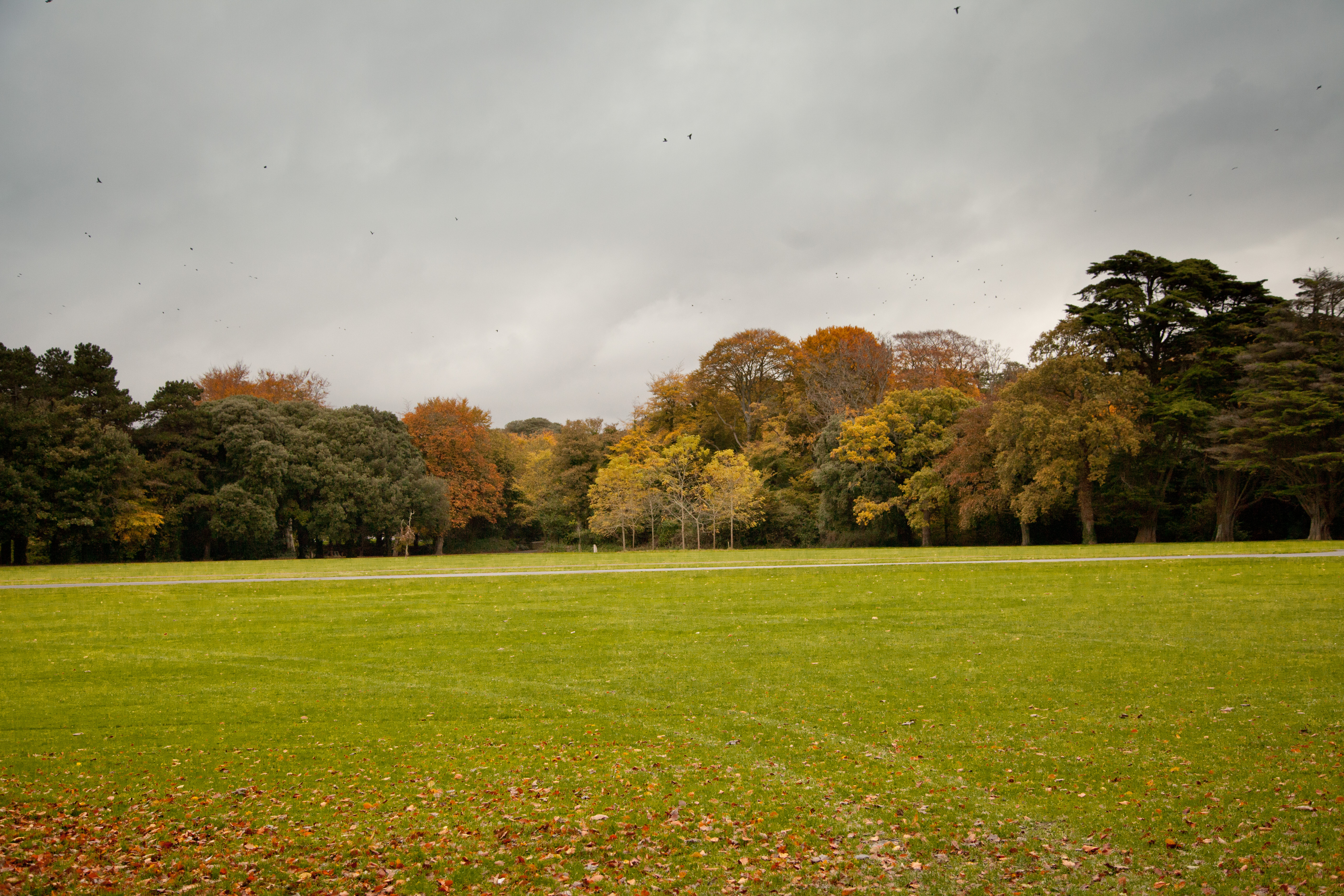
Fields of the park during autumn

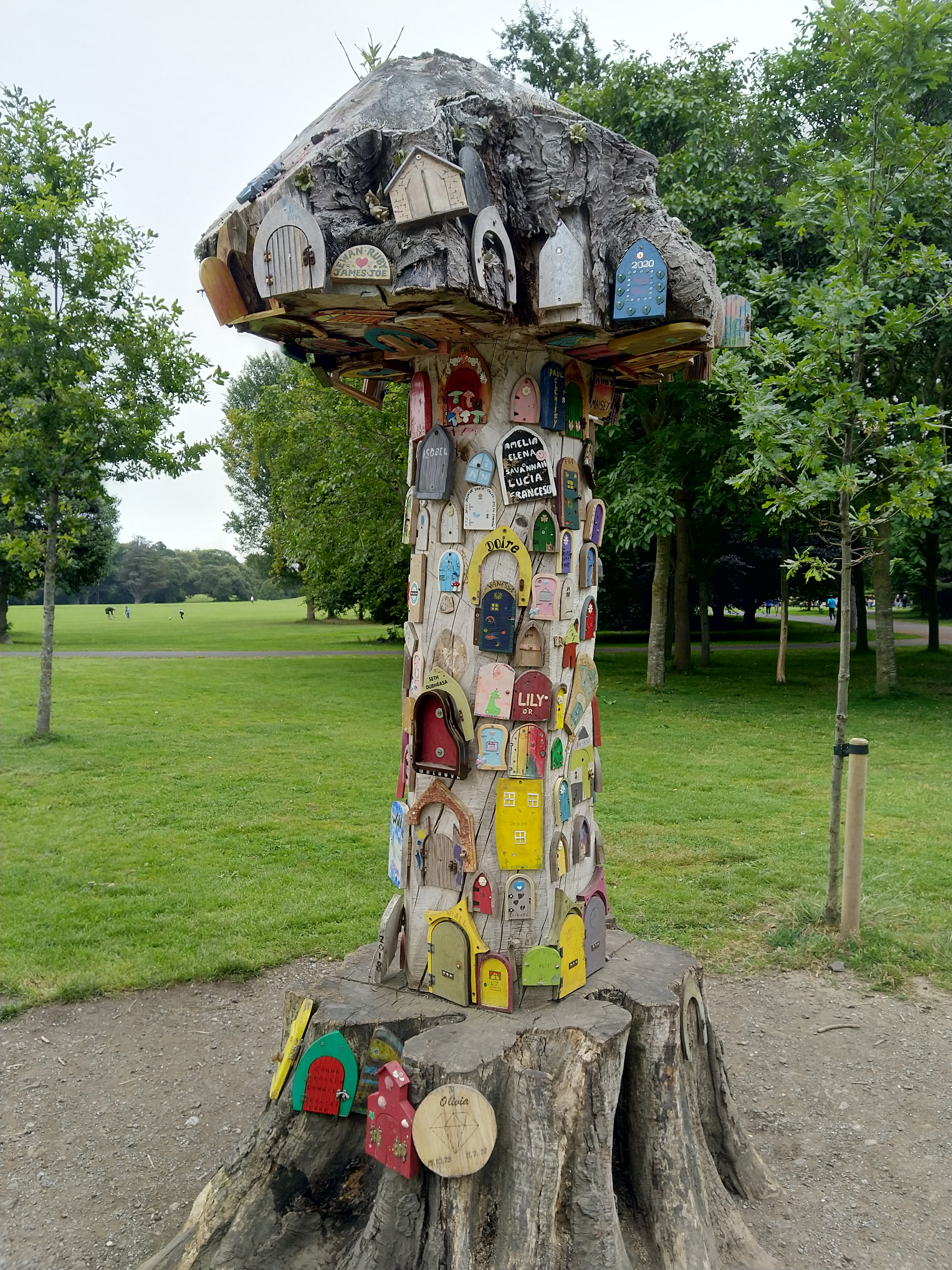
The Fairy Tree featuring numerous fairy doors

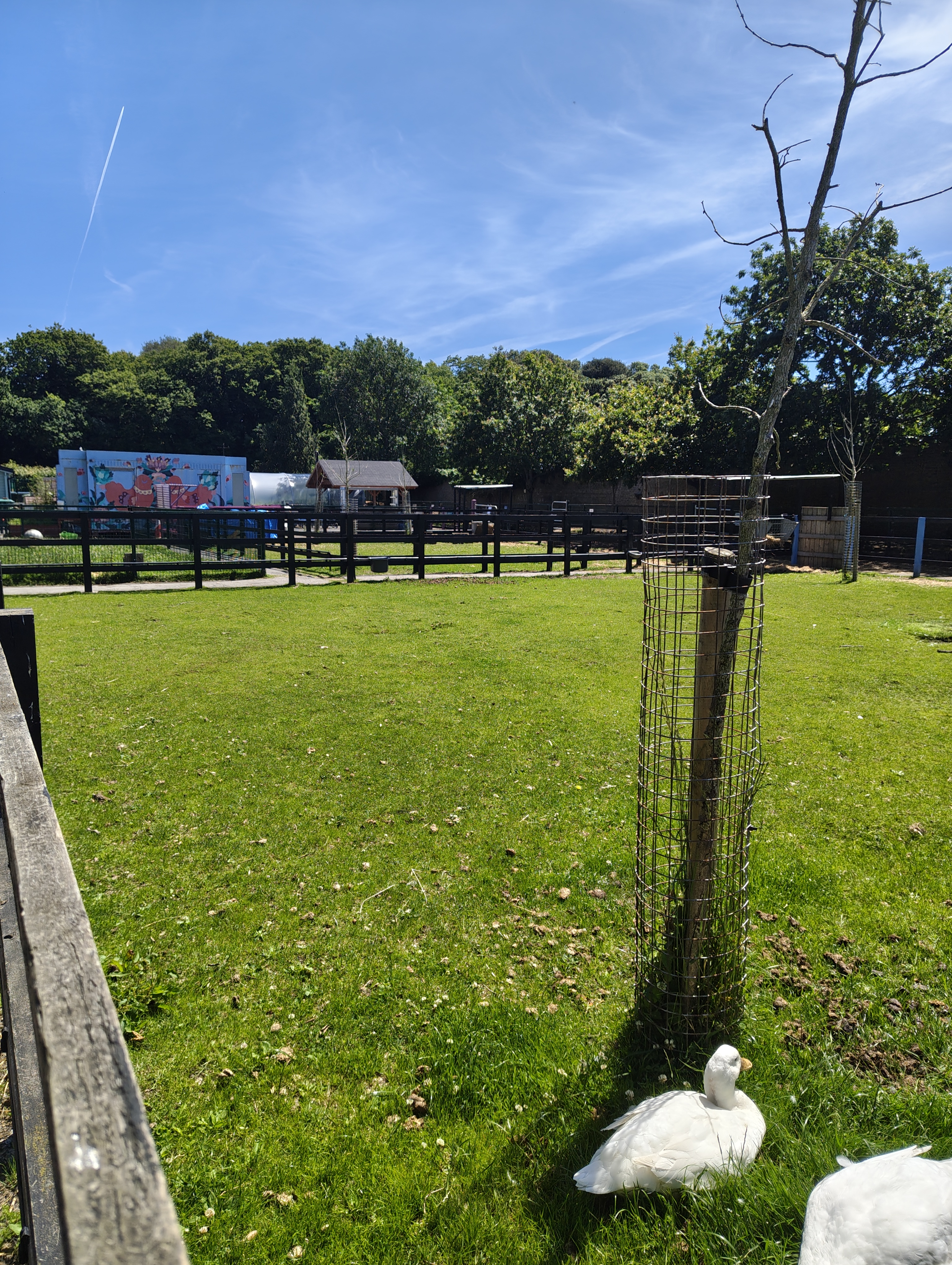
St Anne's City Farm

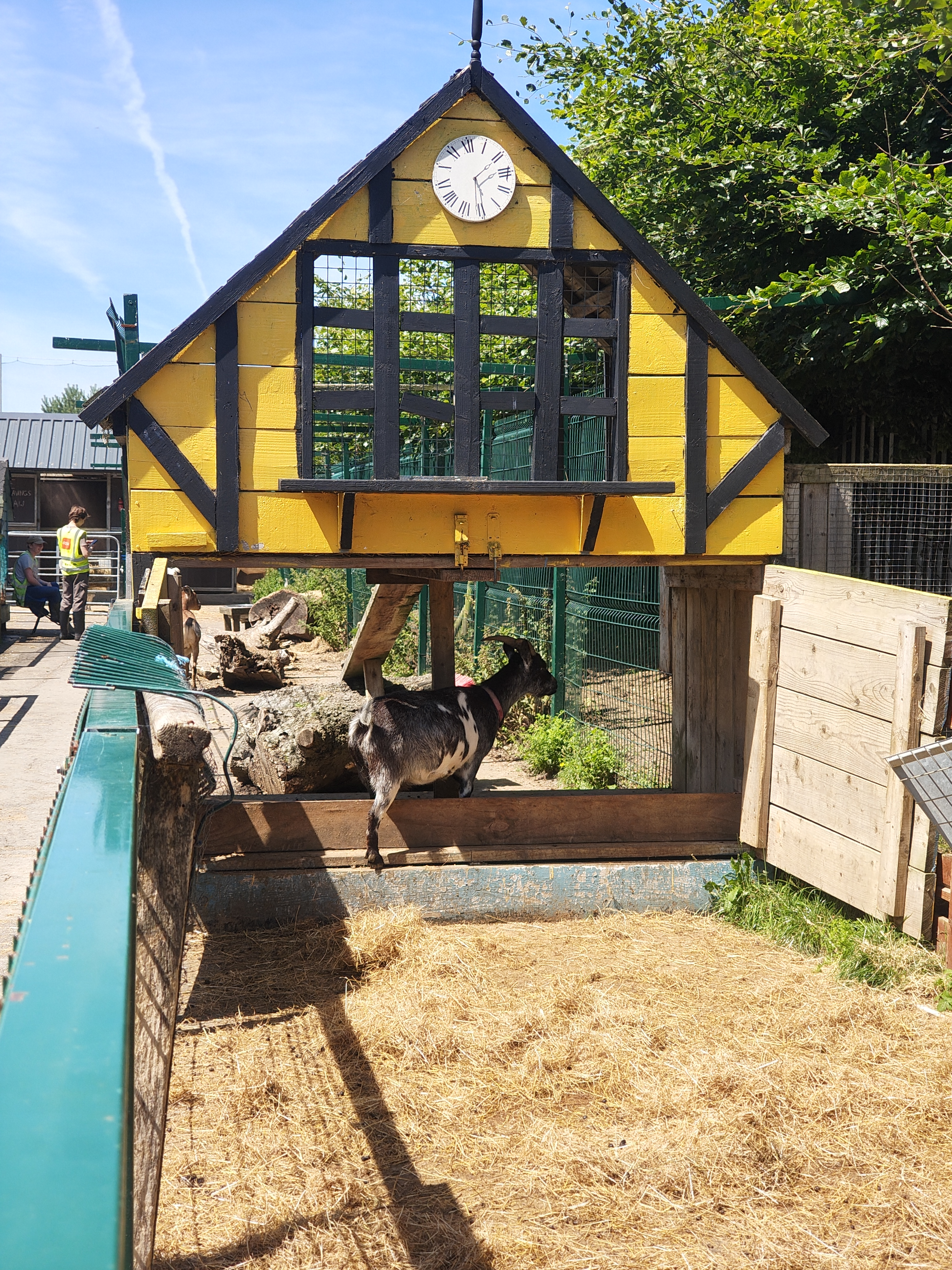
Goats at the City Farm

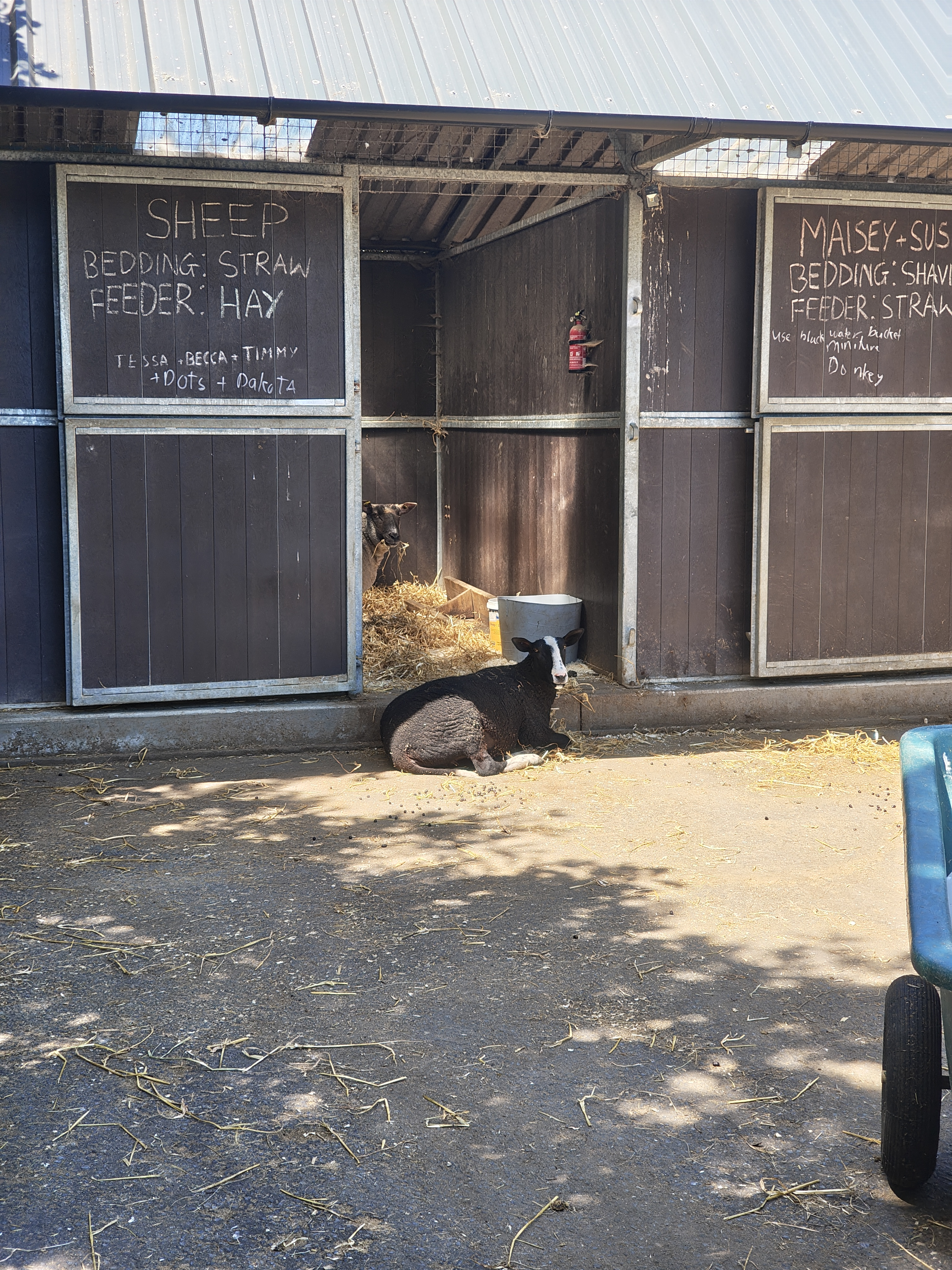
Animal enclosure at the City Farm

=== Former features ===
==== St. Anne's House ====
Soon after he acquired 'Thornhill House' in 1835 Benjamin Lee Guinness married and started to make alterations and improvements to the house. In 1840, Frederick Darley Ogilby described 'St Anne's House' as having a castle-like appearance, of irregular Gothic construction with a high tower'. Some time later 'Thornhill House' was pulled down. In 1873, Sir Arthur Guinness commissioned James Franklin Fuller architect to remodel 'Thornhill House.' Thomas Millard was appointed builder for the works. There was a falling out between the architect and his client and George Coppinger Ashlin was entrusted with completing the house. It was described as being 'The most palatial house built in Ireland during the second half of the 19th. century'. The eleven-bay house was two storeys high, with a three-bay pedimented breakfront, with elaborate armorials in its tympanum supported on Corinthian pilasters superimposed on Ionic half columns. It was built in the Italian neo-classical style using Bath and Portland stones. There was a single-storey Ionic port-cochere. Pediments over the upper floor windows were segmental and those on the lower floor triangular. There was a fine curvilinear glasshouse/ conservatory designed and built by Turner attached to the house.

==== Former walled garden ====
The walled garden next to the house also contained many features, of which few traces remain. The garden was entered through a claire-voie screen of bronze, painted yew green and elaborately gilded. The centre walk of the garden consisted of a castellated yew hedge with marble statuary along its length. The walk terminated in a nymphaeum, flanked by obelisks of yew and featuring a sculpted group of Jupiter and Thetis. Also in the walled house garden was an aviary with golden pheasants; a floral temple of arches and chains in cast iron; and a circular yew hedge with allegorical marble Italian statues representing the five continents, which were reflected in a great circular marble basin in the centre. The Georgian door-case of the original house Thornhill was also erected as an entrance to a French lavender garden.

== Leisure facilities ==
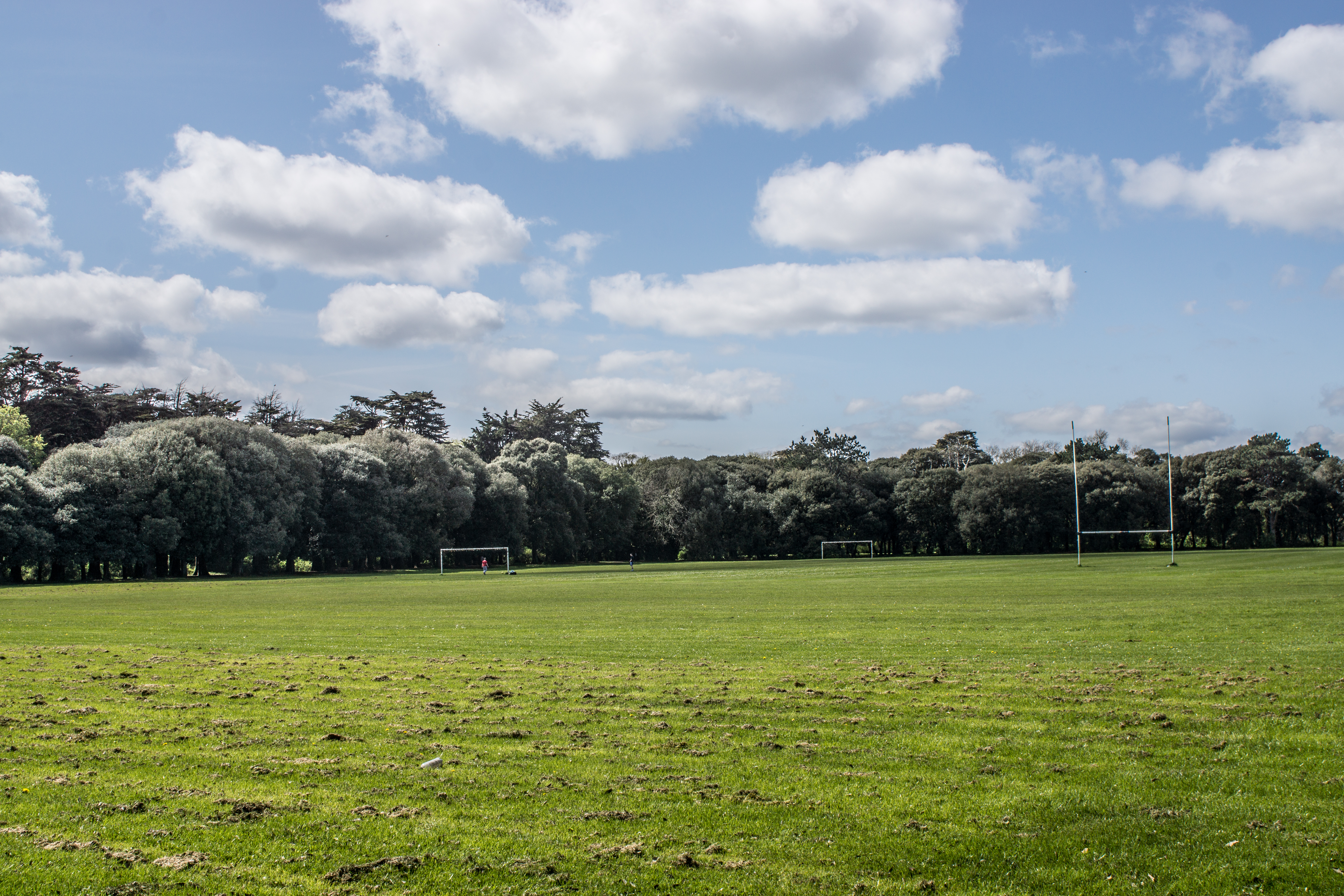
Playing pitches in St. Anne's Park

The park is intensively used by the sporting public. Facilities include 35 playing pitches. There is an all-weather cricket crease in the middle of the main playing fields area, and one pitch is floodlit for Gaelic games. North Dublin Softball Club also use the park for training.

There are 18 hard-surfaced tennis courts (some managed by Raheny Tennis Club), and a par-3 golf course. There is a coffee and snack cabin by the golf and tennis courts. There are also 4 Boules (pétanque) courts, a BMX area, and a model car racing track.

Woodland paths provide for walkers and joggers. There is a weekly free 5 km parkrun on Saturday mornings at 9:30 in the park.

== Fauna ==
Mammals present in the park include badgers, hedgehogs, rabbits, foxes, grey squirrels, house mice, field mice, pipistrelle bats and brown rats. Birds include sparrow hawk, woodcock and jay. The park has a greater-than-average diversity of bee species and is also notable for many species of butterflies.

=== Squirrels ===
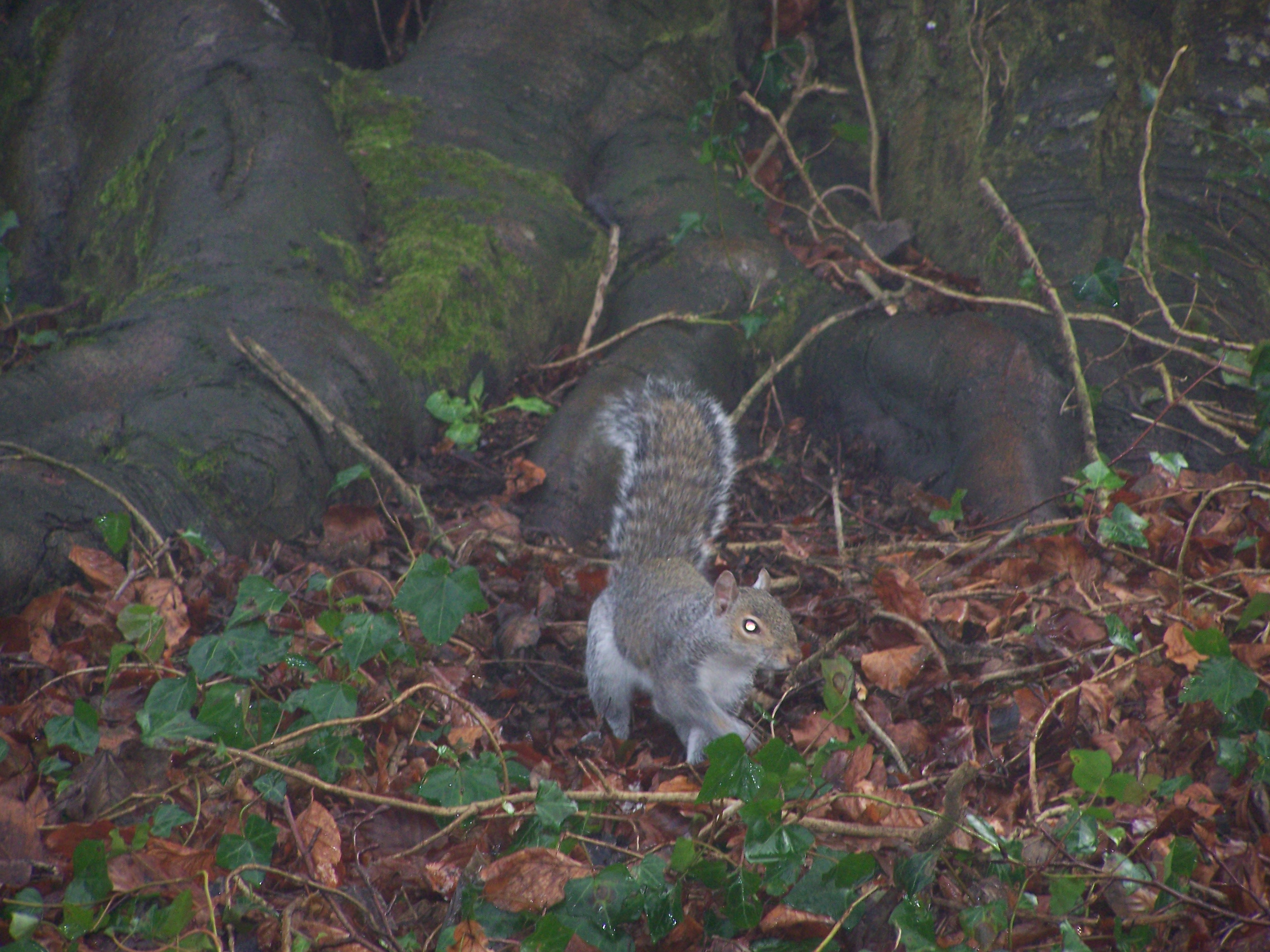
A grey squirrel in the park

Red squirrels were formerly numerous in the park, which was one of the last strongholds of the species in Dublin. Grey squirrels were first noticed at the Sybil Hill end of the park in 1998. The grey squirrels have since spread throughout the park and numbers of reds have been drastically reduced. A programme to reduce grey squirrels was carried out by Dublin City Council and University College Dublin, but the remaining red squirrel population was not reproducing and has crashed, for reasons uncertain. It is hoped that a re-introduction programme will be possible in future.

== Flora ==
The park has a range of vegetation habitats and many historic trees. The plant collections are of national importance. There are also protected native plants and species of botanical interest. These are surveyed and managed by Dublin City Council Parks and Landscape Services Division.

== Blackbush or Heronstown ==
A cluster of about 15 cottages once existed at Blackbush Lane. They were removed around the 1850s.

== See also ==
All Saints' Church, Raheny, discussing a Church of Ireland church and verger's lodge built on the edge of the estate before the park was formed.
