= Niall de Buitléar =

Irish artist

Niall de Buitléar (born 1983) is an Irish artist working in sculpture, painting, printmaking and drawing.

== Education and career ==
De Buitléar is a graduate of the Dublin Institute of Technology. He was awarded a studio membership at Temple Bar Gallery and Studios from 2011 to 2014. De Buitléar was also the winner of the fourth annual Wexford Arts Centre Emerging Visual Artist Award in 2009 and the Irish Artists' Residential Studio Award 2009 – 2010 at the Red Stables in St Anne's Park, Dublin.

== Work ==
Writing about his exhibitions, The Irish Times art critic Aidan Dunne, described De Buitléar's paintings as "built from intricate concentric patterns, [that] are geometric but also suggestive of organic processes. They equate to the world outside: complex and orderly but also contingent and unpredictable. Their handmade precision makes them visually fascinating". Dunne has also written that "De Buitléar's paintings and sculptures start with a basic geometric motif, the circle. This circular unit reverberates through varieties of echoing, concentric patterns. On the one hand the patterning is absolutely strict, retaining its geometric basis. On the other, the works are made by hand, so that tiny fluctuations of touch, the fallibility of the human hand, is part of the overall character of the works. In fact, it's essential to their character."

== Selected exhibitions ==
- In 2010 De Buitléar exhibited sculptures and drawings at the RHA, Dublin for the group exhibition Futures 10.
- Out of Order was a solo exhibition of drawings and paper sculptures by the artist held at The Lab in Dublin in the summer of the 2011.
- De Buitléar's solo exhibition 'Beneath That Darkness There Was Another' was held at Pallas Projects, Dublin in March and April 2015. The exhibition featured painting, sculpture and laser-engraved panels and was the first time the artist exhibited a collection of paintings.
- In August 2015 De Buitléar participated in the group exhibition Approaching the Landscape at RUA RED, Tallaght.
- A solo exhibition of his work titled Push and Pull was held at the Royal Hibernian Academy in January 2018.
- In November 2019, two paintings were included in an exhibit curated by Robert Armstrong at the Dunamaise Arts Centre, Portlaoise.
