= St. Ann's Well, Raheny =

Holy well in Dublin, Ireland

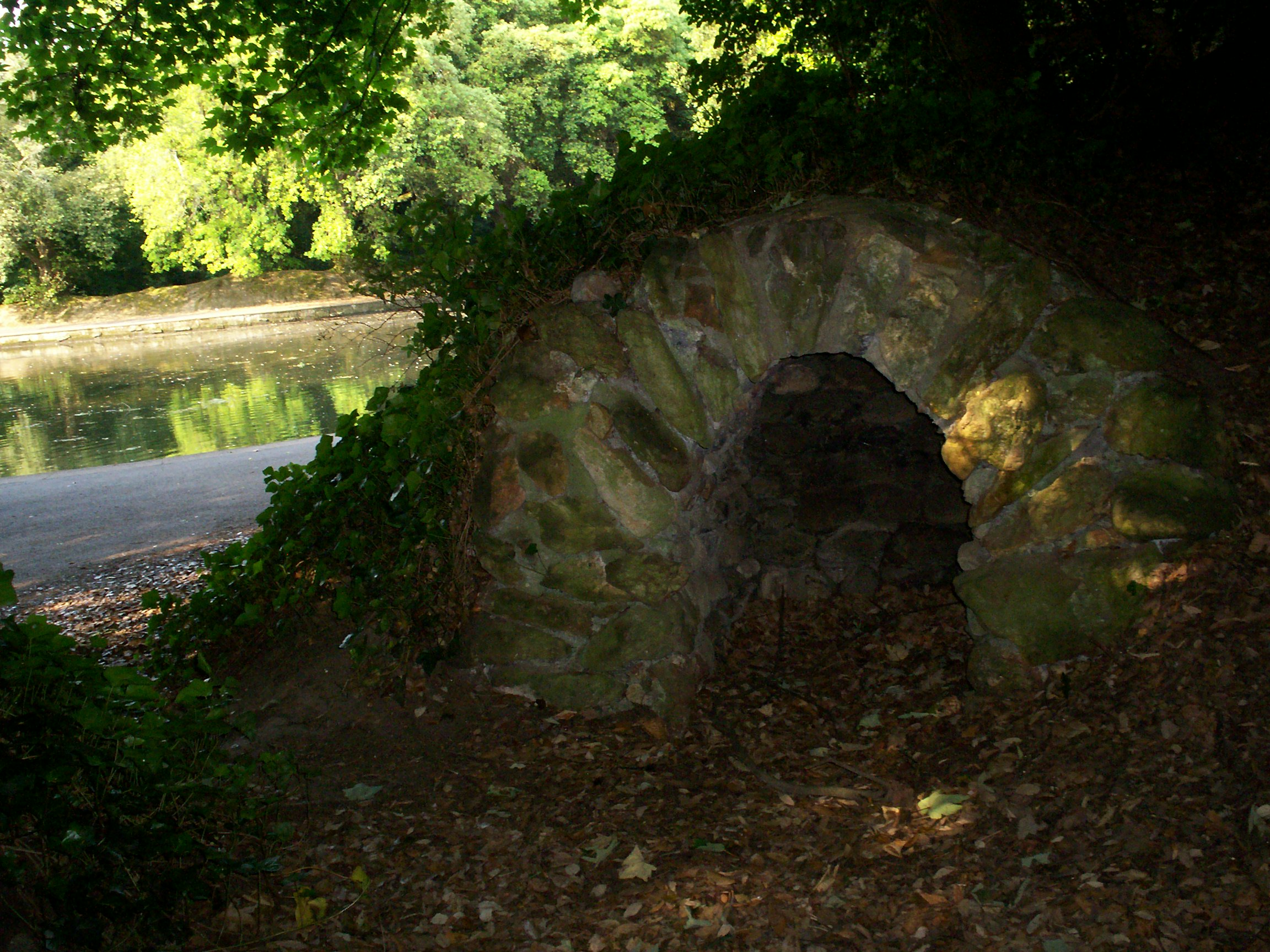
St. Ann's Well

St. Ann's Well is a holy well in Raheny, Dublin, Ireland, and gave its name (with a slightly different spelling) to St. Anne's Park, the city's second largest municipal park, home for many years to the Guinness family.

== Location ==
The well site has a protective hood of stones, and lies just beyond the old lake of the park, with its Roman temple, and below the Watchtower folly, near the main coastal entrance.

== History ==
The well itself dried up in the 1950s, and although Dublin City Council made several attempts to relocate the source, it remains dry as of 2021. The site is still respected, and was visited in 2000 by a formal joint procession of worshippers from the Raheny parishes of the Roman Catholic Church and Church of Ireland. The site was cleaned of soil and vegetation by a specialist contractor in early 2018, the original well opening located, and a safety grille, also keeping leaves out, was fitted over the former outlet.
