= Spitalfields City Farm =

City farm in London, England

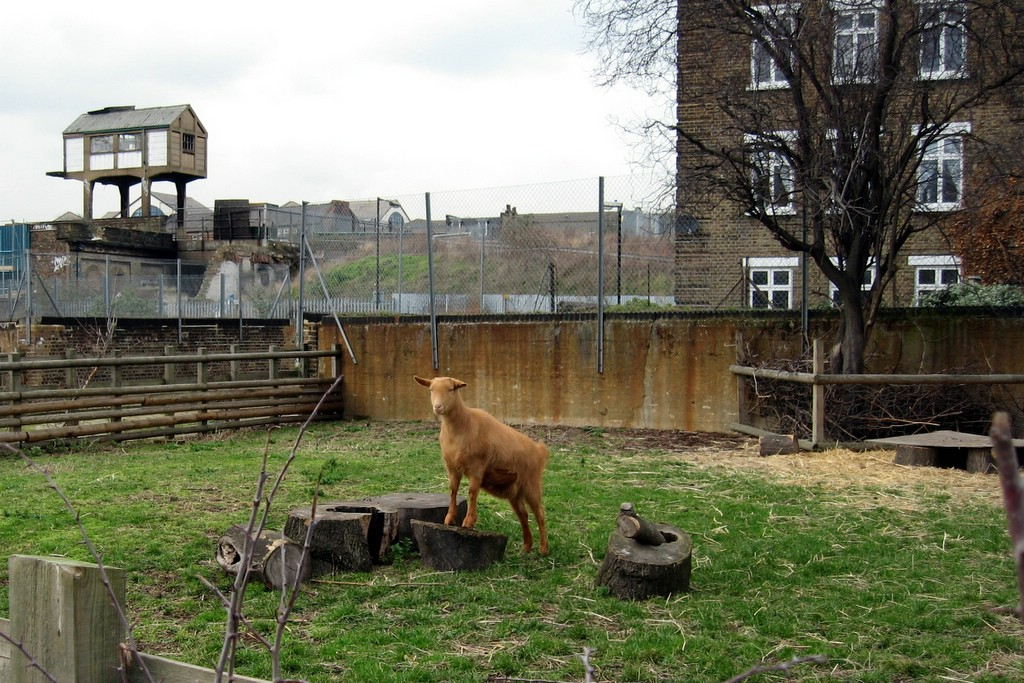

- Location within Greater London
- Type: City Farm
- Location: Tower Hamlets, London
- Coordinates: 51°31′19″N 0°04′01″W
- Visitors: 18,000
- Open: Tuesday to Sunday
- Website: https://www.spitalfieldscityfarm.org

Spitalfields City Farm is a city farm in the London Borough of Tower Hamlets, a short distance from Brick Lane.

The farm was opened in 1978 on a 1.3-acre (0.53 ha) wasteland site that was a former railway goods depot. Initially an allotment site, it expanded to house animals, and became a charity in 1980.

Since 2008 the farm has held an annual "Oxford vs Cambridge Goat Race", coinciding with and parodying The Boat Race on the River Thames.
