= Foley Street =

Street in central Dublin, Ireland

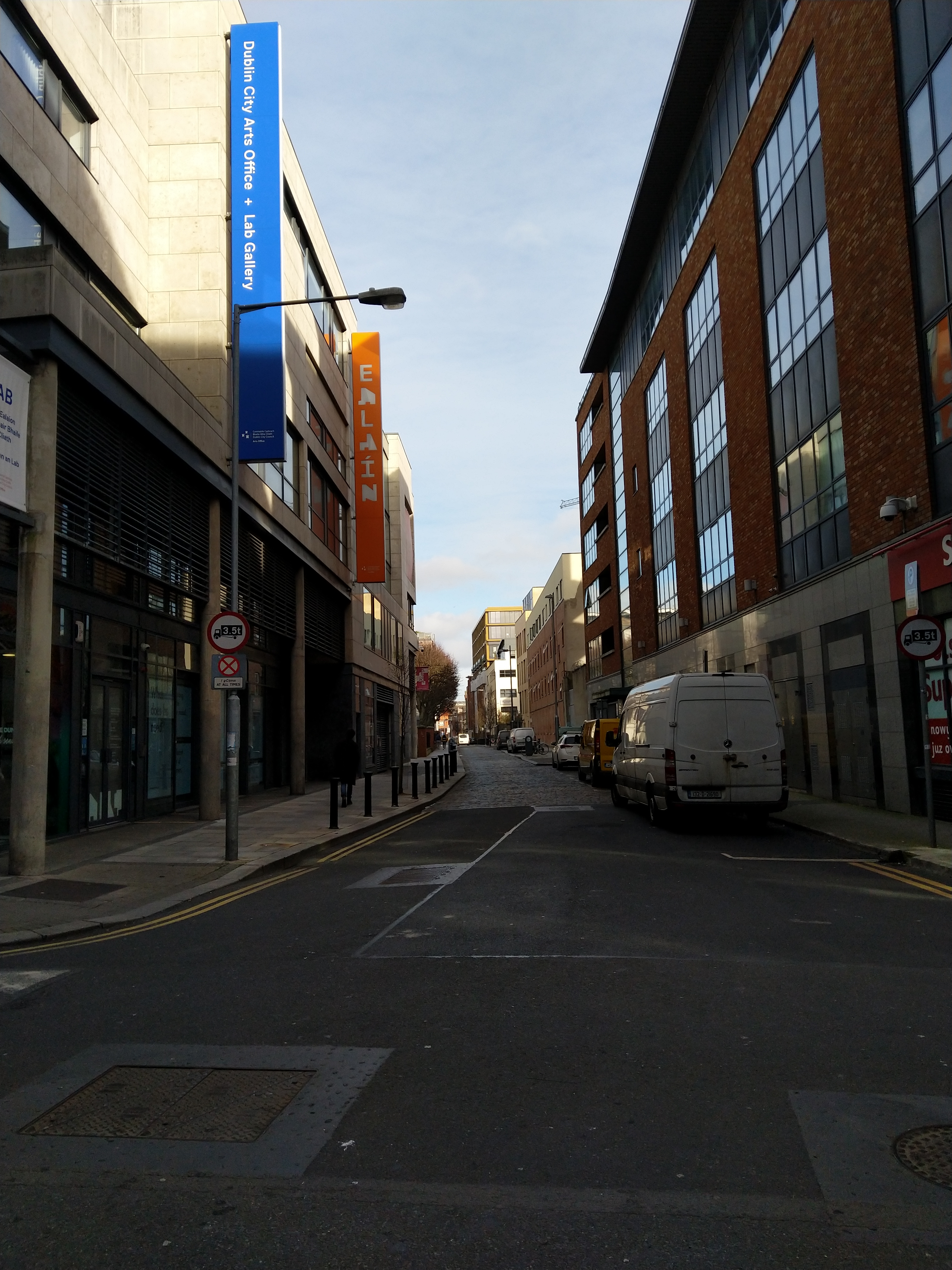
- As seen from James Joyce Street

- Location within Central Dublin
- Native name: Sráid Uí Fhoghlú (Irish)
- Former names: Worlds End Lane (From at least 1723-1776); Montgomery Street (1776-1906)
- Namesake: Elizabeth Montgomery (1776-1906); John Henry Foley (1906-present)
- Postal code: D01
- Coordinates: 53.352123°N 6.2510393°W
- west end: James Joyce Street
- east end: Buckingham Street Lower

Other
- Known for: association with the historical area the Monto

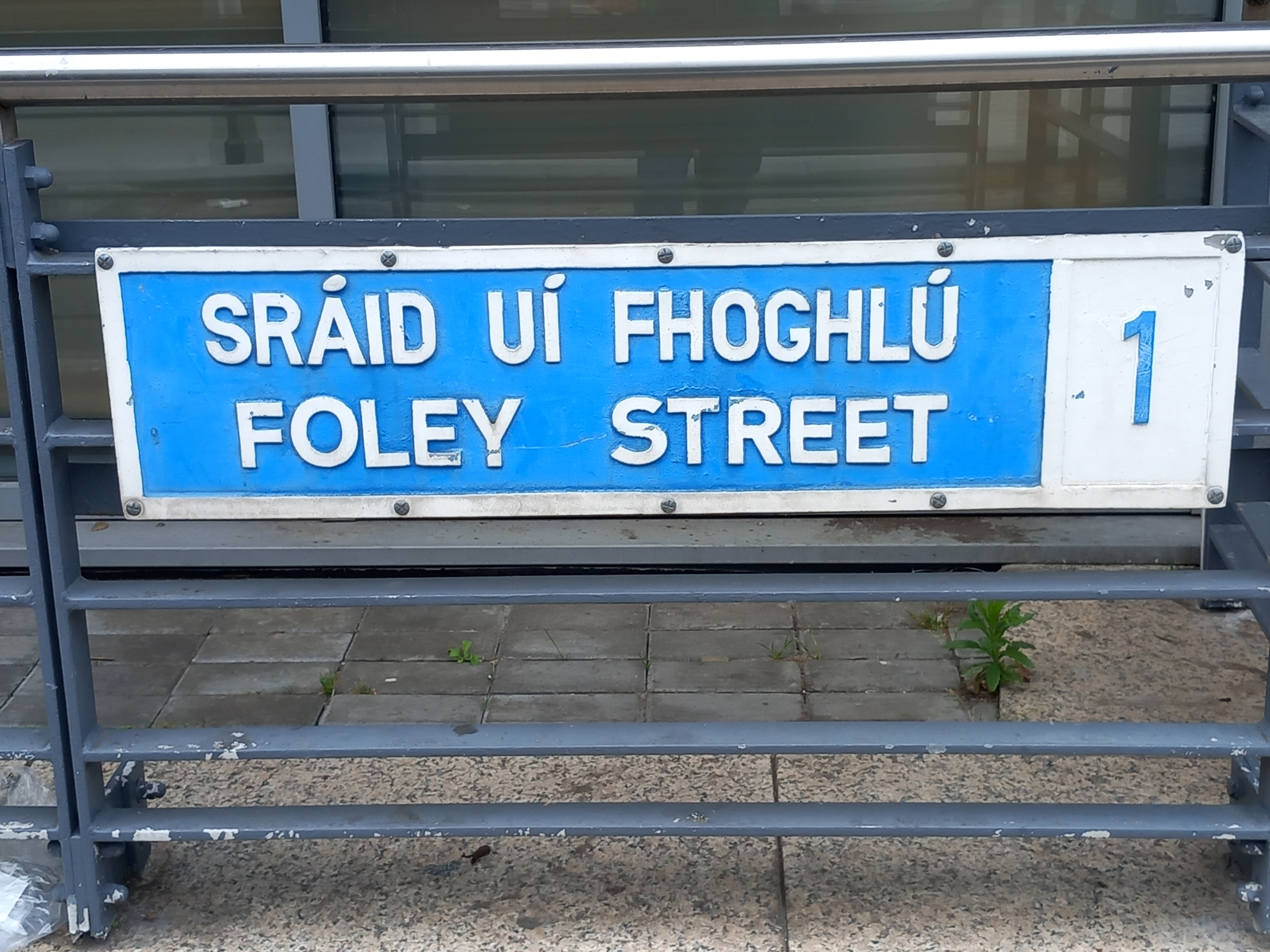

Foley Street (Irish: Sráid Uí Fhoghlú) is a street in Dublin running from James Joyce Street to Buckingham Street Lower. It was formerly known as Worlds End Lane and Montgomery Street.

It runs parallel to Railway Street to its north.

== History ==
It is first recorded as World's End Lane in the Dublin Intelligence of 1723 and appears with buildings along both of its sides but is left unnamed on Charles Brooking's map of Dublin (1728). Its proximity to the shoreline which was known as World's End was a common trope of the era referring to the street or area at the edge of the city.

It is again referred to as World's End Lane in the Georgian era in Rocque's map of Dublin from 1756-62 with the area showing market gardening and some industrial activity.

The area was further developed in the 1780s following the construction of the Custom House.

The street was later named Montgomery Street likely after the wife of Luke Gardiner, Elizabeth Montgomery. It is from this street name that the name of the historical red light district, the Monto, was derived.

It was later renamed Foley Street, after the 19th century sculptor, John Henry Foley who was born on 6 Montgomery Street.

In 1975, a documentary was made about some of the children of the street called The Boys of Foley Street by Pat Kenny, with follow-ups in 1988 and 2008. The theatre company Anu Productions created an interactive theatrical piece based on the documentary in 2012 as part of their four part Monto Cycle of plays.

== Notable buildings ==
The Dublin City Council has its art office and gallery space, the LAB, on Foley Street. This building is shared with Dance Ireland. It was opened in 2005.

== Notable residents ==
- Edward Smyth (sculptor)
