= James Carlile (disambiguation) =

James Carlile may refer to:

- James Carlile (1784–1854), Scottish clergyman
- James Carlile (actor) (died 1691), English actor
- James Carlile McCoan (1829–1904), Irish politician
