= Scots Presbyterian Church, Dublin =

Former Presbyterian Church in Dublin, Ireland

- Duke of Gloucester Chapel
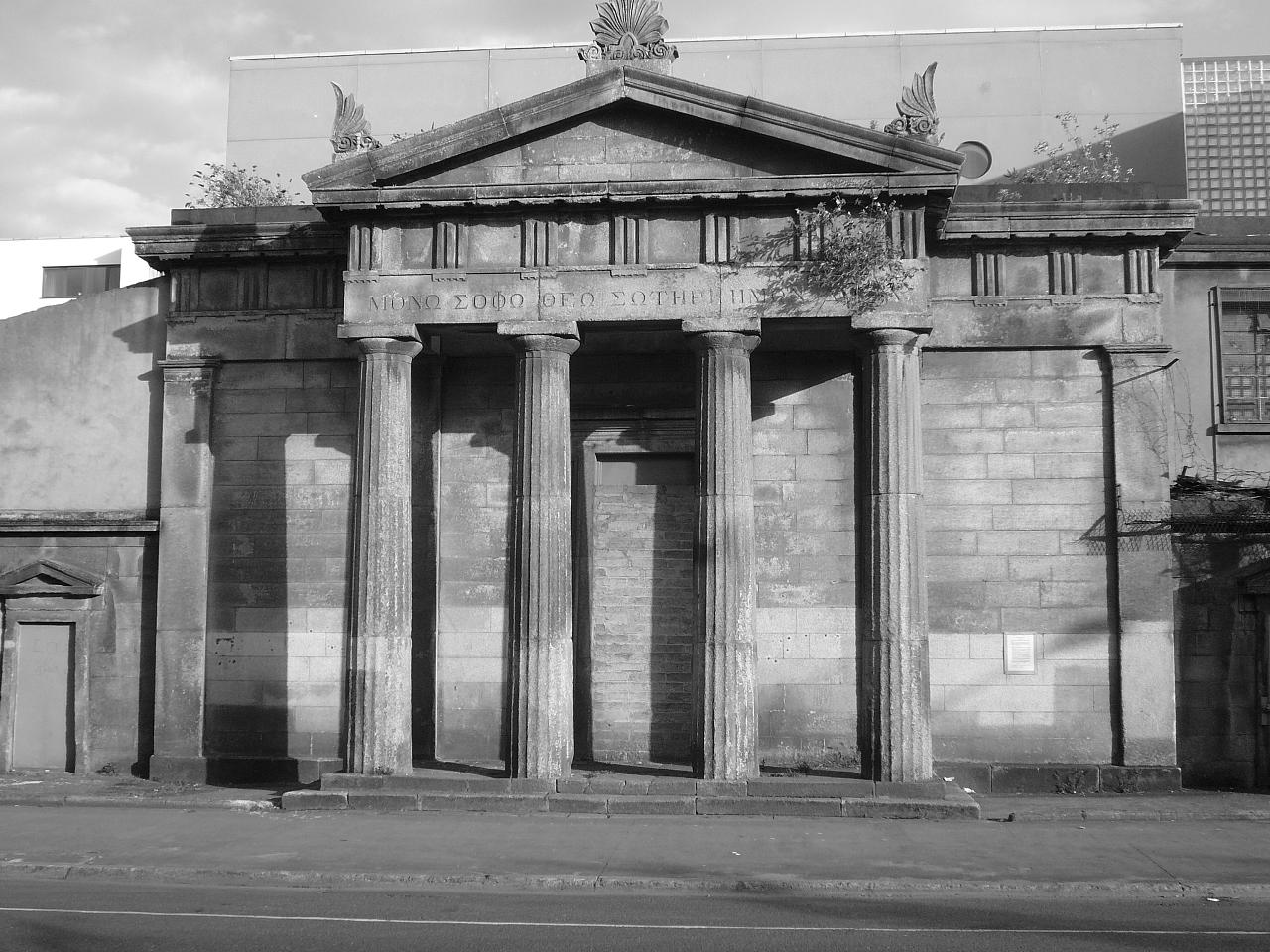

- Location within Central Dublin
- 53.354056°N 6.250618°W
- Location: 62 Seán McDermott Street, County Dublin
- Country: Ireland
- Denomination: Presbyterian

History
- Founded: 1846

Architecture
- Architect: Duncan Campbell Ferguson
- Architectural type: Church
- Style: Greek revival

The Scots Presbyterian Church is a ruined former church on Seán McDermott Street (formerly Gloucester Street North or Gloucester Street Lower) in Dublin 1, Ireland. The church was designed in a Greek revival style by architect Duncan Campbell Ferguson and completed in 1846 at a cost of £1,800.

The building operated as a Presbyterian church from 1846 until 1888 when the congregation was subsumed by the nearby Clontarf and Scots Presbyterian Church. The building continued to operate as a sometime church for various services until 1896, at which point the building began being used by the Salvation Army owing to its position in the centre of the Monto area of Dublin. In the early 1900s it was converted into a flour mill but its external appearance remained largely intact. It was operated by AW Ennis Limited until a fire in the 1980s forced the business to move to Virginia, County Cavan where it remains as of July 2020. It was subsequently used as a grain store.

== History ==
The church replaced an earlier Ebenezer Chapel (which was established in 1820 as an independent chapel) which the second secession synod congregation had purchased on the corner of Hawkins Street and D'Olier Street, Dublin 2 in 1836 for £600.

The Scots Church and Ormond Quay Presbyterian church amalgamated in 1938, with the Ormond Quay congregation joining the Scots congregation.

In 2003, the Ormond Quay and Scots Church voted to merge with the Clontarf Presbyterian Church, sanctioned by the General Assembly to create the Clontarf & Scots Presbyterian Church, and they moved to Clontarf, Dublin.

== Architecture ==
The squat church was constructed in Irish granite with a prostyle tetrastyle pedimented portico with four fluted Doric columns on a stylobate supporting frieze with Greek script which have the words "ΜΟΝΩ ΣΟΦΩ ΘΕΩ ΣΩΤΗΡI ΗΜΩΝ ΔOΞA" (Romanized monō sophō Theō sōtēri hēmōn doxa), referring to a biblical passage from Jude 1:25 and translating roughly as "To only-wise God, be glory through [the] savior". Above this sits a modillioned pediment with acroteria situated at either end and at the apex.

The majority of the external features remained intact until the 1980s with a Dublin City Council photo from 1968 detailing the external walls, chimneys and roof as they would have been when the building was first constructed. Following the fire, the majority of the building was demolished for safety reasons. The remaining facade and side walls now sit at the front of 2000s apartment development although many of the main features are still intact.

The buildings risk status is currently listed as at 'moderate' by An Taisce and is currently listed on the Record of Protected Structures under RPS 7480.

== Popular culture ==
The building appears in a derelict state on the front cover of the 1997 single Keep on Chewin by the Jubilee Allstars.

== See also ==
- Abbey Presbyterian Church, Dublin
- Ormond Quay Presbyterian church
- Plunket Street Meeting House
- St. Thomas's Church (old), Dublin and St. Thomas's Church, Cathal Brugha Street
