= William Woty =

William Woty (1731?–1791) was an English law clerk and hack writer, known for light verse.

== Life ==
Among his poems is an elegy on his schoolmaster, who lived near Alton, Hampshire. He came to London as a clerk or writer to a solicitor. He began speaking in debating societies and contributing short poems to newspapers. He subsisted for some years as a Grub Street writer.

About 1767 he became companion and legal adviser to Washington Shirley, 5th Earl Ferrers, who supported Woty by a charge on his estate in Leicestershire. He died at Loughborough on 15 March 1791, aged about sixty.

== Works ==
Someone published in 1758, without his consent, in a borrowed name, a small piece of his composition called The Spouting-club. He himself issued in 1760, under the pseudonym of ‘J. Copywell of Lincoln's Inn,’ a volume entitled The Shrubs of Parnassus consisting of the "poetical essays" he had contributed to newspapers.

Woty's other works included:

- ‘Campanologia: a Poem in praise of Ringing’ [anon.], 1761.
- ‘Muses' Advice addressed to the Poets of the Age,’ 1761.
- ‘The Blossoms of Helicon,’ 1763. It contained, with a hymn to good nature by Dr. James Solas Dodd, a description by Woty of White Conduit House. These lines, which made their first appearance in the Gentleman's Magazine for 1760, were quoted at length in George Walter Thornbury's Old and New London;; and in Warwick William Wroth and Arthur Edgar Wroth's The London Pleasure Gardens of the Eighteenth Century (1896).
- ‘The Poetical Calendar,’ a supplement to Robert Dodsley's collection, 1763; twelve volumes, one for each month in that year. They were edited by Woty and Francis Fawkes.
- ‘Church Langton:’ a poem, n.d. [1768?], in praise of the charitable projects of the Rev. William Hanbury.
- ‘The Female Advocate:’ a poem, 1770, 2nd edit. 1771.
- ‘Poetical Works,’ 1770, 2 vols.; dedicated to Earl Ferrers.
- ‘The Stage,’ n.d. [1770?].
- ‘Particular Providence:’ a poetical essay, 1774.
- ‘The Estate Orators: a Town Eclogue’ [anon.], 1774; a satire on the London auctioneers.
- ‘Poems on several Occasions,’ 1780; this contained reprints of several of his works.
- ‘Fugitive and Original Poems,’ 1786, contains ‘The Country Gentleman: a Drama.’
- ‘Poetical Amusements,’ 1789, dedicated to Robert Shirley, 6th Earl Ferrers. It contained a Latin version of Thomas Gray's Elegy; ‘Sunday Schools: a Poetical Dialogue between a Nobleman and his Chaplain;’ and ‘The Ambitious Widow: a Comic Entertainment.’
