= Trinity Church, Dublin =

Former episcopal church in Ireland, disused and reopened

Coordinates: 53°21′00″N 6°15′16″W

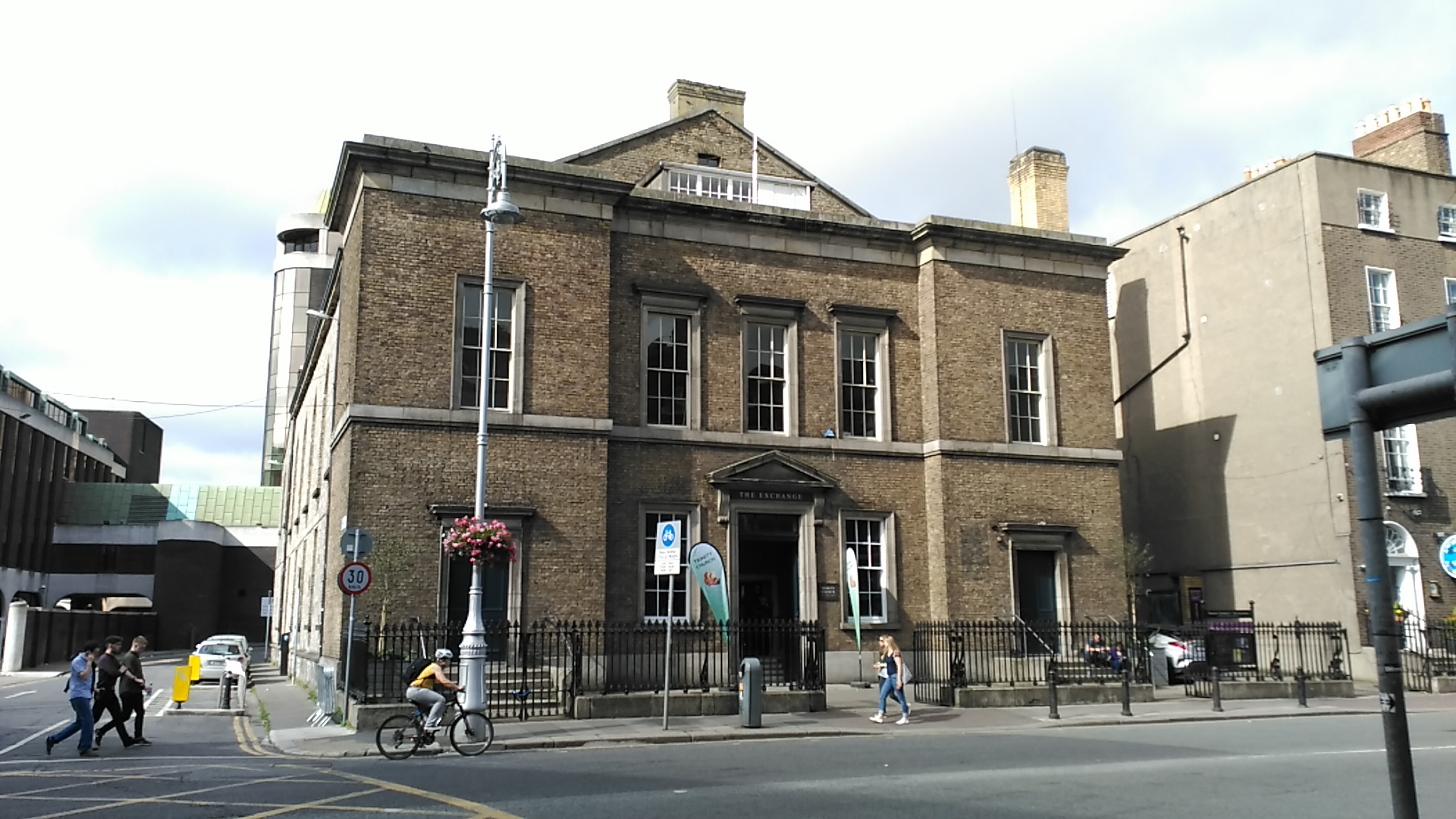
Trinity Church in September 2018

Trinity Church, Dublin, also called the Protestant Episcopal Church, was a Church of Ireland church on Gardiner Street in Dublin, Ireland, the building of which began in 1838. It closed around 1909 and was reopened in the 2000s by an independent Christian group.

== History ==
Trinity Church was designed by Frederick Darley who designed many buildings in Trinity College Dublin, and the church would have accommodated up to 1,800 people. The first rector was the future Bishop of Cork, Rev. John Gregg from 1839 until his elevation in 1862 to Bishop. Mr. Vance, a wealthy Dublin businessman, funded it, on condition that Rev. Gregg could raise the other half of the money required to build it, which he did. It was a Proprietary Church, independently funded by wealthy laypeople, and the term "Episcopal" was used to distinguish it from other movements in the reformed faith at the time - the church was evangelical, verging on Calvinist. The Rev. Dr. John Duncan Craig served as the incumbent in Gardiner street from 1884 until 1901, he was a poet, chaplain in the Franco-Prussian war, and a deputy chaplain in the Orange Order.

Construction began in 1838 and the church opened in 1839 in Gardiner Street Dublin.

Trinity Church Schools were developed at the church, along Beresford lane.

== People Associated with Trinty Church, Dublin ==
Rev. Thomas Preston Ball(c.1825-1913) served as Chaplain of Trinity Church, Dublin, from 1879 to 1884. The Rev. John Olphert Gage Dougherty served as Rector of Trinity Church, Dublin, from 1902 to 1904. George Howard, 7th Earl of Carlisle, attended services in the Church as did the future provost of Trinity College John Pentland Mahaffy. Rev. Henry Irwin served as assistant chaplain to Bishop Gregg. Rev. A. Thomas was assistant chaplain.

== Closure ==
The Trinity Church built in 1839, closed in about 1909. It served as an Employment Exchange for almost a century, and the building became known as The Exchange. It closed as a labour exchange in 2003.

== Trinity Church Network and Reopening as a Church ==
In 2006 it was bought by a non-denominational Christian group formerly known as Fellowship Bible Church, and it reverted to being a church renaming itself The Trinity Church Network. Since 2015 the charity ACET which assists those living with HIV are hosted by the church at the exchange building. The Mustard Seed Project is an outreach project by the church. An annual Carol Service is hosted by the church in the build up to Christmas. Many of the lessons and sermons from the meetings are available to download from the "Trinity Radio" on the website and via iTunes.

== Protestant Episcopal Chapels ==
Other protestant episcopal churches at the time in Dublin were:-

- Bethesda Chapel, Dorset Street, Dublin.
- St. George's Church, Temple Street, Dublin.
- Free Church, Great Charles Street, Dublin.
- Episcopal Chapel, Upper Baggot Street, Dublin.
- Swift's Alley Free Church, Francis Street, Dublin
- Plunket Street Meeting House, Plunket St (now Dillon St.), Dublin
- Magdalen Asylum Chapel, Leeson Street, Dublin
- Mariners' Church, Dún Laoghaire
- St. Matthias' Church, Hatch St., established in 1842 by Rev. Maurice Day.
