= Abbey Presbyterian Church, Dublin =

Abbey Presbyterian Church
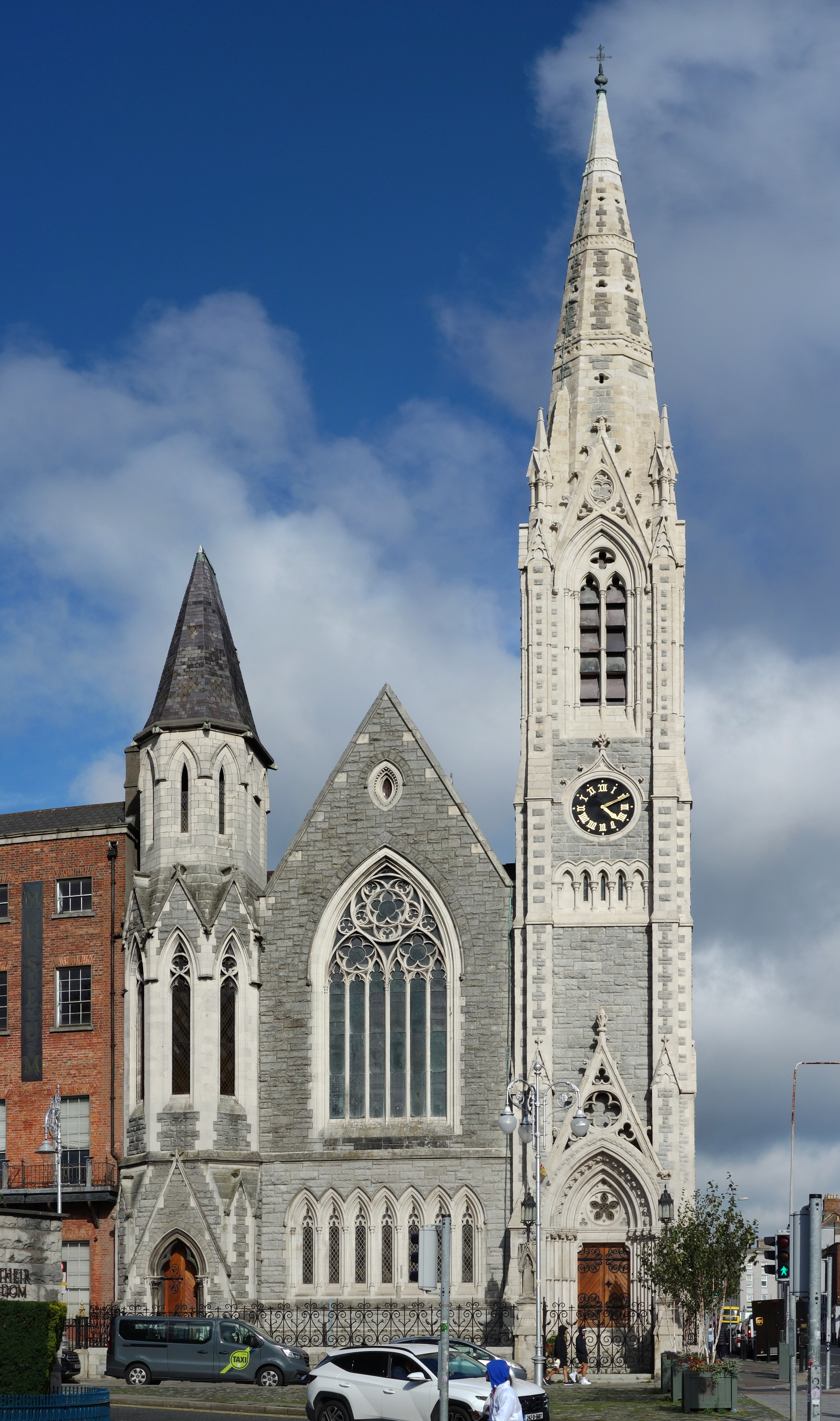
- Abbey Presbyterian Church
- Abbey Presbyterian Church
- Location: Parnell Square, Dublin
- Country: Ireland
- Denomination: Presbyterian
- Website: www.abbeychurch.ie

History
- Founded: 1864
- Founder: Alexander Findlater

Architecture
- Architect(s): Andrew Heiton; William Leiper
- Style: Gothic

Specifications
- Height: 180 feet (54.9 m) (Spire)

Abbey Presbyterian Church is a church located at Parnell Square, Dublin. Designed by architect Andrew Heiton of Perth, Scotland, it is a decorated Gothic building, with a spire 180 feet (54.9 m) high. The church was erected in 1864 with funding from Alexander Findlater (1797–1873), a Dublin merchant and philanthropist, and is known colloquially as "Findlater's church", and it is referred to in two of James Joyce's novels as Findlater's Church.

== History ==
The Church was built on the north eastern corner of Rutland (now Parnell) Square and North Frederick Street. It was built on the site of Headfort House (sometimes Bective House), which was owned by the Earl of Bective (also the Marquess of Headfort), and named after his family's County Meath estate at Headfort House. The Earl had moved from a house of the same name in Smithfield which had by that time become an unfashionable district.

One of the first preachers was John Hall (1829–1898).

The congregation had previously, from 1667 until 1864, worshipped on Capel Street, on the site of the old St. Mary's Abbey. It was founded by a preacher from Bull Alley, the Rev. William Jacque, who left along with some of its congregation to form the new church. The Capel Street Congregation was sometimes incorrectly referred to as the Scots Church, and confused with the Scots Presbyterian Church, Lower Abbey Street. In 1778 during Rev. McDowell's ministry, the congregation renamed itself Mary's Abbey Congregation (whence the Abbey Presbyterian Church gets its name).

In 1911 Abbey Church, along with other Presbyterian churches, The Scots Church, Ormond Quay church and Union Chapel, founded Lindsay Road National School.

In 1918 the Union Chapel, on Lower Abbey Street, whose chapel had been damaged during the 1916 Rising, joined the Abbey Presbyterian Church.

== People Associated with the Abbey Presbyterian Congregation ==
- Alexander Hutcheson, minister Capel St., Moderator of the Presbyterian Synod of Ulster in 1692
- Francis Iredell, minister Capel St., Moderator of the Synod of Ulster in 1701
- Robert Craghead, M.A., minister Capel St, Moderator of the Synod of Ulster in 1719
- Charles McCollum, minister Capel Street, Moderator of the Synod of Ulster in 1760
- John Baird D.D. minister Capel St., (1767-1777), conformed to the Church of Ireland, and recognised as an Irish divine.
- Benjamin McDowell D.D. minister Marys Abbey (1778-1813) served as Moderator of the Presbyterian Synod of Ulster 1786.
- James Horner D.D., moderator of the Synod of Ulster 1804.
- James Carlile D.D. minister in Mary' Abbey (1815-1839), moderator of the Synod of Ulster 1825, and Presbyterian General Assembly in 1845
- William Bailey Kirkpatrick D.D., moderator of the Presbyterian General Assembly in 1850
- Margaret Hamilton Reid, was an elder at Abbey Presbyterian Church for 46 years, and a co-founder of the Irish School of Ecumenics.

Margaret Boden OBE née Blythman was baptised in Abbey Presbyterian Church in 1948. Was married in 1969 to the Revd. Derek Boden and became the first female CEO of Christian Aid Ireland in 1998.
