= Mecklenburgh Street =

Street in Dublin, Ireland

- Mecklinburgh Street
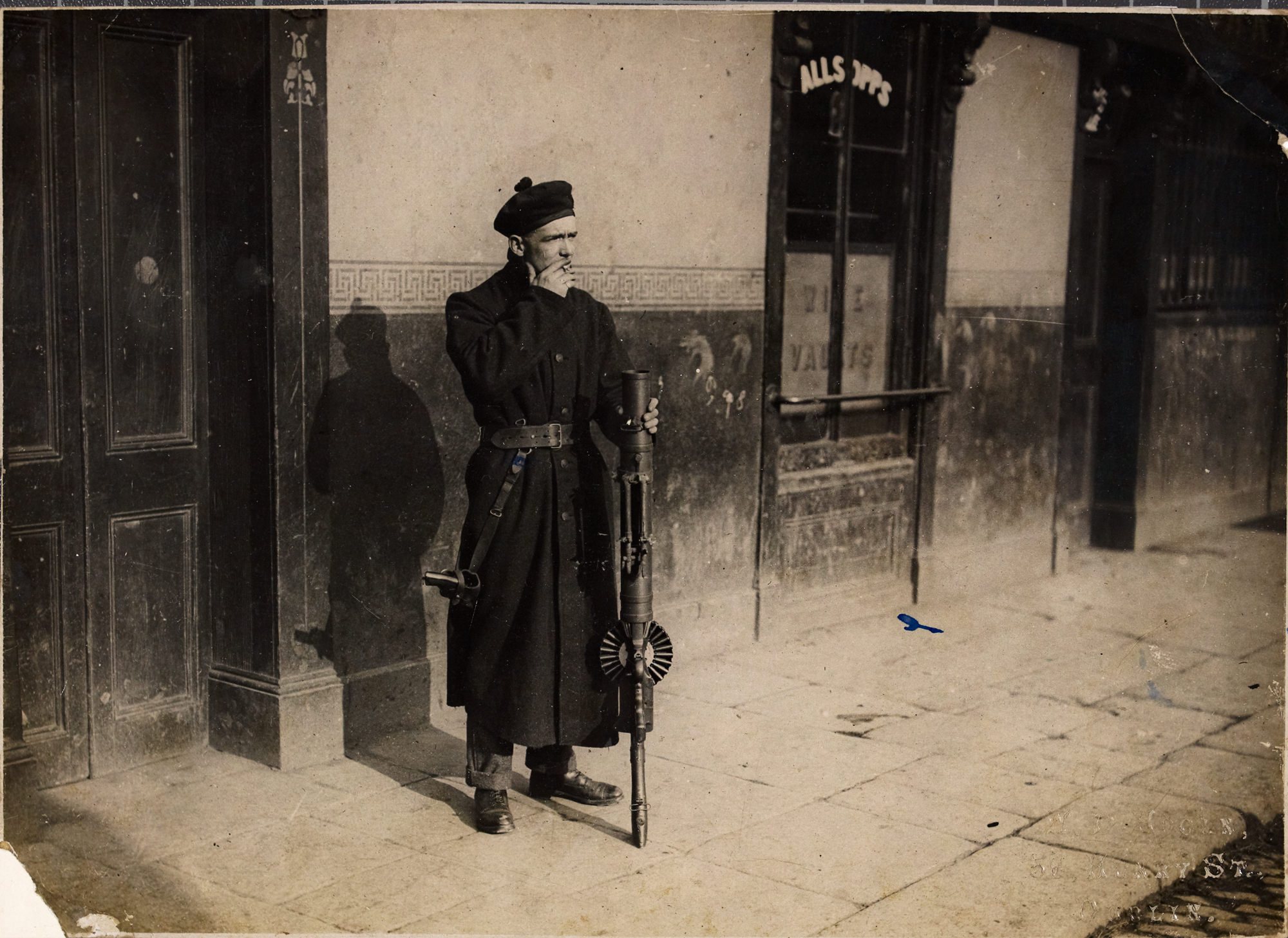
- A Black and Tan (auxilliary) on duty outside Hynes Pub in Dublin in 1921 on the corner of Railway Street and Gloucester Place Lower
- Interactive map of Mecklenburgh Street
- Former name: Great Martin's Lane (Prior to 1765)
- Namesake: Charlotte of Mecklenburg-Strelitz
- Location: Dublin, Ireland
- Coordinates: 53.352079°N 6.257074°W
- East: Buckingham Street
- West: Marlborough Street

Other
- Known for: Georgian architecture Monto

Mecklenburgh Street was a street in Dublin, Ireland first laid out in the 1760s along the course of a pre-existing route known as Great Martins Lane which extended from Marlborough Street nearly as far as the Strand and to what later became Buckingham Street.

The street was split later in two by Gardiner Street in the 1780s to form the western Upper Mecklenburgh Street and the eastern Lower Mecklenburgh Street.

The street was originally named for Charlotte of Mecklenburg-Strelitz, wife of George III from around 1765 and was renamed to Upper Tyrone Street (1886) and Lower Tyrone Street (1888) for nearby Tyrone House and later again these were renamed Waterford Street and Railway Street in 1911. On both occasions, this occurred owing to the areas connection with prostitution and the Monto red light district.

While Railway Street retains its name as of 2025, Waterford Street has now entirely disappeared and been replaced by an extension of the model school, social housing, private apartments and Larkin Community College in the second half of the 20th century.

== History ==
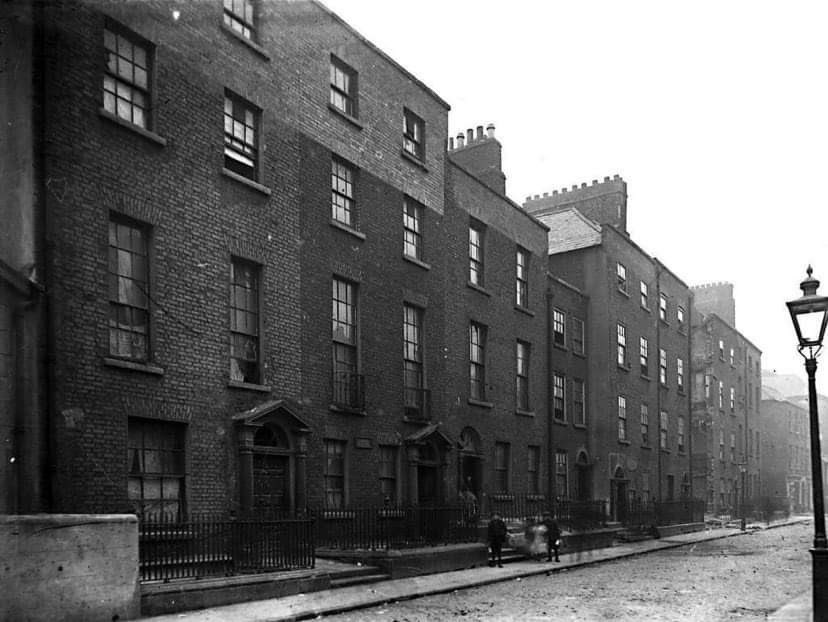
A photo of the North side of Waterford Street looking East in 1913.

The street is detailed but left unnamed on Charles Brooking's map of Dublin (1728).

The botanical gardens of the Royal Dublin Society were located off the street from approximately 1735 until 1795 with some of its meetings taking place in a house it had there up until around 1739. It later moved to Glasnevin in 1795 and ultimately became the National Botanic Gardens.

From the 1760s, large Georgian houses began to be developed at Upper Mecklenburgh Street, close to the corner of Marlborough Street.

The piano manufactory of Samuel Moreland was located at 63 Lower Mecklenburgh Street from 1809–32 and later at number 33 from around 1842-46.

In the later 19th century, prostitution in Dublin became more confined to the general Monto area of which Lower Mecklenburgh Street was central. From around 1870, women began moving into the cheap tenement housing and rooms for rent in the area and by 1885 brothels were extending into the district.

By the beginning of the 20th century, the area was one of the most impoverished in the city with multiple tenements. John Cooke's Dublin Housing Inquiry report of 1913 features photographs of the once grand interior of number 8 Waterford Street with corner fireplaces and panelled doors now in a state of dereliction.

The Companies Registration Office and the Competition and Consumer Protection Commission have their main offices at Bloom House on the corner of present day Railway Street, James Joyce Street and Gloucester Place Lower.

Year	Pre 1765	1765	1786	1886	1888	1911
Upper			Upper Mecklenburgh Street	Upper Tyrone Street	Upper Tyrone Street	Waterford Street
Lower			Lower Mecklenburgh Street	Lower Mecklenburgh Street	Lower Tyrone Street	Railway Street
Combined	Great Martins Lane	Mecklenburgh Street				

== Popular culture ==
In Ulysses by James Joyce, Bella Cohen's brothel is located at 82 Tyrone Street Lower and is the setting of episode 15 in the book.

== Notable residents ==
- James Gandon lived and had offices at number 7 Mecklenburgh Street from 1782
- Michael Stapleton - recorded at 16 Mecklenburgh Street in 1776-7
- John van Nost the younger lived at number 21 on the street at the time of his death circa 1780
- Henry A. Baker had property at 112 on the street from around 1810-31
- Thomas Farrell (sculptor)
- Patrick Heeney
- James Solas Dodd
