= James Joyce Street =

Street in central Dublin, Ireland

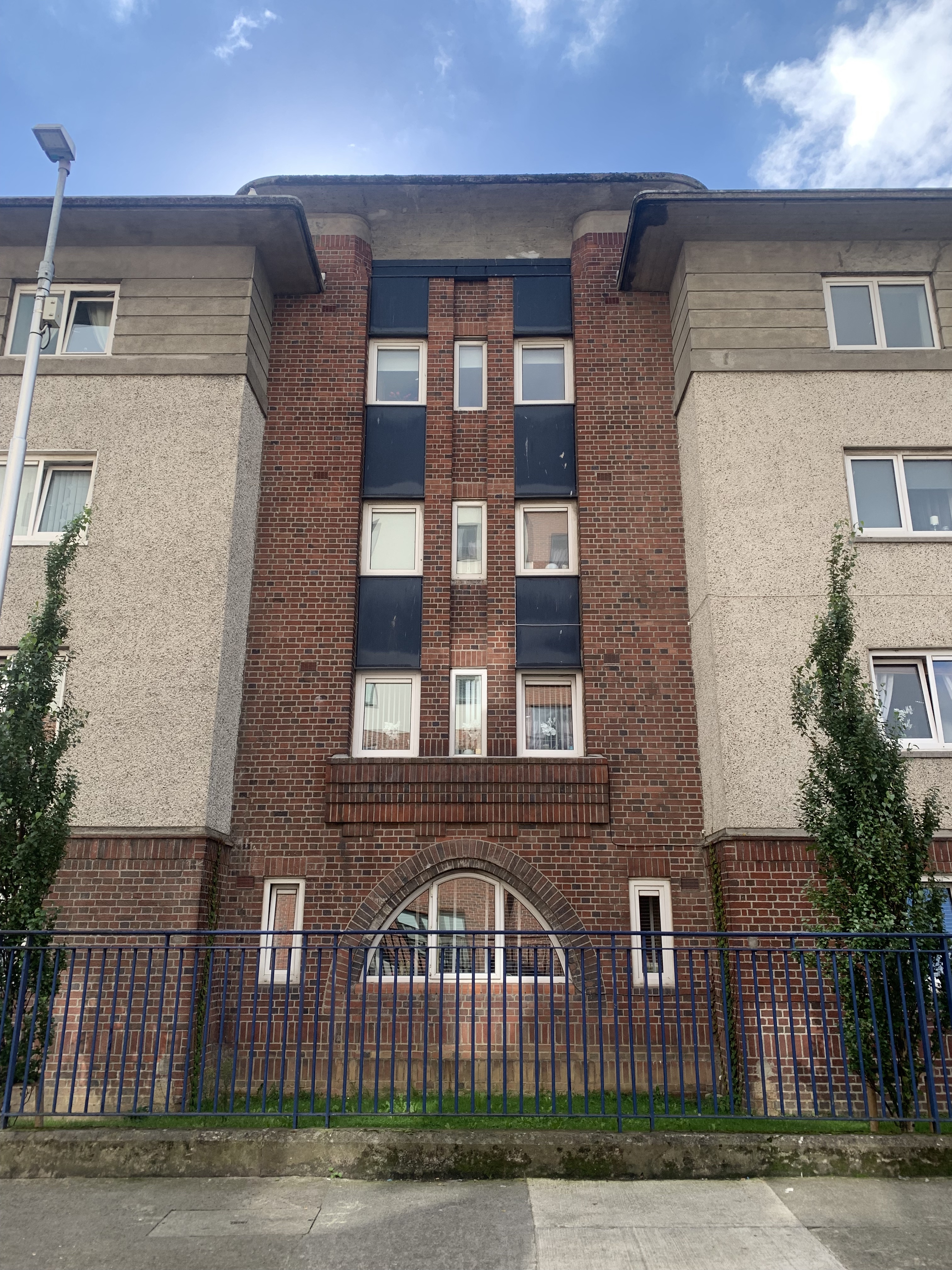
- An image of Liberty House apartments on the street
- Native name: Shráid James Joyce (Irish)
- Former names: Mabbot Street (1700s-1911); Corporation Street (1911-2001)
- Namesake: James Joyce
- Length: 200 m (660 ft)
- Postal code: D01
- south end: Talbot Street
- Major junctions: Foley Street
- north end: Railway Street
- North: Gloucester Place Lower
- South: Store Street

James Joyce Street (Irish: Shráid James Joyce) is a street in Dublin, Ireland which was formerly named Mabbot Street and Corporation Street.

The street contains a mix of offices, private apartments and social housing.

The street runs from Talbot Street at its south end to the junction of Railway Street at its North end. It runs parallel to Mabbot Lane and Gardiner Street to its West.

== History ==
James Joyce Street was originally known as Mabbot Street, and was part of the series of streets known as Dublin's red light district, the Monto, from the late 1800s to the 1920s. It was named for Gilbert Mabbot, who built a watermill in the area around 1674, which was still extant in 1715 and was noted in the Amory Grant. He is earlier first recorded as being granted a forfeited house in Dublin for the sale of wine licences in 1661 and again granted wine licences in 1663.

The Mabbots owned lands from Talbot Street to Montgomery Street.

The street appears on John Rocque's map of Dublin of 1756 where it stretches from the Strand (now North Strand Road) to Great Martin's Lane (now Seán McDermott Street) and is intersected by World's End Lane (now Foley Street).

In the early 1800s, a number of architects and craftsmen worked from Mabbot Street, including one of James Gandon's principle assistant's in building the Custom House, Hugh Henry. Joyce wrote about the street as part of the Monto in Ulysses: "the Mabbot Street entrance of nighttown".

Later the street was intersected by newer streets such as Purdon Street, which has now disappeared and Mecklinburgh Street, which has now become Railway Street.

Following an effort to remove the brothels and other illegal activity from the area, the street was renamed Corporation Street around 1911, and redeveloped with new large public housing scheme called the Corporation Buildings (now demolished). The name was a reference to Dublin Corporation. The brothels were finally cleared from the area following police raids in 1925. Another public housing development on the corner of James Joyce Street and Railway Street, Liberty House, is still in use.

The street was later renamed James Joyce Street in 2001, though many of locals still call it Corporation Street. James Joyce Street was proposed by Fianna Fáil Councillor, Royston Brady. The renaming of the street took place when the Dublin County Council sold off publicly owned land, and the street was largely privately redeveloped.

=== Offices ===
The Companies Registration Office has one of its main offices at Bloom House, a reference to Leopold Bloom, at the junction of Gloucester Place Lower, James Joyce Street and Railway Street.

Independent House, the former offices of Independent News and Media is located at the junction with Talbot Street.

The Dublin City Council's arts office, The LAB, was opened on the corner of James Joyce Street and Foley Street in 2005. The LAB was built on the site of a pub owned by republican and MP, Phil Shanahan. The street is now flanked with office and apartment buildings, all four or five stories tall.

== Notable residents ==
- Patrick Byrne, architect, worked in 10 Mabbot Street.
- John B. Keane, architect, worked in 19 Mabbot Street.
- William Rooney, Irish nationalist, was born at lived in a tenement at 39 Mabbot Street.
