= Edward Smyth (sculptor) =

Irish sculptor (1749–1812)

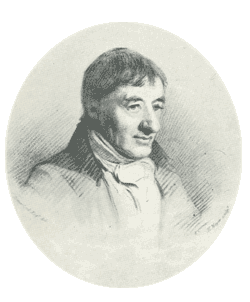
- Born: 1749; County Meath, Ireland
- Died: 2 August 1812 (aged 62–63); 36 Montgomery Street, Dublin
- Other name: Edward Smith

Edward Smyth (1749 – 2 August 1812) was an Irish sculptor, known as the "Phidias of Ireland".

== Early life ==
The son of a stonecutter, Smyth was born in County Meath, Ireland. His father moved to Dublin in 1750. Smyth attended the Dublin Society schools and was first apprenticed by Simon Vierpyl at Bachelor's Walk. He likely assisted Vierpyl with his work on the Royal Exchange. In 1772, his full-size statue model of Charles Lucas won a competition held by Dublin merchants, and was placed in the Royal Exchange in 1779. Despite this, he did not receive any important commissions for a number of years.

== Career ==
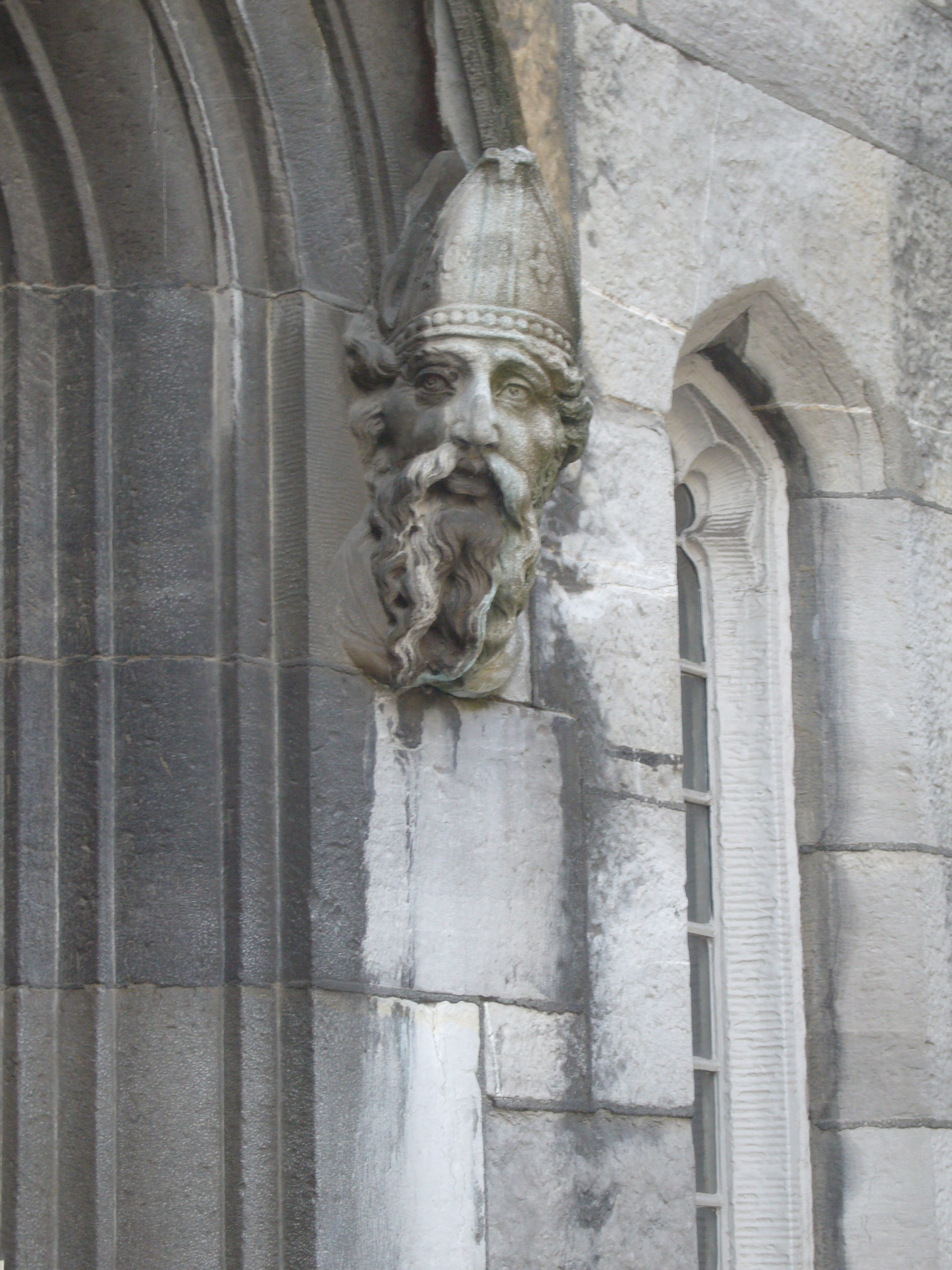
Carved head of saint on the Chapel Royal

From 1781, he was employed by Henry Darley, who was in turn an employee of James Gandon. Under Darley he worked on mantelpieces and decorative plastering. Gandon was greatly impressed with his work, and employed Smyth as the sculptor to the Custom House, as well as for all of his Dublin projects. These included the Four Courts, the Irish House of Lords, and King's Inns.

Among some of his most well known works are the riverine heads on Custom House, the 14 keystones on the ground floor windows and arches which symbolise the 13 principle rivers of Ireland and the Atlantic Ocean which were completed in 1784. The Irish currency commissioned in 1928 featured these heads in the designs. Smyth's work on the Four Courts was largely destroyed in 1922 at the beginning of the Irish Civil War.

During Gandon's renovation of the Rotunda, he sculpted an ox-head frieze beneath the roof. In 1787, Smyth completed statues to his own design above the Westmoreland Street entrance (the "Lords' Entrance" added by Gandon) of the Irish Houses of Parliament. In 1807, he carved the statues above the main entrance of the same building (which had been taken over by the Bank of Ireland) on College Green. These represent Hibernia flanked by Commerce and Fidelity.

Smyth was also employed by the architect Francis Johnston. He carved the heads on the exterior of Johnston's Chapel Royal in Dublin Castle until his death, whereupon his son John continued the work.

He also continued in portrait sculpture, including a statue of the lord lieutenant John Hobart Smyth and a bust of George III, a collaboration with his son. Smyth was the first Master of the Dublin Society School of Modelling and sculpture. He was a member of the Society of Artists of the City of Dublin, serving as vice-president before his death.

== Death and legacy ==
He died suddenly on 2 August 1812, at his home at 36 Montgomery Street, Dublin. He was buried in St Thomas's churchyard, later removed to Mount Jerome cemetery in 1925. His son, John, succeeded him as Master of Modelling at the Dublin School. Several of his works were renovated in the 20th century by his great-grandson, George Smyth.

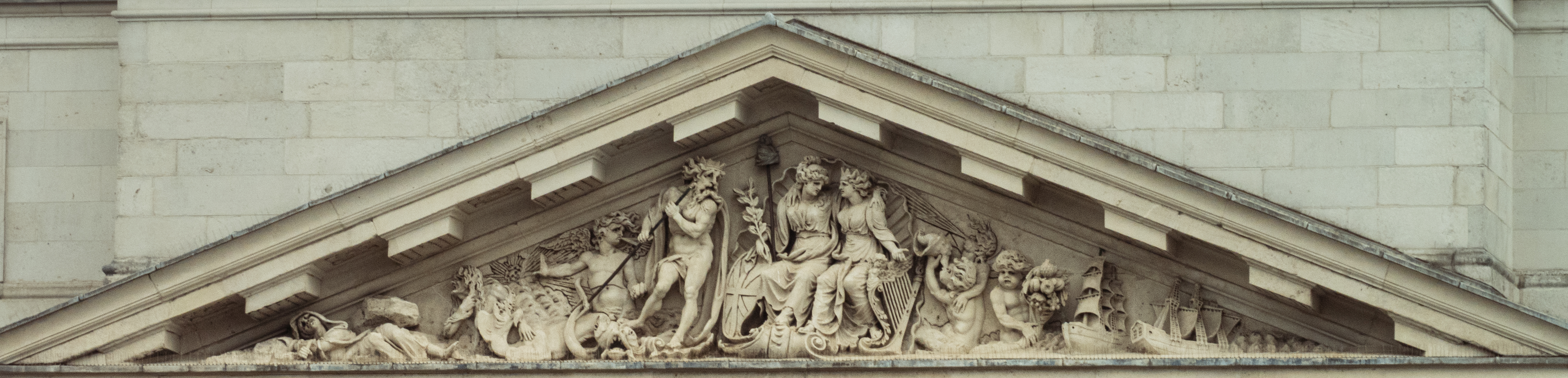
Sculpture in the tympanum of the Custom House, Dublin
