= Monto =

Historical red light district in Dublin, Ireland

Coordinates: 53°21′09″N 6°15′07″W

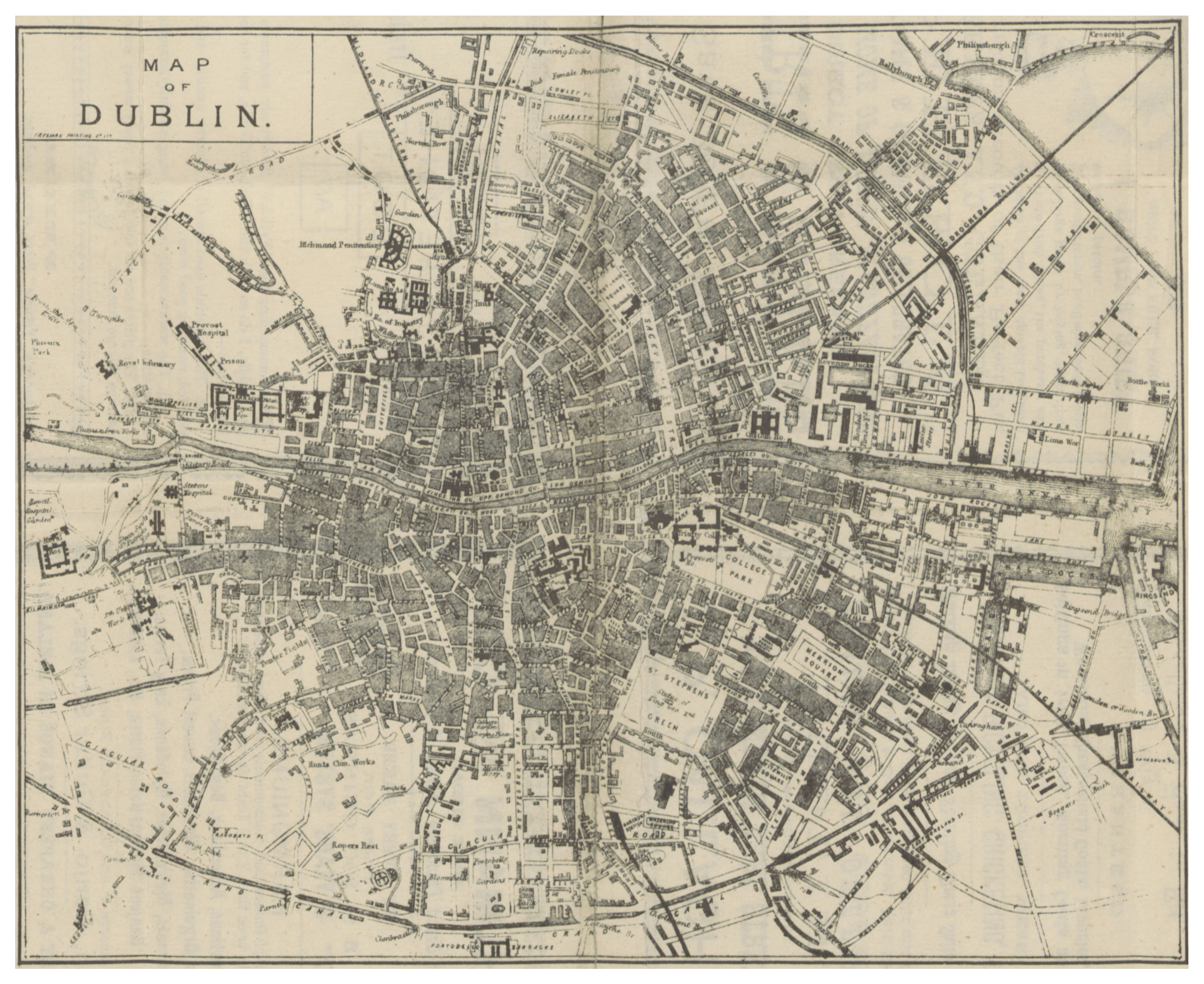
Map of Dublin, 1891; the Monto is circled.

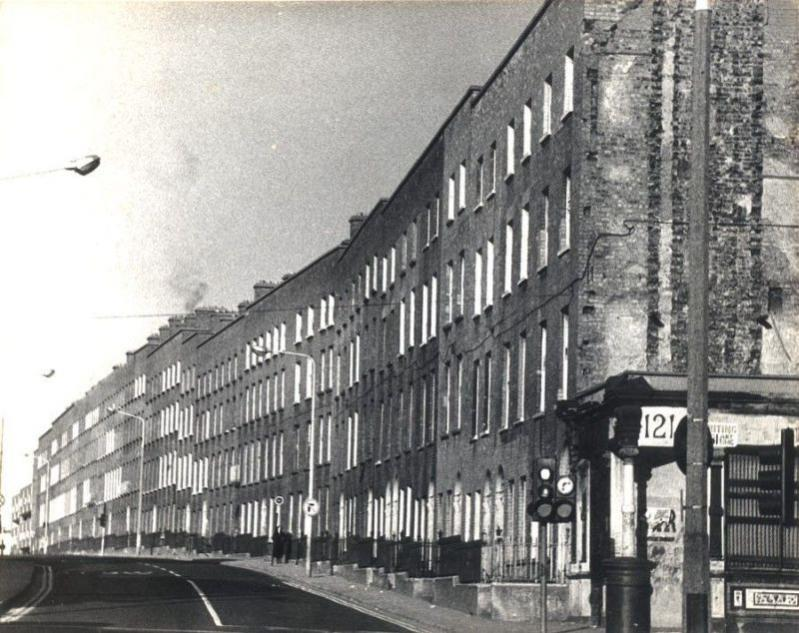
Georgian-era buildings in The Monto

Monto was the nickname for the one-time red light district in the northeast of Dublin, Ireland. The Monto was roughly the area bounded by Talbot Street, Amiens Street, Gardiner Street, Seán McDermott Street (formerly Gloucester Street) and Buckingham Street and included Mabbot Street and Mecklenburgh Street. The name is derived from Montgomery Street (now called Foley Street), which runs parallel to the lower end of Talbot Street towards what is now Connolly Station. Montgomery Street is believed to have been named after Elizabeth Montgomery, who was married to Luke Gardiner, 1st Viscount Mountjoy.

== History ==
In its heyday from the 1860s to the 1950s, there were anything up to 1,600 prostitutes working there at any one time, with all classes of customers catered for. Dublin was reputed to have the biggest red light district in Europe and its profits were aided by the enormous number of British Army garrisons in the city, notably the Royal Barracks (later Collins Barracks and now one of the locations of the National Museum of Ireland).

According to legend, King Edward VII of the United Kingdom lost his virginity in the Monto while still the Prince of Wales. Later, in the 1880s, the Prince, accompanied by his wife Princess Alexandra and their son Albert Victor, Duke of Clarence strolled unrecognised through the area, having slipped away from their bodyguards and walked through Dublin.

=== Residents ===
In Kevin Kearns' oral history collection Dublin Tenement Life, he comments that many of the prostitutes in the Monto were, like Philomena Lee, unwed mothers who had been disowned both by their families and by their babies' fathers. Although middle-class Dubliners viewed these women as 'whores', the impoverished but devoutly Catholic residents of Monto tenements referred to local prostitutes as "unfortunate girls", and understood that they had often turned to prostitution as a last resort. According to Kearns, "By all accounts, the girls were typically young, attractive, and known for their generosity, especially to slum children".

In an interview with Kearns, Mary Corbally, who grew up in a tenement on Corporation Street during the 1920s, recalled, "I don't feel any shame in coming from the Monto, but the reputation was there cause of the girls. We never heard the word 'Whores', never heard 'Prostitute'. Very rarely you'd hear of a brothel, it was a 'kip' and the madams we called them, 'kip-keepers'. But the girls were very good, they were generous. They were very fond of kids. If you went for a message for them you'd get a thruppence or a sixpence. If they seen a kid running around in his bare feet they'd bring him into Brett's and buy him a pair of runners... The girls were generous."

Billy Dunleavy, who grew up in the Monto before, during, and after the Irish War of Independence, later recalled, "It was a hard life for them girls. They were really all country girls that got into trouble and that's where they finished up. A girl (unwed) with a baby, she was in trouble... from farmers' sons. There was a convent around there and they were put up in there for twelve months with the nuns. They had a hard time. Scrubbing floors and everything else and the nuns standing over them. Oh, the country girls got a hell of a time of it, that's why all the girls was, 'on the town'. That's where they finished up. Now the madams had them dressed up in good new clothes, that was the attraction."

According to Kearns, "The madams, several of whom became legendary figures in Dublin folklore, were Dublin women. They were tough, shrewd businesswomen who ruled the roost in a strict maternal manner. They clothed their girls, housed them, and took a high percentage of their earnings. Many of the kip-houses also illegally sold drink which made it easier to part a man from his money... Several madams became quite wealthy, wore expensive jewels, owned cars, and even sent their children off to prestigious schools abroad. Some were possessive of their girls to the point of keeping them virtually housebound for periods."

According to Billy Dunleavy, however, "But when they got the money off the men and didn't give it up to the madams they took the clothes off them - stripped! They'd strip them, take all their clothes off them and put them up in the rooms in the houses. They had a bad occupation but they were very decent, very, very kind, the girls. You wouldn't hear them cursing and they might give the boy a penny or tuppence to buy sweets. Respectable girls. The wives around here would even say 'hello,' to them and be friendly enough. But we had a hospital here then called the Locke, over here on Townsend Street, and you know what they used to do with the girls (with sexual diseases)? Smother them. When they had syphilis and all... incurable! They used to be smothered. See, there was no such thing as pills at that time. They couldn't cure them. Smother them to take them out of their pain, or give them some kind of a needle. They were so far gone and at that time there was no cure. The hospital was built for that purpose. That's right. They wouldn't do them all, just an odd one. They'd be nearly dead before they'd do it."

In an interview with Kearns, Johnny Campbell, who had been a legendary Monto brawler in his youth, "Now there were also mobs fighting against one another, animal gangs. There were four gangs that used to go against one another - Stafford Street, Ash Street, Sheriff Street, and here, the Monto. Most of the animal gangs was dockers, nearly all of them. The dockers were the toughest men in Dublin. Ah, they were because they were going through the mill themselves with the big guns of coal and everything. And, oh, my God, they could put away maybe twenty pints... The coal dust and all. Now there could be a big melee on a Saturday night near Paddy Clare's or Jack Maher's (pubs). There could be twenty men fighting. They'd have razor blades and iron bars and knuckle-dusters and flick knives and hooks off the bales for the dock work. And you might see a fella taking off his belt and start swinging it. Like McCauley, he was a ringleader in the Monto, and he got his eyes taken out by a fella named Browne who hit him with a belt, took his eyes out. Browne got nine months."

Also according to Billy Dunleavy, "The kip houses were ordinary houses but you'd see the men going in and out, in and out. Oh, men'd come in with big cars and all. Big shots... businessmen, British soldiers, officers in the Army, British Generals. Big shots! It was safe enough. Men wouldn't stay all night. But some of the girls would rob them. Got 'em drunk. Take his trousers away from him and take his money. And the kip-houses had bouncers - whore's bullies we called them - and if a man didn't give up his money he'd get a hiding."

=== War of Independence ===
The Monto was also a major hive of IRA activity during the Irish War of Independence.

Billy Dunleavy further recalls, "The IRA were the best men we ever had at that time. The Tans used to go around in the tenders with a wire over the top and if it was going by up there in Talbot Street they'd (IRA) say, 'Get out of the way, quick!' and they'd throw a hand grenade into the car. Now Phil Shanahan, he owned a pub over there on the corner, he was a great man and he used to hide them after they'd been out on a job. He had cellars and all the IRA men used to go there and hide their stuff. But nobody knew who an IRA man was. Oh, no, you wouldn't know who an IRA man was around here at that time at all. They were all very secret. They had to be that way. Your neighbour could be an IRA man. On a Saturday morning, this big fella, he used to give information - he was an informer against the IRA - and two men came around that morning and riddled him in the public house, riddled him with bullets. The IRA killed him. But they were good men and they wouldn't kill any innocent people."

Following the Anglo-Irish Treaty (December 1921), the establishment of the Irish Free State (6 December 1922), and the withdrawal of the British Army garrison from Dublin, the financial viability of the kip-houses was severely damaged.

=== Campaign and Dublin Metropolitan Police raid ===
Between 1923 and 1925, Frank Duff, the founder of the Legion of Mary, and Fr. R.S. Devane launched a campaign, in defiance of the Crypto-Calvinist, or Jansenistic view by the Archbishop of Dublin and the middle class that fallen women should just be written off as whores, to empty the "kip-houses" and clean up The Monto. Similarly to St. Vitalis of Gaza, Duff and the Legion of Mary began a covert spiritual outreach to the "unfortunate girls" in the Monto and established the Sancta Maria hostel, a safe house for the growing number of prostitutes whom they helped to run away from their "kip keepers" and start a new life.

Duff also received the co-operation of the first Catholic Commissioner of the Dublin Metropolitan Police, former Irish Army General W.R.E. Murphy. The campaign ended with 120 arrests and Gen. Murphy announced the closure of all the remaining kip-houses following a DMP raid on 12 March 1925.

=== Post-1925 raid ===
However, kip-houses continued to exist in the Monto, long after the 1925 raid. This was enabled by both political corruption and bribery of the Irish Police, or Garda Síochána, well into the 1950s. According to Billy Dunleavy, "The Guards knew what was going on, but they couldn't do anything. But if the kip-houses were selling bottles of stout the Guards could get the bottles and break them up. See, there were manholes out there, where the water goes down. And they'd (kip-owners) put the bottles of stout down the manhole when the police'd be coming. Now your bottle of stout at that time was only around eight pence but if a man brought a girl to Becky Cooper's kip they'd be charged about a pound for that bottle. The police knew where the porter's be hid and they'd raid and take them up and break them."

These kip-houses included the "Cozy Kitchen" on North King Street and "Cafe Continental" on Bolton Street, both of which were run by legendary Dublin madam Dolly Fawcett and remained open, enabled by corruption in the Garda Síochána, well into the 1950s.

According to Northside resident Noelle Hughes, who knew Dolly Fawcett in her seventies, "The Cozy Kitchen" was located in the basement of a tenement house at 2 North King Street and was run by Dolly's son Stephen Fawcett until it closed down in 1957. Dolly's other son ran the Cafe Continental on Bolton Street. According to retired Guard Paddy Casey, the Cafe Continental was located next to the Bolton Street Technical School.

Hughes later recalled, "The girls would be around the place, at the counter, and a man would start chatting them up. They were mostly country girls up from the country, from seventeen into their thirties. They weren't high class prostitutes or anything like that, they were just ordinary commoners. I suppose they charged about two pounds. They'd bring the blokes off to a flat. Or take him around a laneway or around the back, somewhere like that. The whole neighbourhood know of this - the whole of Dublin knew about it cause the sailors off the ships used to go in there an awful lot. Men, they'd come from the docks and all over. It was mostly all outsiders cause the men in the tenements didn't have money."

Hughes continues, "And the police raided it a couple of times but they got backhands. Oh, there was backhands going on all the time, paying policemen off. And there was a bit of an argument a couple times about closing it down but nothing ever materialised of it. And then it eventually closed up and the Fawcetts went off to England."

== In popular culture ==
=== Folk songs ===
- The Irish folk song "Monto (Take Her Up to Monto)" was written by George Desmond Hodnett in 1958 and popularised by The Dubliners several years later. Irish singer Róisín Murphy named her 2016 album Take Her Up to Monto in reference to the song.
- Monto is also twice mentioned in the Irish folk song "Waxies' Dargle".
- It is referred to repeatedly in the Pete St. John song "Johnny McGory" (also popularised by The Dubliners).
- Monto, Frank Duff, and the L.O.M. are also mentioned in the Peter Yeates song "Honor Bright", the story of the 1925 murder of a prostitute (Lizzie O'Neil) who used the pseudonym "Honour Bright". The song is sung at the top of Act Two of The Ferryman by Jez Butterworth as the Carney boys come in from the harvest. In 2019 Pierce Turner included a version on his collection of traditional songs, Vinegar Hill.

=== Literature ===
- The Monto was immortalised as "Nighttown" in the "Circe" chapter of James Joyce's novel Ulysses, in which protagonists Leopold Bloom and Stephen Dedalus visit a kip-house together.
- Catherine Ann Cullen has written a poem, "Monto Cross", on the subject of the Monto.

== See also ==
- Prostitution in the Republic of Ireland
- History of Dublin
- Irish mob
