= John Foster (essayist) =

English Baptist minister and essayist

John Foster (1770–1843) was an English Baptist minister and essayist.

The son of a weaver, born in Halifax, Yorkshire, and educated for the ministry at the Baptist college in Bristol, Foster served as a minister for a number of years. Becoming a full-time writer, he contributed nearly 200 articles to the Eclectic Review. His works include Essays, in a Series of Letters (1804), and Essay on the Evils of Popular Ignorance (1820), in which he urged the necessity of a national system of education.

== Life ==
He was the eldest son of John Foster, a small farmer, weaver and Baptist, living at Wadsworth Lane in the parish of Halifax, Yorkshire, born 17 September 1770. From a young age he assisted his parents in spinning and weaving wool. At age 17 he became a member of the Baptist congregation at Hebden Bridge; and soon after was "set apart" as minister by a special religious service, and went to reside at Brearley Hall with John Fawcett, who was directing the studies of some Baptist students. After three years here he entered the Baptist College, Bristol, in September 1791, remaining there till May 1792, and then entering on the regular work of a preacher.

Foster first took charge of a small Baptist society at Newcastle-on-Tyne for three months in 1792. In the beginning of 1793 he went to Dublin to minister at a meeting-house in Swift's Alley. He lost his congregation, a recurring feature of his life. He went home, but returned to Dublin in 1795 to take charge of the classical and mathematical school of John Walker, which after eight or nine months he gave up as a failure. He was close to some of the extreme Dublin democrats, exposing him to the danger of imprisonment.

In February 1796, Foster returned once more to Wadsworth Lane, and remained there until early in 1797 he became minister of a general Baptist congregation at Chichester. In mid-1799 he moved to the house of an early friend, Joseph Hughes at Battersea, where he spent several months in preaching, and teaching twenty African boys whom Zachary Macaulay was training for mission work. In 1800 he took charge of a small congregation at Downend, near Bristol, and in February 1804 of one at Sheppard's Barton, Frome.

In summer 1806, Foster resigned the charge of the Sheppard's Barton congregation, troubled with a thyroid, and concentrated on writing. In May 1808 he married and went to live at Bourton in Gloucestershire. About a year after that his throat so far recovered as to allow him to resume occasional preaching, and towards the end of 1817 he again took charge of the congregation at Downend. In 1821 he gave it up and went to live at Stapleton, Gloucestershire. In 1822 he began to lecture fortnightly in Broadmead Chapel, Bristol; at the end of two years poor health forced him to make the lectures monthly, and in 1825, when Robert Hall began his ministry in Bristol, he dropped them.

Foster became involved in a controversy between the Serampore missionaries, Carey, Marshman, and Ward, and the committee of the Baptist Missionary Society, strongly siding with the missionaries. In 1836, his health began to give way, and his lungs became diseased. On 24 September 1843 he took to his room, and on Sunday morning, 15 October, he was found dead in bed. He was buried in the burial-ground attached to the Downend Baptist chapel.

== Publications ==
- Life and Correspondence, edited by Ryland (London, 1846; republished in Bohn's Library, 1852)

Foster's Essays were published in 1805. They originated in conversations with Maria Snooke, whom he had first met at Battersea, and who later became his wife, and were addressed to her. An introductory letter, dated "Near Bristol, 30 Aug. 1804", mentions reasons for writing them. The book contained four essays: "On a Man's Writing Memoirs of Himself", "On Decision of Character", "On the Application of the Epithet Romantic", and "On Some of the Causes by which Evangelical Religion has been rendered less acceptable to Persons of Cultivated Taste". In about four months a second edition was called for, and a third was published in 1806.

Foster became a regular contributor to the Eclectic Review, his first article, a review of Sir John Carr's Stranger in Ireland, appearing in November 1806. He continued to write for it till 1839, his last piece being published in July of that year. Altogether he contributed 184 articles, a number of which were republished in his Contributions, Biographical, Literary, and Philosophical, to the "Eclectic Review" (2 vols. London, 1844).

In 1818, while at Downend, Foster published his Discourse on Missions. Two volumes of his Broadmead Chapel lectures were published. In 1820, he published his essay On the Evils of Popular Ignorance, based on a sermon preached on behalf of the British and Foreign School Society in 1818. It speedily went into a second edition, heavily revised. In 1825 he completed an introductory essay to Philip Doddridge's Rise and Progress of Religion for the series of Select Christian Authors published by William Collins of Glasgow. The period of the missionary controversy brought Introductory Observations to Dr. Marshman's Statement (London, 1828).

== Family ==
Foster married Maria Snooke in 1808. His only son died, after a lingering illness, in 1826. His wife fell into consumption, and after years of declining health died in 1832.

== Notes ==
Attribution

This article incorporates text from a publication now in the public domain: Stephen, Leslie, ed. (1889). "Foster, John (1770-1843)". Dictionary of National Biography. Vol. 20. London: Smith, Elder & Co.
