= John Walker (vaccinator) =

John Walker (1759–1830) was an English educational writer, medical doctor, and advocate of vaccination.

== Early life ==
Born at Cockermouth in Cumberland on 31 July 1759, Walker was the son of a smith and ironmonger there. He was educated at Cockermouth grammar school, and then followed his father's occupation of blacksmith. In 1779 he went to Dublin, and worked for an artist named Esdale. Between 1780 and 1783 he contributed engraved plates to Joseph Walker's Hibernian Magazine.

Influenced by Quaker ideas, though never admitted to the Society of Friends, Walker set up a school in Usher's Island, Dublin, in 1784, based on treating his pupils kindly. He journeyed through much of England and Ireland in 1793, returning to Dublin in the following year. Leaving Dublin for London, he made over his school to his friend John Foster.

Walker became a medical student at Guy's Hospital. In 1797 he visited Paris, where he was on good terms with James Napper Tandy, Thomas Paine, and Thomas Muir. From Paris he went to the University of Leyden, and graduated M.D. in 1799. He passed the winter in Edinburgh, and in 1800 was at Stonehouse in Gloucestershire, staying with a Dr. Marshall.

== Vaccinator ==
Marshall invited Walker to Naples to help introduce vaccination, and he left England in June 1800. He then accompanied Sir Ralph Abercromby on his Egyptian expedition. Returning to London in 1802, Walker on 12 August started to recommence a course of public vaccination. The Jennerian Society was formed at the end of the year, and early in 1803 he was elected resident inoculator at the central house of the society in Salisbury Square.

Walker, however, did not operate within the principles set down by Edward Jenner, and Jenner insisted he should be dismissed. Walker in consequence resigned the post on 8 August 1806, amid a public row. On 25 August the London Vaccine Institution was formed, in which Walker was appointed to a post similar to one which he had resigned, and continued to practise in Salisbury Court. After the establishment of the national vaccine board by the government, the Jennerian Society, at a low ebb, was amalgamated with the London Vaccine Institution in 1813, and Jenner was elected president of the new society, with Walker as director, an office which he held until his death.

Walker was admitted a licentiate of the College of Physicians on 30 September 1812. During the latter part of his life he worked on vaccination, six days a week at the various stations of the society. He boasted that he had vaccinated more than 100,000 persons.

Walker died in London on 23 June 1830. He was an abolitionistl, and campaigned against sati. He had married at Glasgow on 23 October 1799. A biography was written by John Epps, to help support his widow.

== Works ==
In 1788 Walker published in London Elements of Geography and of Natural and Civil History, which reached a third edition in 1800. His Universal Gazetteer (London) appeared in 1795, reaching a sixth edition in 1815. He wrote also:

- On the Necessity for contracting Cavities between the Venous Trunks and the Ventricles of the Heart, Edinburgh, 1799.
- Fragments of Letters and other Papers written in different parts of Europe and in the Mediterranean, London, 1802.

He translated from the French the Manual of the Theophilanthropes, or Adorers of God and Friends of Man, London, 1797.

== Notes ==
Attribution

This article incorporates text from a publication now in the public domain: Lee, Sidney, ed. (1899). "Walker, John (1759-1830)". Dictionary of National Biography. Vol. 59. London: Smith, Elder & Co.
