= Seán McDermott Street =

Street in central Dublin, Ireland

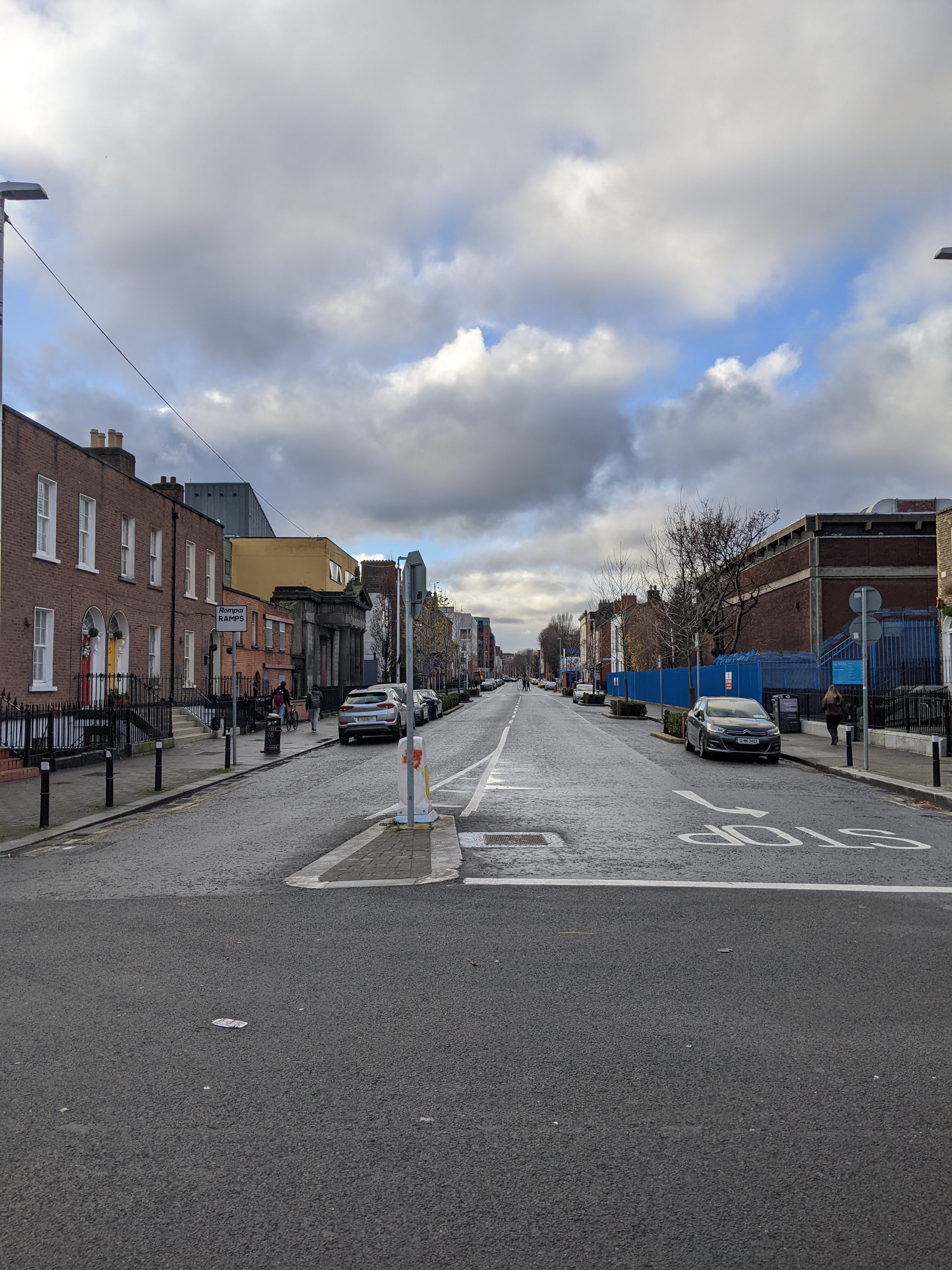
- View of Seán McDermott Street looking west at the junction with Buckingham Street

- Location within Central Dublin
- Native name: Sráid Sheáin Mhic Dhiarmada (Irish)
- Former name: Gloucester Street (1764–1933)
- Namesake: Seán Mac Diarmada
- Length: 530 m (1,740 ft)
- Width: 19 metres (62 ft)
- Location: Dublin, Ireland
- Postal code: D01
- Coordinates: 53°21′13″N 6°15′13″W
- west end: Cumberland Street Upper, Cathal Brugha Street, Champions Avenue
- Major junctions: Gardiner Street, James Joyce Street
- east end: Buckingham Street, Killarney Street

Construction
- Construction start: early 18th century

Other
- Known for: Monto, Scots Presbyterian Church, Matt Talbot

Seán McDermott Street (Irish: Sráid Sheáin Mhic Dhiarmada) is a street in northeast Dublin, Ireland. It is divided into Seán McDermott Street Lower (east end) and Seán McDermott Street Upper (west end).

Located in the north inner city, it runs west–east as an extension of Cathal Brugha Street, for about 530 metres (1/3 mile) until it intersects with Buckingham Street. Pope John Paul II visited Sean McDermott St in 1979.

== History ==
The street appears as open fields on John Rocque's map of Dublin of 1756-62.

In 1764 the street named Gloucester Street for Prince William Henry, Duke of Gloucester and Edinburgh, brother of King George III. Many fine Georgian townhouses were built, but they were allowed to degrade into tenements by 1900 with most being demolished during the 20th century.

In the 1860s–1920s, Gloucester Street was the northern end of the notorious Monto red-light district, where thousands of prostitutes lived and worked.

Its intersection with Gloucester Place was known as the Gloucester Diamond, and was a centre for street football in the mid-20th century. The Gloucester Diamond is mentioned in Pete St. John's song "Johnny McGory", about a First World War veteran who returns to Dublin having lost a leg.

An IRA safe house was located at 36 Gloucester Street Lower during the Irish War of Independence; Conor Clune, Dick McKee and Sean Fitzpatrick were arrested there on 21 November 1920, the day before Bloody Sunday.

In 1933 the street was renamed for Seán Mac Diarmada (McDermott, 1883–1916), an executed leader of the Easter Rising. The area was plagued by juvenile crime, including by the so-called "animal gangs." In 1943–53, over 500 new homes were provided in the area by reconditioning. Nevertheless, the area continued to be plagued by poverty and crime, with Michael Keating criticising the squalor of the area in the late 1970s.

A Magdalene laundry for unwed mothers, including "repentant" prostitutes, opened in 1887 and did not close until 1996.

A temporary Catholic chapel was built in 1915; it was replaced by the Romanesque Revival Church of Our Lady of Lourdes in 1954. The church is known for its association with the ascetic Matt Talbot (1856–1925), whose remains were translated to the church in 1972. Pope John Paul II visited the street in 1979, but did not enter the shrine. A banner was erected reading "John Paul Rules OK".

Today, the Irish headquarters of the Society of Saint Vincent de Paul are located on Seán McDermott Street as well as a Simon Community hostel which is housed in the former carpenters' asylum, an impressive regency style former guildhall at number 35.

There is also a large public swimming pool.

== Built heritage ==
Since the establishment of the street, there have been numerous notable buildings, some of which have now been demolished while others are in a state of dereliction.

=== Scots Presbyterian Church ===
The Scots Presbyterian Church is a notable Greek-revival style church built on the street in 1846; it was later a Salvation Army building and a grain store and the façade of the building remains a landmark on the street as of 2021.

=== Gloucester Terrace ===
Gloucester Terrace was a Regency terrace of six houses constructed around 1831 to a design of John Thomas Papworth with a unified pediment located at what was later referred to as 45 to 50 Lower Seán MacDermott Street but originally forming a portion of Gloucester Street. The houses were demolished in the 1950s to be replaced with an ESB substation and other public buildings.

== Gallery ==
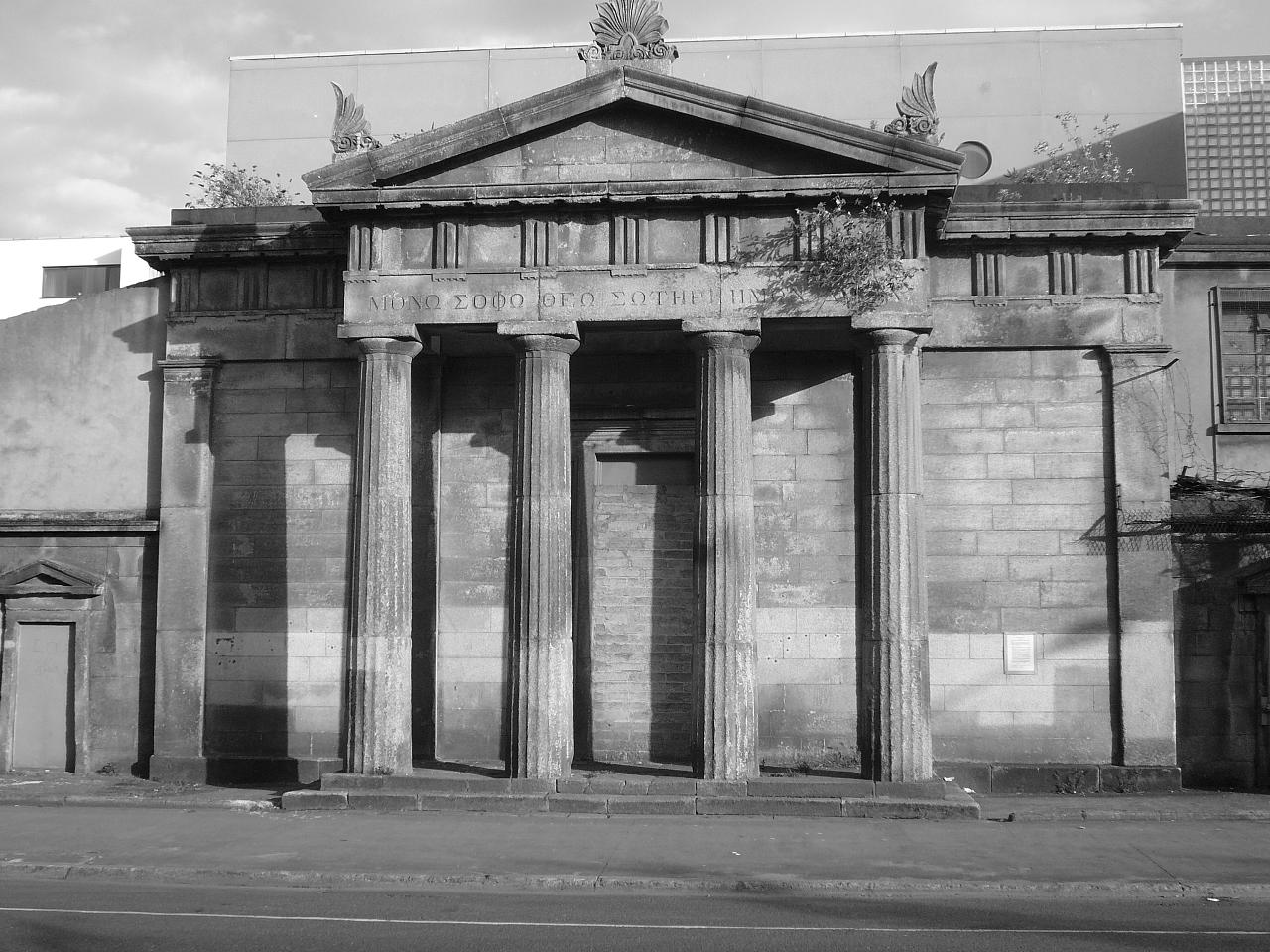
Facade of the Scots Presbyterian Church

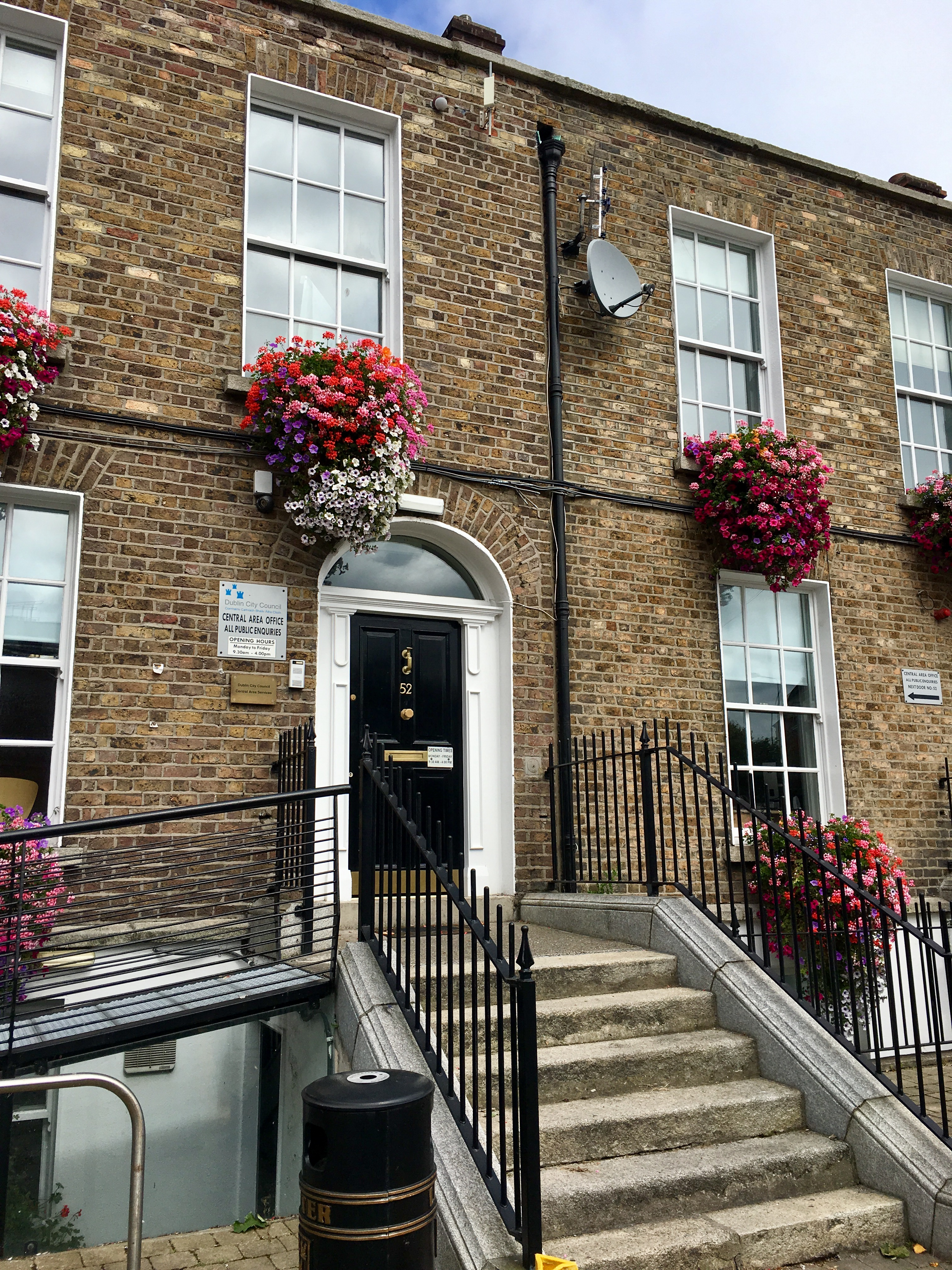
Dublin City Council offices, 52 Seán McDermott Street Lower

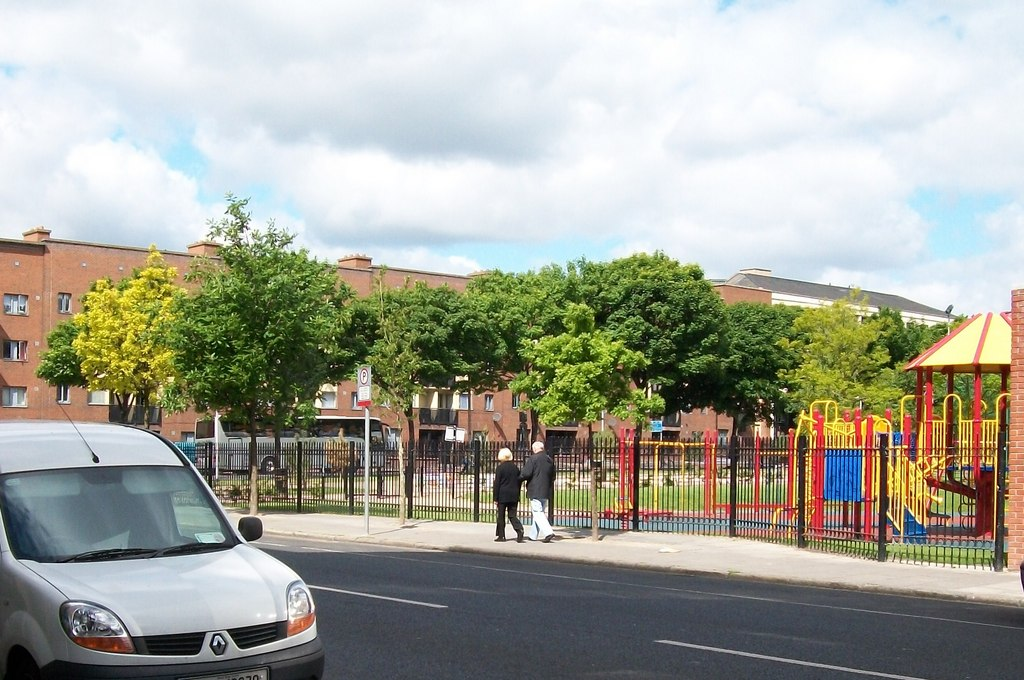
Playground on Seán McDermott Street

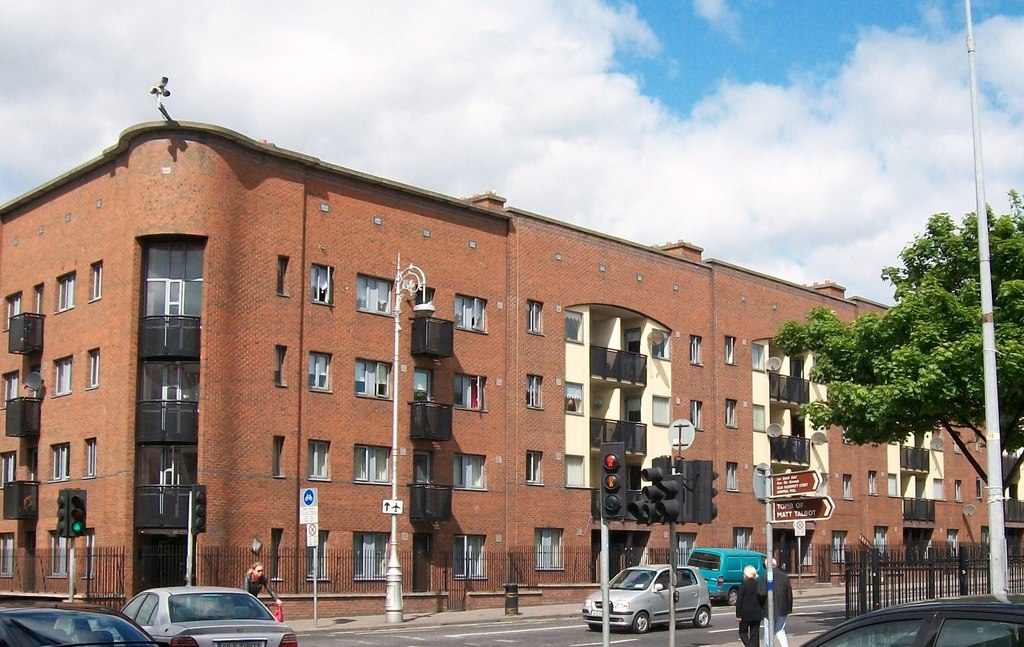
Multi-storey flats on the corner of Seán McDermott Street Upper and Lower Gardiner Street

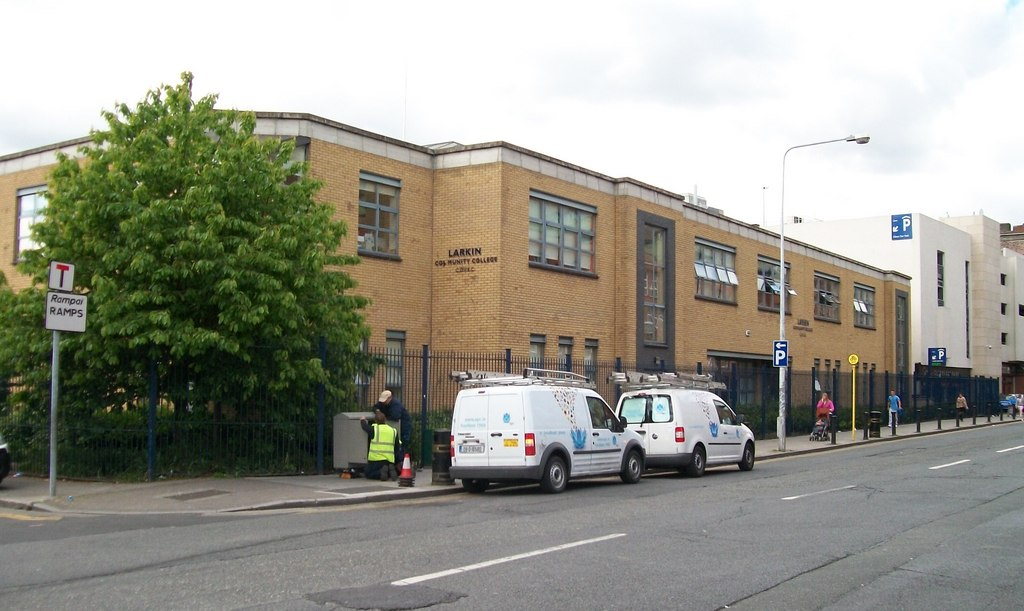
Larkin Community College

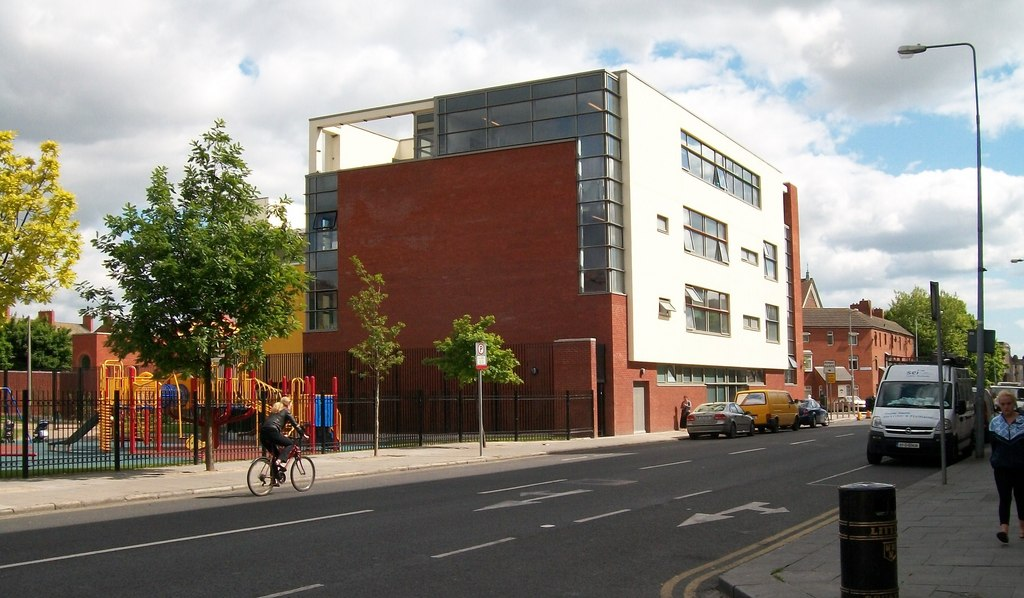
A rear view of Lourdes Parish Schools

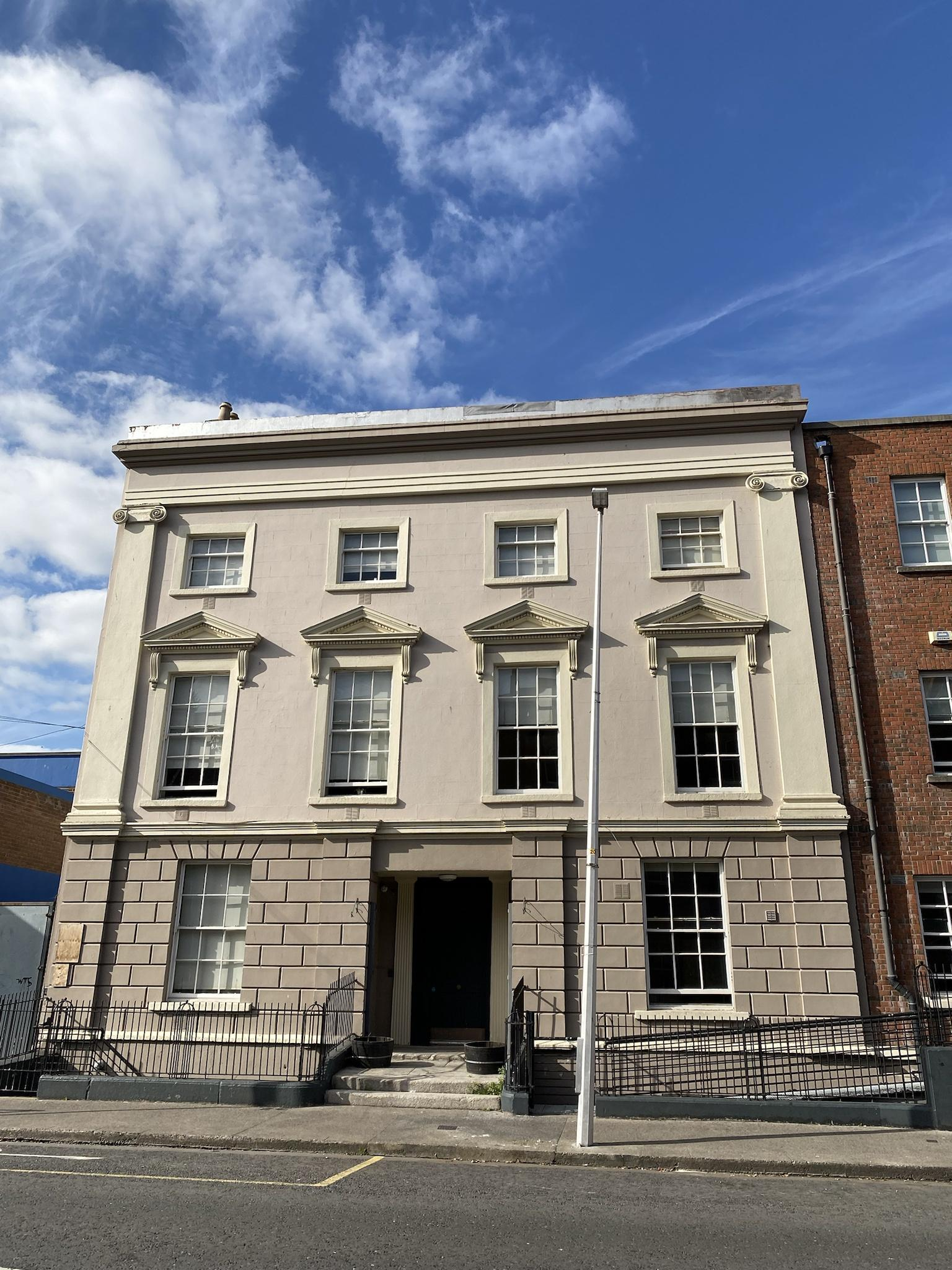
Carpenters' Asylum

== See also ==
- List of streets and squares in Dublin
