= James Solas Dodd =

English surgeon, lecturer, and actor

- Born: 1721; London
- Died: 1805 (aged 83–84); Dublin
- Occupations: Surgeon, lecturer, and actor

James Solas Dodd (1721–1805) was an English surgeon, lecturer, and actor.

== Biography ==
Dodd was born in London in 1721. His maternal grandfather, John Dodd, who had been ‘master in the navy during Queen Anne's wars,’ was in 1719 commander of the St. Quintin, a merchantman trading from London to Barcelona. At Barcelona he became acquainted with a young Spanish officer named Don Jago Mendozo Vasconcellos de Solis, a younger brother of Don Antonio de Solis, author of ‘Historia de la Conquista de Mexico.’ Don Jago having had a duel with the son of the governor of Barcelona, and left him for dead, took shelter in Captain Dodd's ship, and sailed in it for London that very evening. Don Jago put up at Captain Dodd's house ‘whilst his pardon was soliciting from the king of Spain,’ and in 1720 married Miss Rebecca Dodd, daughter of his host. On his marriage Don Jago took the name of Dodd in order to perpetuate to his issue a small estate near Newcastle-upon-Tyne. His only child was baptised James Solis, after his family, but by the error of the parish clerk the name was entered on the register as James Solas, which mode of spelling Dodd afterwards adopted. In 1727 Don Jago died in London, having failed to reconcile his father, Don Gaspard de Solis, to his marriage with a Protestant, by which he lost his patrimony and commission. Young Dodd received a good education, it being his mother's wish that he should take orders, but ‘on some family reasons’ he was ultimately put apprentice to John Hills, a surgeon practising in the Minories, London, with whom he continued seven years. In 1745 he entered the navy as surgeon's mate of the Blenheim hospital-ship, and served till the end of the war in the Devonshire, a ship of sixty-six guns, and the St. Albans. He continued for some months after the peace in the St. Albans, it being then stationed at Plymouth as a guardship. He took up his diploma as a member of the Corporation of Surgeons, London, in 1751, and practised in Gough Square, Fleet Street, and afterwards in Suffolk Street, Haymarket. In 1752 he commenced authorship with ‘An Essay towards a Natural History of the Herring,’ 8vo, London, written to promote the industry as advocated by the Society of the Free British Fishery. He was indebted to Dr. Thomas Birch for assistance in his literary projects (cf. his letter to Birch, dated 14 April 1752, in Addit. MS. 4305, f. 2). The next year he took part in the great Canning controversy by publishing ‘A Physical Account of the Case of Elizabeth Canning, with an Enquiry into the probability of her subsisting in the manner therein asserted,’ &c., 8vo, London, 1753, in which he argues strongly for the truth of the girl's story. Towards the close of January 1754, ‘on account of some deaths in his family,’ Dodd set out for the continent, returning in May following. In 1759 he again entered the navy; ‘came as supernumerary in the Sheerness from Leghorn to Gibraltar;’ there went on board the Prince, and continued in her till June 1762. In the same year he qualified at Surgeons' Hall as master-surgeon of any ship of the first rate, and was warranted for the Hawke, in which he served till she was paid off at the peace, February 1763. He then settled once more in London, ‘chiefly,’ as he says, ‘in the literary line.’ One of these literary undertakings was a series of lectures first delivered in 1766 in the great room of Exeter Exchange, and afterwards published with the title ‘A Satyrical Lecture on Hearts, to which is added a Critical Dissertation on Noses,’ 8vo, London, 1767 (second edition the same year). In his preface Dodd disclaimed all notion of having imitated G. A. Stevens's lectures on heads, asserting ‘that both the heads and hearts were first thought on in consequence of the beau and coquette in the “Spectator.”’ The reviewer of the book in the ‘Gentleman's Magazine’ (xxxvii. 73–4) attributes to Dodd the authorship of a periodical essay published some years before under the title of ‘The Scourge.’ On 7 February 1767 the house in which he lodged, adjoining the gateway of the Saracen's Head inn on Snow Hill, suddenly fell to the ground, but he and his family escaped with the loss only of their belongings (ib. xxxvii. 92). His wife's head being affected by this accident, Dodd left London and went to Bath and Bristol for her recovery; thence he wandered to Ireland, where he ‘followed his business and literary employments’ in Dublin. In March 1779 he was ‘invited’ to return to London. He brought with him a play founded on ‘Le Naufrage’ of J. de Lafont, which held the boards at Covent Garden for exactly one night. It was published the same year as ‘Gallic Gratitude; or, the Frenchman in India,’ a comedy in two acts, 8vo, London, 1779, and was reissued as having been acted in Dublin, with a new title-page, ‘The Funeral Pile,’ 12mo, Dublin, 1799 (Baker, Biographia Dramatica, ed. 1812, i. 191, ii. 254, 255). At the end of the first issue are some ‘Critical Remarks on Mrs. Jackson's Performance of Lady Randolph in the Tragedy of “Douglas,” &c.’ Another undertaking was ‘The Ancient and Modern History of Gibraltar. … With an accurate Journal of the Siege … by the Spaniards … 1727, translated from the original Spanish, published by authority at Madrid,’ 8vo, London, 1781. In 1781 he became intimate with a Major John Savage, who styled himself Baron Weildmester, and had, he alleged, pressing claims on Lord North. This adventurer, on undertaking to defray all expenses, induced Dodd to embark with his family with him for Russia, where, he said, he had a plan to propose from a foreign power to the empress to enter into a treaty of alliance, and thus he and Dodd would be sent as ambassadors; ‘that Mrs. Dodd, &c. should remain under the czarina's protection, and that on their return they would be decorated with the order of St. Catherine & have 1,000l. a year pension.’ Charmed with this proposal, Dodd cheerfully bore the expense until Riga was reached, where he learned Savage's true character. Accordingly, he was glad to take passage in a vessel bound to Bowness on the Firth of Forth. He landed at Leith in December 1781 almost destitute of means. In the following year he appeared at Edinburgh as actor and lecturer. David Stewart Erskine, eleventh earl of Buchan, was interested in him, and among Buchan's manuscripts is a paper in Dodd's handwriting relating the story of his career from his earliest years. A verbatim transcript is given in ‘Notes and Queries,’ 6th ser. vii. 483–4. He died in Mecklenburgh Street, Dublin, in the spring of 1805, aged 84, ‘a gentleman of amiable and entertaining manners, whose converse with the literary world and fund of anecdote rendered his company extremely agreeable.’ In the obituaries of Walker's ‘Hibernian Magazine,’ 1805, p. 256, and of the ‘Gentleman's Magazine,’ vol. lxxv. pt. i. p. 388, his age is foolishly asserted to have been 104. According to the ‘European Magazine,’ xlvii. 402, Dodd ‘was a great frequenter of the disputing societies and a president of one of them.’
