= James Carlile =

Scottish clergyman

Reverend James Carlile
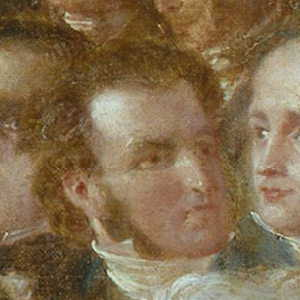
- In 1840
- Born: 5 February 1784; Paisley
- Died: 1854 (aged 69–70); Dublin
- Resting place: Birr
- Education: Paisley Grammar School, University of Glasgow and University of Edinburgh
- Occupations: Clergyman, writer
- Spouse: Jane Wren (of Kendal
- Children: two sons

James Carlile (1784–1854) was a Scottish clergyman from Paisley. He was a joint minister of a Scots church in Dublin and an Irish commissioner of education. He introduced a different style of education in Ireland whereby children of different denominations could go to the same school.

== Biography ==
Carlile was born in Paisley. He was educated at Paisley Grammar School and then studied divinity at the universities in Glasgow and Edinburgh. He was licensed to preach in 1811 by the Paisley Presbyterians and in 1815 at the "Scots' Church", Mary's Abbey, Capel Street, Dublin.

On 1 July 1813 he published the constitution of a Purgatorian Society, which was an unusual concept. The constitution took a tract from the Bible as their guide. They agreed to pay one penny a week, and in exchange prayers would be offered for their souls at 10 a.m. every month. The tract they chose was It is therefore a holy and wholesome thought to pray for the dead that they may be loosed from their sins. The idea was that members would spend less time in Purgatory. The rules of the society laid down that all members would be entitled to a mass in their honour assuming that they had a natural death and there were no fees owing to the society.

In 1817 he made an important speech which changed Irish church policy.

"Let us tell our people that we will never permit his Majesty's bounty to operate as a bribe to induce us to desert what we believe ... or whether we deserve that Lord Castlereagh should drive his chariot into the midst of us, and tread us down as the offal of the streets"

This speech was in protest of Lord Castlereagh's suggestion that the synod should recognise the Belfast Academical Institution instead of a Scottish university to educate their ministers.

Carlile was moderator of the synod of Ulster in 1825.

== Education policy ==
Carlile was appointed resident commissioner to the new Irish board of national education in 1831. He devised and introduced a radical system of education. It was based on the idea of both Protestant and Catholic children being educated together, except for separate religious education. He sat on the school board with the Anglican Archbishop Richard Whately and the Roman Catholic Archbishop Daniel Murray. The two Dublin archbishops both regarded Carlile highly despite the objections they all received from less radical wings of both denominations. In 1839 he resigned, but by this time he had handled the main arguments, commissioned new textbooks and a new Dublin teacher training college where he had served as a professor. The educational reforms are seen as divisive. The Catholic encyclopaedia describes how the reform was "left in the hands of the Protestant Archbishop of Dublin (Dr. Whately) and his Presbyterian ally, Rev. James Carlile, both of whom were unceasing in unscrupulous efforts to make it an engine of attack on the Catholic faith of the Irish people."

A geography course written by Carlile describes a tour of the world including England, Ireland, Wales and Scotland which are the "British Empire in Europe". The Welsh are so industrious that they "carry their knitting wherever they go", whereas Dublin used to have more factories, but the workers refused to lower their wages to a level that their masters could afford.

== Home missionary ==
In 1839 he successfully persuaded his church to allow him to become their missionary to a church in Birr. This church, led by their minister, had left the Roman Catholic Church and had applied to join the Presbyterians. Carlile served in this role of missionary, but continued with other interests. Carlile journeyed to London to attend the World Anti-Slavery Convention on 12 June 1840. The picture above shows him in a painting made to commemorate the event which attracted delegates from America, France, Haiti, Australia, Ireland, Jamaica and Barbados.

In 1845 Carlile was moderator of the church's general assembly and in the same year he was awarded a Doctorate in Divinity from Glasgow University. Carlile retired to Dublin in 1852 after his wife, Jane, died in Birr. He died at his home in Rathmines, on 31 March 1854. A church service in Dublin was followed by a burial in Birr.

His sister Elizabeth married Nathaniel Stevenson, a Glasgow businessman involved with cotton.

== Works ==
- Carlie, James (1815). Examination of Arguments for Roman Catholic Episcopacy. Dublin.
- Sermons on Faith and Repentance, London, 1821.
- Carlile, James (1823). The Old Doctrine of Faith Asserted in Opposition to Certain Modern Innovations. London: F. Westley.
- The Apocryphal Controversy summed up, Glasgow, 1827.
- On the Constitution of the Primitive Churches, Dublin, 1831.
- Letters on the Divine Origin and Authority of Scripture, 2 vols., London, 1833.
- On the First and Second Advents, Edinburgh, 1848.
- Fruit gathered from among Roman Catholics in Ireland, London, 1848.
- The Papal Invasion: how to repel it, London, 1850.
- Manual of the Anatomy and Physiology of the Human Mind, London, 1851.
- Station and Occupation of Saints in Final Glory, London, 1854.

Presbyterian Church titles
Preceded by John Brown (1844)	Moderator of the Presbyterian Church in Ireland; 1845	Succeeded by James Morgan (1846)
