= Ormond Quay Presbyterian church =

Former church in Dublin, Ireland

Coordinates: 53°20′38″N 6°16′31″W

Ormond Quay Presbyterian Church
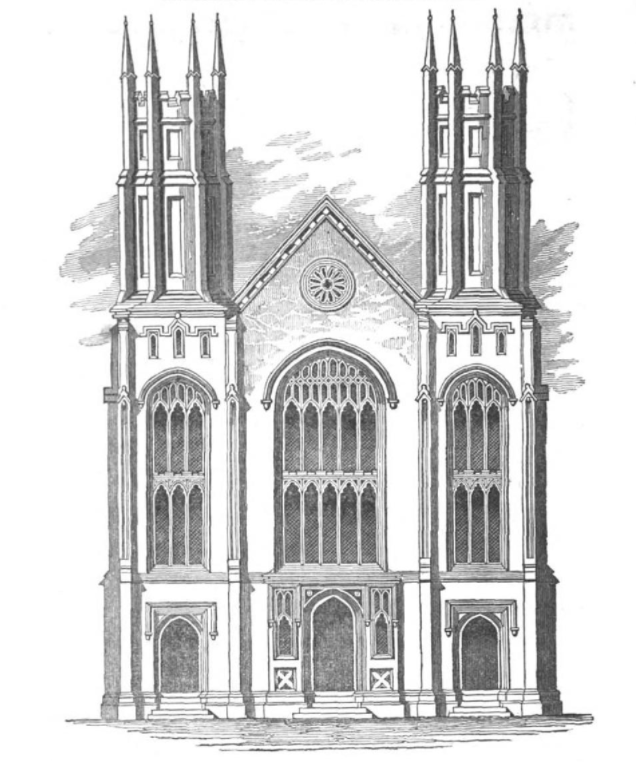
- Illustration of the church in 1870
- Ormond Quay Presbyterian Church
- Location: Ormond Quay, Dublin
- Country: Ireland
- Denomination: Presbyterian

History
- Founded: 1847

Architecture
- Architect: Edward P. Gribbon

Ormond Quay Presbyterian Church is a former church located at Ormond Quay, Dublin.

There was a congregation of Presbyterians, many of Scottish extraction, in Dublin around Ormond Quay since the early 18th century, a Mr. Arbuckle being the first minister. It was first established in 1707 in Ushers Quay (on a plot of land called Usher's Garden) after a split within the congregation of Bull Alley. The congregation from the Plunket Street Meeting House(Presbyterian church) merged with Usher's Quay in 1844.

The construction of the Ormond Quay church was financed by a bequest from a widow, Martha Maria Magee (née Stewart) from Lurgan, County Armagh, who had moved to Dublin. She had inherited a large sum of money from her brothers, both soldiers. The church was designed by architect Edward P. Gribbon and erected in 1847. It was enlarged to the design of the same architect in 1859.

The church was in charge of the Presbyterian Female Orphan School, 77 Upper Dorset Street, Dublin, where its pastor and members sat on its board of governors.

In 1938 the Ormond Quay congregation merged with the other Scots Presbyterian Church congregation on Abbey Street. Ormond Quay became the home of the Dublin City Mission of the Presbyterian Church in Ireland until the late 1940s when it was acquired by Dublin Corporation under compulsory purchase.

In the 1960s the church building was damaged by fire, and the upper section was removed by Dublin Corporation. In 1989 the ground floor facade was incorporated into a new office building erected on the site called Grattan Bridge House at 3 Ormond Quay Upper.

In 2003, the Ormond Quay and Scots Church voted to merge with the Clontarf Presbyterian Church, sanctioned by the General Assembly to create the Clontarf & Scots Presbyterian Church, and they moved to Clontarf, Dublin.

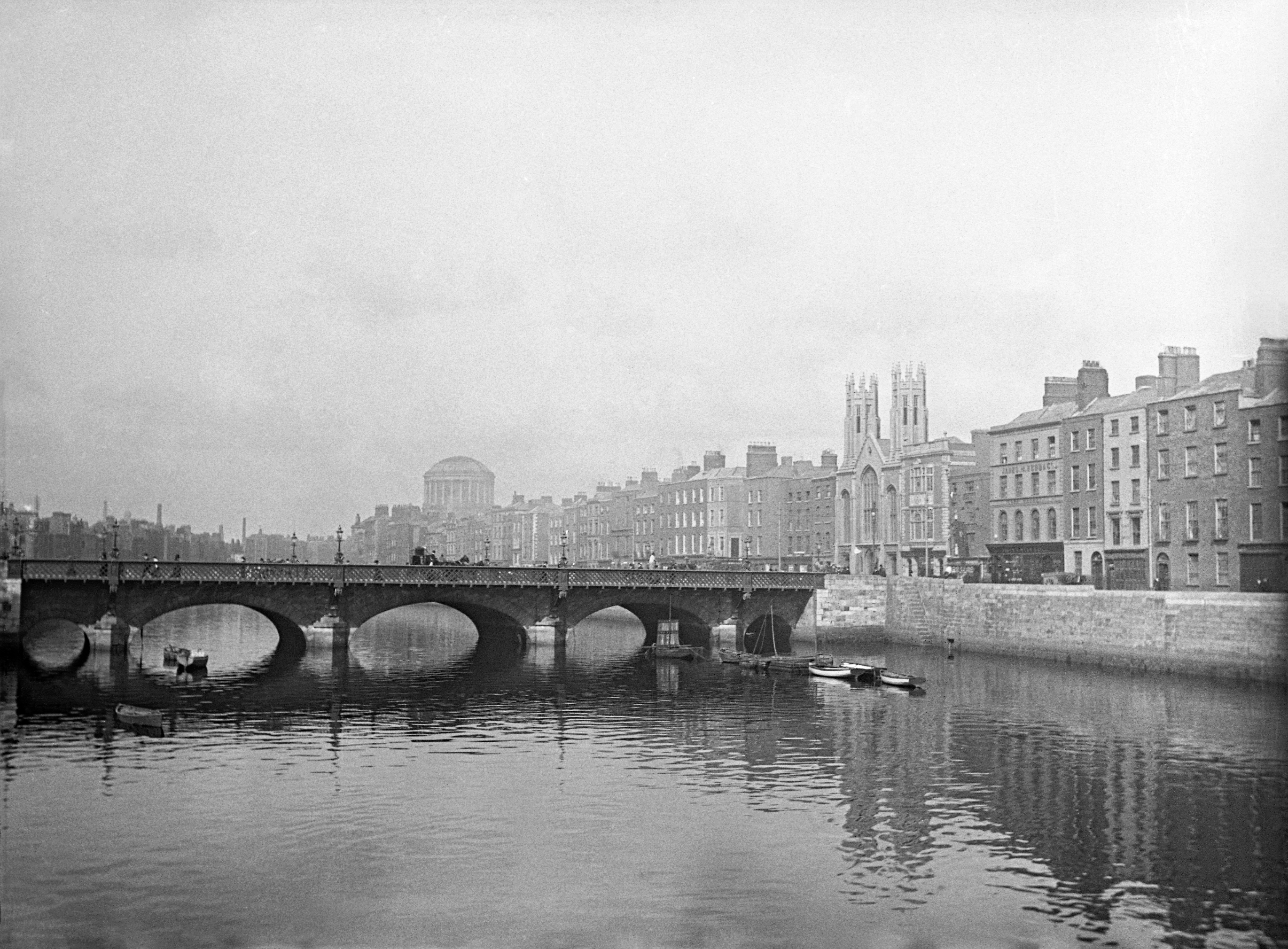
The church beyond Grattan bridge on the River Liffey c. 1898

== Pastors ==
- Rev. Henry Hook
- 1713-1721 - Rev. James Arbuckle
- 1721-1723 - Rev. William Gray
- 1734 1754 - Rev. Robert McMaster, moderator of Synod of Ulster in 1739
- 1744-1754 - Rev. William McBeath
- 1756-1772 - Rev. Thomas Vance
- 1760-1762 - Rev. Robert Nichol
- 1763-1783 - Rev. James Caldwell (incorporated the Plunket Street Congregation in Ushers Quay)
- 1780-1787 - Rev. William Wilson
- 1780-1824 - Rev. Hugh Moore, died 1824 after many years of illness and unable to officiate.
- 1808-1813 - Rev. W. D. H. McEwen (1787-1828)
- 1815-1835 - Rev. Samuel Simpson, sole minister form 1824
- 1835-1858 - Rev. Richard Dill (1807–58), overseen the transfer to Ormond Quay, and was executor of the will Martha Magee which led to the establishment of Magee College.
- 1859-1871 - Rev. Dr. John James Black
- 1873-1880 - Rev. Jame Cargin
- 1880- - Rev. Samuel Prenter
