= White Conduit House =

Former leisure resort in London

Coordinates: 51°32′05″N 0°06′40″W

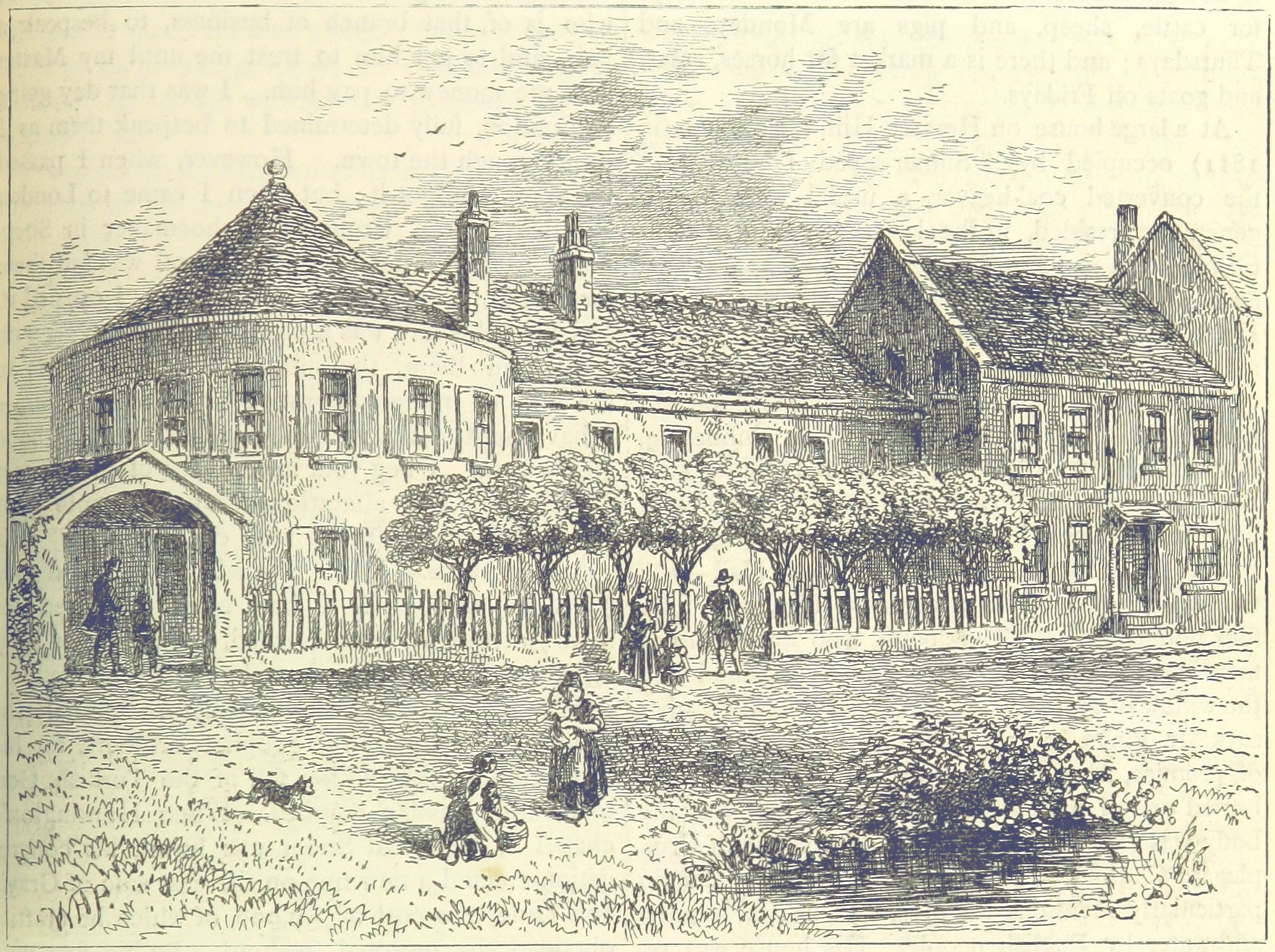
White Conduit House, about 1820

The White Conduit House was a building in Islington, London. From the late 17th century, it was a leisure resort away from the city centre. It was demolished in 1849.

== History ==
There were springs and conduit-heads in the area in the medieval period. A conduit house on the site originally supplied water to Greyfriars Monastery at Newgate. From the 1400s, it also supplied water for a Carthusian priory. It was repaired by Thomas Sutton, founder in 1611 of the London Charterhouse on the site of the priory, to which it supplied water until about 1654, when water was taken from the New River.

From the late 17th century, the site was a leisure resort away from the city centre. In 1754, the White Conduit House was advertised as having for its fresh attractions a long walk, a circular fish-pond, a number of pleasant shady arbours, hot loaves and butter, coffee, tea, and other liquors, unadulterated cream, and a handsome long room, with "copious prospects, and airy situation".

Cricket was played on a nearby field, White Conduit Fields; a club was formed here, the White Conduit Club, that eventually became Marylebone Cricket Club.

The house was rebuilt in 1828, the new building containing a ballroom. By 1833, the area was regarded as less respectable than formerly. The building was demolished in 1849; a pub now stands on the site, at the corner of Barnsbury Road and Dewey Road.
