= James Carlile (actor) =

English actor and dramatist

- Died: 12 July 1691; Aughrim, County Galway
- Occupations: Actor and dramatist

James Carlile (died 12 July 1691) was an English actor and dramatist.

== Biography ==
Carlile was a native of Lancashire, and joined the company at Drury Lane at some time previous to 1682. After mentioning the famous union of the two companies—the king's and the Duke's—under Betterton in 1882, Downes (Roscius Anglicanus) writes as follows: ‘Note, now Mr. Monfort and Mr. Carlile were grown to the maturity of good actors.' The only rôles in connection with which the name of Carlile survives are Aumale in the ‘Duke of Guise’ of Dryden and Lee, produced at the Theatre Royal in 1682, and Lesbino in Southerne's ‘Disappointment, or the Mother in Fashion,' given at the same house in 1684. Both characters are subordinate. As after this date the name of Carlile disappears as an actor from stage records, and as, according to Gildon, Carlile left the stage young, and previous to his death had, according to Cibber, risen to the rank of captain, it is probable that not long after this he joined the army. His connection with the stage was maintained by the production at the Theatre Royal, his former home, of ‘Fortune Hunters, or Two Fools well met,’ a fairly brisk and entertaining comedy, which was acted by Mr. and Mrs. Mountfort, Leigh, Kynaston, and Nokes, and printed in 4to in 1689. Downes, probably in mistake, refers to a much earlier production at Lincoln's Inn Fields of ‘Two fools well met' which he erroneously assigns to ‘Lodwick Carlile.’ Carlile, with his brother died at the battle of Aghrim on 12 July 1691, fighting in the army of Ginkel against the Irish and French.
