= Swift's Alley Free Church =

Episcopal Church of Ireland chapel in Dublin

Swift's Alley Free Church was an Episcopal Church of Ireland chapel in Swift's Alley and Francis Street, Dublin, Ireland.

== History ==
In 1653, a Baptist meeting-house (the first in Ireland) was established by Thomas Patient in Swift's Alley, Dublin, the essayist and baptist John Foster preached there in 1795 as the congregation dwindled. In 1835, it was sold, and an Episcopal Chapel was established, the church was officially consecrated in 1843 by the Church of Ireland. The church had a Sunday school and fellowship society.

There had been an independent church/meeting house, Plunket Street Meeting House, near by in Plunket Street (now Dillon Street), where many evangelical preachers preached.

In 1840 the trustees put the chapel under the visitation and clergy officiate under licence from the Church of Ireland Archbishop of Dublin.

Rev. Dr. Tresham Dames Gregg DD was appointed chaplain of the church in 1837, the Rev. Edward Perry Brooke, Rev. Thomas C. Skipton, Rev. George Hare and Rev. Henry Vere White also served as chaplains to the chapel.

The church building was sold, and has been used for a variety of uses including as a factory.
