= Dance Ireland =

Dance Ireland is an association that promotes professional dance in Ireland. It is Ireland’s national development organisation for dance. It is an all-Ireland membership organisation consisting of dance professionals, dance and arts organisations, educational institutions, students, and dance enthusiasts. Its programmes are operated locally, nationally, and internationally. The activities and services provided by Dance Ireland are open to both members and non-members. It manages and operates DanceHouse, a dance centre in Dublin, with licence from the Dublin City Council.

== History ==
Dance Ireland was established in 1989 and incorporated as a not-for-profit company limited by guarantee in 1992 under the name Association of Professional Dancers in Ireland Ltd (APDI). It adopted the trading name Dance Ireland in 2006. It was granted Charitable Status in 2012.

== Organisation ==
Dance Ireland is an active member of the European Dance Development Network (EDN), which is co-funded by the European Union. Dance Ireland has participated in major network projects funded by the EU such as modul-dance, Communicating Dance, and Léim.

The organisation receives Strategic Funding from the Arts Council of Ireland. It is also funded by the Dublin City Council. Additionally, Dance Ireland receives grant-aid for project initiatives from various national and international sources, such as Culture Ireland, Creative Europe, and Erasmus+.

== Building ==
DanceHouse is located in the north east inner city of Dublin. It has 6 double-height dance studios, an artists' resource room, an artists’ kitchen, green room facilities, and exhibition spaces.
