= Plunket Street Meeting House =

Former Presbyterian church in Dublin, Ireland

Coordinates: 53.340874°N 6.273504°W

Plunket Street Meeting House, Dublin was, in succession, the site of two Protestant congregations, first a Presbyterian Church, then an independent reformed evangelical church. Plunket Street once stood where John Dillon Street and Thomas Davis Street now stand. It was situated between Patrick's Street and Francis Street.

== Presbyterian Church (1692-1773) ==
A Presbyterian congregation was meeting in Bull Alley in Dublin from around the early 1660s. it was a union of two Cromwellian congregations led by Robert Chambers and Robert Norbury. The congregation's first longterm minister was the controversial Rev William Jacque who was the cause of a split within the congregation somewhere around 1668–1672. He took a section of his flock and opened a new meeting in Mary's Abbey, near Capel Street. The remaining congregation in Bull Alley moved to Plunket Street around 1692, to a property the landlord of which was Godwin Swift.

The first minister in Bull Alley was a Rev. Alexander Sinclair who came to Dublin to take up the position in 1692. Rev. James Arbuckle ministered in Plunket Street, but left with some of the congregation in 1713 and joined Ushers Quay Church. Rev. Thomas Maquay ministered from 1717 until 1729. Rev. Matthew Chalmers was pastor for a short time, the Rev. John Alexander was minister from 1730 until his death in 1743. Rev. William Patten, who was minister from 1745 to 1749, he was succeeded by Rev. Ebenezer Kilburn (whose son was the United Irishman, Rev. Sinclair Kilburn, A.B.), from 1749 until his death in 1773.

After Kilburn's death in 1773, the congregation voted to merge with that which met in Usher's Quay.

== Independent Episcopal Chapel (1773-1882) ==
The dissenting church (Presbyterian) existed on the site the eighteenth century which closed, with its new minister Rev. James Caldwell (ordained in Ushers quay in 1763) and the congregation moving to the Ushers Quay church. It was acquired by Lady Huntingdon who funded its refurbishment and reopening in 1773, the church used the Church of Ireland liturgy. The La Touche Family were also patrons of the church.

Although not a consecrated chapel in the established church, a number of evangelical Church of Ireland clergy preached at the Meeting house, such as the Hymn writer Rev. Thomas Kelly. The church supported an Alm's House, which housed a number of widows. Rev. John Hawkesworth (who produced a collection of hymns to be sung at church), was an early pastor at the church. The English Independent minister Timothy Priestley preached at the church on the invitation of Lady Huntington, he was followed as minister by Rev. William Cooper (secretary of the Irish Evangelical Society), who was presented with a Silver Cup for use as a Tabernacle in the chapel, by Town Major Henry Charles Sirr. Another pastor was a Rev. A. King and a Rev Houston. In 1843 the Rev. Simpson G. Morrison (ordained an Independent Minister, he had earlier been a Methodist in Armagh, he was also from the Irish Evangelical Society), became minister and began reviving the fortunes of the chapel, Morrison became Presbyterian minister of Union Chapel, Lower Abbey Street, and the Plunket Street Congregation joined up with the Union Chapel.

The meeting house closed in 1882, in 1885 the area was redeveloped by the Dublin Artisan Dwelling Company. There was a "free church" close to it, at Swift's Alley Free Church which became under the established church.

== After Closure ==
The legacy of the Plunket Street Meeting House was split between those who went with Morrison, joined the Union Chapel and became Presbyterians, and in 1918 merged with the Abbey Presbyterian Church on Parnell Square, and those who stayed independent and eventually became Unitarians, there are records of the meeting house held by the Dublin Unitarian Church.

There were two other similar Independent Chapels in Dublin, one in York Street (Congregationalist) another the Zion Chapel, King's Inns Street was opened in 1820.
