= Buckingham Street, Dublin =

Street in central Dublin, Ireland

Buckingham Street
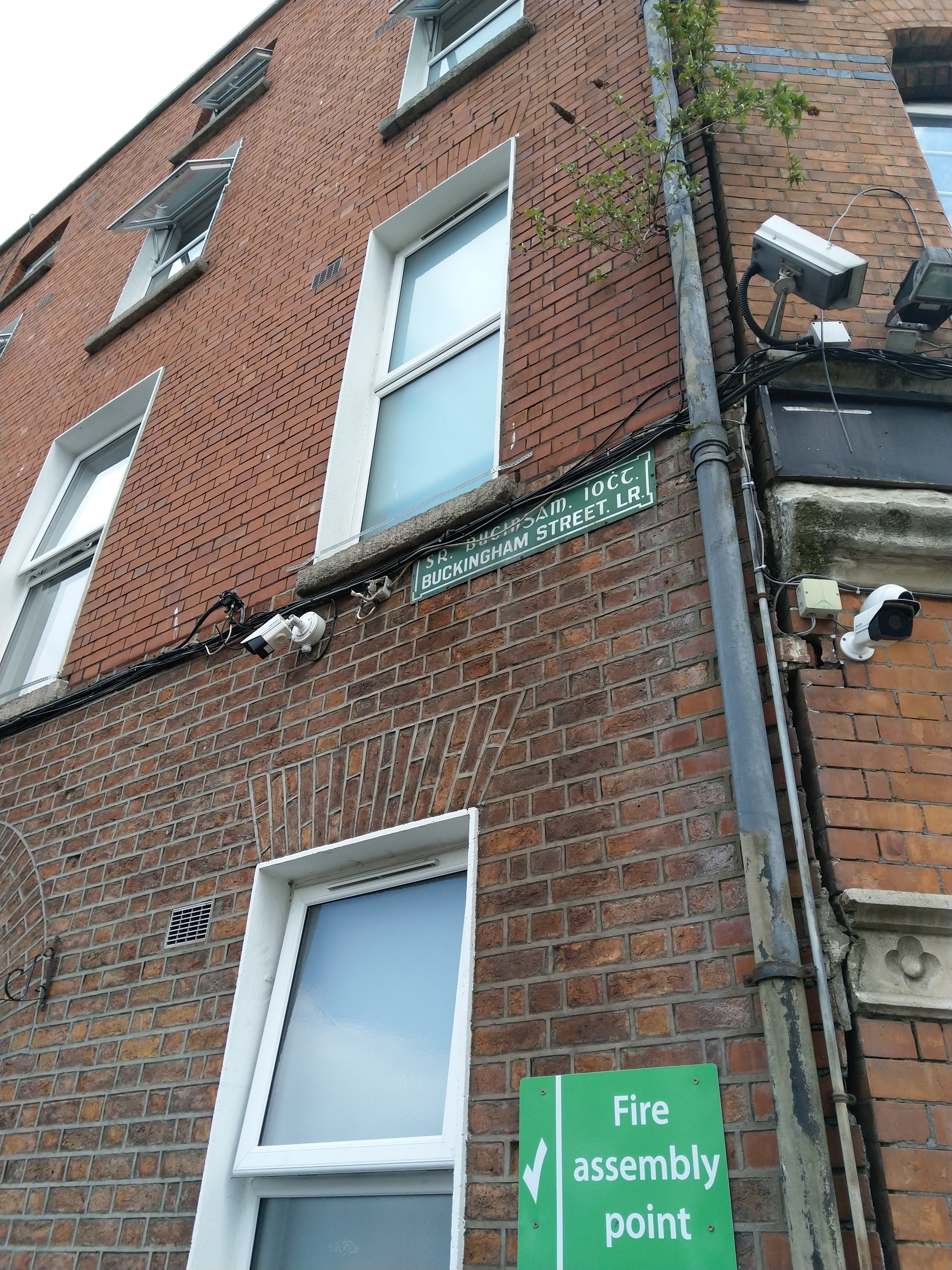

- Location within Central Dublin
- Native name: Sráid Buckingham (Irish); Sráid Bucingam (Irish)
- Namesake: George Nugent-Temple-Grenville, 1st Marquess of Buckingham
- Length: 414
- Width: 24 m (79 ft)
- Postal code: D01
- Coordinates: 53°21′16″N 6°15′00″W
- north end: Summerhill
- Major junctions: Seán McDermott Street and Killarney Street
- south end: Amiens Street

Buckingham Street is a street in Dublin running from Summerhill to Amiens Street. It is divided into Buckingham Street Lower (south end) and Buckingham Street Upper (north end).

== History ==
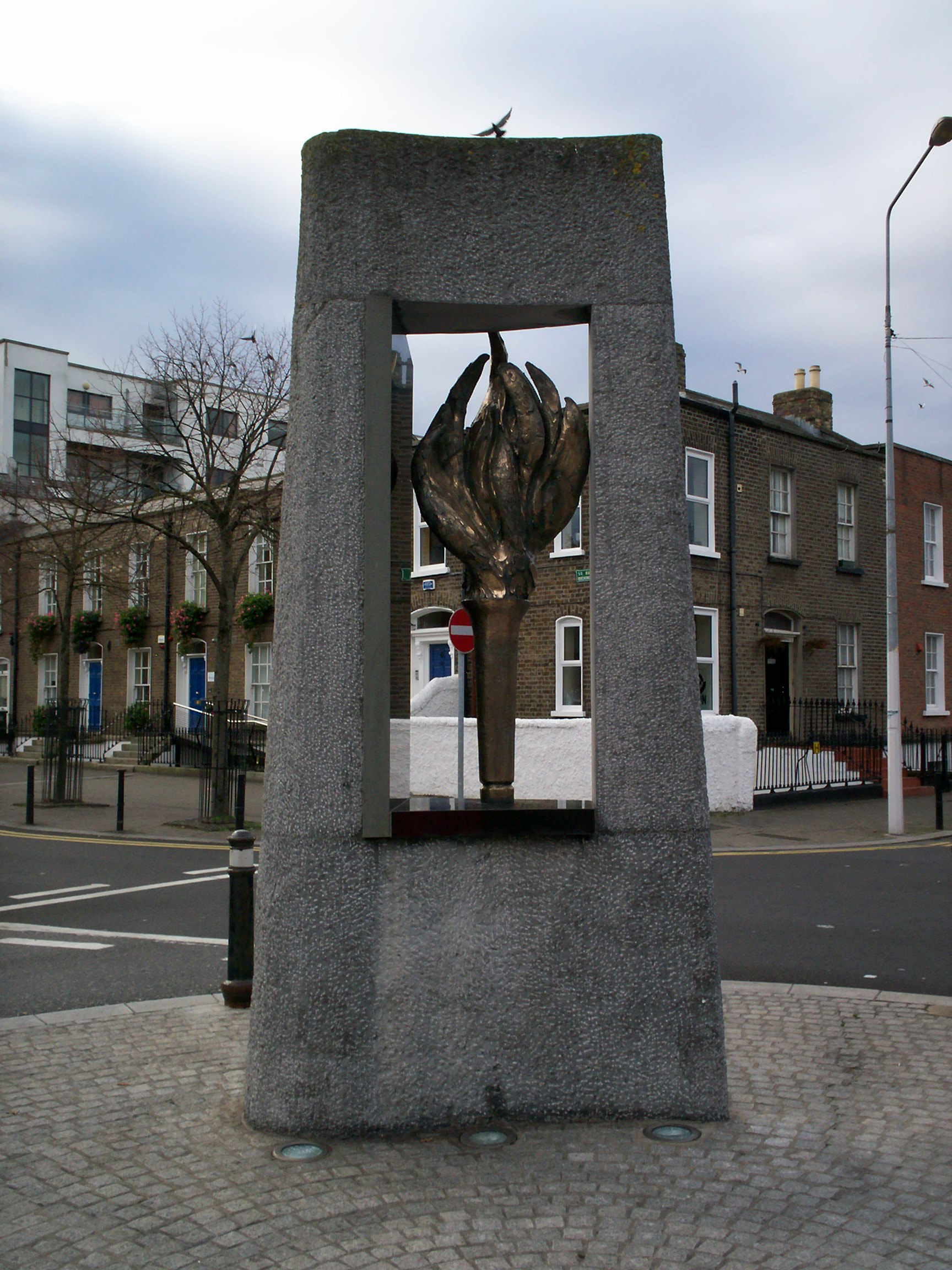
A sculpture entitled Home to commemorate lives lost to drug abuse at the corner of Buckingham Street Lower, Sean MacDermott Street Lower and Killarney Street

Buckingham Street was named for George Nugent-Temple-Grenville, 1st Marquess of Buckingham, the Lord Lieutenant of Ireland at the time of its creation. Nearby Temple Street and Grenville Street were also named for him around the same time. The upper section of the street is mentioned first around 1788 when plots of land on the new thoroughfare were laid out and offered with leases of 999 years. The street was initially planned to be 80 ft wide and 1300 ft long. It is possible that the land in this area was owned by Edward Stratford, 2nd Earl of Aldborough, who owned much of the land locally. It has been suggested that his membership of the Belles Lettres Literary Society inspired the naming of Bella Street, a small street off Upper Buckingham Street. From the 1790s, the street was developed by speculators.

Following the economic and social effects of the Act of Union in 1801, property prices declined steeply between 1790 and 1840. By 1841, there were 19 buildings on the upper section of the street, with number 6 listed as a police station. By 1854, a large portion of the street remained undeveloped, 66 years after it was initially laid out. The street was largely tenements by 1890.

Along with the neighbouring streets, Buckingham Street suffered deprivation throughout most of the 20th century. Between 1937 and 1939, a scheme of local authority flat complexes was built on the street, now known as the Killarney Street scheme. These were designed by Herbert George Simms. After the clearing of a number of the tenements on the street from number 11 to 17 a Dublin Corporation flat complex, Seán Treacy House, was built in the 1960s. Numbers 39 to 42 were demolished to make way for the Mountain View Court flats in the early 1970s, along with a number of Georgian houses on Summerhill. Mountain View Court was later demolished and the site was redeveloped in 2004, and the Sean Tracey flats were similarly demolished and replaced beginning in 2009.

A Christmas tree has been erected on this site each year since 1996 with a star memorialising a person who died from drug abuse, primarily heroin. In 2000 there were 124 stars on the tree. In 2000, the sculpture Home was unveiled on the street as a permanent memorial. It is by Leo Higgins and is a gilded bronze flame within a limestone doorway.

== Architecture ==
One of the grandest buildings on the street is 9 Upper Buckingham Street, which was built in the 1810s by John Beresford for his son John Claudius Beresford. This house was later converted into a hospital, and was the first site of the Children's Health Ireland at Temple Street as St Joseph's Infirmary for Sick Children.

The fire station on Lower Buckingham Street, which dates from 1899, is the oldest in a series of stations designed by the city architect, Charles J. McCarthy. Featuring an Italian Romanesque style, there was an attached alarm bell at Tara Street. The building now houses art studios.

=== Buckingham Buildings ===
Upper Buckingham Street features one of the earliest Dublin Artisans' Dwellings Company schemes, known as Buckingham Buildings. The scheme was built on land donated by Francis Beatty, a resident at number 37. Designed by Thomas Drew, work commenced in 1876, and consisted of two sections of purpose-built tenement blocks. Block A was completed in 1878 and consisted of two storeys over basement. Block B was completed in 1879 and was a larger development of 4 storeys over basement with a large central staircase. The development was never popular with tenants, and many of the flats remained vacant for long periods of time. They were sold to Texacloth Ltd in 1979, and later "coarsely" remodelled in the early 1990s. It was renamed Buckingham Village in 1993.

== Notable residents ==
- John O'Donovan, lived at 36 Upper Buckingham Street from 1853 to 1861.
- Bram Stoker lived at 19 Buckingham Street, from age 11 to 17. The house, which is derelict, had murals added to mark his association with the street.
- Patrick Kelly, one of the children killed during the events of the Easter Rising, lived at 24 Buckingham Buildings.
- John Claudius Beresford, lived at number 8 for a period
- Troy Parrott, lived on Buckingham Street growing up
