= Two Working Men =

Public art in Cork, Ireland

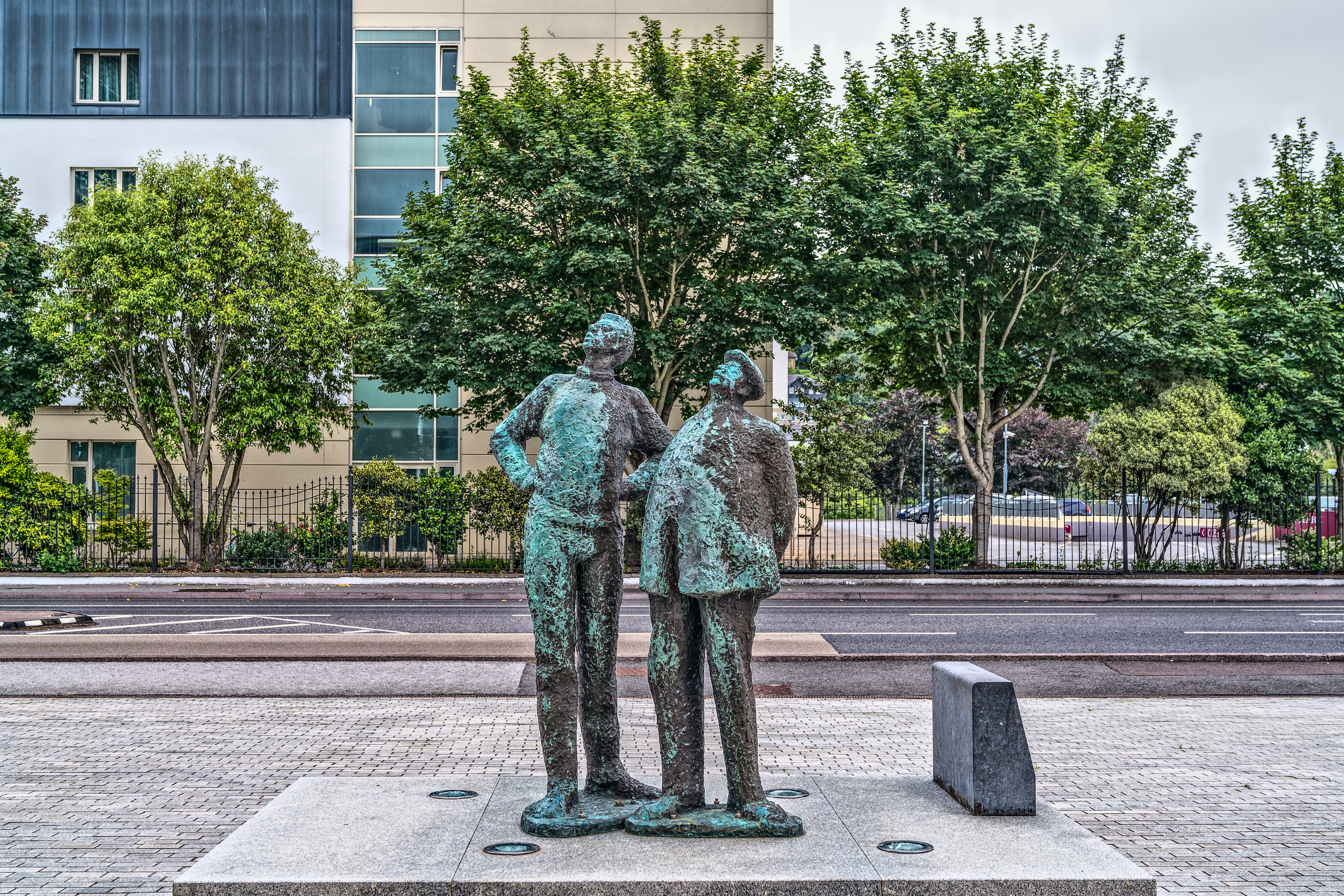
- Artist: Oisín Kelly
- Year: 1969
- Type: Stone; Bronze
- Location: Cork County Hall, Cork
- 51.893°N 8.508°W

Two Working Men (Irish: Beirt Fhear Oibre) are a pair of statues made by the Irish sculptor Oisín Kelly. The piece took Kelly three years to create and was unveiled in front of the County Hall in Cork in 1969. As with other works of public art in the region, the statues took on a local colloquial name, and are still commonly known as "Cha and Miah".

== History ==
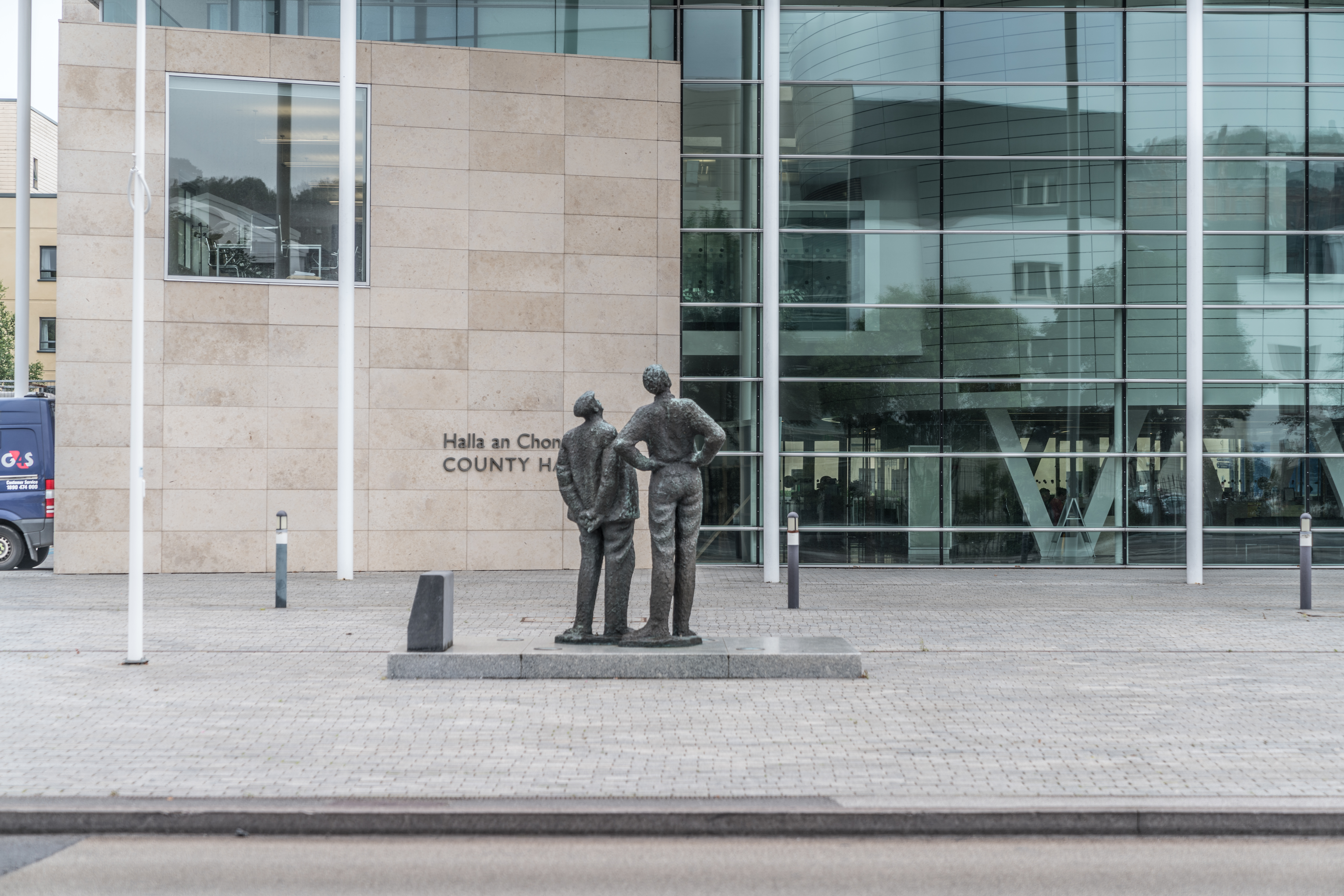
The Two Working Men looking at the Cork County Hall

Two Working Men became Kelly's second statue on public display, after his acclaimed Children of Lir was unveiled at Dublin's Garden of Remembrance in 1966. That year, Kelly received a commission for a new statue, to be erected outside Liberty Hall in Dublin, which at the time was Ireland's tallest building and the headquarters of the SIPTU trade union.

Before the statues were to be moved outside Liberty Hall however, SIPTU deemed that they would pose a traffic hazard. In 2007 Desmond Rea O'Kelly, architect of Liberty Hall, reflected on this lost opportunity:

One of the other things I also regret very much is that Oisín Kelly's great sculpture of the young man and the older man admiring their work was never put up outside Liberty Hall.

The work was instead unveiled in front of Cork's new county hall building in 1969, which during the time the statues were being made had unseated Liberty Hall as the tallest building in Ireland. (It would remain the tallest building in Ireland until 2008.)

The statues were removed for a period during the redevelopment of the County Hall, but were replaced in 2006.

== Appearance and legacy ==
The statues consist of two men, one tall and thin and the other shorter and stout. The shorter man is shown wearing a cap and clasping his hands behind his back while the taller man's hands are placed on his hips. Both men are gazing skyward, ostensibly at the top of the building. The statue's key message is to profile the common "everyday Irish person" admiring the finished product of work in a modern Ireland.

In the years after their unveiling, the statues became known locally as "Cha and Miah". The label derives from the names of two "everyman" Cork characters on the Hall's Pictorial Weekly television show which became popular in the early 1970s.
