= Henry Street, Dublin =

Street in Dublin, Ireland

Henry Street

- Location within Central Dublin
- Native name: Sráid Anraí (Irish)
- Namesake: Henry Moore, 1st Earl of Drogheda
- Width: 12 metres (39 ft)
- Location: Dublin, Ireland
- Postal code: D01
- Coordinates: 53.34947°N 6.262401°W
- west end: Mary Street
- east end: O'Connell Street

Other
- Known for: shops Birthplace of Robert Stewart, Viscount Castlereagh

Henry Street (Irish: Sráid Anraí) is located on Dublin's Northside and is one of the two principal shopping streets of Dublin (the other being Grafton Street).

== Location ==
Henry Street runs from the Spire of Dublin and the General Post Office on O'Connell Street in the east to Liffey Street in the west. At Liffey Street, the street becomes Mary Street, which continues the shopping street until it ends at crossing Capel Street. Henry Street and Mary Street are often considered as one (and in fact form a single shopping area with their eastward continuations, beyond the Spire, North Earl Street and Talbot Street).

Henry Street is connected to Princes Street North by the GPO Arcade.

== History ==
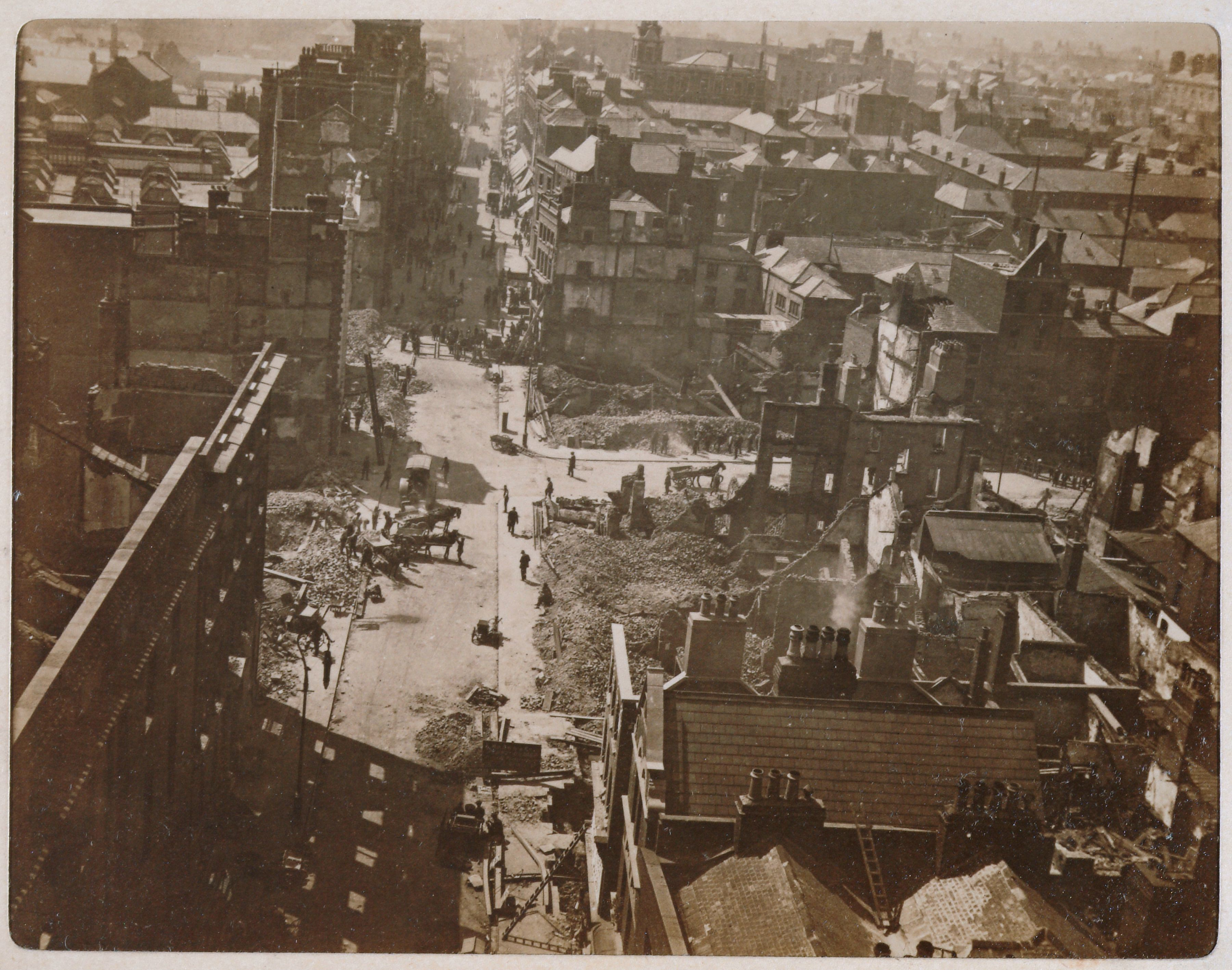
Henry Street looking westward from Nelson's Pillar, 18 May 1916

The land around Dublin's Northside was the original part of the estate of St Mary's Abbey. It was given to James FitzGerald, 13th Earl of Desmond following the Dissolution of the Irish monasteries in 1537. The street was developed by Henry Moore, 1st Earl of Drogheda in 1614, whose estate lands and developments are reflected in the street names bearing his name, Henry Street, Moore Street, Earl Street, Of Lane and Drogheda Street. Most of those names still survive, but what was Drogheda Street is now O'Connell Street, Dublin's main street. The area was later sold to Luke Gardiner in the early 1700s. Of or Off Lane is now known as Henry Place. The street was shown on Charles Brooking's map of Dublin, published in 1728.

Properties began to be developed along Henry Street in the 1760s, with a variety of businesses and shops. There are now none of the original Georgian properties left. The street was pedestrianised in the 1980s. The flagship Arnotts store is at nos. 9-15 Henry Street, and has been based there since 1843. The current name dates from 1865. The original buildings were extensively destroyed by fire in 1894. Many buildings on the street were damaged or destroyed during the 1916 Easter Rising and only two 19th-century properties survived - Arnotts at Bos. 9-15 and No. 6. Rebuilding took place soon afterwards, with several buildings constructed from concrete or brick. Nos. 27-30 were removed to accommodate the extension of the General Post Office building on O'Connell Street in the 1920s.

A Roches Stores department store was established on the corner of Henry Street and Coles Lane in 1960. The premises were redeveloped in 2003.

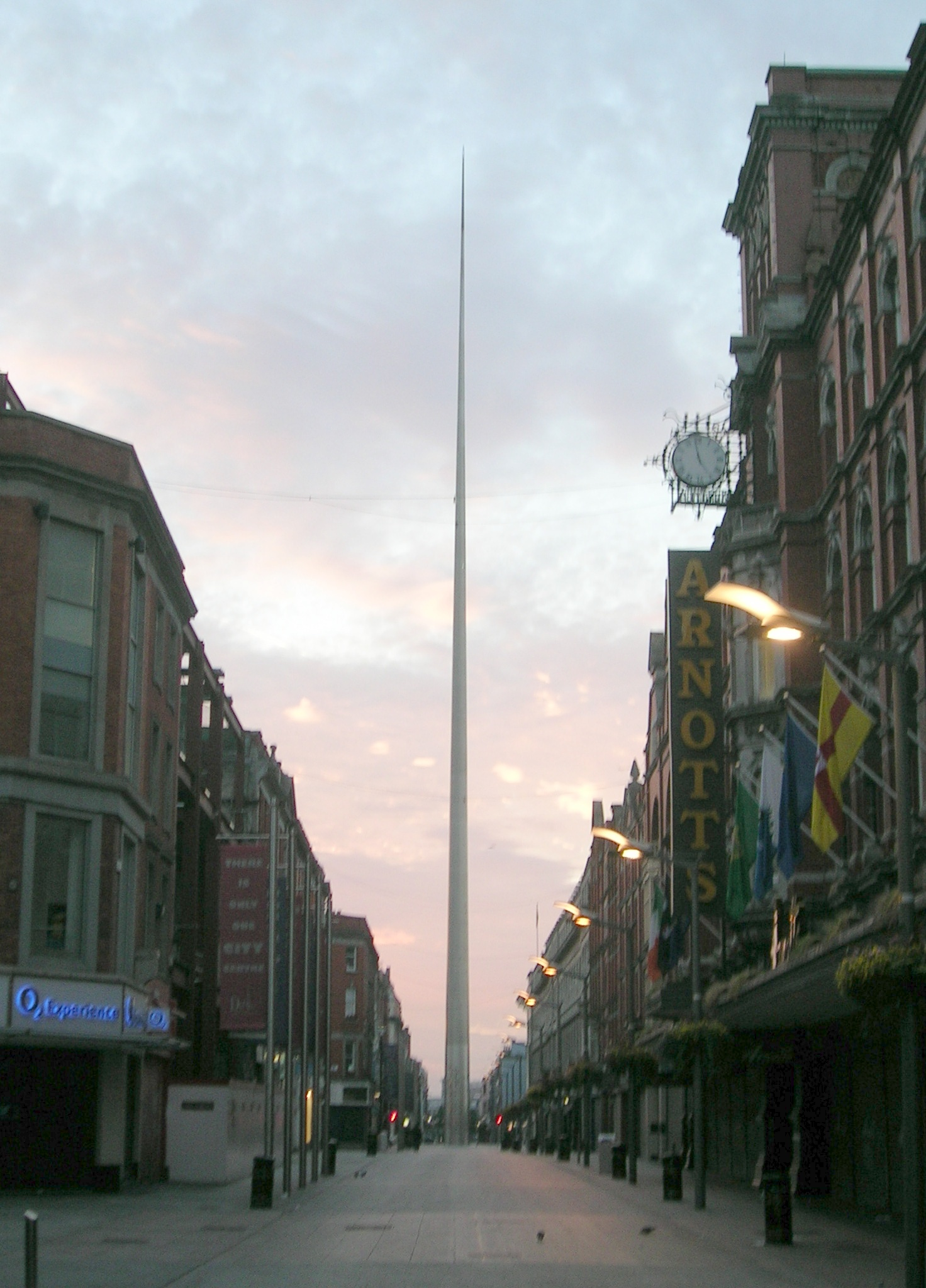
View of The Spire from Arnotts department store

The Ilac Centre, Dublin city's first shopping centre began construction in 1977. As well as an entrance on Henry Street, it linked it to Parnell Street and Moore Street. It was refurbished in 2006 at a cost of €60 million. The Ilac Centre is home to over 80 stores and restaurants and Dublin Citys Central Library. Dunnes Stores store on Henry St also has an entrance leading into the Ilac's Central Mall.

Henry Street is home to some of Irelands most popular stores including a flagship Dunnes Stores, Next, Arnotts Department Store and Marks & Spencer. Grocery shopping on the street include Dunnes Stores, Tesco, M&S FoodHall and the Fruit & Veg market stalls on nearby Moore Street. Roches Stores had a large department store on the street which was later sold to Debenhams in 2007, the store closed down in 2020 when Debenhams went into receivership. The unit is under development as of 2025.

The first ever Penneys/Primark store opened on Mary Street (a continuation of Henry Street) in 1969.

The Jervis Shopping Centre is also on Mary Street, home to over 60 stores including Boots, JD Sports, Tesco and the largest New Look store in the world. The opening of the Jervis Centre in 1996 brought many UK high street stores to Ireland for the very first time including Boots, Argos & Debenhams.

Buskers, including musicians, poets and mime artists, commonly perform to the shopping crowds.

Henry Street is home to the Henry St Christmas Market every December where the street is lined with street traders for the month selling Christmas decorations, gifts & toys. This has been a long standing tradition with Dubliners who come into Henry St for their Christmas shopping to buy off the traders. December 8 is also a famous date in Ireland for people from the countryside to come up to Dublin City for shopping.

== See also ==
- List of upscale shopping districts
- List of streets and squares in Dublin
