= ILAC =

ILAC may refer to:

- Institutional Learning and Change Initiative
- International Laboratory Accreditation Cooperation
- Ilac Shopping Centre, Dublin, Ireland
