= Northside, Dublin =

Informal division of Dublin, Ireland

The Northside
- Dublin, north of the Liffey
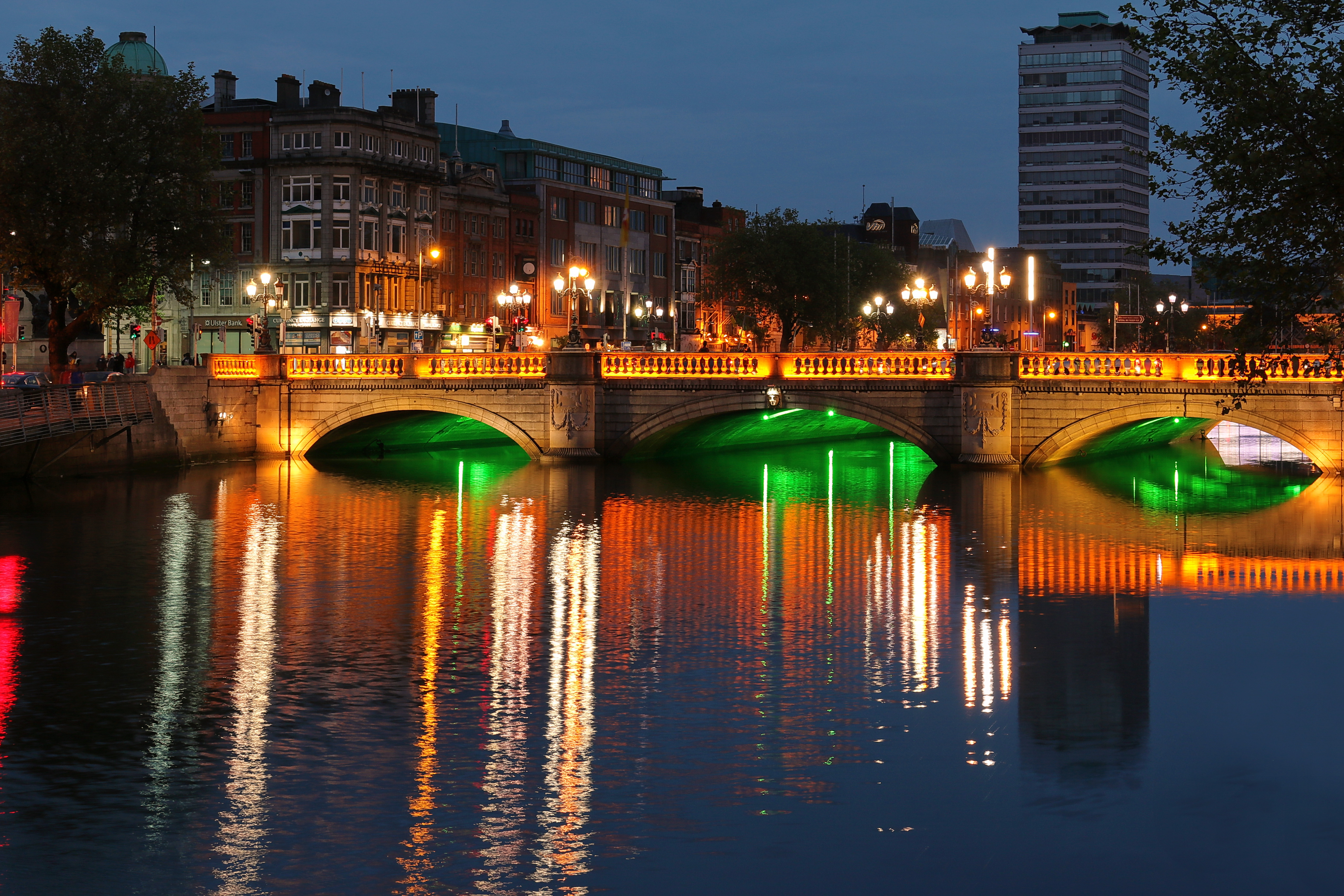
- O'Connell Bridge, looking northeast
- Country: Ireland
- County: County Dublin
- City: Dublin

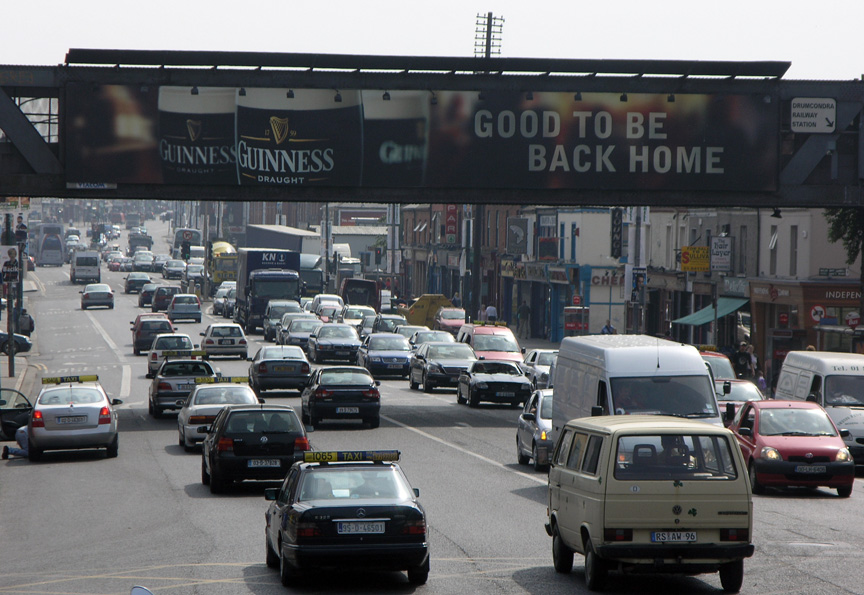
Traffic passing the Independent Bridge at Drumcondra

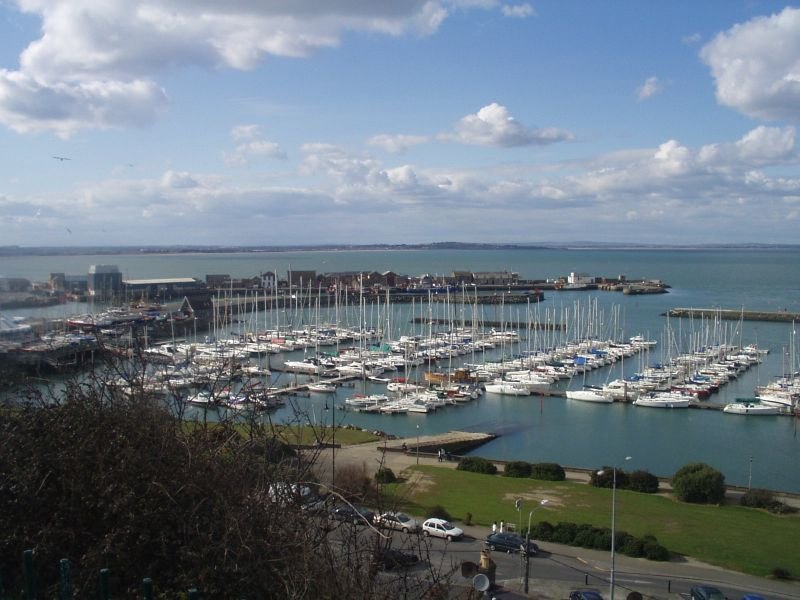
The harbour at Howth

The Northside (Irish: Taobh Ó Thuaidh) is an informal but commonly used term to describe the part of the city of Dublin that lies to the north of the River Liffey, and extending into part of North County Dublin. The part outside the city is within the county of Fingal, a local government area established in 1994. While it is sometimes regarded as less wealthy than the city's Southside, the Northside was originally the home of the city's upper classes and the more privileged of the two. Today, some of the wealthiest areas in Ireland, such as Malahide, Howth, Clontarf, and Castleknock, lie north of the river.

== Definition ==
Not being an administrative area, the Northside is variously defined. It generally includes those parts of Dublin city that lie north of the River Liffey. County Dublin settlements north of the M50 motorway, such as Swords and Malahide, which have developed into suburbs of Dublin city, are usually included.

== Popular culture ==
James Joyce set several of the Dubliners stories on the Northside, reflecting his childhood sojourns in Drumcondra and Fairview. Among the more recent best-selling writers to have written extensively about the Northside are Dermot Bolger and Booker Prize winner Roddy Doyle, who set several of his novels in the fictional Northside area of Barrytown.

The soap opera Fair City is set in Carrigstown, a fictional suburb within Dublin's Northside. According to the RTÉ Guide, Carrigstown is bounded by Drumcondra to the north, the city centre to the south, East Wall to the east and Phibsboro to the west.

== Areas of the Northside ==
The Northside includes Dublin city centre north of the Liffey, of whose many streets some are noted below, and districts such as Smithfield and Summerhill. Some older districts, such as Oxmantown, no longer exist. Beyond the centre, areas of the Northside include those listed below, most (at least two names were invented in the 1960s) of the names being of long heritage, though until recently many were rural townlands. Some are distinct suburbs or villages; others are parts of larger areas:

- Artane
- Arbour Hill
- Ashtown
- Balbriggan
- Ballybough
- Ballyboughal
- Baldoyle
- Balgriffin
- Ballygall
- Ballymun
- Bayside
- Beaumont
- Blanchardstown
- Broadstone
- Cabra
- Castleknock
- Clonee
- Clongriffin
- Clonsilla
- Clontarf
- Coolock
- Corduff
- Darndale
- Dollymount
- Donabate
- Donaghmede
- Donnycarney
- Drumcondra
- East Wall
- Fairview
- Finglas
- Glasnevin
- Grangegorman
- Harmonstown
- Howth
- Kilbarrack
- Killester
- Kilmore
- Kinsealy
- Malahide
- Marino
- Mulhuddart
- North Wall
- North Strand
- Ongar
- Oxmantown
- Phibsboro
- Portmarnock
- Priorswood
- Raheny
- Santry
- Sheriff Street
- Skerries
- Smithfield
- Stoneybatter
- Strawberry Beds
- Sutton
- Summerhill
- Swords
- Tyrrelstown
- Whitehall.

The area is administered both by Dublin City Council (formerly Dublin Corporation) and Fingal County Council, responsible for 84% and 16% respectively of the land area which lies inside the M50 motorway and north of the River Liffey (excluding the Howth peninsula).

== Postcodes ==
Traditionally, Dublin postal districts on the Northside begin with odd numbers, while those on the Southside begin with even numbers. For example, O'Connell Street is in Dublin 1, whereas the outer suburb of Ballymun is in Dublin 11. An exception is the Phoenix Park, which is on the Northside but is part of Dublin 8. The reason for this is explained by historian Pat Liddy: "Long before there were postal codes, the James's Street Postal Sorting Office looked after the Phoenix Park, because it was considered to be closer and more convenient than Phibsborough. James's Street continued in this role when the postal codes were introduced, so Dublin 8 it had to be."

The Eircode system adopted for all postal addresses in Ireland in 2014 adapted the old postal districts for addresses in Dublin, with addresses in Dublin 1 having a prefix beginning D01, and Dublin 11 having a prefix beginning D11, etc. The outer edges of the Northside within the city and Fingal also contain all but one of the K Eircode areas. Swords, for example, is in Dublin K67, whereas Malahide is in the K36 area. The single exception to the rule is Lucan, which is in south-west Dublin and is designated as Dublin K78. Another quirk of the postal district system on the Northside is that the town of Clonee in Dublin's neighbouring County Meath has the Eircode of D15.

An example of an address including the traditional Dublin postal district

The Gresham Hotel
23 Upper O'Connell Street
Dublin 1
D01 C3W7.

An example of an address from outside the traditional postal districts:

Coffee Works
62 Main Street
Swords
County Dublin
K67 RX94.

== Landmarks ==
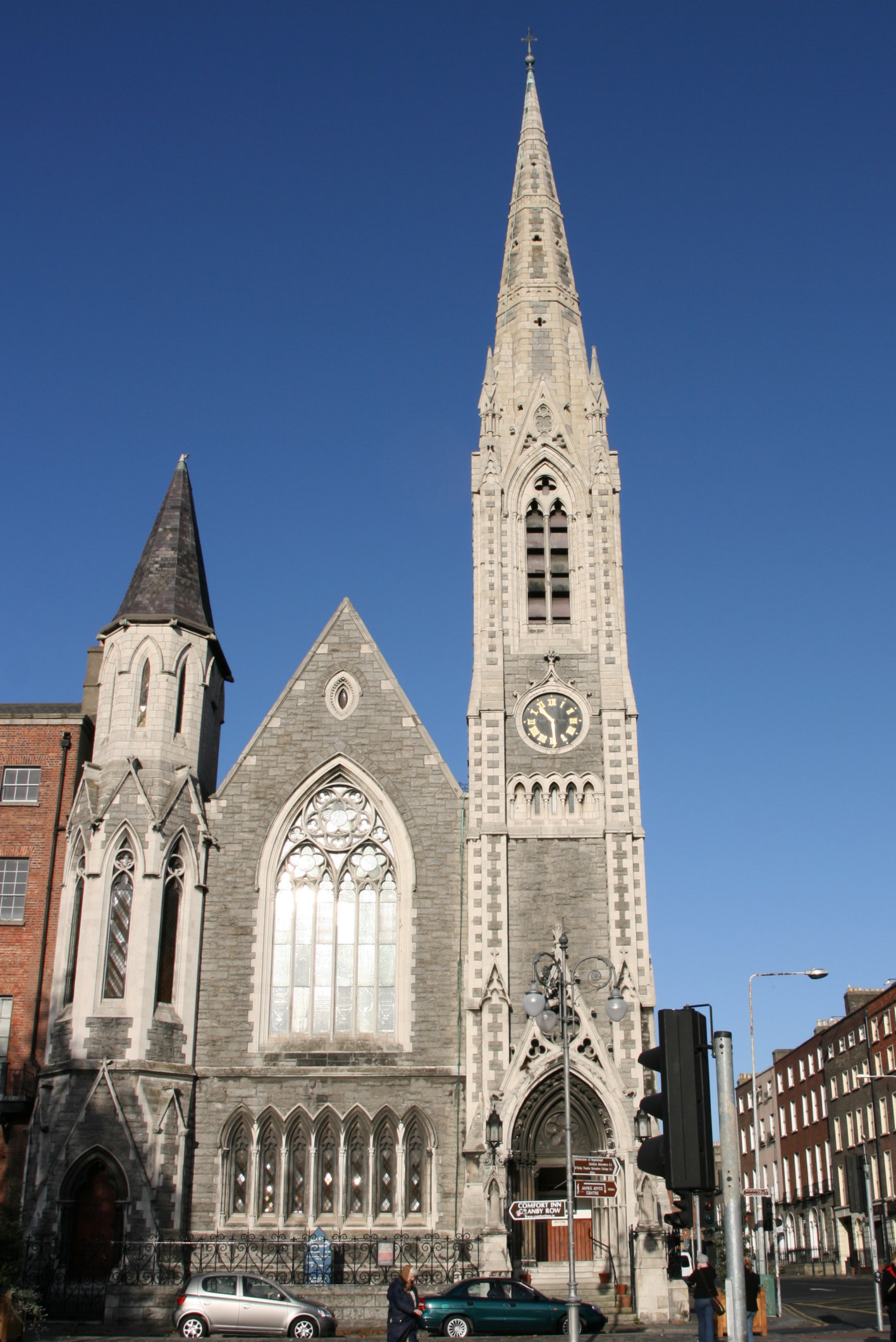
Findlater's Church (Abbey Presbyterian Church), Parnell Square

The Parnell Monument at the top of O'Connell Street

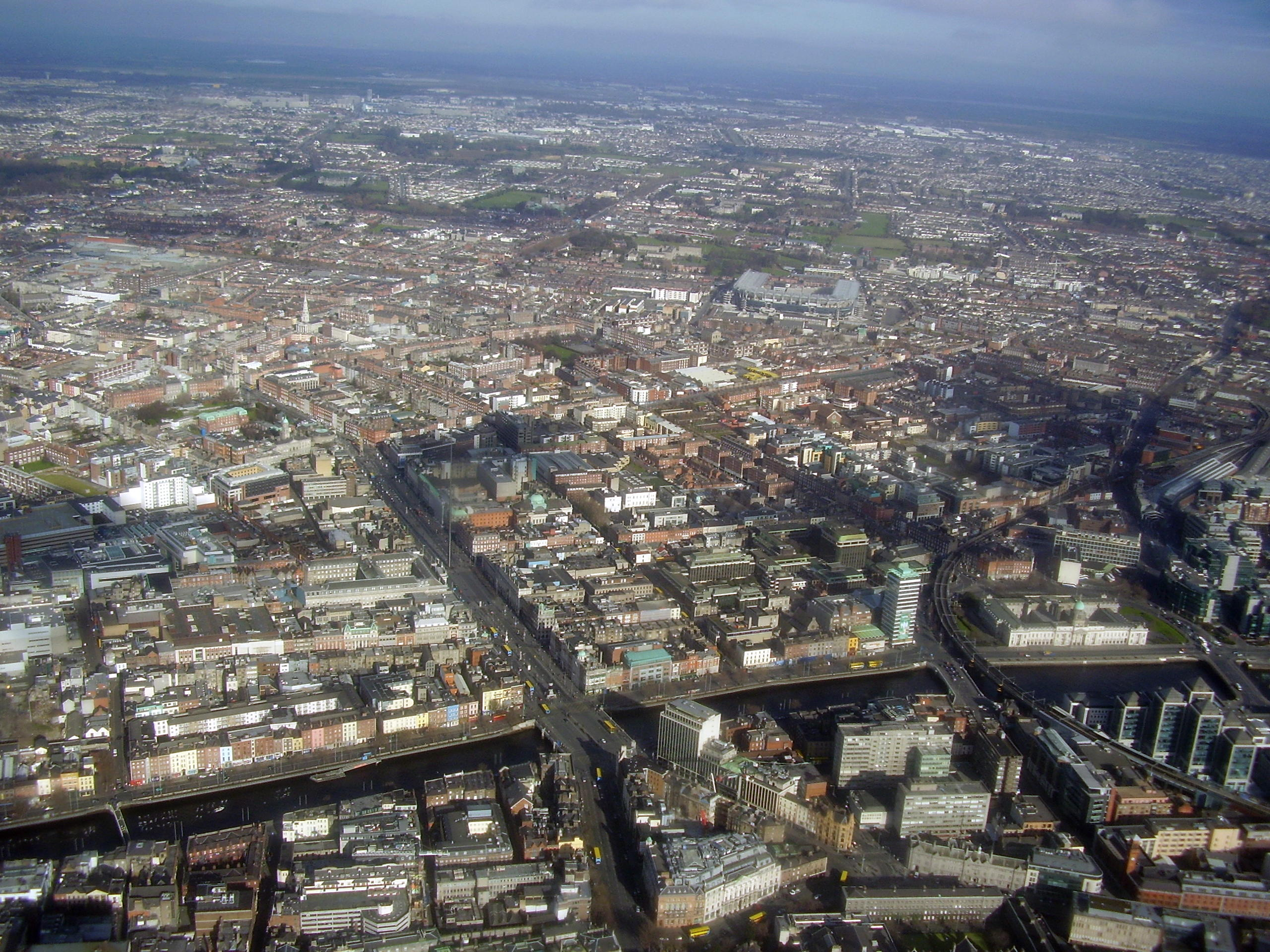
Aerial view of Dublin's Northside, with O'Connell Street in the left-foreground, Croke Park in the centre-middle-ground and Clontarf and Portmarnock in the background

Well-known places and sights on the Northside include:

- Abbey Street
- Abbey Theatre, the Irish National Theatre
- Ambassador Theatre
- Áras an Uachtaráin, the residence of the President
- Arbour Hill Prison
- Beaumont Hospital
- Blessington Street Basin
- Bull Island including Dollymount Strand
- Capel Street
- Casino at Marino
- Casino Model Railway Museum
- Castleknock Castle
- Clontarf Castle
- Croppies' Acre
- Connolly Station
- Croke Park
- Custom House
- Dalymount Park
- Dorset Street
- Dublin City Gallery The Hugh Lane
- Dublin City University
- Dublin Port
- Dublin Zoo
- Dunsink Observatory
- EPIC The Irish Emigration Museum
- Farmleigh
- Four Courts
- Garden of Remembrance
- Gate Theatre
- General Post Office (GPO)
- Glasnevin Cemetery
- Grand Canal
- Grangegorman Military Cemetery
- Henrietta Street
- Henry Street
- Howth Castle
- Howth Head
- International Financial Services Centre
- Ireland's Eye
- Irish Writers Centre
- James Joyce Centre
- King's Inns
- Lambay Island
- Malahide Castle and regional park
- Mater Hospital
- Moore Street
- Morton Stadium
- Mountjoy Prison
- Mountjoy Square
- National Aquatic Centre
- National Botanic Gardens
- National Museum of Ireland (Collins Barracks)
- National Transport Museum of Ireland
- Newbridge Demesne
- North Circular Road
- O'Connell Monument
- O'Connell Street
- Old Jameson Whiskey Distillery
- Parnell Monument
- Parnell Square
- Phoenix Park
- Rotunda Hospital
- Royal Canal
- Saint Anne's Park
- St. Brendan's Hospital, Dublin
- St Doulagh's Church
- St. Mary's Church
- St. Mary's Hospital (Phoenix Park)
- St Mary's Cathedral
- St. Michan's Church
- Smithfield
- Spire of Dublin
- Swords Castle
- Talbot Street
- The Helix
- Tolka Park
- Wellington Monument
- 3Arena

Major transport hubs include Connolly Station, Busáras (the national central bus station) and Dublin Airport. The main shopping area in the north inner city, and the busiest shopping street in Ireland, is Henry Street/Mary Street, just off O'Connell Street. Three of the five city-centre shopping centres are located on the Northside: the Jervis Shopping Centre, the Ilac Centre/Moore Street Mall, and the Irish Life Shopping Mall, along with Dublin's largest out-of-town centre, at Blanchardstown, and others at Swords, Coolock, Charlestown in northern Finglas, and Donaghmede. The Cineworld (UGC) cinema on Parnell Street is the largest cinema in Ireland with seventeen screens, while the Savoy, located on O'Connell Street and operated by IMC, is one of Ireland's oldest cinemas.

Institutions of higher education include the Grangegorman Campus of Technological University Dublin, the newest university established in Dublin, and Dublin City University, with its campus located primarily in Glasnevin and Drumcondra.

State bodies based on the Northside include Met Éireann (the national meteorological office), the Central Fisheries Board, Enterprise Ireland (the national enterprise and trade board), the National Standards Authority of Ireland, Sustainable Energy Authority of Ireland, the Marine Institute, the Department of Defence, the Department of Education and Youth, and the Department of Housing, Local Government and Heritage.
