= County Hall, Cork =

Municipal building in County Cork, Ireland

Cork County Hall
- Halla an Chontae, Corcaigh
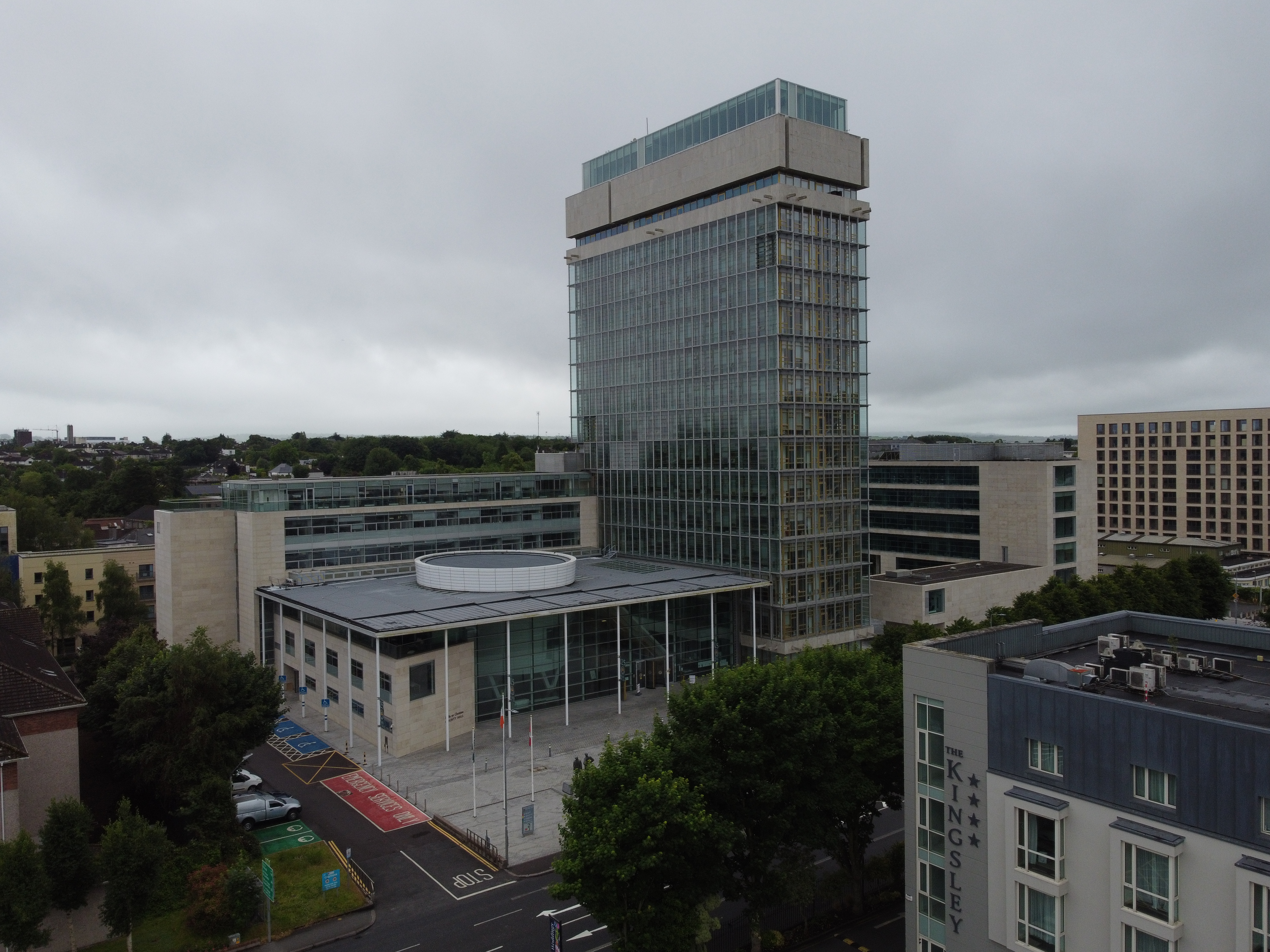
- Cork County Hall

- Location within County Cork

General information
- Location: Carrigrohane Road, Cork, Ireland
- Construction started: 1965
- Completed: 1968

Technical details
- Floor count: 17

Design and construction
- Architect: Patrick McSweeney

The County Hall (Irish: Halla an Chontae, Corcaigh) is a 17-storey office block, owned by Cork County Council and housing its administrative headquarters. The building is located on Carrigrohane Road in the city of Cork. Although the building is owned by Cork County Council, it is located in the city, a separate administrative area from the county. At 67 metres (220 ft) tall, the building was the tallest storied building in the country upon completion. However, it has since been surpassed by three other buildings. It is now a protected building.

== History ==
Originally meetings of Cork County Council had been held in the back portion of the top floor of Cork Courthouse. By the 1950s these premises were becoming inadequate and work on a new purpose-built building, designed by Patrick McSweeney, the Cork County Architect, started in 1965. It was officially opened in April 1968. Oisín Kelly's statue, Two Working Men, stands outside the complex.

== Redevelopment ==
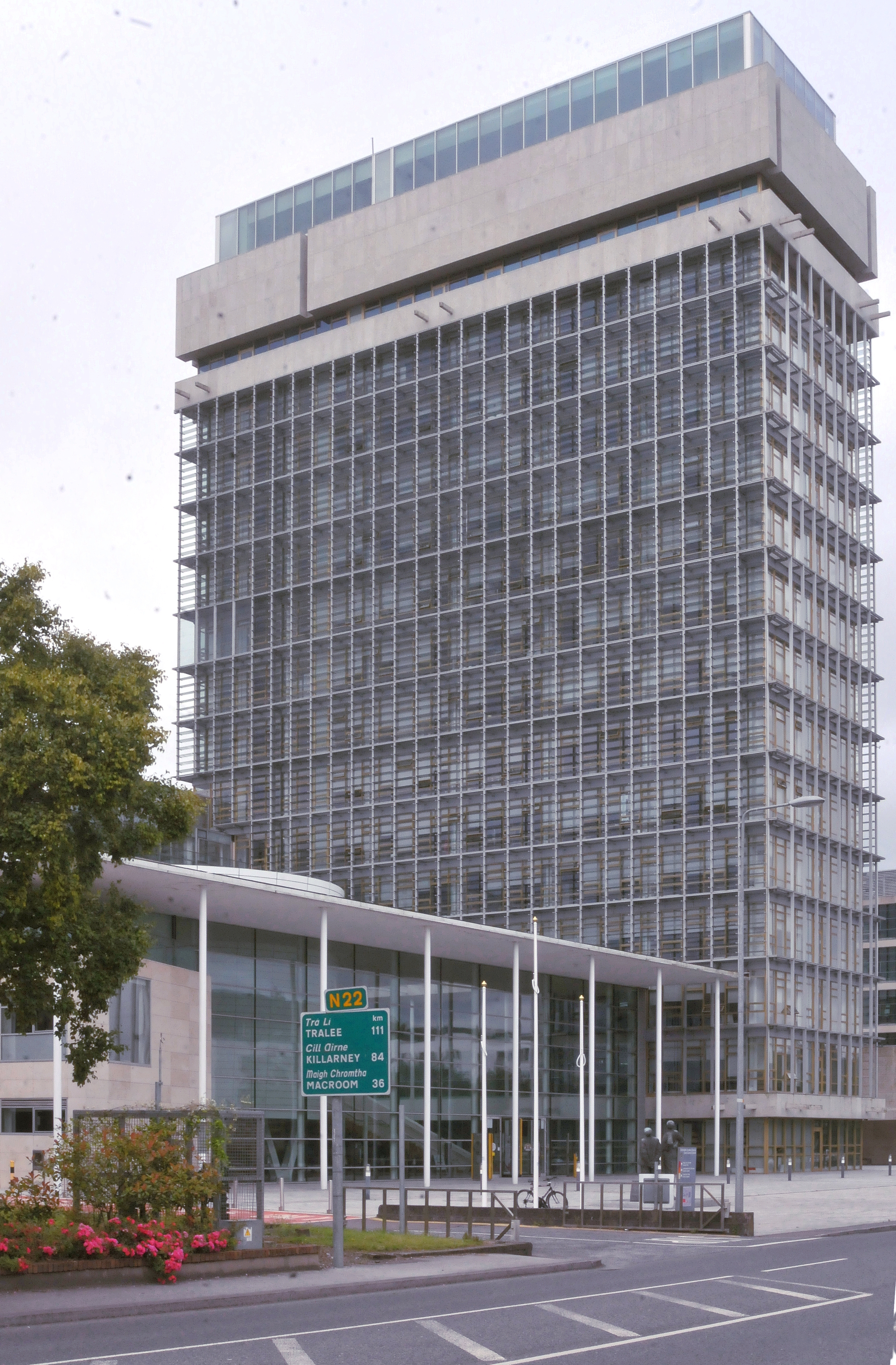
The Hall in 2017

A redevelopment project began in 2002 to re-clad the existing building, add a new storey to the tower block and build a six-storey extension to the side of the tower. The original distinctive concrete facade had been severely eroded and it was decided to replace rather than repair this as part of an expansion scheme. A louvered glass cladding replaced the original concrete, and the six-storey extension at ground level was completed in June 2006, as well as a new concourse and council chamber. The redevelopment cost €50 million.
