= North Earl Street =

Short street in central Dublin, Ireland

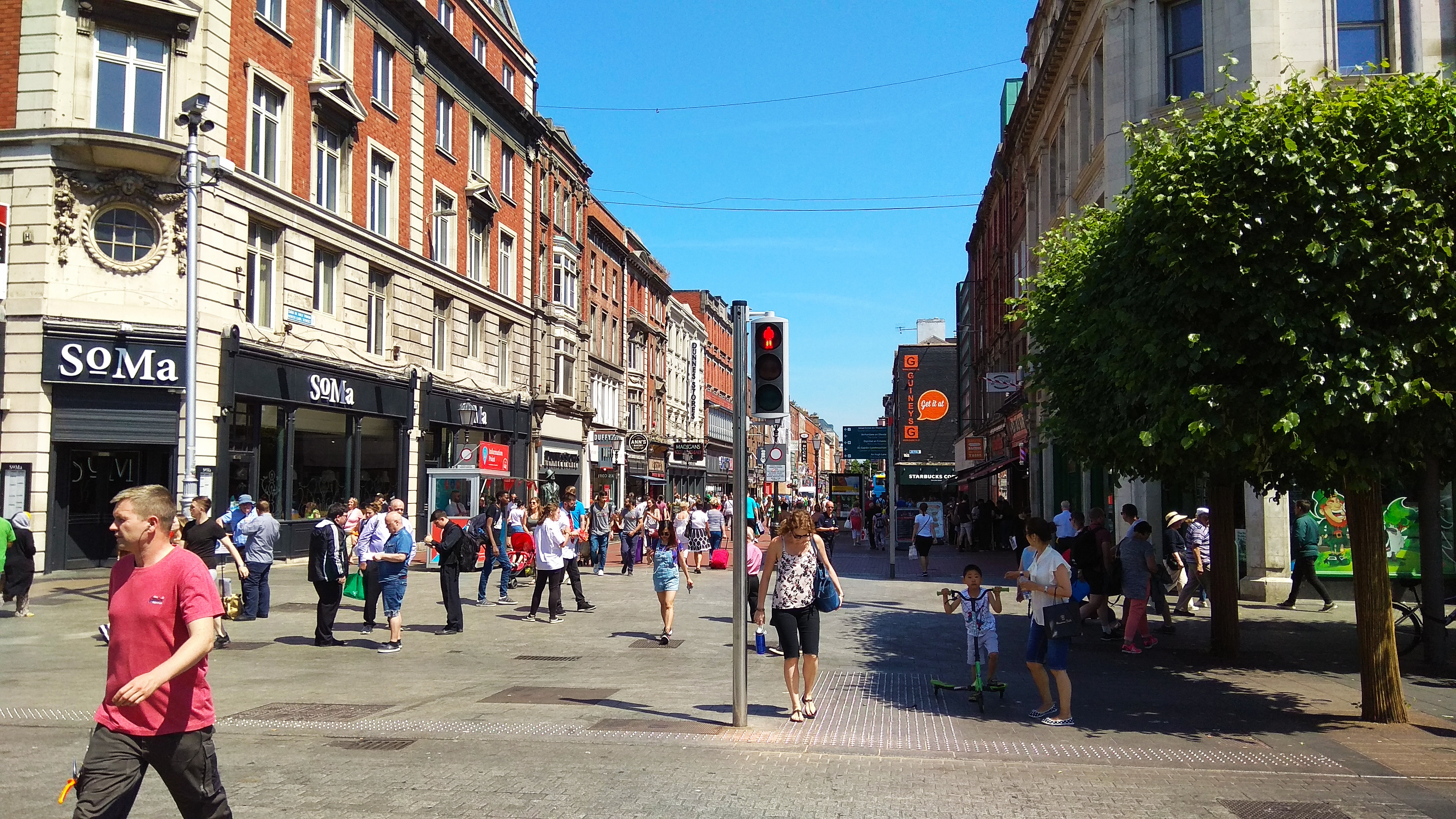
- Looking eastwards from O'Connell Street in 2018

- Location within Central Dublin
- Native name: Sráid an Iarla Thuaidh (Irish)
- Namesake: Henry Moore, 1st Earl of Drogheda
- Length: 130 m (430 ft)
- Width: 18 metres (59 ft)
- Location: Dublin, Ireland
- Postal code: D01
- Coordinates: 53.349999°N 6.259197°W
- west end: O'Connell Street
- east end: Marlborough Street, Talbot Street

Other
- Known for: shops, James Joyce statue

North Earl Street (Irish: Sráid an Iarla Thuaidh) is a short stretch of city-centre street located on Dublin's Northside and formerly a major shopping area. It runs from Marlborough Street in the west to O'Connell Street beside the Spire.

The street was first developed in the late 18th century. It was badly damaged, along with neighbouring streets, in the aftermath of the 1916 Easter Rising, but some buildings survived and others have been restored. It was pedestrianised in 1980.

== History ==
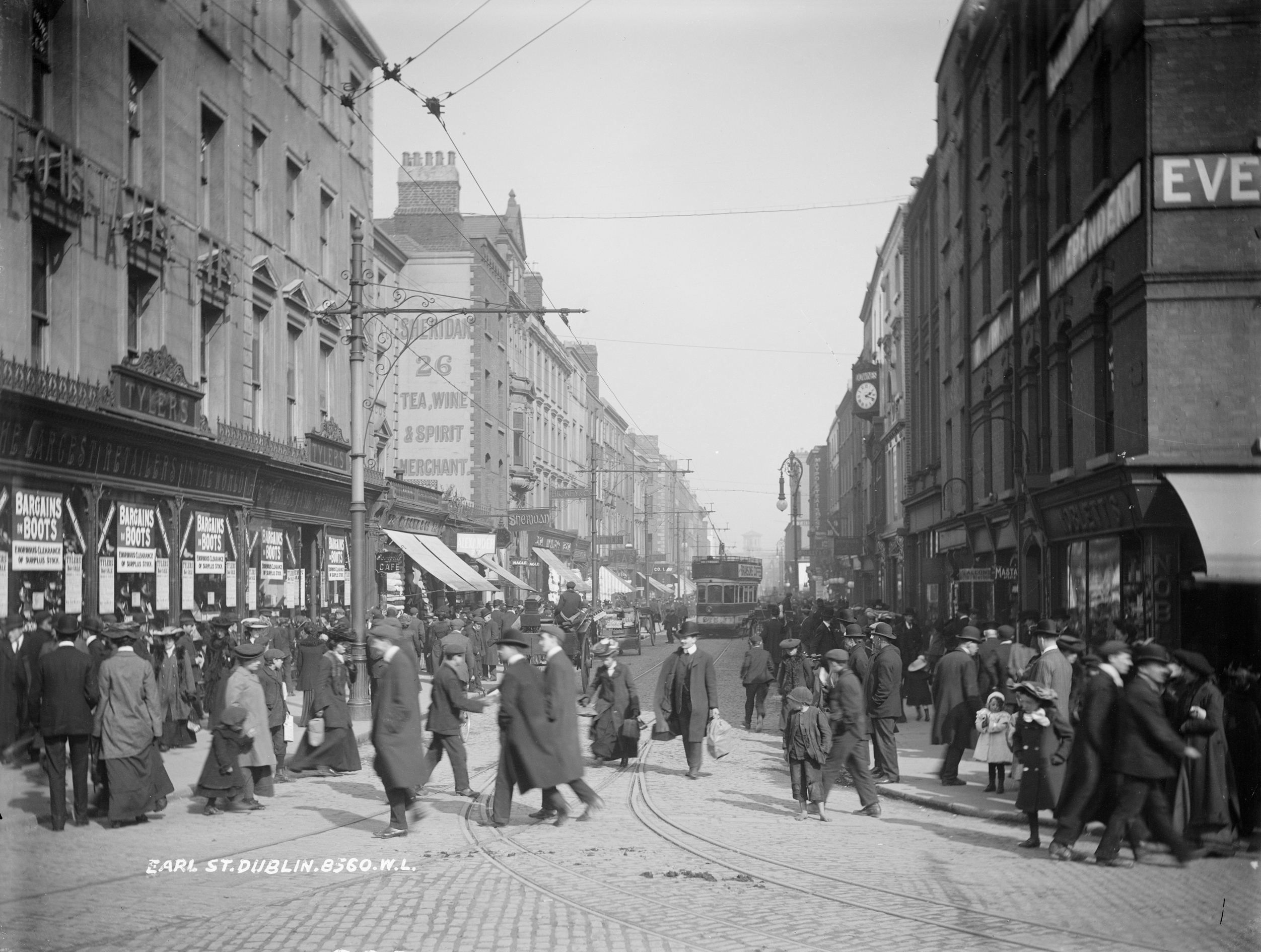
Earl Street North c. 1900

The street was built on land previously owned by St. Mary's Abbey. It was acquired by Henry Moore, 1st Earl of Drogheda in 1614 and sold to Luke Gardiner in 1714. It was developed in the late 18th century and named after the earl whose estate lands and developments are reflected in the street names bearing his name, Henry Street, Moore Street, Of Lane (now Off Lane) and Drogheda Street. North Earl Street was a direct continuation of Henry Street eastwards. It was sometimes formerly called Earl Street North.

The Dublin Tramways Company built a tramline in the 1870s which ran along the street, continuing onto Talbot Street to Amiens Street and north to Dollymount and beyond. Alexander Thom of Thom's Directory moved his printing business to 21 North Earl Street in 1828, where he operated a shop as a printer, bookseller and stationer.

=== Easter Rising and Independence ===
During the Easter Rising in 1916, North Earl Street was badly damaged along with O'Connell Street and Henry Street. By the second day of the uprising, many of the buildings were on fire and businesses were being looted. Much of the street was reconstructed from 1917 onwards, with Edwardian Baroque or Empire Revival style by architects such as O'Callaghan & Webb. These buildings are characterised by their use of classical facades with brick and granite. Madigans Pub was also rebuilt at this time, and contains some stained-glass windows by Harry Clarke. During this rebuilding, Dublin Corporation widened parts of both North Earl Street and Henry Street. In total, 11 buildings on the Street and a further 3 on Earl Place needed full reconstruction.

Some of the Georgian buildings further away from the junction with O'Connell Street survived 1916, and form part of the older streetscape. These include a townhouse on the corner of Marlborough Street from the late 1780s. Other buildings feature Victorian stucco fronts.

As part of a wider set of proposals to rename a number of Dublin streets in 1921, it was proposed that North Earl Street be renamed Brian Boru Street in a report by the Dublin Corporation street naming committee. This new naming scheme was not implemented.

=== Regeneration ===
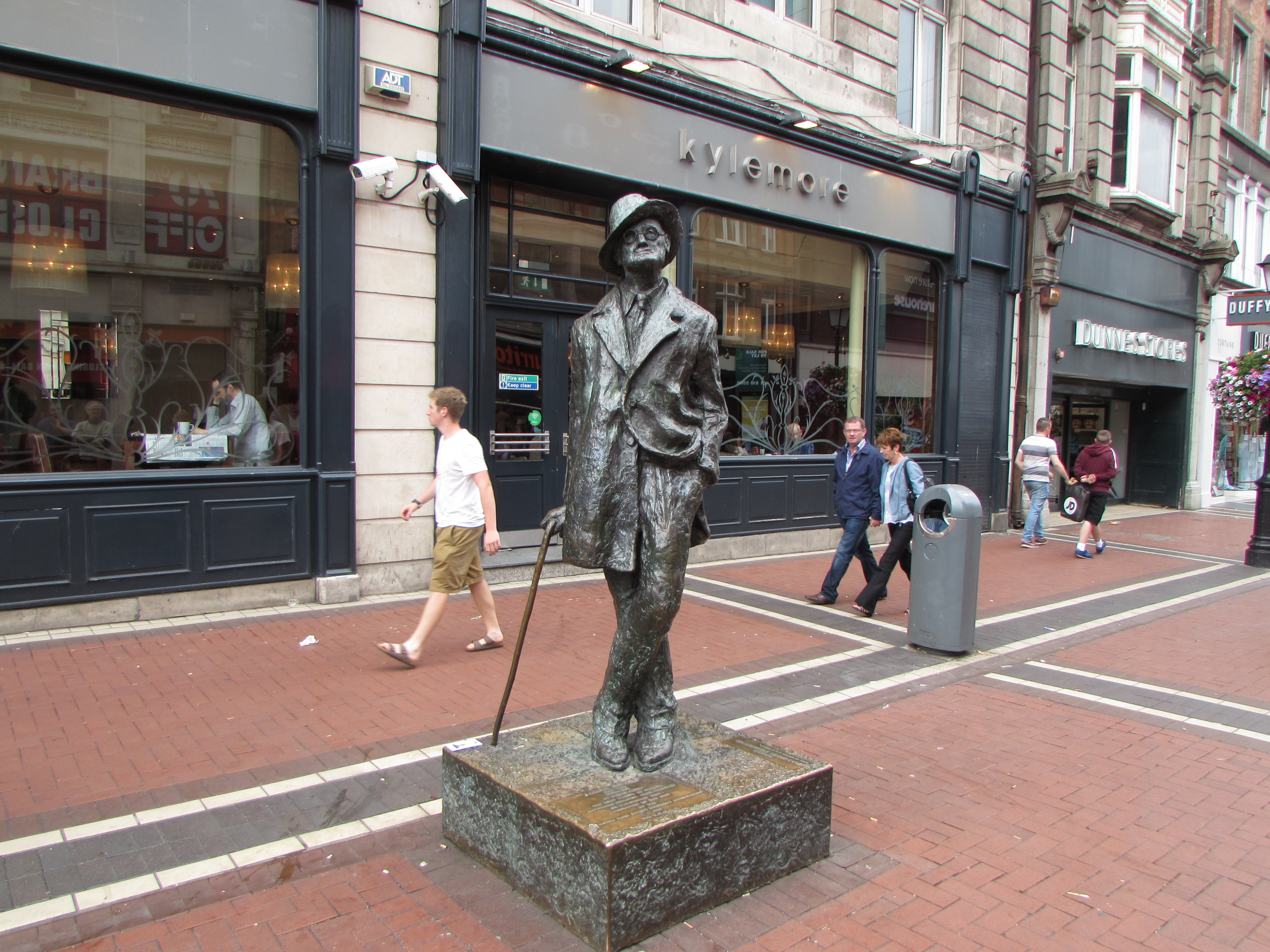
Statue of James Joyce

North Earl Street was pedestrianised in the 1980s along with a number of other city centre streets. It was officially opened as a "pedestrian precinct" in December 1980. A statue of James Joyce by Marjorie Fitzgibbon was installed on the street in 1990. It was commissioned by the Dublin City Centre Business Association and was unveiled on 16 June 1990. The statue is known colloquially as "the prick with the stick".

The hearing-aid store, Bonovox at 9 North Earl Street, is reputedly the inspiration for Paul Hewson's choice as Bono for his stage name.

From the 1960s, the department store Boyers & Co. operated from North Earl Street. It closed in 2016, and was redeveloped as a Sports Direct. During this time the street was characterised as dominated by discount stores and euro shops and a decline in the condition of the street. This followed the closure of Clerys in 2015, which also faces onto North Earl Street and Earl Place. This site went under development as the Clerys Quarter in 2019. These side entrances to the department store dated originally from 1979.
