= Talbot Mall =

Small shopping centre in central Dublin (1979-2022)

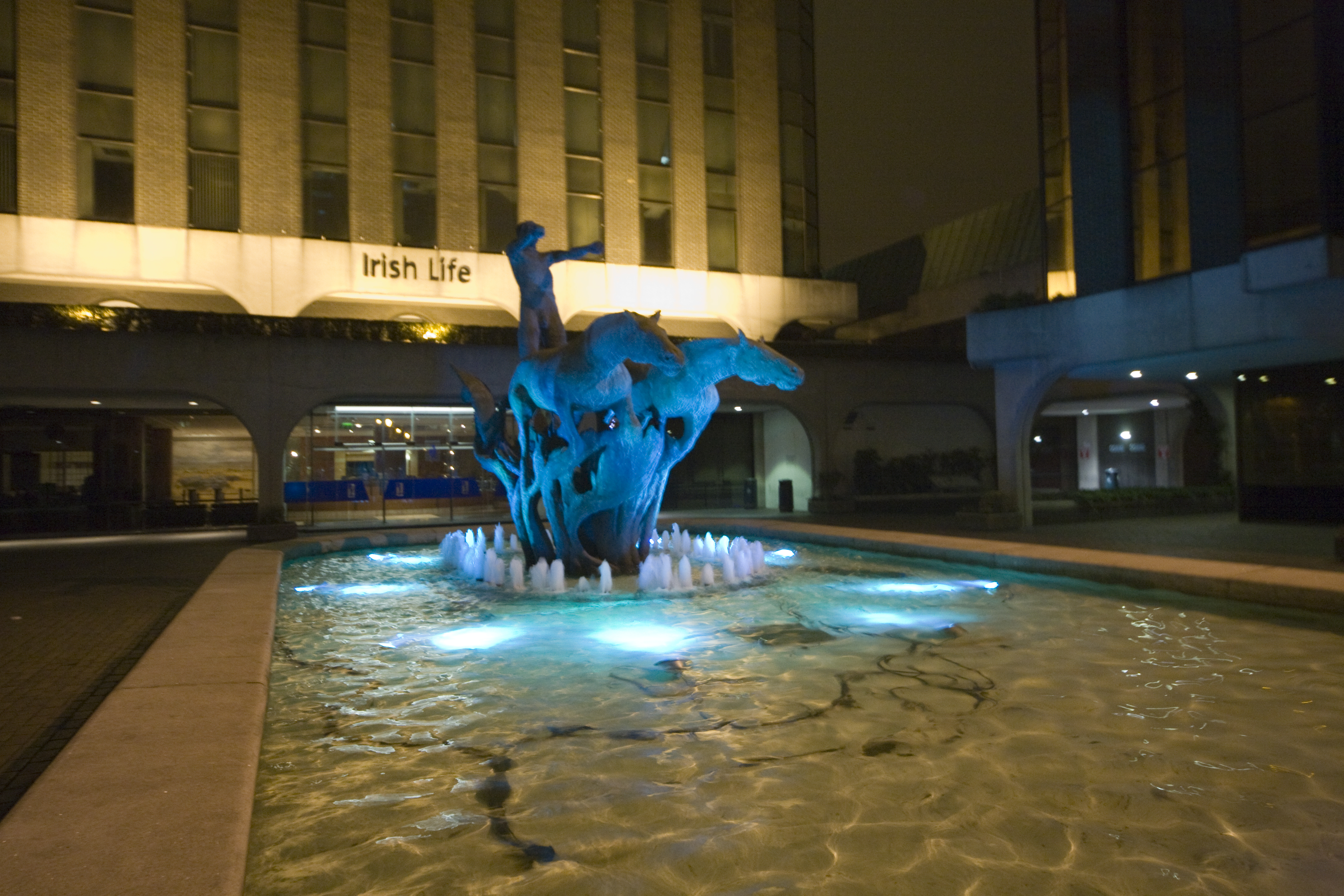
- Fountain in front of the Irish Life office core, near the mall's rear exit (2007) designed by Oisín Kelly
- Interactive map of the Talbot Mall area
- Former names: Irish Life Mall

General information
- Location: Dublin, Ireland, 1 Talbot Street; Dublin; Ireland
- Coordinates: 53°21′0.04″N 6°15′22.23″W
- Opening: 1 September 1979; 46 years ago

Design and construction
- Architects: Andrew Devane; Robinson Keefe Devane

Talbot Mall (formerly known as Irish Life Mall and later Irish Life Shopping Mall prior to a 2013 rebranding) was a small shopping arcade located between Talbot Street, Northumberland Square, and Abbey Street in Dublin, Ireland. Operating for some years with only a few trading units, it latterly primarily formed a public passage between Talbot and Abbey Streets. As of 2021, permission was granted for a development which would replace the mall with a single supermarket and close the public passage between the streets, and this proceeded in 2022.

== History ==
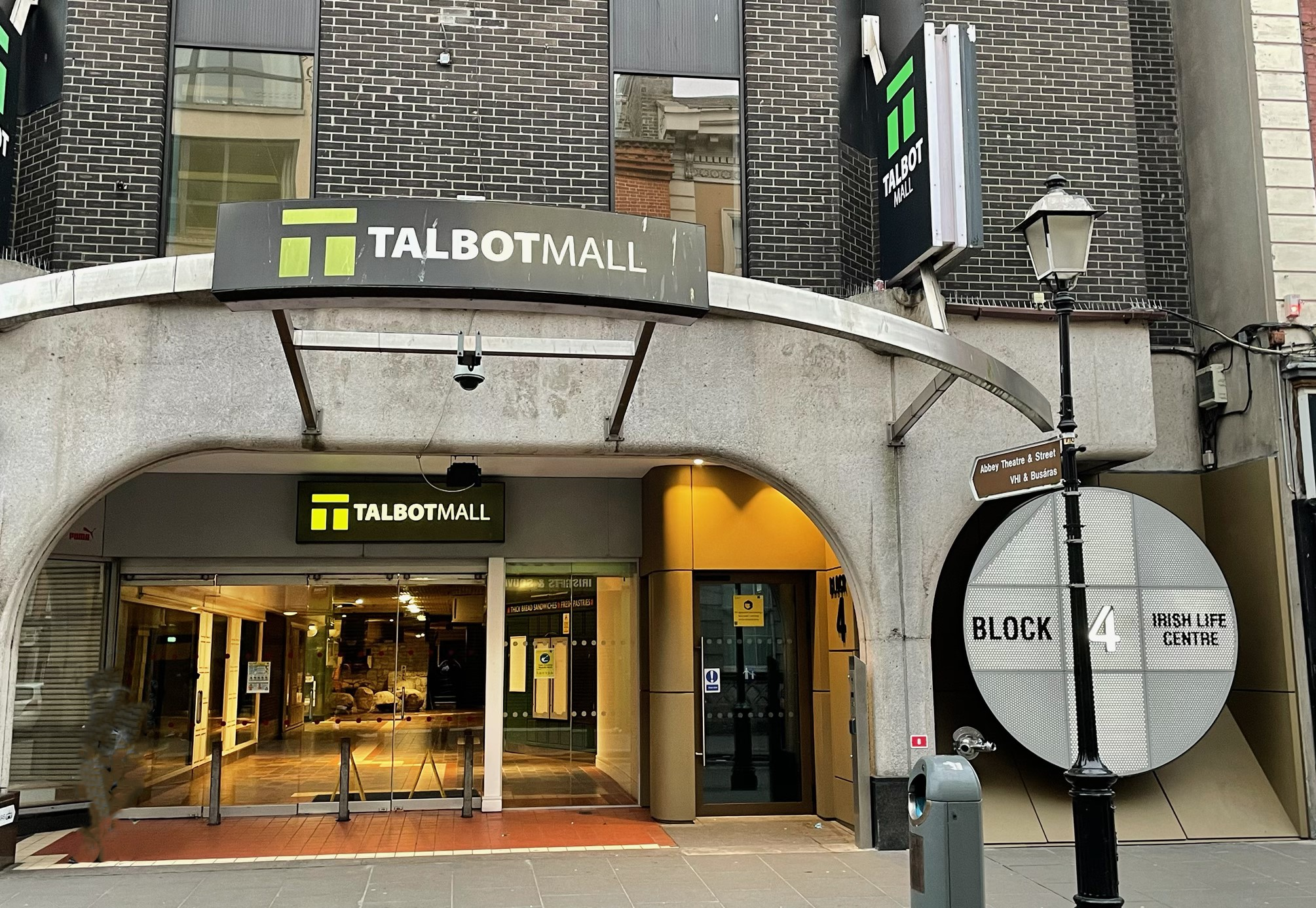
Main entrance to the mall

=== Development ===
Opened in September 1979 by the chairman of Ireland's largest life assurance company, Irish Life, the Irish Life Mall was a second-phase element of the nine-building Irish Life buildings complex, originally built between 1974 and 1977 and mostly comprising office space, as well as two blocks of apartments. The mall was constructed partially on the site of the Georgian era Marlborough Bowling Green.

The mall runs from the midpoint of Talbot Street to Northumberland Square and Abbey Street. It originally had two entrances on Talbot Street, with the passages merging at a central atrium; one entrance and passage were later absorbed into rental units. The mall's name was later expanded to Irish Life Shopping Mall. The complex was built on the former site of the Brook Thomas warehouse and timber yards along with other adjoining sites costing £900,000. The 14 artisan houses of Northumberland Square were demolished as part of the redevelopment.

Irish Life, now part of the Canadian multinational Great-West Lifeco, were the original developers, and later also part-owners of the first full-scale city centre shopping centre, the Ilac Centre on Henry Street. In 1985, Irish Life owned over 1.5 million square feet of office space in Dublin, making it the largest single freeholder in the city.

=== Fading and revival attempts ===
By 2012, few shop units remained in operation, and the shopping facility had come to function primarily as a pedestrian route between Abbey Street and the Luas stop, and Talbot Street. A consultancy firm was engaged to study the situation and in an attempt to recover business, the centre was renamed in April 2013 as the Talbot Mall, as part of a broader rebranding which also saw some vacant units redesigned with 3D-visuals to look like prospective shops. Permission was sought and obtained in 2016 to merge multiple retail units, and parts of the public mall space, into bigger shop units, and to add new toilet facilities.

=== Closure ===
As of March 2021 permission was sustained on appeal for a further development, which would end the operation of the mall, replacing it with a single Lidl supermarket, and extinguishing the passage between Talbot and Abbey Streets. In the application, Irish Life stated that the attempts to revive the mall had failed. This development proceeded in 2022.

== Tenants and facilities ==
The main entrance was on Talbot Street, leading to a short corridor, a central atrium with stairs to the car park, and a discreet rear passageway towards Abbey Street. The centre opened with 15 retail outlets. Past tenants of the shopping centre have included an Easons branch on Talbot Street, Dealz, a pharmacy, hair and beauty salon, jewellers, travel agency, drapery and Hugh O'Regan's Life Bar (which for a time operated as Floridita). For many years only a few outlets remained operational: two eating places (Brasilia Café and an O'Brien's Sandwich Bar), and one retail and one service unit. With the closure of the café in August 2019, the only remaining internal retail unit was the sandwich bar, though there was also a GP surgery.

== Irish Life Centre ==
The wider complex comprises nine buildings, two of which are primarily residential, the remainder mostly offering office space, with the mall running through the ground floor of one. The complex houses the principal offices of Irish Life, along with a fitness facility, including a swimming pool, and in addition to Comreg, the Irish Communications Regulator, and the Valuation Office of Ireland. The residential element comprises 50 apartments. The lead architect was Andrew Devane and the cost of the centre, before the setup of the shopping centre, was 20 million Irish pounds. The brickwork, use of white aggregate for the arches, and tinted glazing are similar to Devane's Stephen Court building on St Stephen's Green.

A sculpture by Oisín Kelly was at first directly in front of the Irish Life HQ building but was later moved to be closer to, and more visible from, Abbey Street. This plaza area features a dry moat, with retractable walkways which can be drawn up at night.

There is an underground car park, which opened with 375 spaces, with accesses on Abbey Street and Gardiner Street.
