= Semicentennial of the Easter Rising =

Fiftieth anniversary commemoration of Irish Easter Rising

The Semi-centennial of the Easter Rising in Ireland occurred in 1966. Many events took place to mark the events of 1916.

== Easter Sunday ==
Celebrations began on Easter Sunday on April 10, 1966 when a Military parade took place in Dublin. An estimated 200,000 people attended the march as it paraded down O'Connell Street before stopped outside the General Post Office, the headquarters of the 1916 Easter Rising leaders. The then Irish president Éamon de Valera took the salute with an estimated 900 veterans of the Easter Rising by his side.

Later in the day, the president laid a wreath at Kilmainham Gaol, the execution site of the leaders. The museum was officially opened.

== Easter Monday ==
Religious services were held across the country on Easter Monday in remembrance of the veterans of the Rising. The Garden of Remembrance in Parnell Square was opened by the President and later in the day Radio Éireann presented a live commemorative concert that was held live at the Gaiety Theatre.

== Commemorative coin ==
During Semi-centennial celebrations, the first Commemorative coins of Ireland known simply as the Ten shilling coin was issued. The coin was designed by Thomas Humphrey Paget and was valued at 10 shillings, therefore having the highest value coin in the pre-decimal system.
