= Oisín Kelly =

Irish sculptor

- Born: Austin Kelly; 17 May 1915; Dublin, Ireland
- Died: 12 October 1981 (aged 66); Kilkenny
- Education: Trinity College, Dublin
- Movement: Sculpture

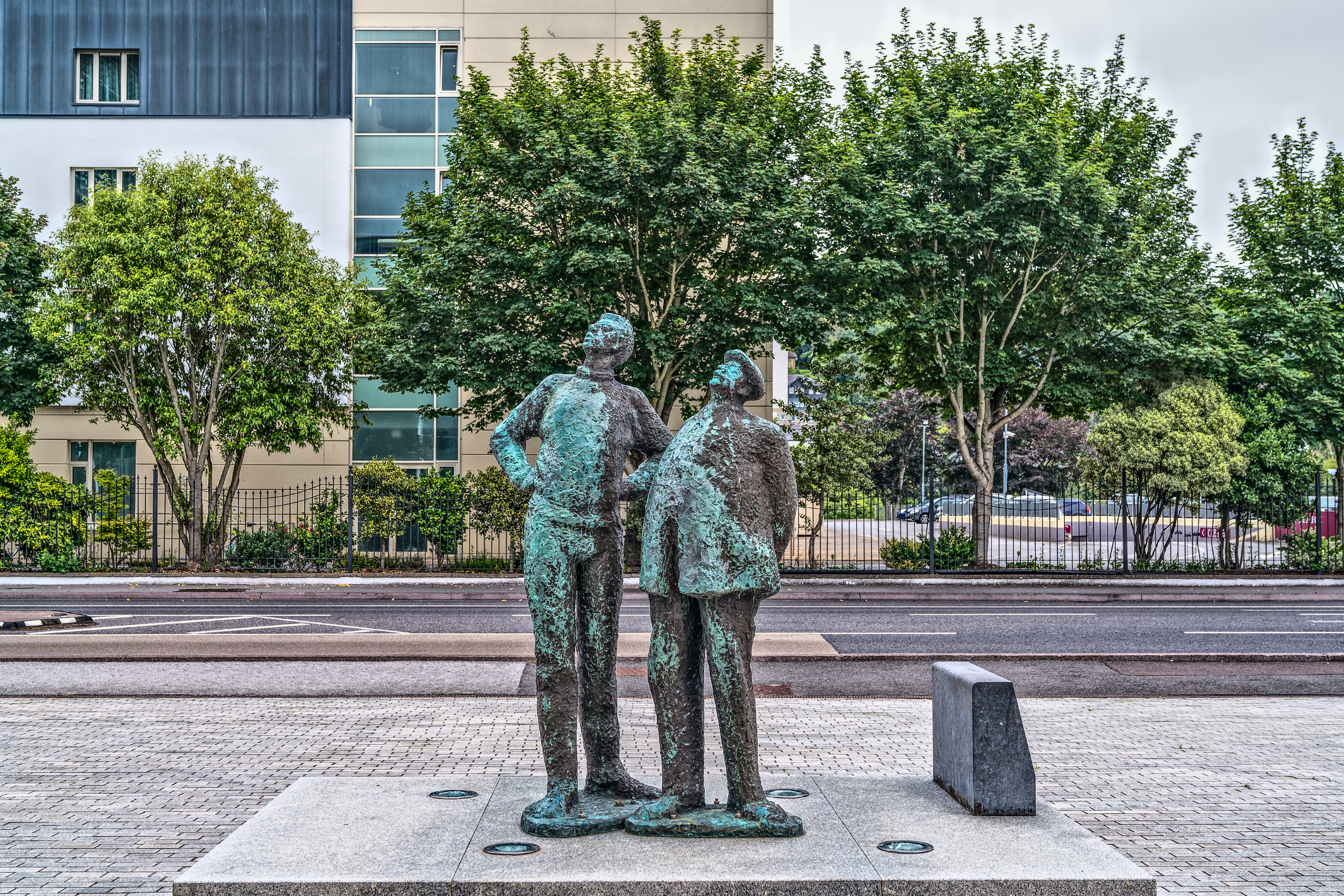
Two Working Men in Cork (1969)

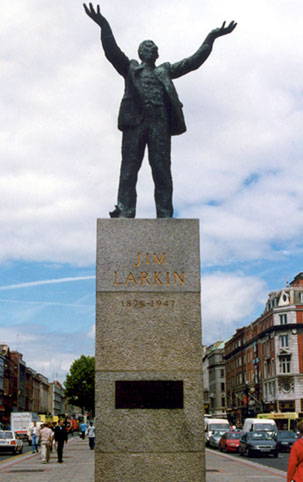
Statue of James Larkin on O'Connell Street (1977)

Oisín Kelly (17 May 1915 – 12 October 1981) was an Irish sculptor.

== Life and career ==
Oisín Kelly was born as Austin Kelly in Dublin, the son of William (Willy) Kelly, principal of the James's Street National School, and his wife, Elizabeth (née McLean). He studied languages at Trinity College, Dublin. Until he became an artist in residence at the Kilkenny Design Centre in 1966, he worked as a teacher of Art, English, Irish and French from 1943 to 1964 at St Columba's College, Dublin. He initially attended night class at the National College of Art and Design and studied briefly (1948–1949) at Chelsea Polytechnic in London under Henry Moore.

He originally concentrated on small wood carvings and his early commissions were mostly for Roman Catholic churches. He became well known after he was commissioned to do a sculpture, The Children of Lir (1964), for Dublin's Garden of Remembrance, opened in 1966 on the 50th anniversary of the Easter Rising. More outdoor/public commissions followed, including the statue of James Larkin on Dublin's O'Connell Street. and the 1966 carved Last Supper on the front of St. Theresa's church in Sion Mills, County Tyrone.

He figures in five lines of Seamus Heaney's second "Glanmore Sonnet":

"'These things are not secrets but mysteries',/Oisin Kelly told me years ago/In Belfast, hankering after stone/That connived with the chisel, as if the grain/Remembered what the mallet tapped to know."

== Works on display ==
- The Children of Lir (1964) Garden of Remembrance, Dublin 1
- Two Working Men (1969) by County Hall, Cork
- Roger Casement (1971) Ballyheigue village, County Kerry
- Jim Larkin (1977) O'Connell Street, Dublin 1
- Chariot of Life (1982) Irish Life Centre, Lower Abbey Street, Dublin 169

A bronze monument by sculptor Oisin Kelly depicting Turlough O'Carolan playing his harp was erected on a plinth at the Market Square, Mohill, on 10 August 1986, and was unveiled by Patrick Hillery, President of Ireland.

== See also ==
- List of public art in Dublin
- List of public art in Cork city

== Sources ==
- Fergus Kelly (2015) The Life and Work of Oisín Kelly. Hacketstown, Co Carlow: Derreen Books. (ISBN 978-0-9933063-0-3)
- Fergus Kelly (2002) Kelly, Oisín, The Encyclopedia of Ireland. Dublin: Gill and Macmillan. (ISBN 0-7171-3000-2)
- Judith Hill (1998) Irish public sculpture. Dublin: Four Courts Press. (ISBN 1-85182-274-7)
