= Ilac Centre =

Shopping centre in central Dublin, Ireland

- Location: Dublin, Ireland
- Coordinates: 53°21′00″N 6°15′50″W
- Address: Henry Street, Dublin 1
- Opened: November 12, 1981; 44 years ago
- Owner: Hammerson
- Website: www.ilac.ie

The Ilac Centre is a shopping centre, located in central Dublin, north of the River Liffey. It has entrances opening onto Henry Street, Parnell Street and Moore Street.

The centre is anchored by Dunnes Stores, TK Maxx and Normal, with Chemist Warehouse being a mid-anchor.

== History ==
=== Planning and development ===
To construct the new shopping centre, a network of laneways and alleys were demolished, including Riddle's Row, Cole's Lane, and Little Denmark Street, the street from which 2RN had broadcast first in 1926.

Four markets were lost, Norfolk Market, Rotunda Market, Taaffe's Market, and Anglesea Market which was known for its second-hand clothes. The streets were populated densely with shops, while the western side of Moore Street were surviving buildings from the Easter Rising in 1916. In total over 100 buildings were demolished to make way for the new development. The existing street traders on Moore Street were not consulted about the new shopping centre and the changes to the area. Having acquired the plot by a compulsory purchase order, the Dublin Corporation sought to develop the site with 400,000 square feet of retail space, 300,000 square feet of office space in two 14-storey blocks, a theatre, 2 cinemas, restaurants and bars.

To realise the plan the Corporation awarded the development contract to Irish Life. Construction began in late 1978, with a much reduced footprint of 200,000 square feet total, having left the site derelict for 4 years. The library was opened in 1985.

=== Opening ===
The Ilac Centre was opened in 1981, and was one of the first shopping centres in Dublin city centre. It has been characterised as a "large, low and dull cruciform" shopping complex. It was designed by David Keane & Partners in 1977. The centre is owned by Hammerson and Irish Life Assurance plc. The name was made up from the initial letters of the company as it was then known - Irish Life Assurance Company. Irish Life also previously owned the Irish Life Mall on Talbot Street. It was a scaled back project from the initial 50 acre development proposed by Nathaniel Lichfield, an English master planner, in the mid-1960s.

When it opened, it was the first shopping centre in Ireland to have glass lifts, which have since been closed. The shopping centre was refurbished in 2006, with improvements including the raising of ceilings and shop fronts.

In 8 July 2026, Hammerson took on full ownership of the centre.

== Facilities ==
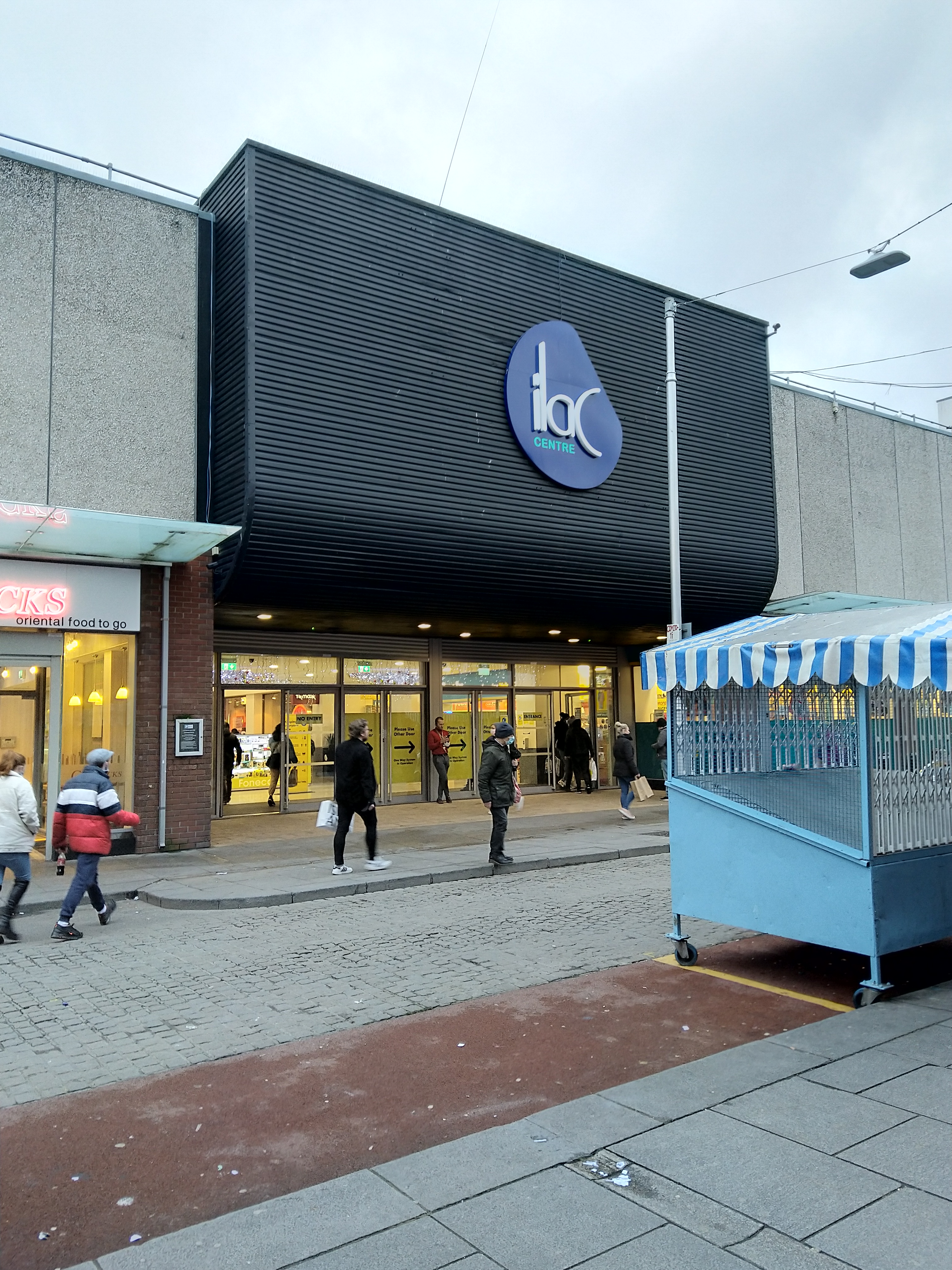
Ilac Centre, Moore Street in 2020

The centre has over 80 shops. The first floor of the centre is occupied by Dublin's Central Library, which has language learning facilities, a Music Library and Business Library.

There is also a small chapel located in the shopping centre, which closed in 2019 after a disagreement between the centre's management and the Dublin Archdiocese over who was responsible for the chapel.
