= Garden of Remembrance (Dublin) =

Memorial garden in Dublin, Ireland

- An Gairdín Cuimhneacháin
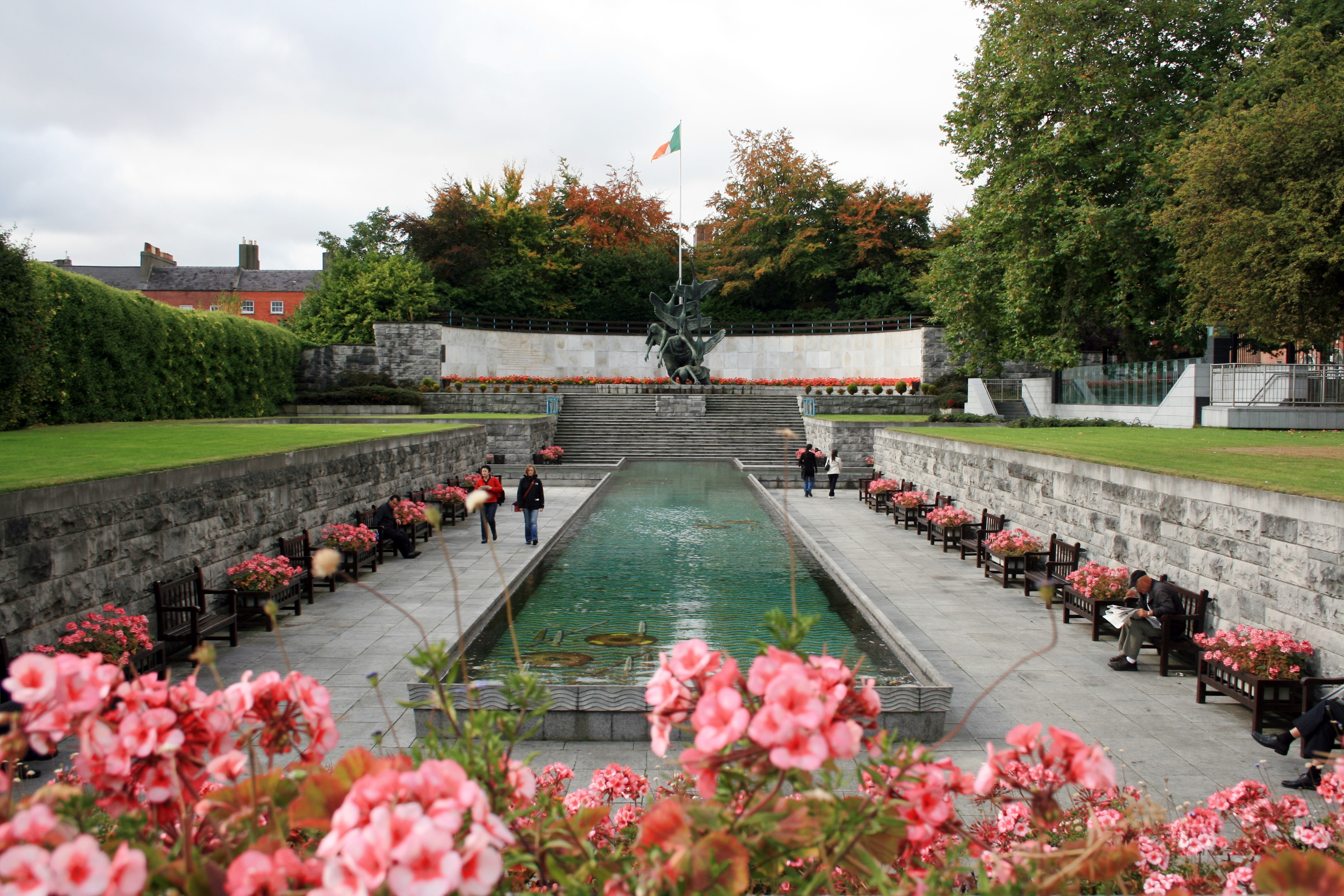
- A view of the garden in 2009
- Interactive map of Garden of Remembrance
- Location: Northern end of the former Rotunda Gardens within Parnell Square
- Coordinates: 53.353987°N 6.263853°W
- Designer: Dáithí Hanly
- Type: Memorial Garden
- Material: Granite, limestone
- Opening date: 1966
- Dedicated to: Irish freedom fighters from various uprisings and wars

The Garden of Remembrance (Irish: An Gairdín Cuimhneacháin) is a memorial garden in Dublin dedicated to the memory of "all those who gave their lives in the cause of Irish Freedom". It is located in the northern fifth of the former Rotunda Gardens in Parnell Square, a Georgian square at the northern end of O'Connell Street. The garden was opened by President Eamon de Valera during the semicentennial of the Easter Rising in 1966.

== History ==
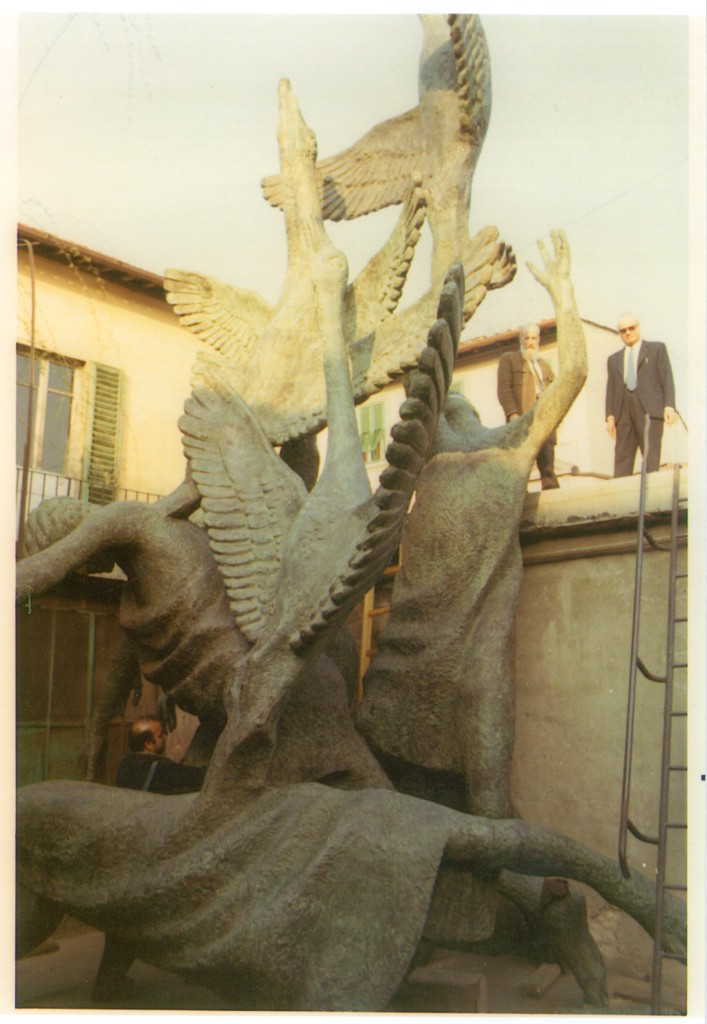
Children of Lir Monument by Oisin Kelly at the Ferdinando Marinelli Artistic Foundry, Florence, Italy

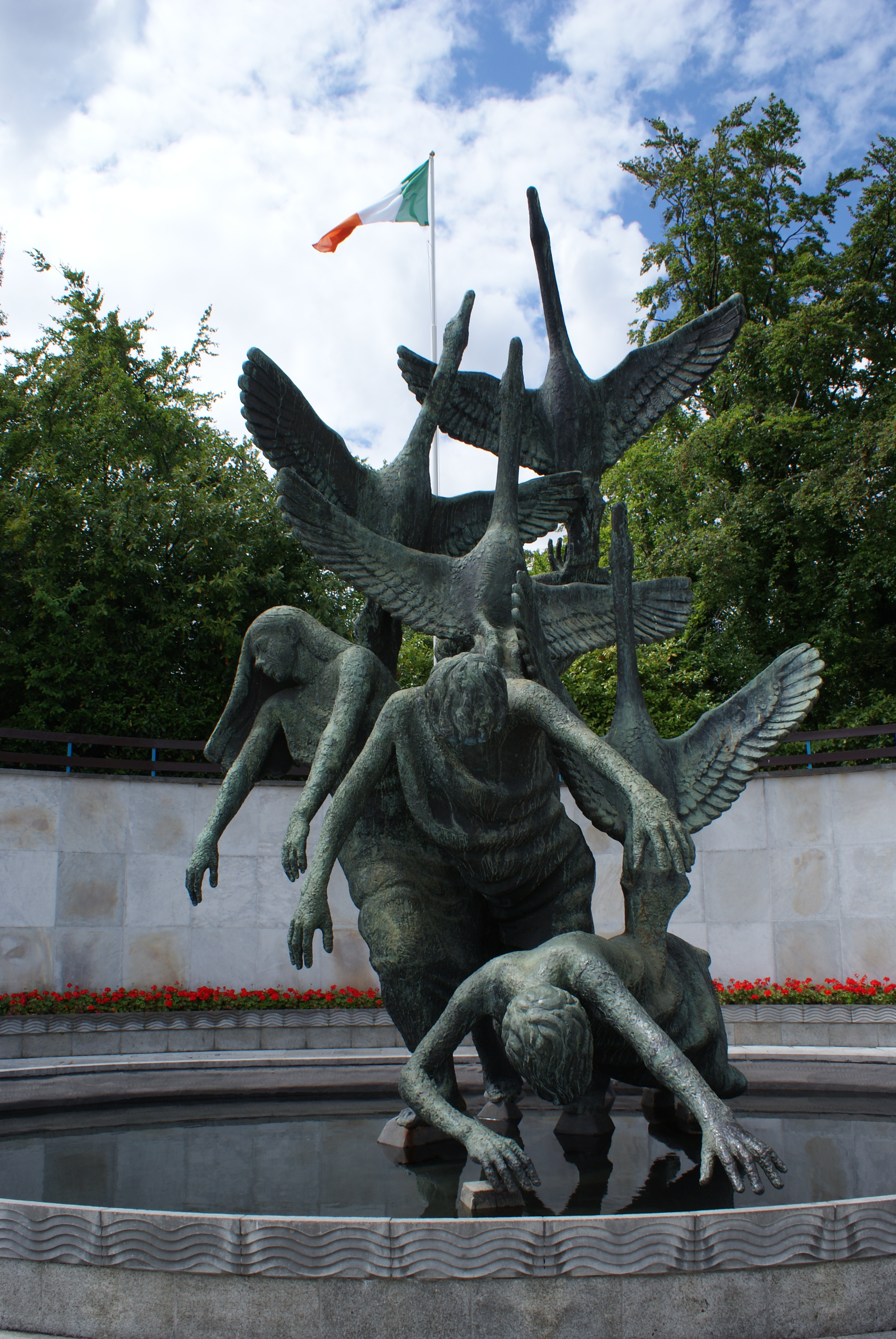
Children of Lir sculpture

The site of the Garden is where the Irish Volunteers were founded in 1913, and where several leaders of the 1916 Rising were held overnight before being taken to Kilmainham Gaol. The creation of such a memorial garden was first suggested in 1937 by Seán McEntee, the Minister for Finance. The site was also chosen due to its proximity to 41 Parnell Square, where Óglaigh na hÉireann was founded and plans for the Rising were discussed at meetings. The northern portion of the former Rotunda Gardens, originally designed by Robert Stevenson for Bartholomew Mosse in 1749, were purchased from the hospital in 1939.

World War II and the use of the site to erect a temporary paediatric unit during a period of increased infant mortality in the 1940s delayed the construction of the garden. During this time, the site was also considered for the construction of a new national concert hall. The Office of Public Works launched a competition for a garden of remembrance proposal in January 1946. In December 1950, it was announced that architect, Dáithi Hanly, has been selected as the designer. Final costs of £30,000 were approved, and following design revisions and tendering, construction began in February 1961.

President Éamon de Valera opened the Garden on 10 April 1966 on the fiftieth anniversary of the 1916 Easter Rising, in which he had been a commander. The opening ceremony began with a military parade from the GPO on O'Connell Street, with 900 veterans from 1916 taking part. During the ceremony, Archbishop John Charles McQuaid blessed the gardens.

The Garden commemorates freedom fighters from various Irish republican wars and uprisings, including:

- the 1798 rebellion of the Society of United Irishmen
- the 1803 rebellion of Robert Emmet
- the 1848 rebellion of Young Ireland
- the 1867 rising of the Fenian Brotherhood
- the 1916 Easter Rising of the Irish Volunteers and the Irish Citizen Army
- the 1919–21 Irish War of Independence of the Irish Republican Army

== Design ==
The garden is in the form of a sunken cruciform water-feature, constructed by John Sisk to Hanley's revised designs. The water feature is lined with tile mosaics with designs featuring spears, shields, and swords. Hanley had originally included space for a sculpture, but had intended for it to be of Éire. Its focal point is a statue of the Children of Lir by Oisín Kelly, symbolising rebirth and resurrection, added in 1971, cast in the Ferdinando Marinelli Artistic Foundry of Florence, Italy. The delay between the engagement of Kelly in 1959, and the installation of the statue in 1971 was due to Kelly's development of his own ideas inspired by W. B. Yeats' writing and the story of the Children of Lir. The final design was approved by the Arts Council in 1965, at which time it was too late for it to be read for the opening of the garden in 1966. It was unveiled by Taoiseach Jack Lynch in July 1971.

In 1976, a contest was held to find a poem which could express the appreciation and inspiration of this struggle for freedom. The winner was Dublin-born author Liam Mac Uistín, whose poem "We Saw a Vision", an aisling style poem, is written in Irish, French, and English on the stone wall of the monument. The aisling ("vision") form was used in eighteenth-century poems longing for an end to Ireland's miserable condition.

In the darkness of despair we saw a vision,
We lit the light of hope and it was not extinguished.
In the desert of discouragement we saw a vision.
We planted the tree of valour and it blossomed.
In the winter of bondage we saw a vision.
We melted the snow of lethargy and the river of resurrection flowed from it.
We sent our vision aswim like a swan on the river. The vision became a reality.
Winter became summer. Bondage became freedom and this we left to you as your inheritance.
O generations of freedom remember us, the generations of the vision.

— "We Saw A Vision"

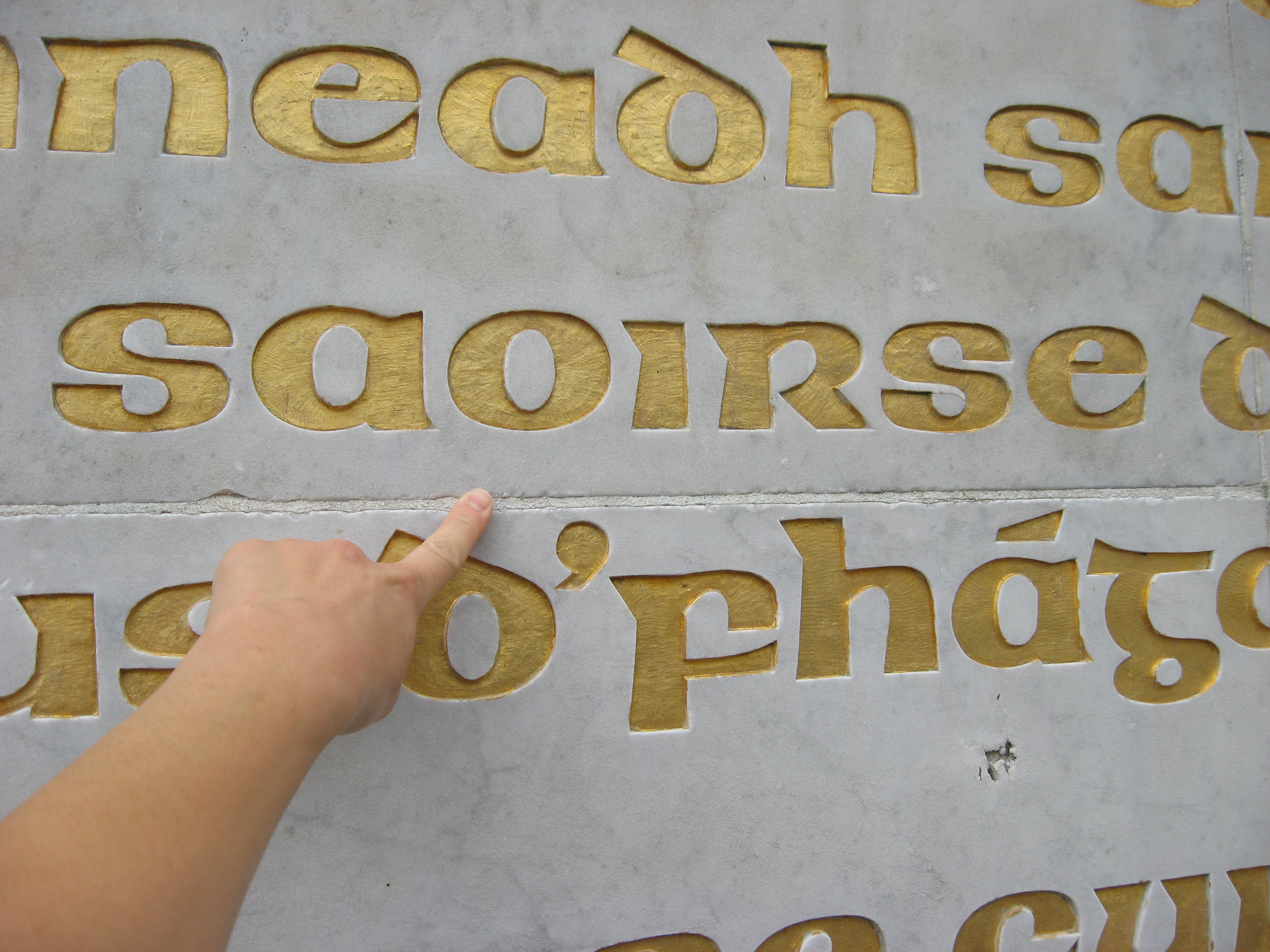
Saoirse (freedom in the Irish language) in the aisling in the Garden of Remembrance.

In Irish the poem reads:

I ndorchacht an éadóchais rinneadh aisling dúinn.
Lasamar solas an dóchais agus níor múchadh é.
I bhfásach an lagmhisnigh rinneadh aisling dúinn.
Chuireamar crann na crógachta agus tháinig bláth air.
I ngeimhreadh na daoirse rinneadh aisling dúinn.
Mheileamar sneachta na táimhe agus rith abhainn na hathbheochana as.
Chuireamar ár n-aisling ag snámh mar eala ar an abhainn. Rinneadh fírinne den aisling.
Rinneadh samhradh den gheimhreadh. Rinneadh saoirse den daoirse agus d'fhágamar agaibhse mar oidhreacht í.
A ghlúnta na saoirse cuimhnígí orainne, glúnta na haislinge...

— "An Aisling"

In 2004, it was suggested that as part of the redesign of the square the Garden of Remembrance itself might be redesigned. This led to the construction of a new entrance on the garden's northern side in 2007.

Queen Elizabeth II laid a wreath in the Garden of Remembrance during her state visit in May 2011, a gesture that was much praised in the Irish media, and which was also attended, upon invitation, by the widow and the daughter of the garden's designer Dáithí Hanly.

=== Gallery ===
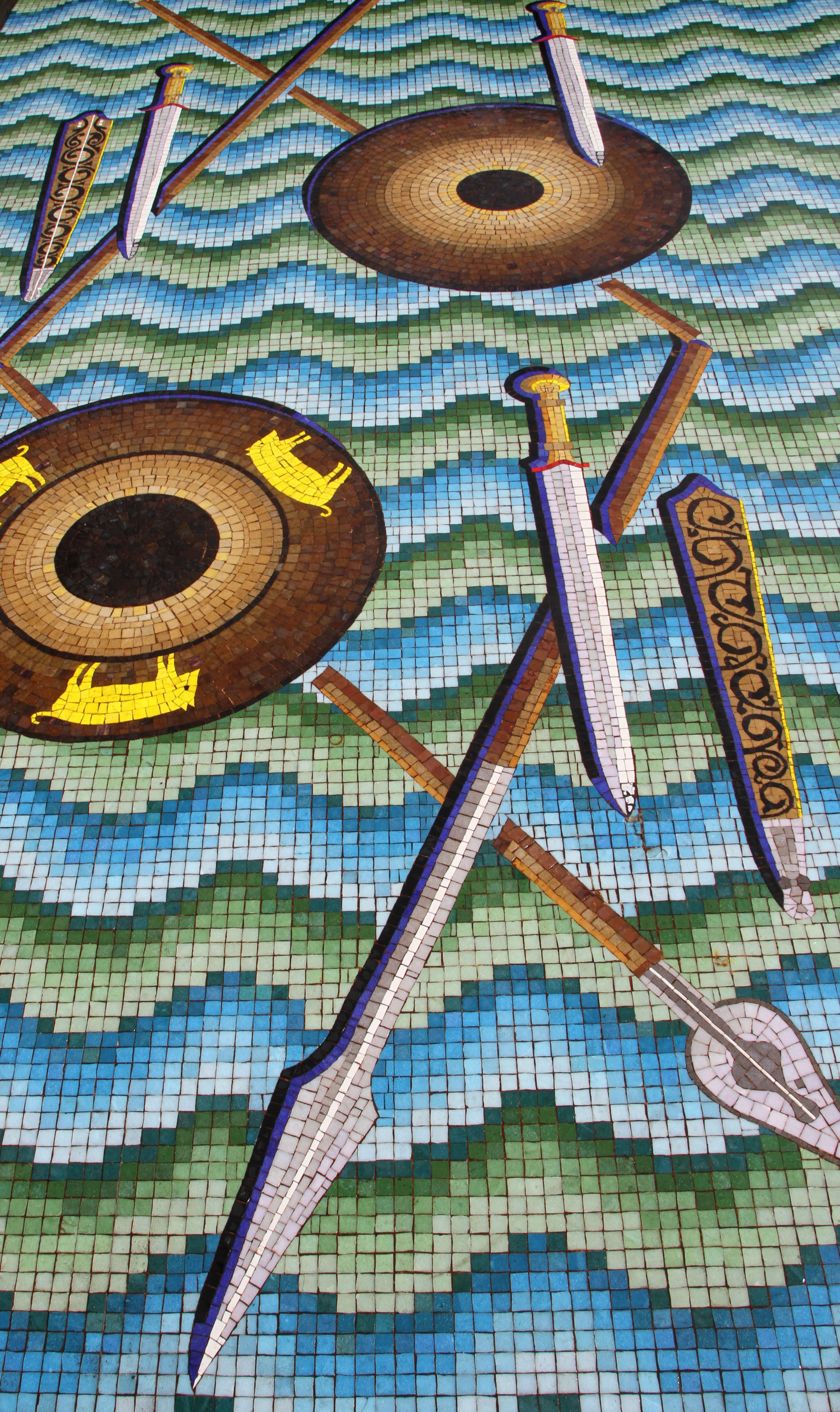
In Celtic custom, on concluding a battle, the weapons were broken and cast in the river, to signify the end of hostilities

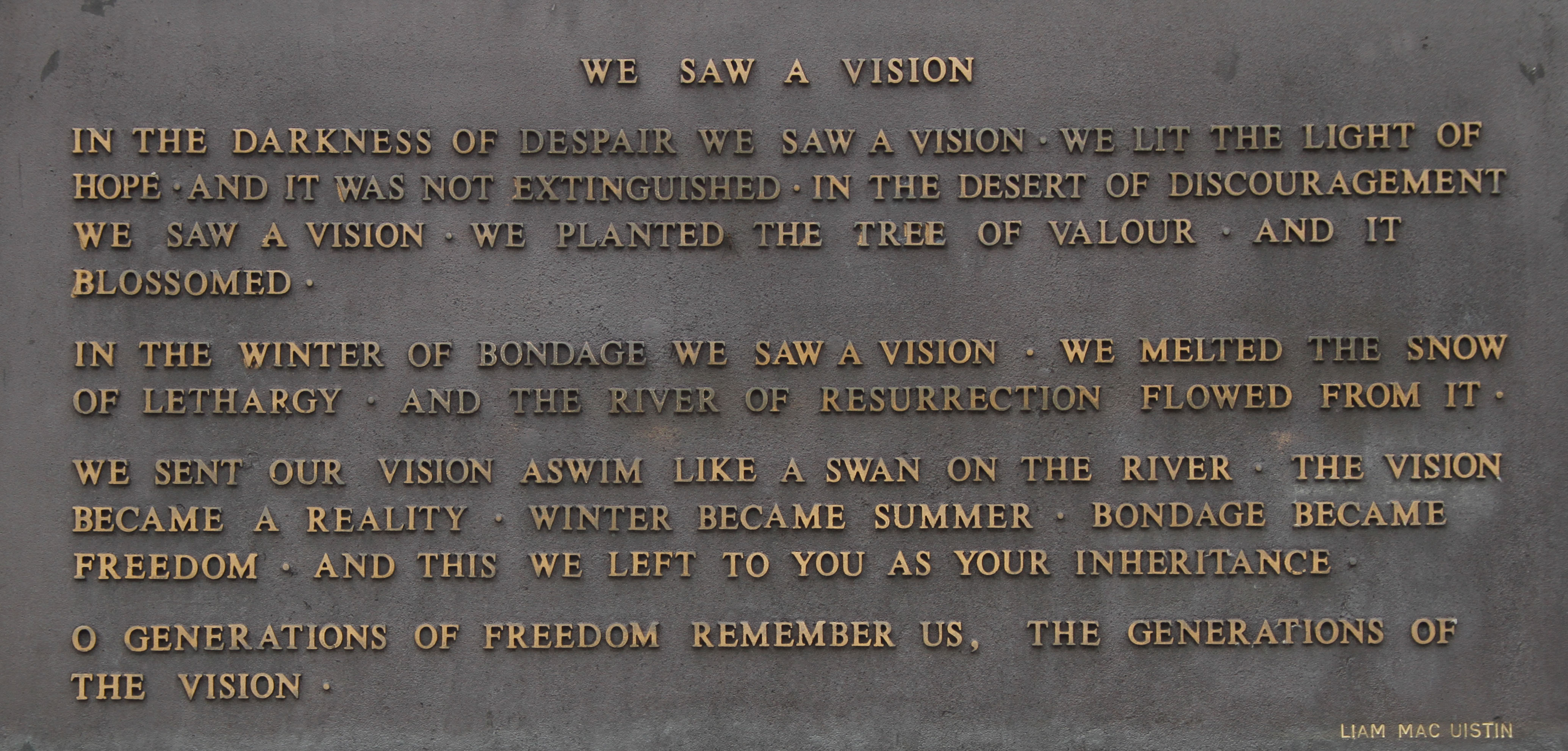
"We Saw a Vision" by Liam Mac Uistín

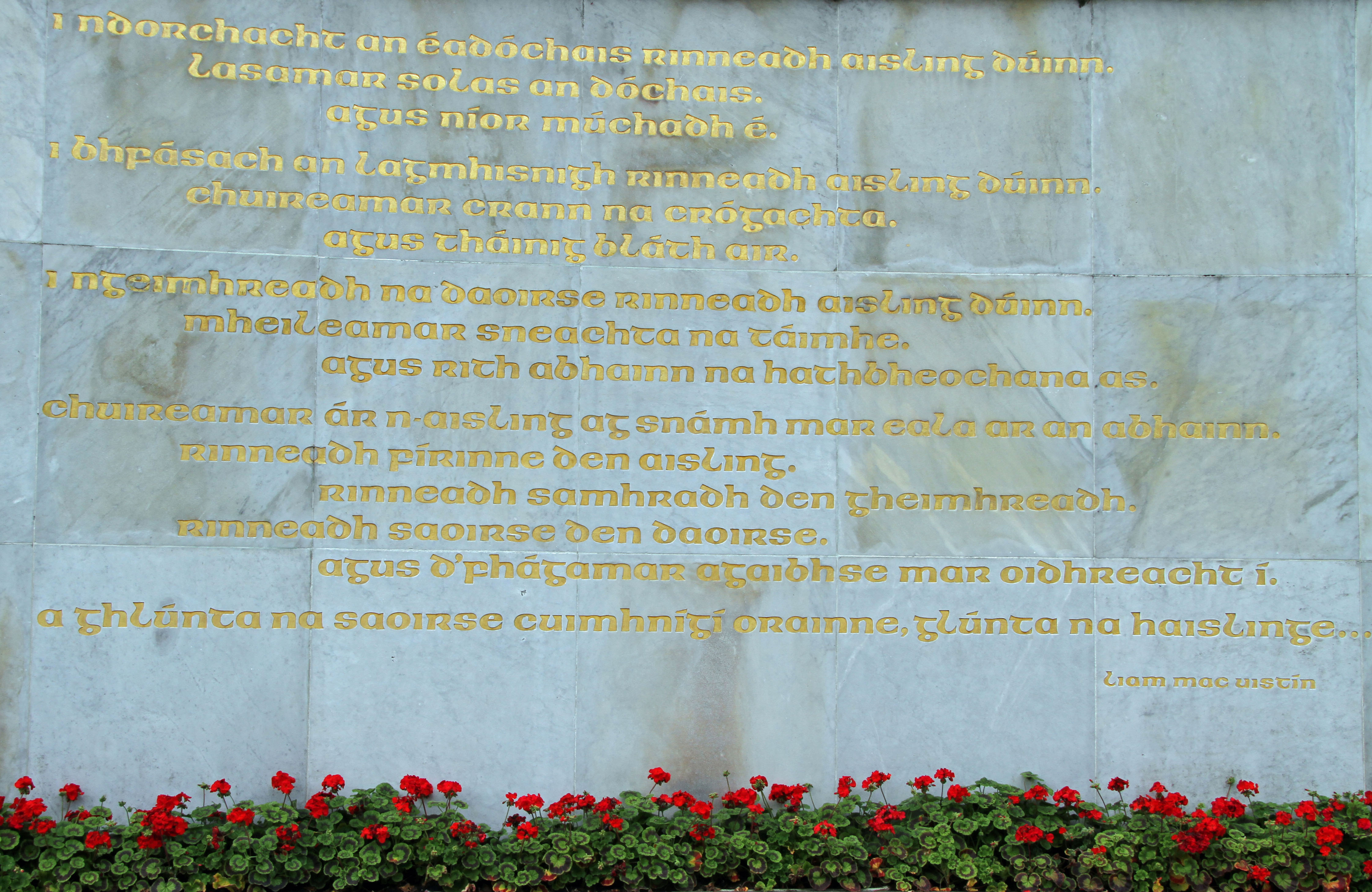
"An Aisling" by Liam Mac Uistín

== See also ==
- Irish National War Memorial Gardens, to Irish soldiers who fought and died in Irish regiments of the Allied armies in World War I
