= Talbot Street =

Street in central Dublin, Ireland

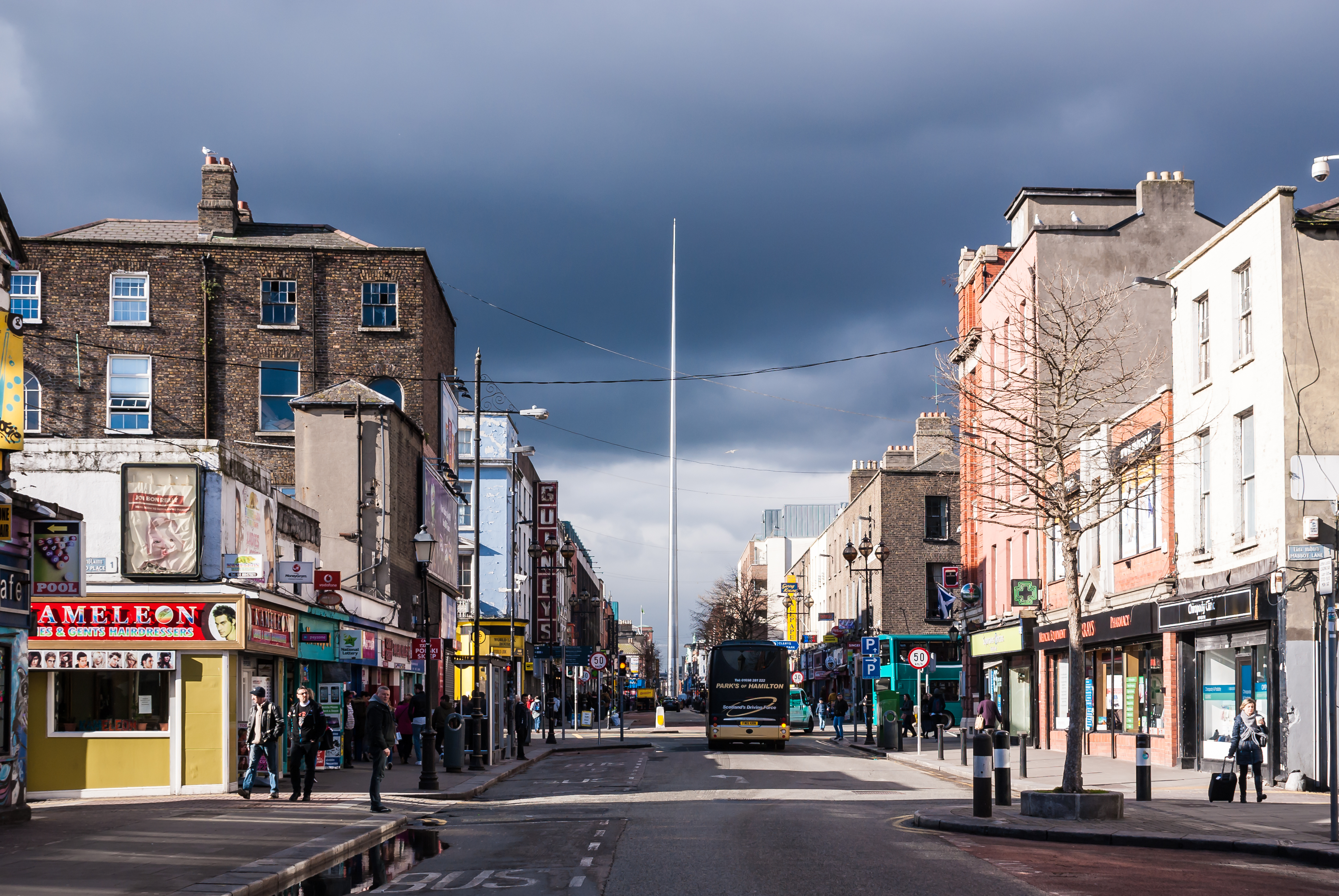
- The street in 2017 with the Spire of Dublin visible

- Location within Central Dublin
- Native name: Sráid Thalbóid (Irish)
- Former name: Cope Street (North) (from at least 1791 until 1821)
- Namesake: Charles Chetwynd-Talbot, 2nd Earl Talbot
- Length: 550 m (1,800 ft)
- Width: 18 metres (59 ft)
- Location: Dublin, Ireland
- Postal code: D01
- Coordinates: 53°21′3″N 6°15′14″W
- west end: North Earl Street, Marlborough Street
- east end: Amiens Street

Talbot Street (/ˈtɔːlbət/; Irish: Sráid Thalbóid) is a city-centre street located on Dublin's Northside, stretching from Amiens Street and bookended by Dublin Connolly railway station to North Earl Street, which acts as a continuation as far as the Spire of Dublin on Dublin's O'Connell Street.

The street is bisected by Lower Gardiner Street.

== History ==
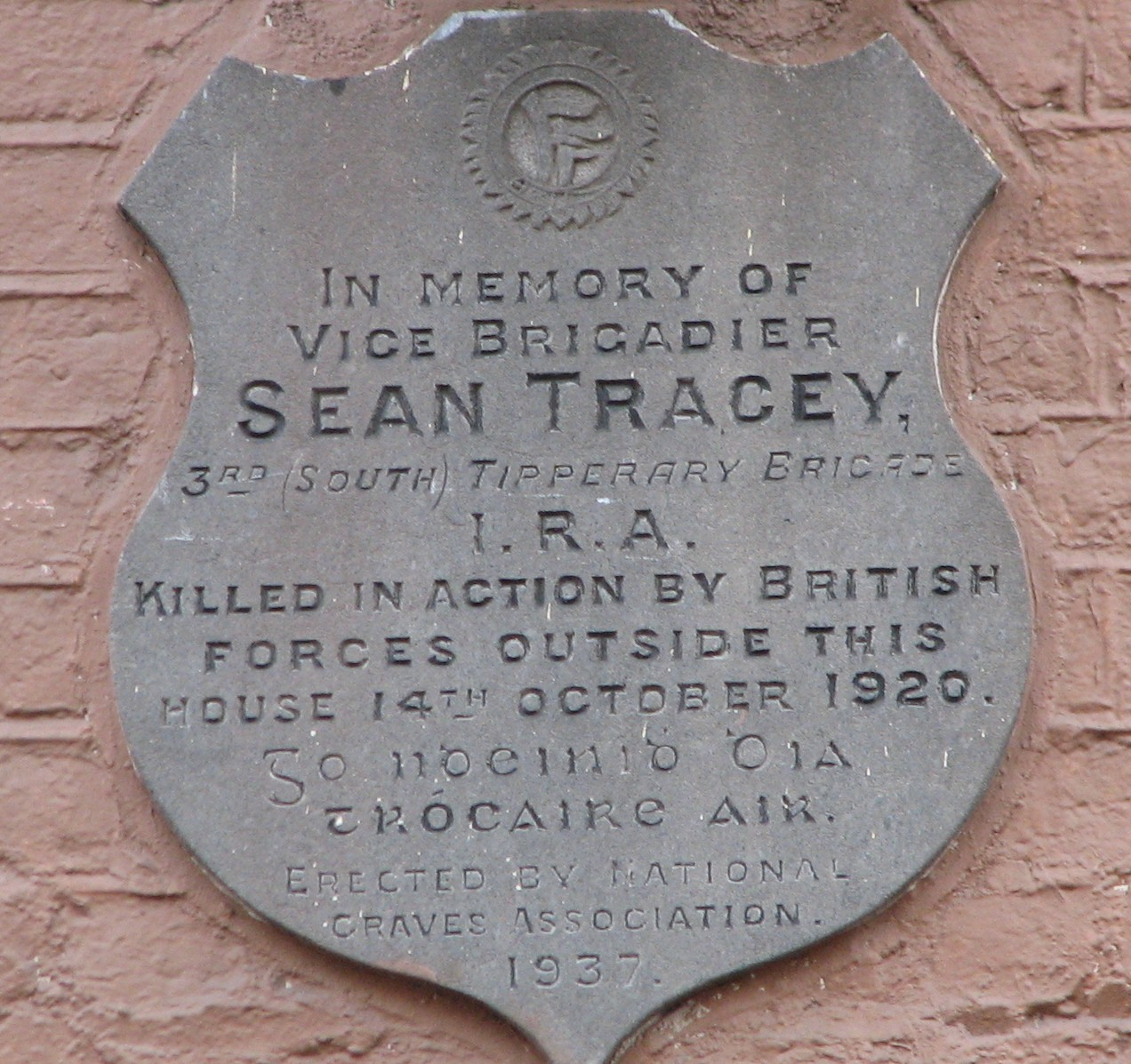
Seán Tracey Commemorative plaque in Dublin's Talbot Street

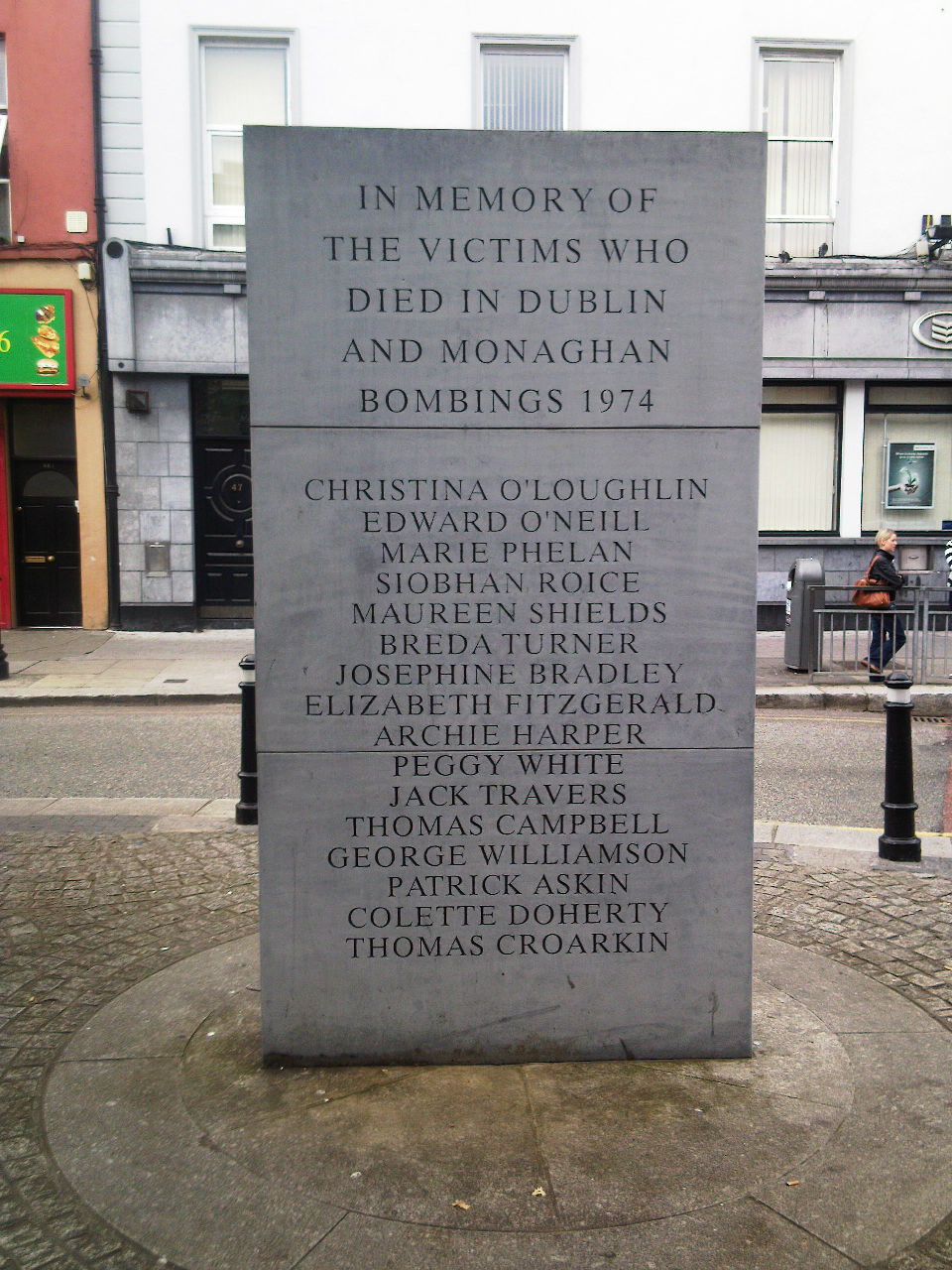
The front of the memorial erected in Talbot Street to commemorate the 33 victims of the 1974 Dublin and Monaghan bombings

The street does not appear named on John Rocque's map of Dublin of 1756 but rather is a small lane connecting to Marlborough Bowling Green.

In Wilson's map of 1791 and Bernard Scale's map of 1798 (which built on John Rocque's earlier plan), the street is detailed as Cope Street. It ran parallel to nearby Moland Street to its south. The Moland family owned large areas of land in the area with the Deverell family, with Deverall Place and Moland Place remaining as extant place names.

The street was renamed in 1821 after Charles Chetwynd-Talbot, 2nd Earl Talbot, Lord Lieutenant of Ireland, from 1817 to 1821.

Construction of some of the major buildings on the street started around 1840, after the sale of Tyrone House and was further accelerated by the opening of the Dublin railway in 1846. An iron railway bridge, constructed in around 1890 by A. Handyside & Co. of Leeds, runs over the east end of the street. It was built for the Dublin, Wicklow & Wexford Railway line to Amiens Street.

In October 1920 republican Seán Treacy (also spelt Tracey) of County Tipperary was shot and killed outside the Republican Outfitters shop at number 94, having been spotted by British agents on clandestine patrol in the vicinity. A plaque of remembrance marks the spot and is the focus of an infrequent commemoration attended by large numbers of Tipperary people on the morning of the All-Ireland Hurling Final in years when the Tipperary team participate, thus underlining the close association of the Gaelic Athletic Association with Irish nationalism. In the 1930s, 40s and 50s there were a number of attempts to change the name of Talbot Street to Seán Treacy Street. In 1943, Dublin Corporation passed a motion urging a change of name subject to the support of the majority of ratepayers on Talbot Street. However, the ratepayers of the street voted not to rename the street.

One of the street's most famous residents was Alfie Byrne, ten times Lord Mayor of Dublin. Originally a publican, he purchased the Vernon Bar on Talbot Street in 1912.

Part of the Dublin and Monaghan Bombings occurred in Talbot Street on 17 May 1974, when one of three car bombs planted by Ulster loyalists exploded. In total, 33 people were killed by the bombings and around 250 were injured. The vehicles used in the bombings had been stolen from Belfast earlier. In 1993, the Ulster Volunteer Force (UVF) confirmed it had carried out the attacks.

In the 1980s, the solicitor Denis Murnaghan opened the Fiesta Club on the street. The club employed women as "Fiesta Fawns", similar to Playboy bunnys. The venture was ultimately unsuccessful.

=== Anwar-E-Madina mosque ===
In 2008, the Anwar-E-Madina mosque was given planning permission to open on Talbot Street, making it the first city centre mosque in Dublin. The mosque occupies the upper three floors of 8 and 9 Talbot Street. Objections were noted, but ultimately did not impact the decision of An Bord Pleanála.

== Architecture and major elements ==
Clusters of early Victorian brick houses survive, including numbers 12 to 19, 28 to 32, 70 to 71, and 77. Numbers 53, 54, 81 and 82 retain their 1860s stucco fronts. A Victorian pub also remains on the street, at number 74, on the corner of Store Street. The former Moran's Hotel at number 21 retains its 1923 low, classical frontage. Elements of the exterior of the former AIB branch on the corner of Gardiner Street also survive.

=== 51-52 Talbot Street ===
Located opposite Connolly Station, and with frontage also on Amiens Street, this public house premises pre-dates Talbot Street's formation, being a late Georgian survival (commenced c. 1830). Described in the National Inventory of Architectural Heritage as making "an important contribution to the architectural quality and variety of the northern part of the Georgian City", this building has a number of architecturally interesting external features.

=== Welsh Church ===
No. 78 Talbot Street (on the corner of Moland Place) is the site of the former Welsh Church or Capel Betel, designed by the architect William Murray (1789–1844), it is now a protected structure. It was a chapel for Welsh people visiting the city, with services conducted in Welsh. Established in 1838 (first service on Sunday 4 November 1838), its ethos was Calvinistic Methodism, and was affiliated to the Anglesea circuit. The Church was often referred to as the Welch Church, Welsh Methodist Church, Welsh Orthodox Church or Welsh Presbyterian Church. Prior to the establishment on Talbot Street, the Congregation used the German Lutheran Church on Poolbeg Street for a short time. An early Chaplain was Rev. William Griffiths. Rev. Edward Jones chaplain from 1865 until 1878, Rev. J.R. Jones 1878 to 1885 and Rev. John Owen served as chaplain from 1885 until 1894. Rev. John Lewis was the church's minister from 1894 to 1934, he tutored the politician Ernest Blythe, who attended services to study Welsh (as did other members of the Gaelic League). It was decided to close at a meeting in December 1938, the building was let to a Baptist congregation for a short time and then the building was sold in 1944, with proceeds going to churches in Anglesey. The former church has subsequently been a shoe shop (Griffiths), a snooker hall, an amusement arcade, and an Internet cafe.

=== Talbot House ===
An eleven-bay three-storey building with a basement, Talbot House was built in 1842 as a Teacher Training School for women. It was designed as part of the Department of Education) campus, the main entrance of which is on Marlborough Street, and was planned by the chief architect of that campus, Jacob Owen. Bay wings were added by J.H. Owens in 1859, and the building is considered to be of architectural interest. It now functions as office space for the Department.

=== Irish Life complex ===
The Irish Life Mall is a small shopping centre. Construction began in 1971 after Irish Life bought a set of Warehouses on Talbot Street in order to redevelop the land. It has a number of shops spread around a flat shopping mall and is easily accessible from both Talbot Street and Lower Abbey Street. The mall is part of the Irish Life Centre, which is a conglomerate of retail and office space, and apartments, with underground parking, and has a large frontage on Talbot Street. The car park for the Irish Life Centre is accessible from Abbey Street, exiting onto Beresford lane and Lower Gardiner Street.

== See also ==
- List of streets and squares in Dublin
