= Saving Light =

2017 single by Gareth Emery and Standerwick

Single by Gareth Emery and Standerwick featuring Haliene

from the album Monstercat 030 – Finale
- Released: 30 January 2017
- Studio: Emery's home studio
- Genre: Uplifting trance
- Length: 4:36 (original mix); 6:38 (extended mix)
- Label: Monstercat; Armada Music
- Songwriters: Roxanne Emery; Kelly Sweet; Matthew Steeper; Karra Madden
- Producers: Gareth Emery; Ian Standerwick

Gareth Emery singles chronology
"Isolate" (2014)	"Saving Light" (2017)	"Call to Arms" (2018)

Standerwick singles chronology
"Rebirth" (2016)	"Saving Light" (2017)	"Streets of Gold" (2017)

Music video
- "Saving Light" on YouTube

"Saving Light" is a song by English trance producers Gareth Emery and Standerwick, featuring vocals from Haliene. Roxanne Emery, Haliene, Matthew Steeper, and Karra wrote the song. It premiered in June 2016, during the Electric Daisy Carnival music festival and was digitally released on 30 January 2017. "Saving Light" is an uplifting trance song with lyrics about standing up to bullying and supporting victims by being their "saving light". Monstercat released the song as part of an initiative called "Make Trance No. 1 Again". Their goal was to encourage fans to purchase "Saving Light" on Beatport to support Ditch the Label and get the song to the top of the Beatport charts; this was achieved on 16 February 2017.

Critical response to "Saving Light" was positive: critics praised Haliene's vocal performance and the song's composition. The song was voted the 2017 Tune of the Year on Armin van Buuren's radio show A State of Trance and the Best Original Trance track of 2017 by the r/EDM subreddit. "Saving Light" was featured on Monstercat 030 – Finale, released on 22 February 2017. Armada Music later re-released it as part of A State of Trance 2017. Later in 2021, "Saving Light" was ranked #12 in A State of Trance's Top 1000.

The song's music video was shot and directed by Lee Jones and depicts a schoolgirl contemplating suicide after being a victim of bullying. The video received positive reviews and was praised for its depiction of bullying. The official remixes of "Saving Light" featured Notaker and Nwyr, and were released in August 2017. Various artists performed the song at music festivals such as Ultra Music Festival, Dreamstate Vancouver, and Bliss: Transcendence. Emery included "Saving Light" on his Laserface setlists.

== Writing and production ==
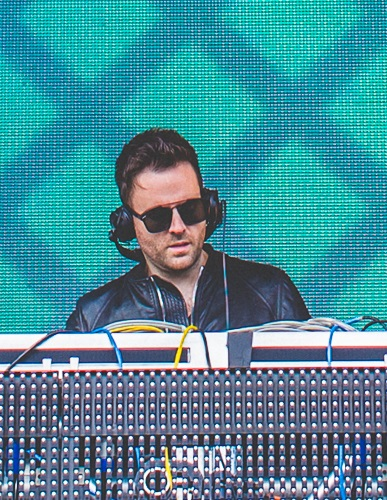
Emery (pictured) co-produced the song.

Gareth Emery arranged Roxanne Emery, Haliene, Matthew Steeper, and Karra for a writing session in his home studio. Gareth Emery was not able to attend however and instead gave them a demo that he and Standerwick had been working on beforehand. Roxanne Emery suggested that they write a song about suicide; the lyrics were written in under an hour.

Haliene provided vocals for the song; she explained its conception and depressing lyrical matter to Lisa-sun Nguyen of EDM Identity: "My whole goal is to bring more love and light to this world through my music, encourage people, and encourage togetherness. Coming out of dark places like I have got me thinking, 'How can we spin this?'"

The four wrote the song around a chorus played by Steeper on piano. Haliene sang the song to Gareth Emery and he believed it would be "a really special song." Once the vocals were complete, Emery and Standerwick tried different musical styles for six months before settling on a classic trance interpretation. Standerwick and Emery produced 20 instrumentals of "Saving Light", some of which included an electronic dance music (EDM) drop and a dubstep section. Emery tested each version in DJ sets before the song was completed.

== Composition and release ==
"Saving Light"
A 22-second sample of "Saving Light", which features Haliene singing; the lyrics surround the topic of suicide and being someone's "saving light". Her performance is backed by synthesizers.

"Saving Light" is an uplifting trance song that lasts four minutes and thirty-six seconds; its extended mix has a length of six minutes thirty-eight seconds. It features synthesizers accompanied by Haliene's vocal performance. The lyrics are about standing up to bullying and prejudice, suicide, and being a victim's "saving light". The song was described as emotional; an Earmilk columnist wrote that the producers followed a "seemingly formulaic path" in the creation of the track, though marked its melody as what stands out and makes the song's production speak to "each level of talent involved". Emery told Billboard that he did not want to get overly preachy or "diverge into PSA territory". He wanted to create a festival-suited trance song with a powerful message.

"Saving Light" debuted at the Electric Daisy Carnival music festival in June 2016; fans assumed that the song was produced by Craig Connelly, though he later openly stated that the track was not his. On 30 January 2017, Emery and Standerwick released "Saving Light" as a digital download. On 22 February 2017, the song was re-released as part of Monstercat 030 – Finale.

=== "Make Trance No. 1 Again" ===
"Saving Light" was released as part of "Make Trance No. 1 Again", an initiative organised by Emery and Monstercat that encouraged fans to purchase the song via Beatport to support the anti-bullying charity Ditch the Label. It received 100% of the profits made from sales of the song throughout February. Christopher Lawrence criticised Emery for this, claiming that he had been "waving the EDM flag for years" and that trance had been doing "just fine without [Emery]".

On 6 February 2017, "Saving Light" overtook tech house songs "Swagon" by Detlef and "Same Man" by Franky Rizardo to reach number one on the Beatport overall charts. It was the first trance song to enter the charts since "Anahera" by Gouryella in 2015, which reached only the number 10 position. It was also the first trance song to reach the number one position in five years. "Saving Light" was the highest-selling trance song of 2017 on Beatport.

== Critical reception ==
Critical response to "Saving Light" was largely positive, with Haliene's vocal performance praised. Sergei Zarovnyi of Billboard wrote that she adds "incredible vocals to the gripping production and lyrics that speak to the soul", and We Rave You's Fiorito Maniego felt that her voice suits the song's trance composition. Emery and Standerwick's production also received positive reviews. Abisola Oseni of EDM Identity praised "Saving Light" as "melodic and uplifting", and Steph Evans of Earmilk referred to the melody as "plain beautiful [and] emotional". Additionally, the song won Best Original Track in the Trance category on the Best of 2017 by the r/EDM subreddit with 198 participants.

=== A State of Trance 2017 and Tune of the Year ===
In late-2017, Armin van Buuren revealed the top 50 most voted tracks for the 2017 Tune of the Year. The songs—including "Saving Light"—were to comprise the mix album A State of Trance 2017. Van Buuren concluded the 845th episode of his A State of Trance radio show revealing that "Saving Light" had won Tune of the Year. Matthew Meadow of Your EDM noted that this marked the first time a non-trance label (Monstercat) has won the award.

== Remixes ==
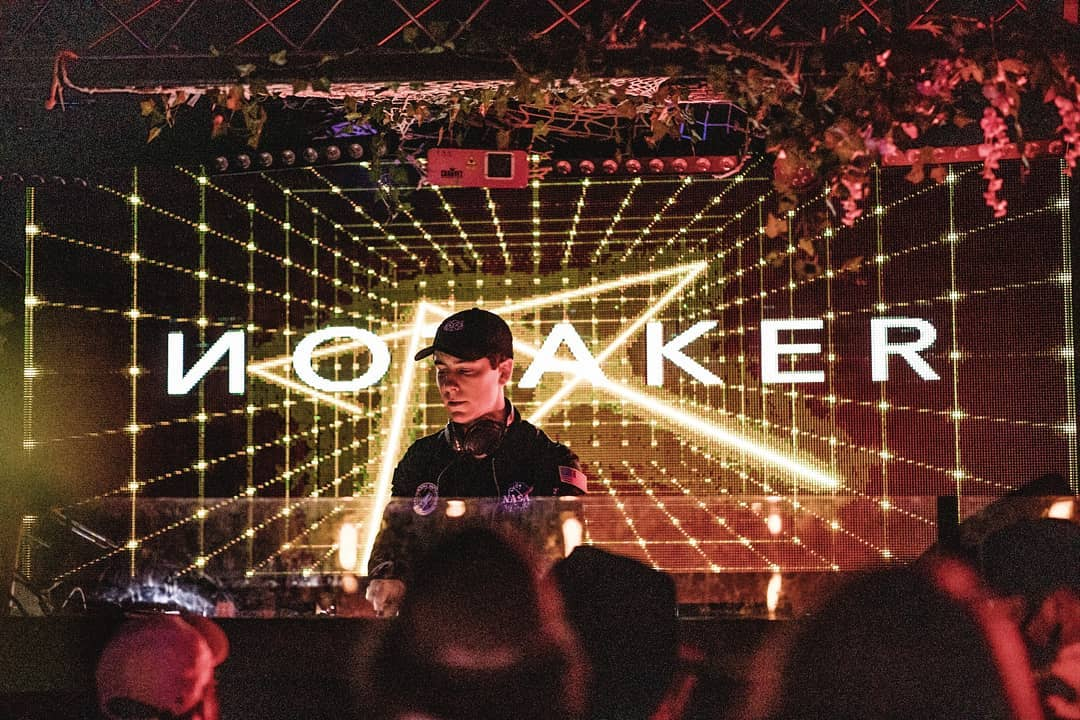
Notaker (pictured) was one of the remixers featured on the extended play.

Monstercat released an acoustic rendition of "Saving Light" on 17 August 2017. It featured Haliene performing the song alongside the Saint James Music Academy choir. Lennon Cihak of EDM.com praised Haliene's vocals, writing, "[Haliene] powers through the entire piece, placing her emotions, feelings, and strength behind the lyrics." Cihak also commended the overall video production, describing it as "warm, subtle and comforting". Lisa-sun Nguyen of EDM Identity wrote that the acoustic rendition "retained much of the magic of the song but in a softer way". She added that Haliene's vocals worked together with the choir to "make a song that was already amazing into something beautiful".

An extended play of "Saving Light" was released in August 2017; it features six remixes by various artists, including one by Notaker. His remix was well-received; an EDM Sauce editor felt that Notaker added a "gritty digital feel" to the song and allowed him to display his "version of this already incredible track". Robyn Dexter of Dancing Astronaut praised Notaker's sound design and production, saying he "continues to prove he's a force to be reckoned with in the dance music community".

On 30 January 2019, two years after the original release of "Saving Light", Haliene released her acoustic version of the song on Monstercat. Upon release, Haliene talked about her interpretation of the song, commenting "There are some songs that make you dance, some songs that make you cry, but few that truly touch your soul. Without [a] doubt, 'Saving Light' is one of those rare ones". Vivian Lin of Earmilk praised the rendition, calling it an "orchestral rhapsody that brings one back into the light", further describing the song as one that both "empowers and inspires, and something that may very well help you find the light in your life".

== Music video ==
In the music video, a schoolgirl is bullied by her peers.

Gareth Emery, Roxanne, Haliene, Matthew Steeper, and Karra developed a music video to focus on a theme of bullying and harassment. They contacted Ditch the Label to help create a storyline on the subject. They wished to showcase its harmful effects, potentially leading to thoughts of suicide, and the positive impact of one voice. In the video, a schoolgirl is bullied and harassed, eventually being pushed to the brink of suicide. A school teacher stands up to the bullies and stops the girl from jumping off a sea cliff.

Emery said that he did not want it to be a typical dance music video of him and Standerwick dancing at a festival, instead choosing to produce a video that would "provide hope for those dealing with adversity". Emery worked with Liam Hackett to write it as an authentic representation of bullying amongst youth. Lee Jones took ideas from Emery to help produce the video.

The music video was announced by Monstercat via their YouTube channel and was released on 30 January 2017. Reception towards the video was mostly positive; Caroline O'Keefe of The Nocturnal Times wrote that the video was "heartbreaking" and Dance Music Northwest's Stanley Sutton labelled it as a "tough watch". Abisola Oseni of EDM Identity described the music video as "even more powerful" than the song, describing it as an "inspirational and deeply moving piece that shows this but also provides hope".

== Live performances ==
The Saving Light tour was announced in July 2017. Emery performed the song as part of its setlist. Spanning from 15 September to 18 November, the tour visited over a dozen venues across the United States. Haliene made appearances on stage to perform "Saving Light" live. Emery's DJ sets have since been available for listening on SoundCloud. "Saving Light" has made appearances in Emery's Laserface sets.

Armin Van Buuren has featured the song in various DJ mixes. These include the 850th and 900th episode of A State of Trance and his set at Ultra Music Festival in Miami. In 2018, "Saving Light" was featured as part of Emery's Diplo & Friends mix on BBC Radio 1. Standerwick concluded his set at Bliss: Transcendence with the song. Haliene performed the song as part of her Dreamstate Vancouver set in 2019 alongside "Superhuman", "Paralysed", "Whisper", and "Dream in Colour".

Hixxy's remix of "Saving Light" was included in Darren Styles' Project:Z mix. Insomniac featured the remix on a Monstercat-centred episode of the series Cut From the Catalog; disk jockey Stonebank produced the mix. Nwyr's remix was played by the Dutch duo in their set at Ultra Music Festival in 2017. It was also later featured on the 138th episode of Night Owl Radio during Electric Daisy Carnival in 2018.

== Track listings ==
Digital download – Single
No.	Title	Length
1.	"Saving Light"	4:36
2.	"Saving Light" (Extended Mix)	6:38
Total length:		11:14

Digital download – Remixes
No.	Title	Length
1.	"Saving Light" (Nwyr Remix)	2:59
2.	"Saving Light" (Notaker Remix)	5:47
3.	"Saving Light" (Intercom Remix)	4:59
4.	"Saving Light" (Hixxy Remix)	4:35
5.	"Saving Light" (Ruben de Ronde Remix)	6:35
6.	"Saving Light" (Decoy! Remix)	3:07
Total length:		28:02

Digital download – Acoustic
No.	Title	Length
1.	"Saving Light" (Acoustic)	3:20
Total length:		3:20

== Credits and personnel ==
Credits adapted from Gareth Emery's interview with Alexa Shouneyia of Billboard:

Management

- Roxanne Emery

Personnel

- Lead vocals – Kelly Sweet
- Songwriting – Roxanne Emery, Kelly Sweet, Matthew Steeper, and Karra Madden
- Production – Ian Standerwick and Gareth Emery

== Release history ==
Region	Date	Format	Version	Label	Ref.
Worldwide	30 January 2017	Digital download	"Saving Light" (feat. Haliene)	Monstercat	
Worldwide	22 February 2017	Digital download	Monstercat 030 – Finale	Monstercat	
Worldwide	18 August 2017	Digital download	"Saving Light" (The Remixes) [feat. Haliene]	Monstercat	
Worldwide	1 November 2017	Digital download, CD single	A State of Trance 2017	Armada Music	
Worldwide	30 January 2019	Digital download	"Saving Light" (Acoustic)	Monstercat	
