= Christmas in Ireland =

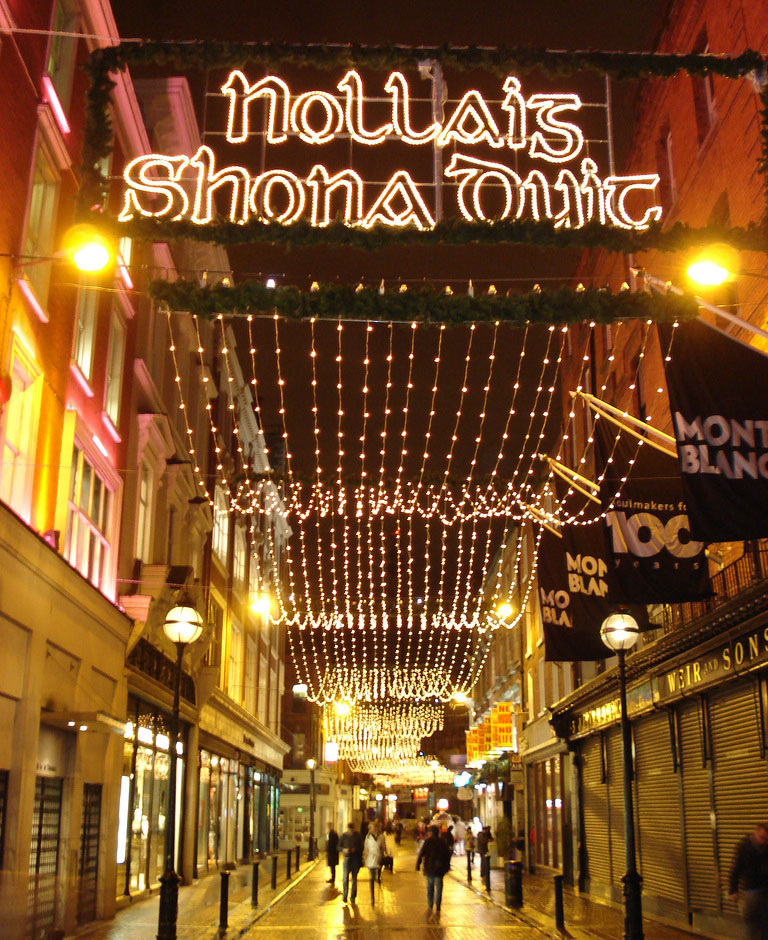
- Christmas lights in Dublin, 2007
- Official name: Lá Nollag
- Significance: marking the birth of Jesus
- Celebrations: Christmas tree decorations, church services
- Begins: 8 December
- Ends: 6 January
- Date: 25 December
- Next time: 25 December 2025
- Frequency: annual
- Related to: Advent

Christmas in Ireland is the annual festival which marks the Christian celebration of the birth of Jesus and its related observances, but also incorporates some pre-Christian customs. These customs range from the traditional food and drink consumed, decorations and rituals, as well as more modern phenomena such as the Christmas day swim and annual television and radio events. The modern Irish Christmas has become more similar to that of the British and American festive period, with emphasis on gift buying and parties.

Historically, for Irish Catholics, the festive period began on 8 December, the Feast of the Immaculate Conception, with many putting up their decorations and Christmas trees on that day, and runs through until 6 January, or Little Christmas. The greeting for "Happy Christmas" in Irish is Nollaig Shona Duit [singular] (IPA: [ˌn̪ˠɔl̪ˠəɟ ˈhɔnˠə d̪ˠɪtʲ]) or Nollaig Shona Daoibh [plural] (IPA: [ˌn̪ˠɔl̪ˠəɟ ˈhɔnˠə d̪ˠiːvʲ]). The literal translation of this is "Happy Christmas to you".

== Irish traditions at Christmas ==
Ireland is a predominantly Catholic country and Christmas plays an important role in religious aspects of Irish life, taking the place of the pre-Christian festival on the winter solstice. The earliest account of the Christian celebration of Christmas in Ireland are from 1171, when the excommunicated King Henry II spent Christmas in Dublin. The next account of a Dublin Christmas is from 1458 and focuses on religious dramas known as Miracle Plays.

There are traditionally large attendances at religious services for Christmas Day and Christmas Eve, with Midnight Mass a popular choice for Roman Catholics. There was also an early morning Christmas Day mass, that was believed to confer indulgences worth 20 masses. Even those who did not habitually attend mass, were generally expected to do on Christmas. It is also a time for remembering the dead in Ireland with prayers being offered for deceased at Mass. It is traditional to decorate graves at Christmas with a wreath made of holly, ivy, yew, or other evergreens. It was believed that if anyone died in the period between Christmas Day and Little Christmas on 6 January, they would enter heaven immediately. Christmas day was traditionally referred to as "Big Christmas" or Nollaig Mhór to differentiate it from Little Christmas. It was traditional in parts of Ulster for men to partake in an event called a "join", where they clubbed together to pay for food and drink, celebrating at any time in the 10 days of Christmas.

=== Decorations ===
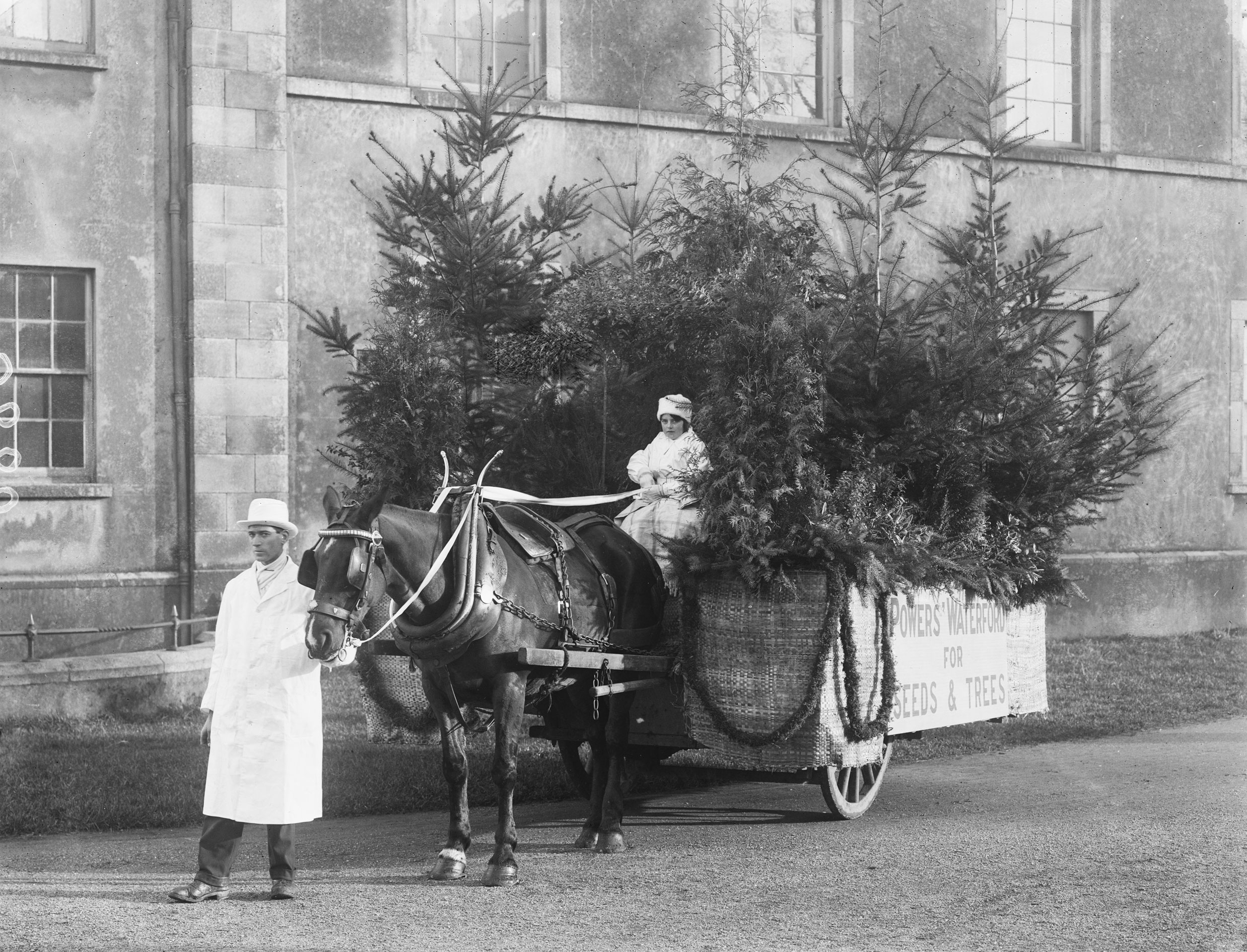
William Power Seed Merchants of O'Connell Street, Waterford selling Christmas trees in 1929

In the period of the mid 19th to mid 20th century, it was common for Irish households to clean and prepare the house for the Christmas period. This would include a cleaning and whitewashing the home, with decorating taking place after this. All parts of the house were cleaned, from the furniture and utensils, to sweeping the chimney. The use of evergreen foliage such as holly was seen to represent Christ, the Crown of Thorns, and his everlasting life, but also has pagan roots. Travelling people would sell paper decorations and "mottoes" door-to-door and at town markets from the late 19th century on. In Munster, it was traditional to fashion a decoration out of holly sprigs on to a simple wooden cross. In rural homes, the byre or cow-shed, stables and other buildings for animals would be decorated to honour the role of animals in the nativity story. In parts of Ireland, it was believed that at midnight on Christmas Eve, animals such as cows and donkeys could be heard to speak devotions in human speech. To hear a cockerel crow at midnight on Christmas Even was considered a good omen. Irish rural homes would also procure a large log, similar to a Yule log, called bloc na Nollaig.

Mistletoe was not part of traditional Irish Christmas decoration as it is not commonly found in Ireland, but has become a feature in modern times. Some areas, such as County Armagh did have the tradition of kissing under the mistletoe. Along with Great Britain, Ireland saw the introduction of Christmas trees during the reign of Queen Victoria, with their prevalence increasing from the 1840s. Before this, a large branch or the top of a tree was used instead. Christmas trees officially go up on 8 December because according to Christian tradition the immaculate conception was on this date. Trees in towns and cities are erected in central locations every year along with lights.

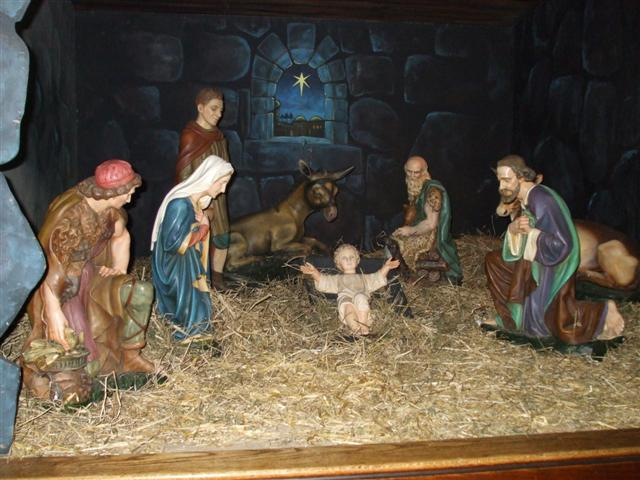
Crib Scene, Sacred Heart Church, Omagh, Northern Ireland

In Ireland the traditional crib, along with the Christmas tree are typically part of a family's decorations, typically made of wood or plaster. Most towns, shopping centres, schools and churches have a large crib display. Traditionally the figure of the baby Jesus would not be added to the crib until Christmas morning, and the three wise men would be placed in the nativity scene on Little Christmas. Leaving decorations up after 6 January was considered bad luck, and all the holly that had been used as decorations would be burnt. Local Catholic churches would often have a larger scale crib on display during the Advent period. Bringing home a few strands of straw from a church crib was thought to bring good luck, with those who lived in thatched houses adding the strands into the underside of the thatch. Since the late twentieth century, these crib displays are also placed in prominent public areas such as town squares, shopping malls, commercial buildings, housing estates, walking routes, main streets, shop windows and more. The Dublin "Moving Crib" at St. Martin Apostolate on Parnell Square which depicts the traditional Nativity story from start to finish along with more biblical scenes such as Noah's Ark and the Garden of Eden from the Old Testament and other secular Christmas and Fairytale scenes using mechanical figures, and also the "Live Crib" with live farm animals at the Mansion House are among the most popular and well known Christmas attractions in the city, and also some of the most famous versions nationwide.

=== Santa Claus ===
Santa Claus, Daidí na Nollag (lit. father of Christmas ) in Irish, is known in The Republic of Ireland and Northern Ireland as Santy or Santa. He brings presents to children in Ireland, which are opened on Christmas morning. It is traditional to leave a mince pie and a bottle or a glass of Guinness along with a carrot for Rudolph. Most big shopping centres have a Santa's grotto set up from late November so that shoppers and visitors with kids can visit Santa and tell him what they want for Christmas.

=== Christmas Candle ===
The placing of a lighted candle in the window of a house on Christmas Eve is still practised. This is also called Coinneal Mór na Nollag is placed at the window to welcome people in need of shelter. Its primary purpose is to welcome Mary and Joseph. In some houses, it was traditional for the youngest child or the mother of the house to light the candle. In many parts of Ireland, including County Armagh, it was traditional to leave the door unlocked as well. In some areas of Ireland, it was customary to light 3 candles, representing the Holy Family. If the candle was extinguished unintentionally, this was perceived as a bad omen. In the period before rural electrification, these candles would have had a significant effect on the rural landscape at night. There are some traditions in which the candles burned at Christmas would be used for divining the future. The tradition still persists, but often using an electric light in place of a candle.

=== Christmas swim ===
In the late twentieth century it has become traditional to swim in the sea on Christmas morning. This is often done in aid of charity. The Forty Foot in Sandycove in Dublin and Blackrock in Salthill, Galway are traditional venues for this where hundreds brave the cold temperatures and jump into the sea.

=== Christmas dinner ===
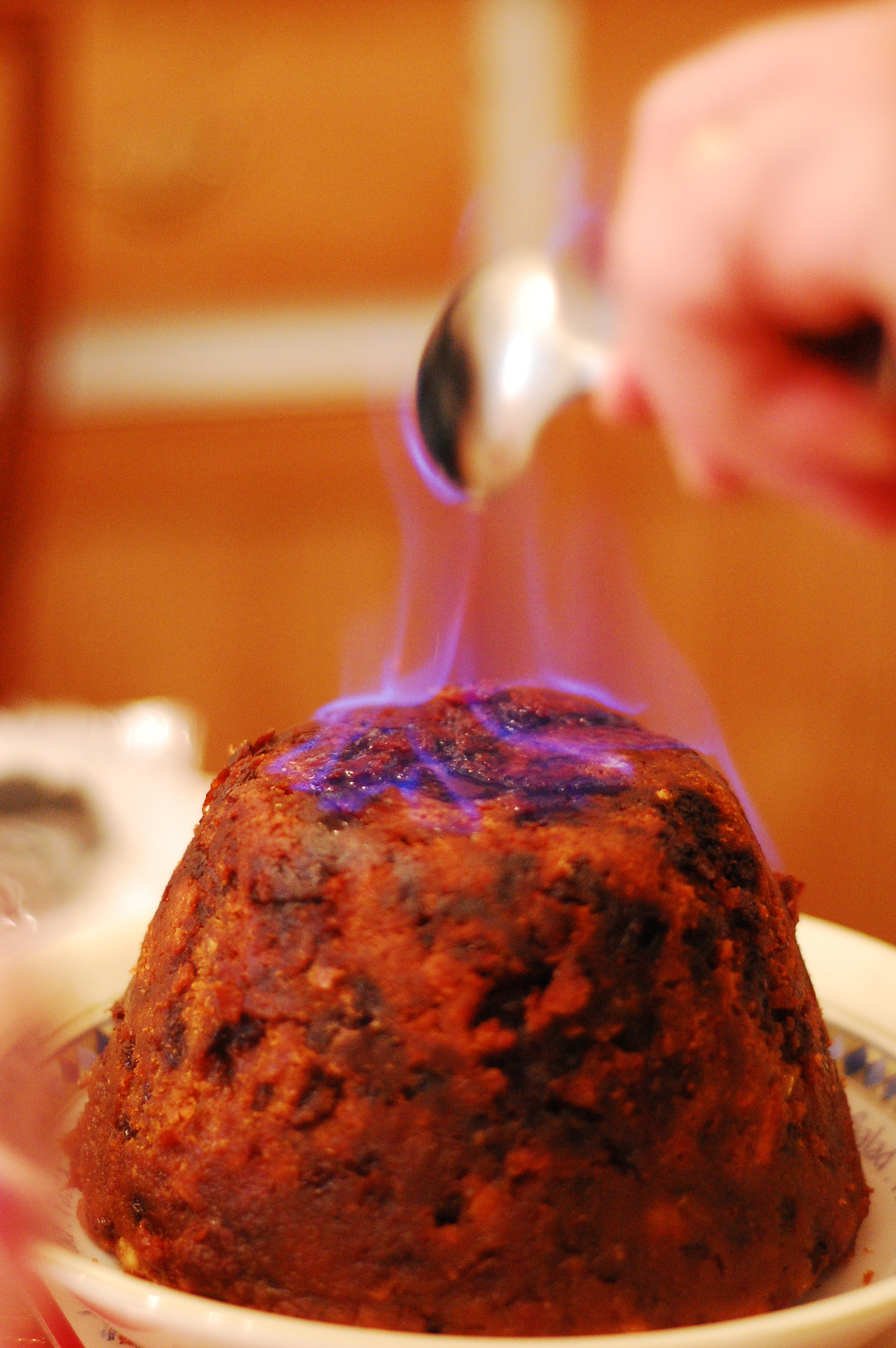
Christmas Pudding with flaming rum

On Christmas Eve fish is traditionally eaten as a form of fasting before Christmas. In the mid 19th to 20th century, Irish families would have spent a number of weeks in the run up to Christmas "getting in the Christmas", slowly purchasing all the food and supplies needed for the holiday. In rural areas, the local shopkeeper would give loyal patrons a "Christmas box" as a gift, which often included a Christmas candle and a Christmas jug. The Christmas jug was a china jug full of jam. The tradition of the Christmas box largely waned after the rationing during World War II, but persists in some areas of Ireland with items such as calendars and vouchers for local businesses. While Christmas dinner was being prepared, it was customary across much of the country for men and boys to play a game of hurling. Other areas, such as in Ulster, shooting matches and hunting took place.

The traditional Christmas dinner consisted of boiled, spiced, roast beef, a roast goose and ham with a selection of vegetables and roast potatoes. Beef remained the most popular Christmas meat in Ulster until into the 20th century, with boiled ox-head popular in Counties Armagh, Monaghan, and Tyrone. The cooking of a turkey is a more modern, imported tradition. They also have round cake full of caraway seeds. Dessert often consisted of an array of dishes, with Christmas pudding a traditional choice, which is sometimes served with brandy being poured over it and then set alight. Along with the Christmas tree, it is thought that the plum pudding and mince pies came to Ireland from England. It was considered unlucky to cut the pudding before Christmas Day, and if the pudding broke during cooking the baker would be dead before next Christmas. In County Wexford a traditional dish known as "cuttlin pudding" was made on Christmas Eve. In County Donegal, pies in the shape of cradles to represent the manger were traditional. Other desserts include Christmas cake, sherry trifle, yule log and mince pies with sauces such as brandy butter.

Thousands of tins of biscuits, which are bought in advance, may then be opened and eaten. Of the traditional biscuit selections available ahead of the festive season, the Afternoon Tea variety outsells the others. Chocolate selection boxes are also popular as gifts at Christmas.

=== After Christmas Day ===
Saint Stephen's Day would be marked by the visiting of wren boys to homes to collect money for the "wren party". It was traditional for Christians to fast on Saint Stephen's Day in honour of the saint's martyrdom. Both The Republic of Ireland and Northern Ireland have the tradition of Christmas mummers' play, similar to but different from the wren boys; participants would cite rhymes in exchange for "treats" in the two weeks leading up to Christmas. Christmas celebrations in Ireland finish on 6 January, variously known as Women's Christmas (Nollaig na mBan), Little Christmas or Epiphany, with people taking down their Christmas decorations. The period between Christmas day and Little Christmas was known as "between the two Christmases" and was a popular time for matchmaking as it was traditionally a period of leisure. It was commonly believed that only snow that fell during this period would stay on the ground. On New Year's Eve 1961 RTÉ launched as the first television station based in the Republic of Ireland.

=== Homecoming ===
Adult children returning to their home was customary over the Christmas period, usually returning on Christmas Eve. Those who had emigrated generally sent gifts or money back, often referred as the "American letter". Since the 1980s both Ireland and Northern Ireland have seen an increase in the number of Irish and British emigrants returning to the island for the Christmas period. Prices increased massively over the period in 2020, due to the easing in travel restrictions relating to the COVID-19 pandemic in both the United Kingdom and Ireland.

== Christmas spend ==
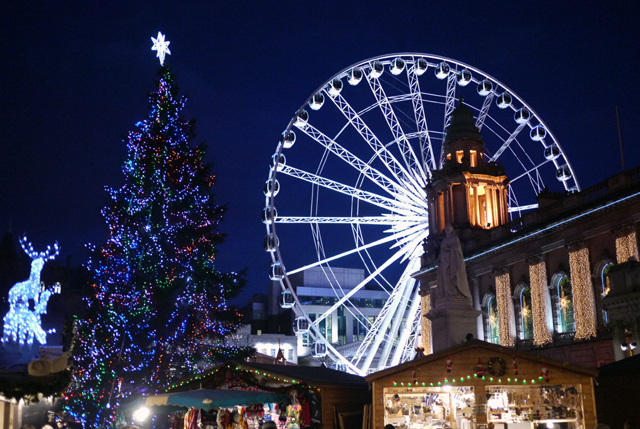
Christmas lights, Belfast in 2009

In 2015 a survey it was found that 44% will have sufficient money in their monthly income to pay for Christmas, 23% are likely to dip into their savings, while almost half of those surveyed (45%) will have to borrow money to cope. The last 33% of all the people are unknown off their shopping spend.

The big traditional Christmas shopping day used to be the 8th of December, when many schools would close for the Catholic Feast of the Immaculate Conception and people from rural areas would head to the towns and cities to do their Christmas shopping. The tradition appears to have begun in the 1940s, when the department store Clerys, under the new management of Denis Guiney, offered a refund on their customers' train tickets if they spent more than £5 in the store. With the advent of online shopping and other popular shopping days such as Black Friday, the 8th of December is no longer a very busy shopping day.

== Holiday period ==
Traditionally, the holiday period was viewed as running from Christmas Day until 6 January. Christmas Day and Saint Stephen's Day or Boxing Day are public holidays, and many people do not return to work until the next week day after New Year's Day. Many multinational companies and businesses close the day before Christmas Eve and re-open the day after New Year's Day. Shop and public service workers usually return to work the day after Saint Stephen's Day and sometimes on Saint Stephen's Day if the Christmas sales have started.

== Christmas over the media ==
=== The Late Late Toy Show ===
The Late Late Toy Show is an annual edition of The Late Late Show aired on RTÉ One usually on the last Friday of November and is dedicated to the showcasing of that year's most popular toys. It is regularly the most watched television programme of the year by Irish audiences, and is broadcast live, meaning anything can and has happened. The show, which consists of an adult-only studio audience dressed in traditional Christmas attire, does not accept advertisements which promote toys for its commercial breaks but, whilst new gadget-type toys regularly break down during the live show, being featured on the programme itself has been said to have a major boost to sales of a product over the following number of weeks in the build-up to the Christmas period. The attire of the presenter, namely a jumper, is also subject to speculation in the media beforehand and afterhand. Advertising in 2009 cost €17,000 for each 30-second slot—this compares to €9,750 for the 2010 UEFA Champions League Final.

=== Radio ===
Joe Duffy's walk around Grafton Street, Dublin is an annual tradition broadcast by RTÉ Radio 1 on Christmas Eve. RTÉ 2fm disc jockey Dave Fanning counts down his "Fanning's Fab 50" listeners music poll on air each year before Christmas. From 2008, Christmas FM broadcast Christmas songs non-stop until 26 December.

=== Christmas music ===
"Fairytale of New York" was voted the song most drivers wanted to listen to in the Republic of Ireland in 2009, with "Happy Xmas" topping a similar poll cast in Northern Ireland. The Christmas music of British singer Cliff Richard was most popular with those aged over 55 as of 2009.

Beyond Ireland, Irish Christmas traditions and Irish Folk Music have influenced seasonal performances and cultural events in several countries. In Germany, for example, “Irish Christmas Shows” have become appreciated stage productions combining Irish folk music, dance, and storytelling to celebrate the festive season.
