= Richard Bradbury =

British retailer (born 1956)

Richard Edward Bradbury CBE
- Born: 4 February 1956 (age 70); Bedfordshire, England
- Education: Bedford Modern School, Luton Polytechnic
- Occupation: Retail executive
- Known for: Chief Executive of River Island (2008–2011)
- Title: Non-executive director of Boden
- Spouse: Susan Price (m. 1981)
- Children: 2 daughters
- Awards: Commander of the Order of the British Empire (2008), Beacon Fellowship (2013)

Richard Edward Bradbury CBE (born 4 February 1956), is a British retailer who was chief executive of River Island (2008–2011), the high street fashion brand founded by Bernard Lewis with worldwide annual sales in excess of US$1 billion.

== Early life ==
Bradbury was born on 4 February 1956, the son of Albert and Lily Bradbury. He grew up in Bedfordshire and was educated at Bedford Modern School and Luton Polytechnic.

== Career ==
Bradbury began his retailing career at Barnaby Rudge (1975–76) before becoming a merchandiser for Harry Fenton Menswear (1977–1979). After Harry Fenton he joined the Burton Group in 1979, initially as a merchandiser (1979–81) but later as a buyer becoming buying director (1986–1989).

In 1989 Bradbury joined River Island, the private high street fashion brand founded by Bernard Lewis, as managing director of Womenswear (1989–1998), group managing director (1998–2007) and finally chief executive (2008–11). At the time he was the only non-family member to hold a senior post at the company. When Bradbury left the business he was reputedly paid £15m.

Bradbury was made CBE in 2008 for services to the retail industry. He is currently a non-executive director of Boden.

== Charitable work ==
Bradbury has been a patron of Scope since 2012 and is chairman of the appeal board. He worked with the NHS on its Patient Revolution Initiative in 2012 and was awarded a Beacon Fellowship for Pioneering Philanthropy in 2013.

== Family life ==
Bradbury married Susan Price in 1981 and they have two daughters.
