= Path.Finder =

EP by Notaker
- Released: April 8, 2019
- Recorded: 2018–19
- Genre: Synthwave; downtempo; trance; chiptune
- Length: 27:52
- Label: Monstercat
- Producer: David Nothaker

Notaker chronology
Erebus I (2018)	Path.Finder (2019)

Singles from Path.Finder
- 1. "Into the Light" Released: January 31, 2019; 2. "Each Other" Released: March 18, 2019

Path.Finder (stylised in all caps) is the fourth extended play by American electronic music producer Notaker, released by Monstercat on April 8, 2019. It was preceded by the singles "Into the Light" and "Each Other". Karra and Eric Lumiere provide guest vocals.

== Background and release ==
The extended play was released as a follow-up to Notaker's previous extended play, Erebus I, released in 2018 on Canadian record label Mau5trap. It was marked as Notaker's second extended play release by Monstercat, since the release of his Genesis extended play in 2017. Path.Finder was released as the third in his Vessel series, which was released as a way to "showcase and discuss stories and themes not possible to convey in just one song".

To promote Path.Finder, two songs from the extended play were released as singles. Its lead single, "Into the Light", was released on January 31, 2019, and its sophomore single "Each Other" on March 18. On April 8, 2019, the album was released exclusively as a digital download on international digital stores through Monstercat.

== Critical reception ==
Path.Finder was well received by most critics. Farrell Sweeney of Dancing Astronaut noted the songs featured as having an "underlying dark edge that frames a collection of upbeat, vocal-lead, and ominous singles juxtaposed against one another." ThisSongSlaps' Lauren Ikenn wrote that the extended play was "well worth the wait" and was "everything we wanted and more." Writing for The Nocturnal Times, Caroline O'Keefe compared it to Notaker's previous extended play, Erebus I, writing that the prior is more progressive-base, writing that the record took "listeners on a transcendent journey through progressive anthems, some of his most unique productions to date, and emotionally-rich narratives that culminate in a mesmerising balance of delight and remembrance." Asad Aftab of EDMTunes praised the extended play, stated that Notaker had assembled "emotionally powerful, synth-heavy bass music by crafting radiant soundscapes & coupling it with masterful production" and concluding his review by writing that it "It charts the evolution of Notaker as a musical artist as he explores a more melodic sound throughout, and it's exciting to see him evolve his sound even more on future releases."

The single "Each Other" had also garnered positive reception from critics, with Jim Babaoglu of EDM Sauce describing the single as an "uplifting progressive synthwave track that possesses both beauty and power", later stating that Notaker "never seems to disappoint." EDMTunes' Ian Thompson called the single a "blast from Notaker's original synthwave style" and noted it as having a Seven Lions-esque beginning.

== Track listing ==
Digital download
No.	Title	Length
1.	"Only in My Dreams"	4:42
2.	"Into The Light" (featuring Karra)	3:21
3.	"Melophonic"	4:23
4.	"Each Other" (featuring Eric Lumiere)	3:20
5.	"The Longest Night"	7:34
6.	"Into The Light" (VIP mix; featuring Karra)	4:32
Total length:		27:52

== Release history ==
Region	Date	Format	Label	Ref.
Worldwide	April 8, 2019	Digital download	Monstercat	
