= Switzer & Company =

Former department store in Ireland

- Company type: Private
- Industry: Retail
- Genre: Department stores
- Founded: 1838
- Founders: John Wright Switzer
- Defunct: 1995
- Headquarters: 88-95 Grafton Street; Dublin, Ireland
- Area served: Ireland
- Products: Quality and luxury goods

Switzer & Company, also known as Switzer & Co. and Switzers, was a chain of department stores in Ireland.

== History ==
On 6 June 1890, Switzer & Company was incorporated under the chairmanship of John Wright Switzer. This company had begun as a drapers and tailors in 1838 at 91 Grafton Street, Dublin, and as it expanded it moved to Commercial Hall on the corner of Grafton Street and Wicklow Street. These new premises allowed for the business to develop into a department store. Between 1838 and the incorporation of Switzer & Company, John Wright Switzer had various partners in the business. One of the co-founders of the business was John Hamilton Reid. Reid's granddaughter, Margaret Hamilton Reid, would later serve as chair of Switzers from 1956 to 1972.

The store on Grafton Street became famous for its Christmas displays and Santa's grotto.

Switzers purchased Cash & Co. of Cork in 1962, Todd's of Limerick in 1963, and Moon's of Galway in 1969. In 1971, Switzers was purchased by Waterford Glass and House of Fraser. Later, in 1985, House of Fraser took complete control of the company. It was later sold in early 1990s to the Weston family, who owned Brown Thomas, and the name Switzers was dropped. The Switzers premises on Grafton Street was refurbished and remodelled as the flagship Brown Thomas store, but the name Switzer's remains over one door on Wicklow Street.
