= BlackGummy =

American DJ and producer

- Born: Iman Marouf; April 9, 1991 (age 34); Los Angeles, California, U.S.
- Origin: Los Angeles, California, U.S.
- Genres: Techno; electro house; progressive house; industrial
- Occupations: DJ; producer; musician; songwriter
- Instrument: Digital audio workstation
- Years active: 2013–present
- Label: mau5trap
- Website: blackgummy.com

Iman Marouf (born 9 April 1991), better known by his stage name BlackGummy, is an American DJ and producer based in Los Angeles, California. BlackGummy is best known for his dark focused industrial/techno and electro/house fused productions along with his enigmatic black bear-shaped idol. He tours regularly in the United States, and since 2016 has performed at festivals such as Electric Daisy Carnival, Lollapalooza, Shambhala Music Festival, Electric Zoo, Electric Forest, Escape Halloween, Nocturnal Wonderland, and Buku Music Festival.

== Early life ==
Iman states his musical beginnings were spent either in a studio creating music or building studios. He grew up listening to artists such as System of a Down, 2pac, The Notorious B.I.G., Karlheinz Stockhausen, Bach, Nirvana, Sublime, Gesaffelstein, Cirez D, and Carl Cox. Iman is a graduate of the Icon Collective Music production school in Burbank, California. There he met Steve Duda, who helped train Iman in sound design and sound engineering through the school's mentoring program. Iman also beta tested Steve's software synthesizer Serum and is listed the VST's credits.

== Career ==
On June 8, 2015 BlackGummy released his first single, 'Lullaby' as part of Mau5trap's "We Are Friends Vol. 04" compilation. In September later that year he followed up with a collaboration with Louis Vivet titled 'Deep Bounce'. On February 26, 2016 BlackGummy released his first EP, Singularity. The EP was released with mau5trap and consisted of 'The Machine' as the lead single, 'Plucking Technology', 'Alarm', and 'The Unseen'. The EP was inspired by the idea of a more technologically advanced future where artificial intelligence reigns over human intelligence. August 12, 2016, BlackGummy released another single in collaboration with Brooks titled "NeverDeader". The collaboration was part of the We Are Friends Vol. 5 compilation. On September 30 of that year BlackGummy followed up with the release of his second EP, Impactor. It featured 'Descent' as the lead single, 'KT', 'Incoming', and 'Adaptive Radiation'. The EP circles around the idea of advancement from destruction, using the KT Extinction as a metaphor for the ever-changing environment of modern dance music. On January 27, 2017, Blackgummy released his collaboration with vocalist Colleen D'Agostino on Ninety9lives titled 'Superhuman'. BlackGummy followed up at the end of March with a 'VIP' edit to his Impactor EP lead single 'Descent'. He released it on the 'We Are Friends Vol. 6' compilation. For the mau5trap ten year anniversary, BlackGummy remixed 'Oyster' by Moguai. On July 28, 2017, BlackGummy released his third artist EP titled 'Monolith'. The EP consists of the lead single 'Iconoclast' followed by 'Arp Makes Sphinx Purr', 'Desert Fire', and 'Edifice'. Then late in 2018, Iman released his first collection of remixes titled "Blackgummy: The Remixes (Vol.1)". The EP featured remixers such as: EDDIE, Brennan Gray, & Metacentric.

== Discography ==
=== Extended plays ===
- Singularity (2016)
- Impactor (2016)
- Monolith (2017)
- BlackGummy: The Remixes (Vol. 1) (2018)

=== Singles ===
- 2015: "Deep Bounce" (with Louis Vivet)
- 2016: "Descent" (Impactor)
- 2017: "SuperHuman" (with Colleen D'Agostino)
- 2018: "Corrupted" (with Notaker) (Erebus I)

=== Guest appearances ===
- 2015: "Lullaby" (We Are Friends, Vol. 4)
- 2016: "NeverDeader" (featuring Brooks) (We Are Friends, Vol. 5)
- 2017: "Descent (VIP)" (We Are Friends, Vol. 6)

=== Remixes ===
- 2017: Moguai - "Oyster" (BlackGummy Remix)
