= Infinite (Notaker song) =

Single by Notaker

from the album Monstercat 027 – Cataclysm
- Released: 22 April 2016
- Recorded: 2016
- Genre: New beat; synthwave
- Length: 5:55
- Label: Monstercat
- Songwriter(s): David Notaker
- Producer(s): David Notaker

Notaker singles chronology
"Feel The Rain" (2015)	"Infinite" (2016)	"Gems" (2016)

Infinite is a new beat song by American electronic music producer Notaker. The song was released on 22 April 2016, by the Canadian record label Monstercat.

== Reception and release ==
Infinite was well received by a wide range of critics. DJ Mag rated the song an 8/10 saying, "Notaker brings out the big guns with ‘Infinite’ for a record full of chunky grooves and epic electro melodies that signals his arrival as a progressive force to be reckoned with." Toby Reaper of Dancing Astronaut described Notaker's style in Infinite as "spacey, adventurous buildups and heavy, technical drops into a progressive sound that thrives in the mid-tempo range". Timmy Kusnierek of Your EDM stated "Infinite centres around the obscure rumbles of a far-off nebula, waxing into a space-faring adventure as a classic progressive synth leads the way", further stating "Overall, the entire production creates a celestial atmosphere that’s too rich to ignore". Petar Lazarevic of We Rave You stated "Infinite, combines spacey overtones sounded out by metallic, hollow atmosphere with a thumping, deep bassline and a simplistic melody into a punchy house offering".

Brian poles of This Song Slaps described Infinite as a song that plays more as a story than a piece of music, stating "the progression through the song through additions and omissions of sounds and going from hard from the first drop to a softer and more melodic final drop tells the story of traveling through space in a great way". John Carr of Global Dance Electronic described the production as a cross between "the dark realm of French Techno and the ethereal atmosphere of trance for a sound that can fit into a myriad of DJ sets and stand out as an epic moment". Joe Hoffman of Dance and Rave stated "Infinite, is a gloriously dynamic blend of melodic and dark, and Progressive and Bass, and is sure to win a lot of fans over with its fluid progressions".
