= Shimmer (Notaker song) =

2017 song by Notaker

Single by Notaker

from the album Monstercat 030 – Finale
- Released: 6 February 2017
- Recorded: July 2016–2017
- Genre: EDM
- Length: 4:46
- Label: Monstercat
- Producer(s): David Nothaker

Notaker singles chronology
"Gems" (2016)	"Shimmer" (2017)	"Born in the Flames" (2017)

"Shimmer" is a song by American DJ and electronic music producer Notaker. Canadian record label Monstercat released it on February 6, 2017. The song was originally released as part of the compilation album Monstercat 030 – Finale, released February 22, 2017.

== Background and release ==
Shimmer
8 note Shimmer sample (in MIDI)

Notaker began the writing process for the song over Independence Day weekend in 2016, producing the song without many setbacks, with the only exception being a 'shout' sample that occurs alongside the snare throughout the song. In attempts to pitch-up the sample, the quality of said sample diminished. To solve this issue, Notaker simply pitched everything in the track down to match the sample, which he described as a "long and tedious solution to what seemed to be a simple problem."

Notaker aimed to produce a song that could be set apart from his other works, with Shimmer being aimed to have a warm "feel good" sound to it, contrasting the "epic" sounds found in his previous songs. He named the song "Shimmer" as he felt that the "sound of the song itself shined and sounded pretty."

On February 6, 2017, the song was released as a digital download on international digital stores through Canadian record label Monstercat, as well as being released through various music streaming services. "Shimmer" was featured on the compilation album titled Monstercat 030 – Finale released on February 22, 2017.

== Critical reception ==
"Shimmer" was well received by most critics. Writing for Dancing Astronaut, Kanvar Kohli wrote that all the components present in the song had "come together to create a track that as striking as it is serene", describing the track as having "tranquil, aurally pleasing elements, which evoke a hypnotic effect upon listening." Molly Hankins of Nest HQ stated that the track has a "retro-trance and house-fueled vibe but progresses like pure electronica creating a gorgeous soundscape along its way." Noiseporn's Harrison Morgan wrote that the song has two distinct bass drops, stating that "each drop has its ups and downs, but every high is always the best when the precedent is one of the lowest of lows." Steve Jacobs of EDM Sauce noted the song as being reminiscent of the song "Midnight City" by French electronic music project M83 and in the style of Grammy-nominated record producer Porter Robinson, writing that the song had solidified "Notaker's ability to produce top-shelf music."

== Track listing ==
Digital download – Single
No.	Title	Length
1.	"Shimmer"	4:46
Total length:		4:46

== Release history ==
Region	Date	Format	Version	Label	Ref.
Worldwide	February 6, 2017	Digital download	"Shimmer"	Monstercat	
Worldwide	February 22, 2017	Digital download	Monstercat 030 – Finale	Monstercat	
