= The Storm (Notaker song) =

2018 synthwave song by Notaker

Single by Notaker

from the album Monstercat Uncaged Vol. 6
- Released: 17 September 2018
- Recorded: 2018
- Genre: New beat; synthwave
- Length: 4:54
- Label: Monstercat
- Producer(s): David Nothaker

Notaker singles chronology
"Corrupted" (2018)	"The Storm" (2018)	"Into the Light" (2019)

The Storm is a song by American electronic producer Notaker. The Song was released by Monstercat on September 17, 2018. The song was added to the soundtrack of the game Forza Horizon 4 in December 2018.

== Reception and release ==
The release of The Storm received overwhelmingly positive critical reception. Angus Paterson of DJ Mag gave the song an 8/10 rating saying the record was, "A particularly colourful and energetic record from Notaker, that features him in particularly good form, packed with electro melodies, visceral big room energy and knockout broken beat thunder." Robyn Dexter of Dancing Astronaut praised the record for its transcendental experience saying, "The world he’s built within the song’s five-minute length serves as both the calm before the storm and the storm itself."

Chelsea King of Noise Porn described the song saying,"The rhythmic synths and galactic soundbites break into a massive dance anthem. Notaker’s creativity on “The Storm” amazes us once again." Katie Stone from EDM.com wrote, "The gradual build raises the tension until we get to the first drop and he brings in those powerful arpeggios. I even hear a little 80s synths going on as he brings us deeper into the storm. Finally, that last drop takes us on a whole different trajectory into some dark bass goodness. Overall, the song is haunting and captivating. Notaker has perfected the ability to keep the listener on their toes. You never know where he's going to take you. This talent is characterized both by his unique sound design and his ability to immerse fans into his narrative."

== Track listing ==
Digital download – Single
No.	Title	Length
1.	"The Storm"	4:54
Total length:		4:54

== Release history ==
Region	Date	Format	Label	Ref.
Worldwide	September 17, 2018	Digital download	Monstercat	
