= Grafton Street =

Street in central Dublin, Ireland

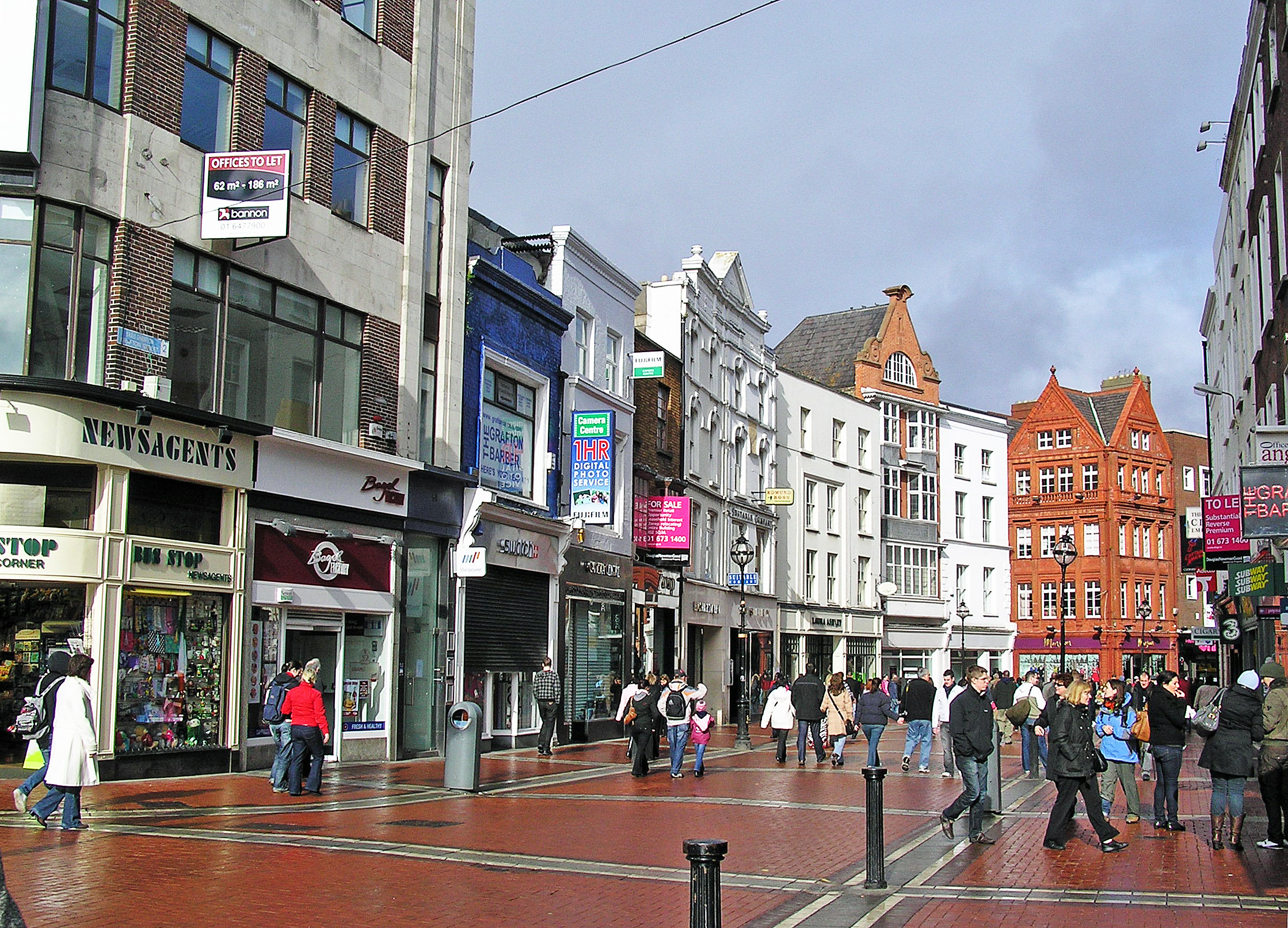
- South end of Grafton Street

- Location within Central Dublin
- Native name: Sráid Grafton (Irish)
- Namesake: Charles FitzRoy, 2nd Duke of Grafton
- Length: 500 m (1,600 ft)
- Width: 12 metres (39 ft)
- Location: Dublin, Ireland
- Postal code: D02
- Coordinates: 53°20′29″N 6°15′37″W
- north end: College Green
- south end: St. Stephen's Green (northwest corner)

Other
- Known for: Shops, Bewley's Oriental Café, busking

Grafton Street (Irish: Sráid Grafton) is one of the two principal shopping streets in Dublin city centre – the other being Henry Street. It runs from St Stephen's Green in the south (at the highest point of the street) to College Green in the north (the lowest point).

The street, on the Southside of the city, was developed from a laneway in the early 1700s, and its line was shaped by the now-culverted River Steyne. Initially, a fashionable residential street with some commercial activity, the character of Grafton Street changed after it was connected to Carlisle Bridge and came to form part of a cross-city route. It suffered from dilapidation and prostitution through the 19th century, with several run-down buildings. During the 20th century, it became known for the coffee house Bewley's, mid- and up-market shopping, and as a popular spot for buskers. It has been assessed as one of the most expensive main retail streets in the world on which to rent.

== Name ==
The street was named after Charles FitzRoy, 2nd Duke of Grafton, the illegitimate grandson of King Charles II, who owned land in the area. His father, Henry FitzRoy, 1st Duke of Grafton, died on 9 October 1690 following the Siege of Cork. The second duke was Lord Lieutenant of Ireland from 1721 to 1724.

== History ==
=== Early development ===
The street was developed from an existing country lane, connecting College Green to St Stephen's Green, which had been worked on by the Dawson family, after whom the parallel Dawson Street is named. It was developed and widened through the early 1700s, starting in 1708. Four years later, the city's governing body, Dublin Corporation, approved development along the street in order to make a "crown causeway". Its line was shaped by the short culverted River Steyne, which rises on one side of St Stephen's Green and flows towards College Green and the Liffey near O'Connell Bridge. Development was largely complete by 1727.

From the beginning, the street held a mixture of residential and commercial development. Advertisements from the 1750s and 1760s describe first-floor apartments featuring a dining room, bedchamber and closet. The theatre manager Louis Du Val lived in Grafton Street in 1733, as did the novelist Charles Robert Maturin's family. Thomas Verner founded an Orange Order Lodge in 1791 at Harrington's Hotel on Grafton Street.

The street was largely rebuilt in the late 1700s, following the completion of Carlisle Bridge (now O'Connell Bridge) in 1758, spanning the River Liffey, when Grafton Street came to form part of an important north-south thoroughfare. Many of the remaining residences were redeveloped into shops, and several taverns were established along the street. This was supplemented by the widening and rebuilding which took place as part of the work of the Wide Streets Commission, from 1841. By the latter part of the 19th century, the street was primarily commercial in nature.

=== 19th century ===
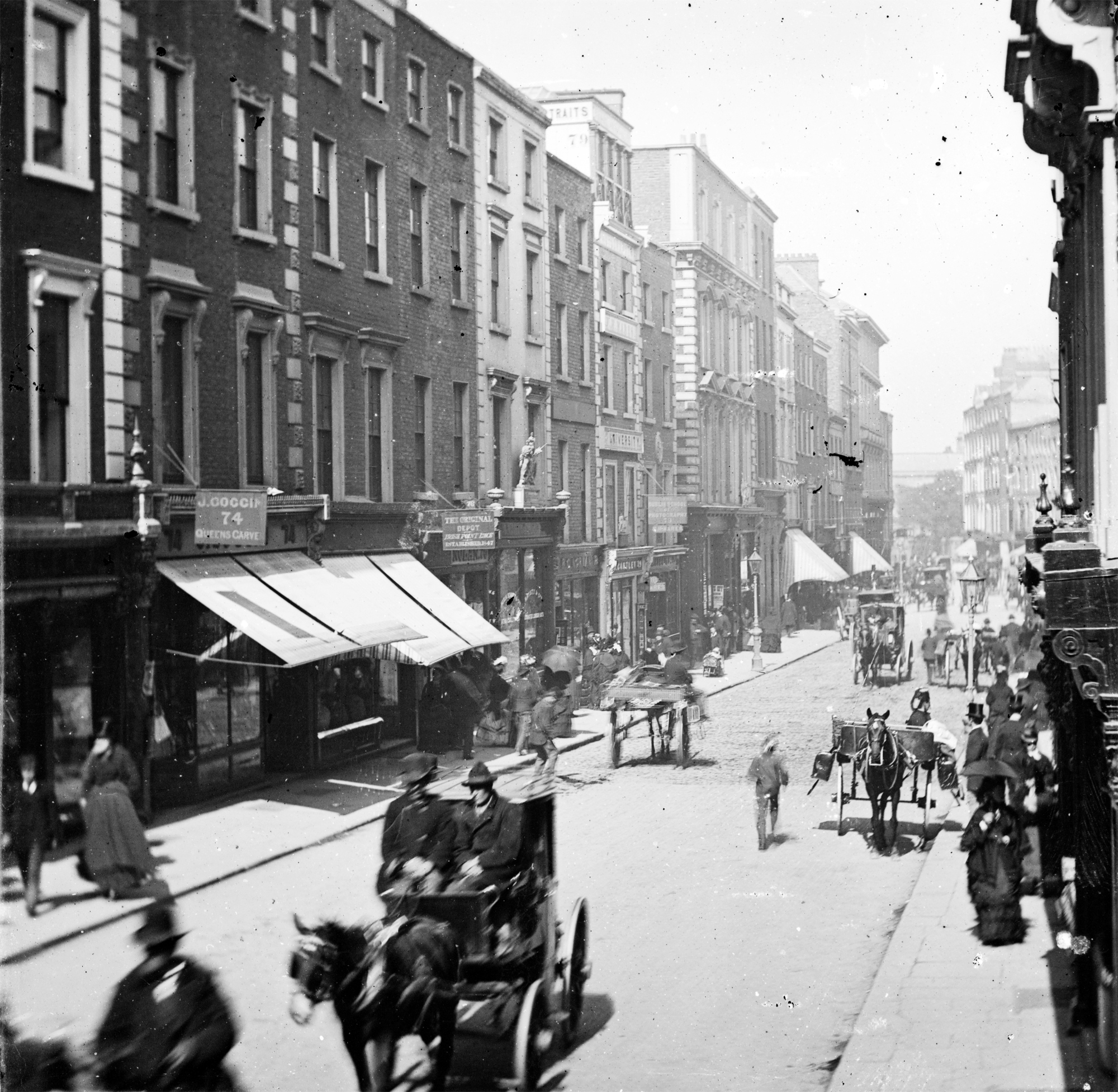
Grafton Street circa 1870

Throughout the 19th century, Grafton Street became increasingly dilapidated. By 1849, several buildings had broken windows that were patched up with paper. In 1862, the Dublin Builder said the street "abounds in old premises in need of doctoring up." During the late 19th century, a number of retail properties were built and several long-standing businesses established their presence on the street, such as the department stores Switzer's and Brown Thomas. The jewellers Weirs opened in 1869.

The street became known for prostitution during this time; in the 1870s, 1,500 prostitutes were reputed to work the street. This was part of a broader phenomenon − in 1870, there were 3,255 arrests for prostitution in Dublin, compared to 2,183 in London and 1,617 in Manchester. Despite complaints that the street was "impassable to virtuous women", Dublin tourist guides continued to mention it as a fashionable place to visit. By the turn of the 20th century, prostitution had moved to the Montgomery Street ("Monto") area on the northern side of the city, somewhat allowing Grafton Street's reputation to recover.

=== 20th and 21st centuries ===
In 1911, King George V and Queen Mary were led in a procession down Grafton Street which attracted thousands of onlookers. The American chain, Woolworth's, opened a store on the street in 1914.

As part of a wider set of proposals to rename a number of Dublin streets in 1921, it was proposed that Grafton Street be renamed Grattan Street in the Report of the Paving Committee by the Dublin Corporation street naming committee. This new naming scheme was not fully implemented. Among the names retained alongside Grafton Street were North Earl Street and Talbot Street. This new name for Grafton Street had first been proposed by a columnist in The Irishman newspaper in 1862.

Woolworth's moved to Nos. 65–68 in 1948. The first Irish McDonald's restaurant opened on the street in 1977. This was followed by the opening of a number of other UK high-street businesses in the 1980s including HMV, Next, River Island, Miss Selfridge, and Marks & Spencer. In 1987, a major fire broke out on Grafton Street in an employment agency above two shops. The fire quickly spread through the property, causing significant damage and closing the street. Five people were hospitalised for shock and smoke inhalation.

Several properties on the street were refurbished in the 1990s. No. 70 was extended in 1992, adding a limestone frontage on the ground floor. Numbers 84–86 were rebuilt the same year in a postmodern brick style.

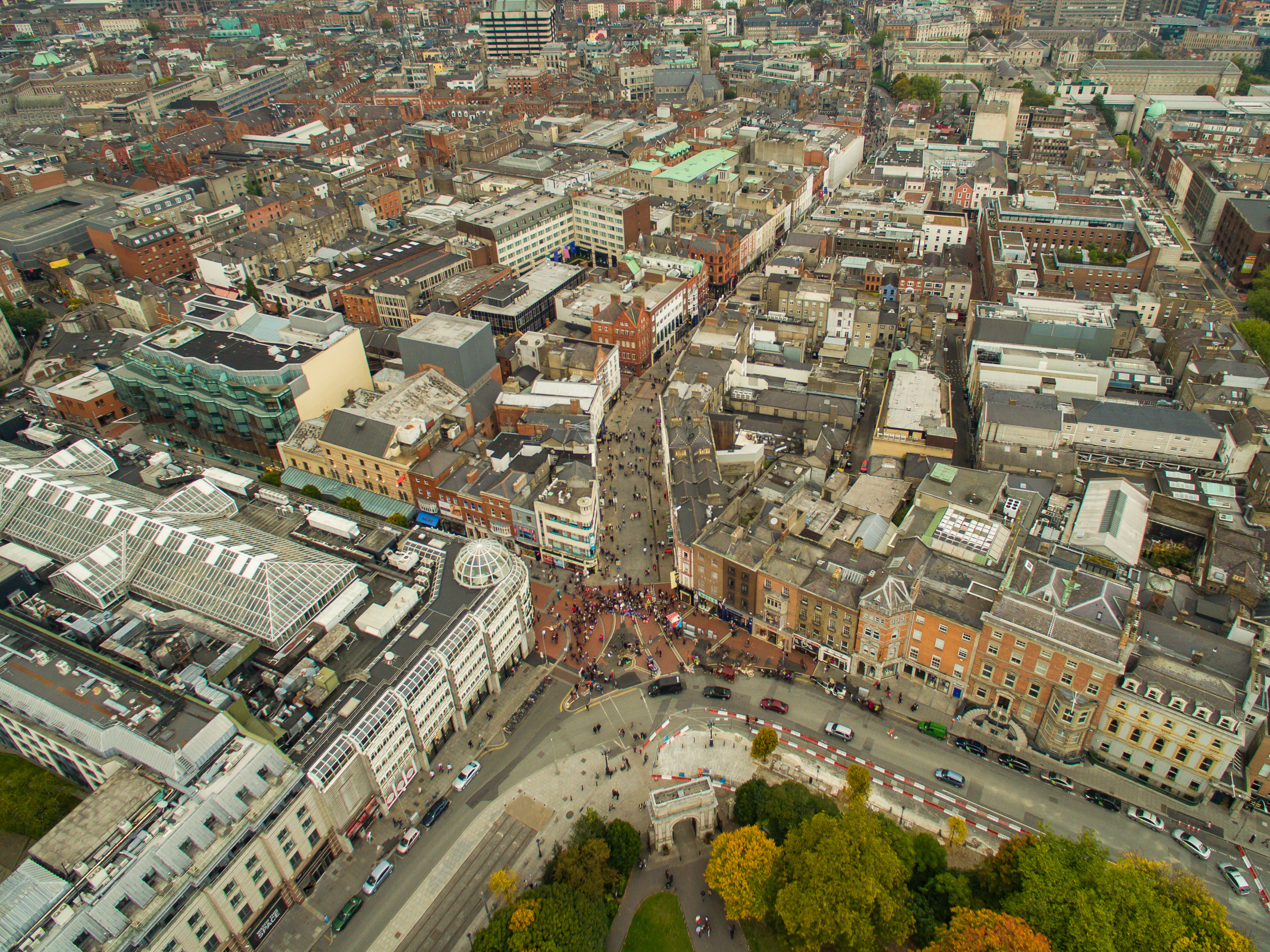
Southern end of Grafton Street, close to Stephens Green, in 2015

In 2008, Grafton Street was the fifth most expensive main shopping street in the world, with rental pricing of €5,621/m^{2}/year, and the thirteenth most expensive main shopping street in the world in 2016 at rental pricing of a much lower region of €3,300/m^{2}/year.

==== Pedestrianisation ====
By the 1960s, Grafton Street had become congested with cars and buses, which caused serious pollution. Pedestrianisation of the street was first trialled in September 1971, for a period of 4 weeks. After many delays, permanent pedestrianisation of most of the street was established in 1982, and the street was then repaved in 1988, with new street lighting also fitted. Objections to pedestrianisation came from councillors and small business owners, who alleged that it would lead to an increase in petty crime and antisocial behaviour. The northern end of the street, between Nassau Street and College Green, one side of which is occupied by the walls of Trinity College, is not pedestrianised.

== Properties ==
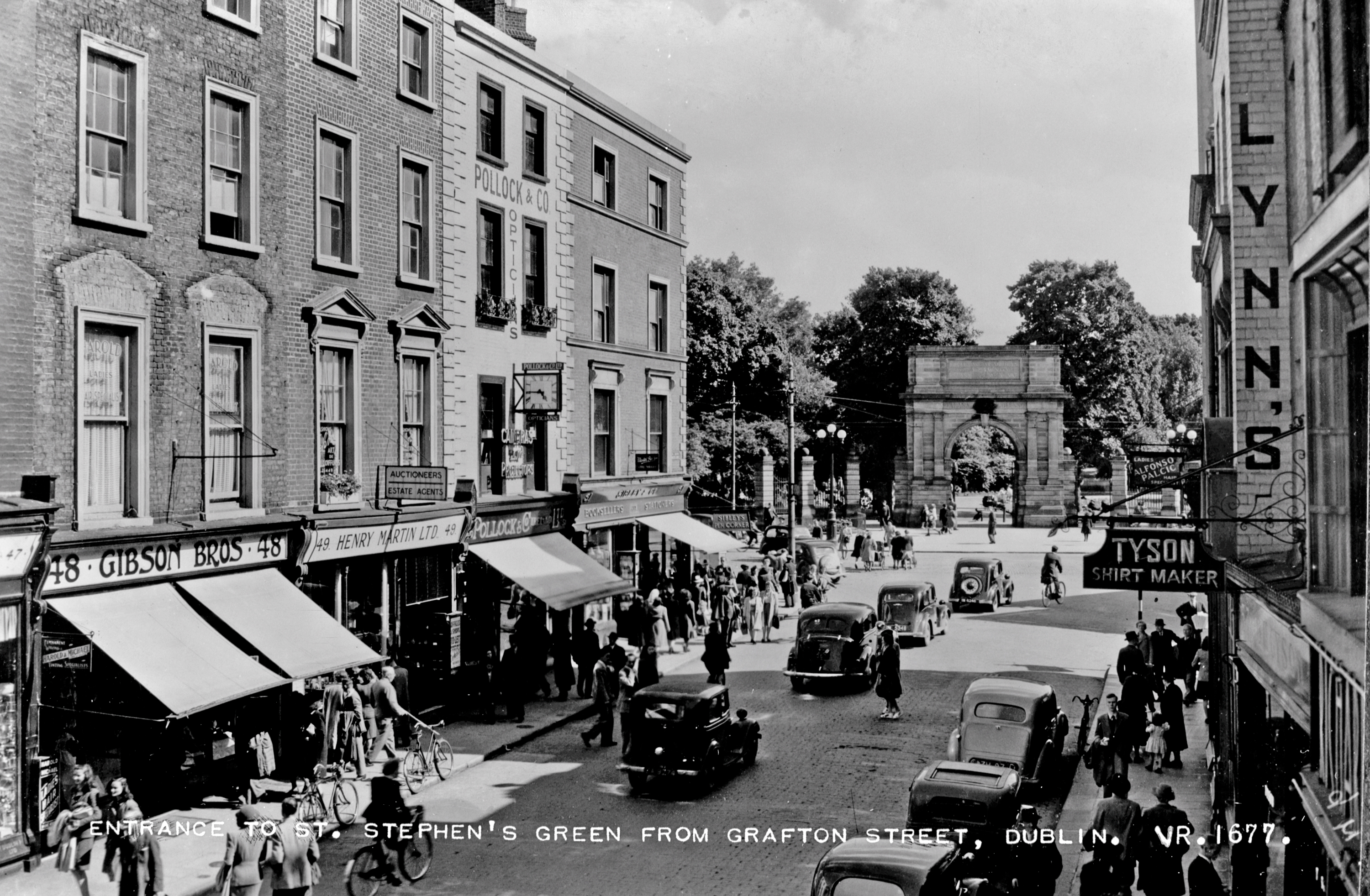
Grafton Street in the 1940s

Grafton Street has had a number of periods of redevelopment in its history, including in the 1860s, 1880s, early 1900s, and 1990s. On some occasions, the demolition of buildings led to the collapse of some of their neighbour's. Altogether, this activity has resulted in a mixture of periods and styles, with few notable interiors or street surfaces extant. Some of the Georgian plot sizes and facades are still visible on some buildings, such as Nos. 31–33 and 63. No. 14 retains the window pattern of an early Dutch Billy house. At the north end of Grafton Street, surviving largely intact, is the Provost's House, Trinity College, home to the head of the college and the University of Dublin.

The English Grammar School was founded at No. 75 Grafton Street in 1758, by Samuel Whyte, first cousin-in-law of the actor and impresario Thomas Sheridan. Students included Richard Brinsley Sheridan, Robert Emmet, Thomas Moore and Arthur Wellesley, 1st Duke of Wellington. It closed in 1824. Hodges Figgis first bookshop was at 104 Grafton Street, opening in 1797. It moved to its current location in Dawson Street in 1920.

Bewley's Oriental Café opened on Grafton Street in 1927, on the site of Whyte's Academy, and became a popular place to gather and socialise. In 2004, it was announced that Bewley's Grafton Street and Westmoreland Street cafés would close, putting 243 jobs at risk. Following a campaign, the café on Grafton Street, which had closed, was reopened. Subject to a €1m redevelopment scheme in 2015, the café closed again following a collapse of trade during the COVID-19 pandemic. The then mayor, Tom Brabazon, expressed a hope that it might re-open after the pandemic.

== Monuments ==
The northern end of the street was for many years the location of the Molly Malone statue, a well-known tourist attraction and meeting place. The statue was moved from Grafton Street to nearby Suffolk Street in 2014, to make way for an extension to the Luas tram system, which runs along the northern part of Grafton Street.

A life-size bronze statue of Dublin musician and leader of Thin Lizzy, Phil Lynott, was unveiled on Harry Street, off Grafton Street near the Stephen's Green end, in August 2005. In May 2013, the statue was tipped over by two vandals, who were subsequently arrested. In 2017, it was damaged after being hit by a truck, and spent several months in repair. The statue has become a well-known tourist attraction for music fans. In keeping with the tendency for Dubliners to nickname statues, it is known to locals as the "Ace with the Bass".

Grafton Street is normally lit with Christmas lights during the festive season – in 2022, it was estimated that around 300,000 bulbs were used to illuminate the street. In 2019, a planned "Nollaig Shona Duit" (Irish for "Happy Christmas") light display was cancelled and replaced with "Grafton Quarter" signage, causing controversy.

== Busking ==
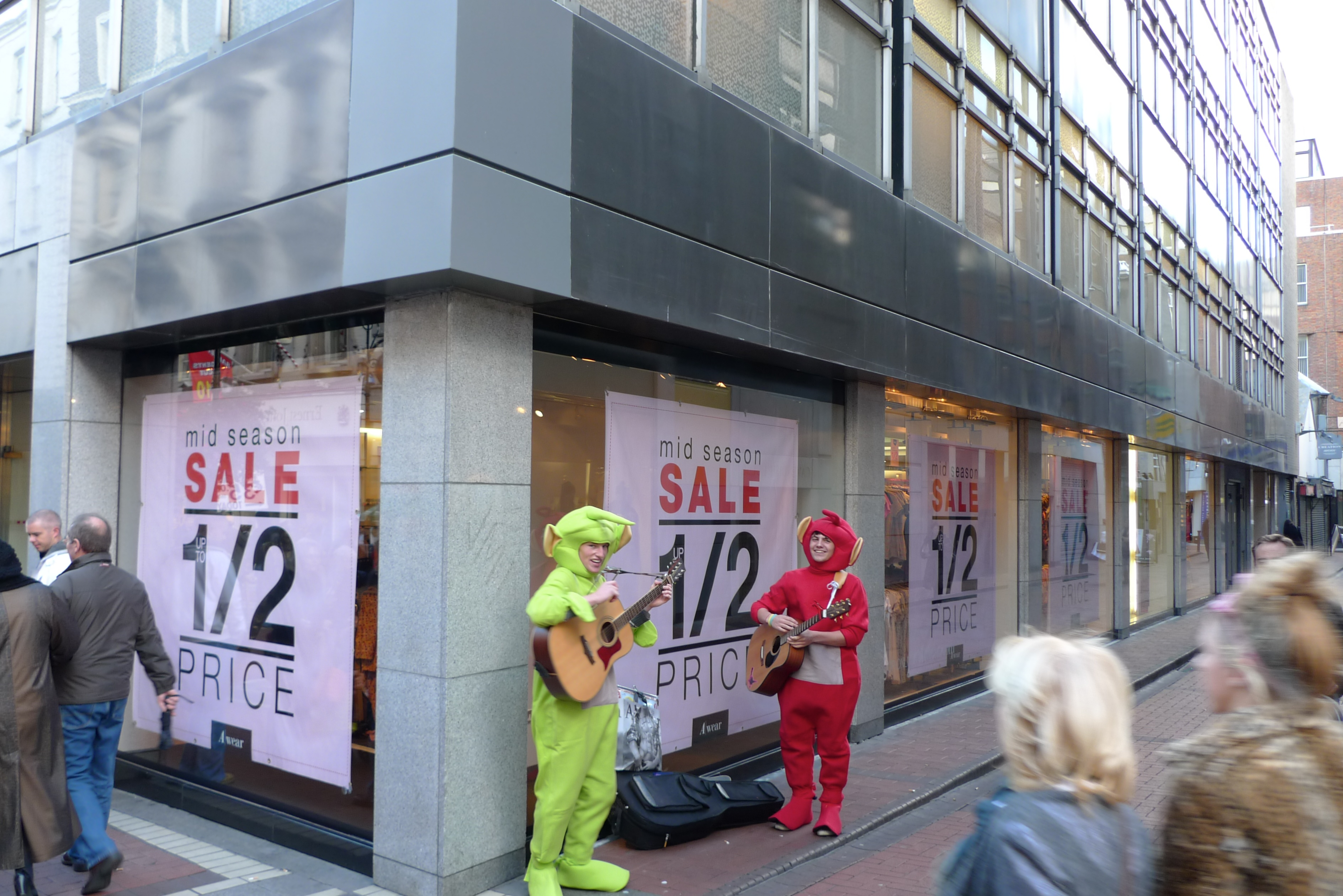
Buskers on Grafton Street in Teletubbies costumes

Since the 1980s, Grafton Street has become internationally known for its street entertainment, particularly busking. Musicians, poets and mime artists commonly perform to the shopping crowds. This was portrayed in the opening scene of the 2007 film Once, starring Glen Hansard of the Frames, a former Grafton Street busker. In Dublin, street performers must pay for a licence to busk (€30 per year as of 2019, plus €60 if using amplification), and on Grafton Street, each such performance is restricted to a maximum of one hour, and a musician cannot play within a 100-metre (330 ft) distance of that location until the following day. Grafton Street has been the traditional home of the "big busk" on Christmas Eve, which aims to raise money for homeless charities.

Grafton Street buskers have included:

- Bono – lead singer of U2, has performed on Christmas Eve
- Paddy Casey – ex-Grafton Street busker and musician
- Mic Christopher – musician
- Dermot Kennedy – Irish singer-songwriter
- Keywest – English-Irish pop rock band based in Dublin
- Chris Martin – frontman of Coldplay, performed with Little Simz, Burna Boy, Tini and Elyanna for a promo video of "We Pray" in August 2024
- Thom McGinty ("The Diceman") – former street performer and actor, during the 1970s–1990s
- David McSavage – stand-up comedy and music, later television performer in The Savage Eye
- John Nee – imitated Charlie Chaplin
- Damien Rice – ex-Grafton Street busker
- Rodrigo y Gabriela – Mexican guitar-playing duo
- Allie Sherlock – YouTube singer, songwriter and guitarist
- Hudson Taylor – musical duo from Dublin

== Cultural references ==
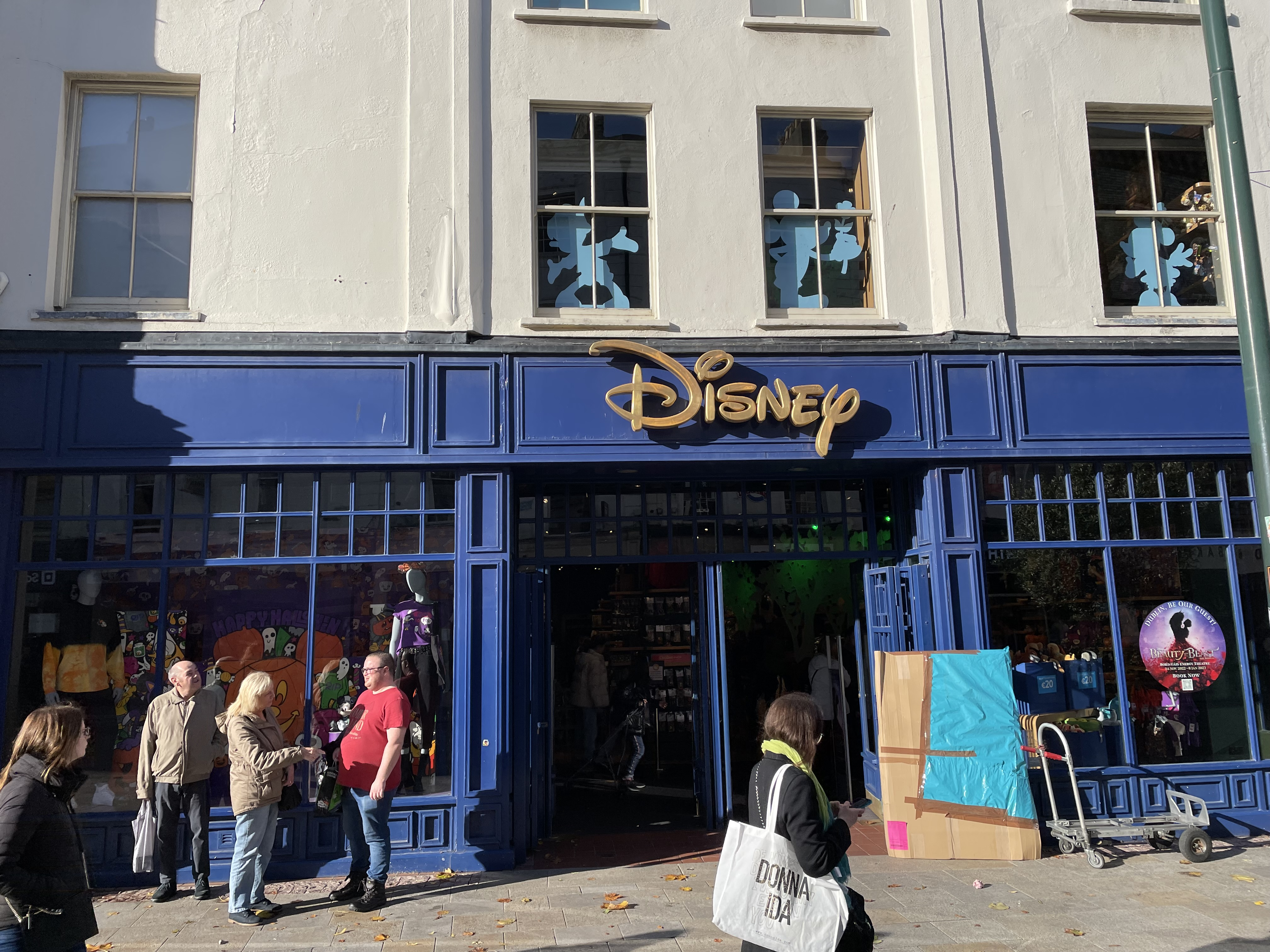
Exterior of the Disney Store on Grafton Street

- Grafton Street is mentioned several times in James Joyce's Dubliners and in A Portrait of the Artist as a Young Man is the scene of the meeting between Stephen and Emma.
- There is a line in the poem "On Raglan Road" by the poet Patrick Kavanagh: "On Grafton Street in November we tripped lightly along the ledge"
- American singer-songwriter Nanci Griffith wrote and recorded a song called "On Grafton Street".
- Bagatelle, an Irish rock band of the 1970s and 1980s, refer to Grafton Street in their song "Summer in Dublin"; "And young people walking down Grafton Street, everyone looking so well".
- Grafton Street has featured on the Irish edition of the board game Monopoly since the first edition in the 1970s.
- Dido features a track entitled "Grafton Street" on her album Safe Trip Home. This song is a tribute to Dido's deceased father, who was Irish.
- Grafton Street is mentioned in Ed Sheeran's song "Galway Girl" on his album ÷ (2017).

== See also ==
- List of streets and squares in Dublin
