= Notaker =

American DJ and producer (born 1989)

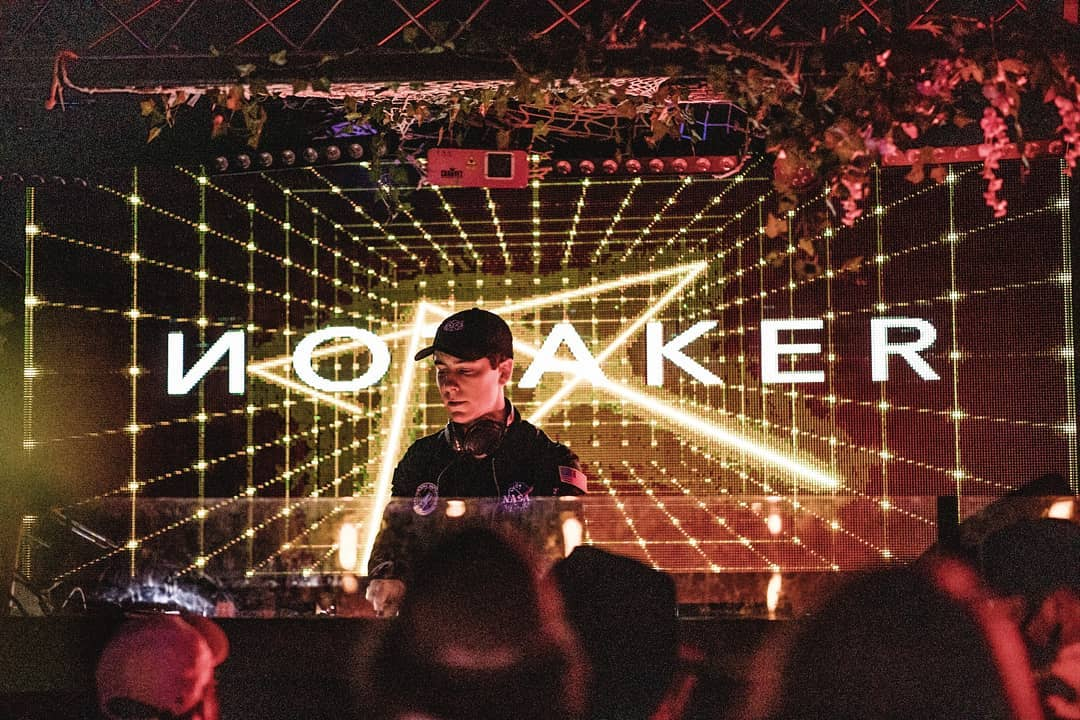
- Notaker in Miami 2019

Background information
- Born: David Nothaker; September 23, 1989 (age 36); St. Louis, Missouri, U.S.
- Genres: Midtempo; progressive house; house; synthwave; synth-pop; trance; new beat
- Occupations: DJ; producer
- Years active: 2015–present
- Labels: Anjunabeats; Bitbird; Monstercat; Armada Captivating; mau5trap; Brooklyn Fire; Zerothree; Positronic Digital
- Website: notakermusic.com

David Nothaker (born September 23, 1989), better known by his stage name Notaker (stylized as И O T A K E R), is an American DJ and producer based in St. Louis, Missouri. He is best known for his midtempo-progressive style and for breakout singles like "Infinite", "Shimmer", and "The Storm" which have amassed over 11 million, 2.5 million, and 3.7 million streams on Spotify respectively. Notaker has performed at music festivals across the United States including Global Dance Festival in Denver, Das Energy in Utah, and Freaky Deaky in Texas.

== Early life ==
Nothaker first got into electronic music after attending his first electronic music show and then being encouraged by a friend to write music. He noted Hans Zimmer, deadmau5, Eric Prydz and M83 as his inspirations.

== Career ==
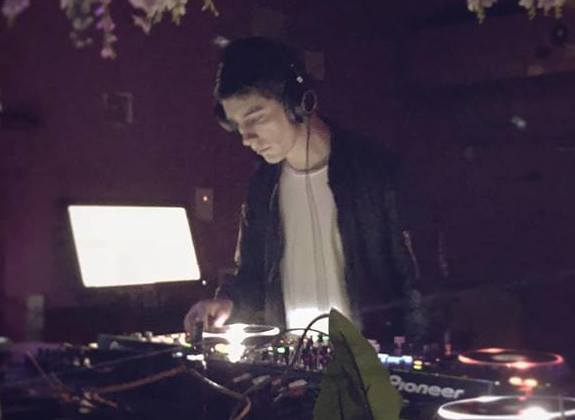
Notaker in 2018

Notaker released his first single, "Oceanview Dr", in September 2015, on Brooklyn Fire Records, a label owned by Tommie Sunshine. He followed up with another single in December 2015 titled "Feel the Rain" released on Zerothree Records. In March 2016, Notaker released his first EP, a three track release self-titled The Notaker EP. The EP consisted of "Dream World Lapse", "Subweapon", and "Monarch (speed of light edit)". The EP was released on Jaytech's Positronic Digital imprint. In April 2016, Notaker released his debut single with Monstercat, "Infinite". He followed up in November 2016 with "Gems" released on Monstercat Notaker was listed by Dancing Astronaut as one of "Dancing Astronaut's 25 Artists to Watch in 2017" The following year in February, Notaker released "Shimmer" with Monstercat He released "Born in the Flames" as a single on March 17, 2017, via Armada Music. On March 24, 2017, Notaker released his first single with Mau5trap titled Abyss, the release was part of the label's We are Friends Volume 6 compilation. On July 5, 2017, he released "Wake Up, You're Dreaming" as part of Monstercat's Rocket League x Monstercat Vol. 1 compilation album. On August 18, 2017, his remix of "Saving Light" by Gareth Emery and Standerwick was included in the official remix package on Monstercat. On October 2, 2017, Notaker released the promotional single for his Genesis EP titled Who I Am. The single featured co-producer Declan James and vocalist Karra with the lyrics co-written by Matthew Steeper. On October 26, the full Genesis EP was released with "Just Close Your Eyes", "So Much Love", "Wake Up, You're Dreaming", "Terra", and the extended mix of "Who I Am" which was released only on beatport.

== Discography ==
=== Extended plays ===
Title	Information
Notaker	Released: April 8, 2016; Label: Positronic Digital; Formats: Digital download
Genesis	Released: October 24, 2017; Label: Monstercat; Formats: Digital download
Erebus I	Released: July 6, 2018; Label: mau5trap; Formats: Digital download
Path.Finder	Released: April 8, 2019; Label: Monstercat; Formats: Digital download

=== Singles ===
Title	Year	Album
"Oceanview Dr."	2015	Non-album singles
"Feel the Rain"	2015	Non-album singles
"Infinite"	2016	Non-album singles
"Gems"	2016	Non-album singles
"Shimmer"	2017	Non-album singles
"Born in the Flames"	2017	Non-album singles
"Abyss"	2017	Non-album singles
"Wake Up, You're Dreaming"	2017	Rocket League x Monstercat Vol. 1 Genesis
"Who I Am" (with Declan James, featuring Karra)	2017	Genesis
"Retribution"	2017	Non-album singles
"Too Smooth" (featuring Grey MTTR)	2018	Non-album singles
"Corrupted" (with BlackGummy)	2018	Erebus I
"The Storm"	2018	Non-album singles
"Into The Light" (featuring Karra)	2019	Path.Finder
"Each Other" (featuring Eric Lumiere)	2019	Rocket League x Monstercat Vol. 6 Path.Finder
"From Dust & Ashes"	2019	Non-album singles
"Airlock"	2021	Non-album singles
"Stratus"	2021	Non-album singles
"Echelon"	2021	Non-album singles
"SMYL"	2021	Non-album singles
"SMYL VIP"	2021	Non-album singles
"OCN"	2021	Non-album singles
"Almost 3am / 4am"	2022	Non-album singles

=== Remixes ===
Title	Year	Original artist(s)	Release
"Future Story"	2016	Jaytech	Awakening (Remixes)
"Saving Light" (featuring Haliene)	2017	Gareth Emery and Standerwick	Saving Light (The Remixes)
"Tell Me"	2019	Haywyre	Panorama: Discover Remixes
"Written Maze"	2020	Droeloe	A Promise Is Made (Remixes)
