= Erebus I =

2018 EP by Notaker

EP by Notaker
- Released: July 6, 2018
- Recorded: 2017–18
- Genres: New beat; wonky; ambient
- Length: 22:17
- Label: Mau5trap
- Producers: David Nothaker; Iman Marouf; Mathew Kazmierowski; Dillon Wong

Notaker chronology
Genesis (2017)	Erebus I (2018)	Path.Finder (2019)

Singles from Erebus I
- 1. "Corrupted" Released: June 26, 2018

Erebus I is the third extended play by American electronic music producer Notaker. It was released by Canadian record label mau5trap on July 6, 2018. It contains five songs, including collaborations with American DJ and producer BlackGummy and Canadian electronic music duo Eminence. The first single "Corrupted" was released on June 26, 2018.

== Background and release ==
The collaborative tracks "Corrupted" (with Blackgummy) and "Machina" (with Eminence) were both produced separately around the same time using the same base song. Notaker met with both artists in person but the collaborations were primarily done through file sharing audio stems on Dropbox. Notaker stated "It was really interesting to see how each record turned out so differently and how my style complemented my collaborators’ styles".

Notaker conceived the extended play as an expansion of his Vessel series, following his previous work Genesis released in 2017. He did this by creating an ambiguous science fiction story about the Vessel using the tracklist order, mood and creating unique artwork for each of the songs featured in Erebus I (which were all later used to comprise the artwork for the extended play). The extended play's promotional mix features various audio clips from movies that Notaker had drawn inspiration from, including Interstellar, 2001: A Space Odyssey and Alien.

The story of the extended play follows The Vessel, as its A.I. experiences a fatal system error after travelling through a wormhole. The A.I. turns corrupt and becomes hostile towards the crew, forcing many of them to jettison while the remaining crew cut the power supply to the A.I. The crew are then forced to travel back through the wormhole without any guidance or help from the A.I.

Notaker has described his more recent style of music as darker and more abstract compared to his earlier works, experimenting with gritty distorted textures in his sounds and attempting to write his music in a less conventional manner. Ian Thompson of EDMTunes noted Notaker as one of several artists in the forefront of the new beat subgenre alongside Rezz and 1788-L. Notaker wrote that the subgenre had become increasingly popular in recent times, describing it as a "fresh sound that’s been generally unexplored in the mainstream electronic realm. The range of which you can produce in this tempo range can be extremely gritty and heavy to really melodic and beautiful to calm, relaxing and atmospheric."

The single "Corrupted" was released as a digital download on June 26, 2018. The extended play was released ten days later on 6 July 2018. The extended play is named after the primordial deity who represents the personification of darkness.

== Critical reception ==
Erebus I was well received by most critics. Writing for Respect My Region, Austin Howell stated that Notaker was "Doing his part in bringing a unique sound to the industry", further describing him as similar to other new beat artists such as Rezz and 1788-L as they all "use similar sounds, which are bass-heavy with a sort of darkness and sci-fi sound." He later praised the extended play, writing "Notaker was able to go full force with his latest work, bringing every sound that one must hear to make up a good song." RaverRafting's Tori Matthews stated that Notaker "definitely takes you for a ride", writing that it was a "totally different experience of listening to music that we haven’t seen in quite a while." Alice Andrei of EDM Nations described the extended play as tied together by "an assortment of mystic, dark undertones that build into knife cut, hard electro drops that show a side of Notaker that fans have never seen before." Writing for EDM Identity, Grant Gilmore claimed that it was Notakers best work yet, writing that it "offers up that intergalactic, space-fueled sound that will have you travelling the depths of the galaxy while listening, perfect for those dark rooms and late night drives through the night." Magnetic Magazine's Ryan Middleton described the extended play as a combination of sounds "both gritty and melodic, blending soothing progressive with harder electro". A writer for T.H.E Music Essentials wrote that it "delivers a stunningly diverse array of tracks that takes listeners on a rollercoaster of bass-drenched sounds."

The extended play's single "Corrupted" was well received by most critics. Writing for Dancing Astronaut, Robyn Dexter wrote that the song leaned into the "shadowy side of the artists' production", describing the song as "simultaneously crisp and clean, showcasing both artists’ stellar production style." A writer for T.H.E Music Essentials described the song as "glitch-infused", drawing parallels between the song's style with the likes of Rezz and 1788-L, describing it as "dark and other-worldly". EDMTunes' Lily Voss called the song a "twisty, bass heavy trip in a rocket ship", describing the song as "flawless blend of their two divergent sounds while taking your mind throughout a black hole." Brett Zera of EDM Chicago stated that the song "beautifully showcases both Notaker and Blackgummy’s bass drenched sounds." Writing for EDM Sauce, Jim Babaoglu wrote that the song begins by "slowly pulling you into a fantasy world", stating that Notaker has "proven his ability to create vast cinematic soundscapes and this intro is a delightful example of his talents."

== Track listing ==
Digital download
No.	Title	Producer(s)	Length
1.	"Fatal System Error"	Notaker	4:53
2.	"Corrupted" (with BlackGummy)	Notaker; BlackGummy	4:30
3.	"Hypersleep"	Notaker	3:39
4.	"Machina" (with Eminence)	Notaker; Eminence	4:33
5.	"Believe"	Notaker	3:42
Total length:			22:17

== Release history ==
Region	Date	Format	Label	Ref.
Worldwide	July 6, 2018	Digital download	mau5trap	
