= Margaret Hamilton Reid =

Irish businesswoman

- Born: 9 October 1912; Dublin, Ireland
- Died: 11 April 2010 (aged 97); Dublin
- Occupation: Businesswoman
- Known for: Switzer & Company department stores

Margaret Hamilton Reid (9 October 1912 - 11 April 2010) was an Irish business woman, who was the chair of Switzer & Company department stores in Dublin from 1956 to 1972. She was the first woman to chair a publicly quoted Irish company.

== Life ==
Margaret Hamilton Reid was born on 9 October 1912 in Dublin. One of her first memories was seeing the buildings on O'Connell Street burn during the Easter 1916 Rising. Her grandfather, John Hamilton Reid, co-founded Switzer & Company in 1890. Reid was an only child, and at age 15 attended her first annual general meeting of Switzers. Reid was elected to the board at a young age. When she was elected chair of the board in 1956, Reid became the first female chair of a publicly quoted Irish company, and referred to herself as chairman, not chairperson.

Under her chairmanship, Switzers expanded to include Cashs of Cork, Todd's of Limerick, and Moon's of Galway. During this time there was briefly a branch of Switzers on Henry Street, Dublin. She served as chair until 1972, when the company was taken over by Waterford Glass and House of Fraser. After the take over, Reid served on the board of Waterford Glass. Reid maintained that Switzers should never stock anything which could be "detrimental to humankind" and under her leadership the mantra of the company was "The sale you know is genuine." She believed that her company should be held to the highest ethical standards so that the accounts "could be put on the communion table."

Reid was a member of the Girl Guides for 83 years, and in 1950 served as an aide de camp to Lady Baden-Powell during her visit to Ireland to open the Baden-Powell Memorial Cottage in Enniskerry, County Wicklow. She also served as an international commissioner representing Ireland at international conferences for 14 years. Reid was an elder of Abbey Presbyterian Church for 46 years and served as a trustee of the Presbyterian Church in Ireland, sat on its board, and was a member of the Inter-church Relations Board. She was a member of the Young Women's Christian Association, serving as chair of the Trust Corporation, later president, and was awarded an honorary life membership. She was a founding member of the Irish School of Ecumenics, serving as a trustee for 40 years. She also sat on the board of Gurteen Agricultural College.

She was a car enthusiast, and drove one of only three Jensen Interceptors in Ireland, later driving a Jaguar. When Reid was asked if she regretted anything, her answer was "Yes, I never drove a Formula 1." In 2008, she was photographed on a Garda motor-bike outside the Royal Dublin Society. She last renewed her driving licence for 3 years at age 97. Reid was the first woman elected as committee member of the Royal Alfred Yacht Club and the first woman member of the Royal St George Yacht Club.

She lived in Rathgar, in the house her grandfather built around 1880. She hosted a number of visitors there, including Cliff Richard, Dr Billy Graham, and Chuck Colson. She also hosted a family from Kosovo who were refugees until they became Irish citizens. She died on 11 April 2010. She is buried at St Patrick's, Enniskerry.
