= Christmas FM =

- Dublin; Ireland
- Broadcast area: Ireland
- Frequency: Various
- RDS: XMAS
- Branding: The Magic of Christmas

Programming
- Language: English
- Format: Christmas Music
- Subchannels: Christmas FM Classics; Christmas FM Classical
- Network: Radiohub

Ownership
- Sister stations: All Classical, Rewind DAB+

History
- First air date: November 2008

Links
- Website: christmasfm.com

Christmas FM is a seasonal radio station based in Ireland dedicated to Christmas-themed music, billed as "Ireland's Christmas Station". Airing during the Christmas season, it is a temporary licensed station, traditionally broadcasting from 28 November until 27 December since 2008. The station streams over the internet and maintains social media presence, with the station and its subchannels continuing to broadcast via its internet stream in the time between.

== History ==
It began broadcasting in Dublin in 2008. Cork was added in 2009. Limerick, Galway and the South East of Ireland were added in 2010. With the inclusion of an additional transmitter, Kildare was added in 2011 and 2012. In 2013, transmitters were added in the North Midlands, in the North East and in North Wicklow.

In 2018 the station broadcast network was in Sligo 95.0, Dublin 105.2, Cork 106.7, Galway 87.7, Naas 88.1, South East 103.8, Nth East 99.4, Nth Midlands 101.6, Kilkenny 104.3, Wicklow 106.6, Nth Wicklow 99.5, Limerick 105.5, Ennis/Clare 105.2, Letterkenny 105.7, Kllarney/Tralee 105.0.

The format is music driven with the addition of Christmas-themed content, billed as trying to bring the 'Magic of Christmas'. As a temporary licensed station it does not carry commercial advertising but does have both on-air and online sponsors to cover operational costs each year.

Dunnes Stores and Cadbury were the main sponsors of the station for 2017, and in 2018 Coca-Cola joined these two main sponsors.

== Charity work ==
The station has chosen charity partners in each of its broadcast years with the objective of raising awareness and funds for the partner. Funds are raised through a mixture of premium SMS, on-line and in-branch donation. 100% of listener donations go directly to the chosen charity. Charity partners are listed below:

- 2008: ISPCC, raising €35,000
- 2009: Simon Communities Dublin and Cork, raising €70,000
- 2010: Barnardos, raising €86,000
- 2011: Focus Ireland, raising €117,000
- 2012: ISPCC/Childline, raising €100,000
- 2013: Aware raising €85,000
- 2014: Age Action, raising €107,000
- 2015: Make-A-Wish Foundation, raising €278,000
- 2016: Focus Ireland, raising €365,000
- 2017: Sightsavers Ireland, raising €214,000
- 2018: Temple Street Children's University Hospital, raising €404,551
- 2019: Barretstown, raising €412,021
- 2020: ALONE, raising €284,000
- 2021: Barnardos raising €331.515
- 2022 - 2025: The Magic of Christmas Initiative - Barnardos, Barretstown, Make-A-Wish Foundation,

Christmas FM also operates a song competition in the run up to the broadcast period with the short list being aired for a listener voted winner to be selected.

== Online stations ==
Christmas FM also operates two online-only Christmas themed music stations: Christmas FM Classical and Christmas FM Classics.

== Staff ==
The station is staffed by approximately 100 volunteers and provides a 24-hour service during the license period. The voice-over used in many of Christmas FM's charity promotional appeals since 2008 belonged to Bob Gallico (1930–2013).

The founders of the station were Paul Shepard, Walter Hegarty, Garvan Rigby and Daragh O'Sullivan. It was conceived by Garvan Rigby. All had previous experience in pirate radio and in temporary licensed stations, with the first two having been among the principals of temporary licensed Premier FM.
