= Ditch the Label =

Youth organization

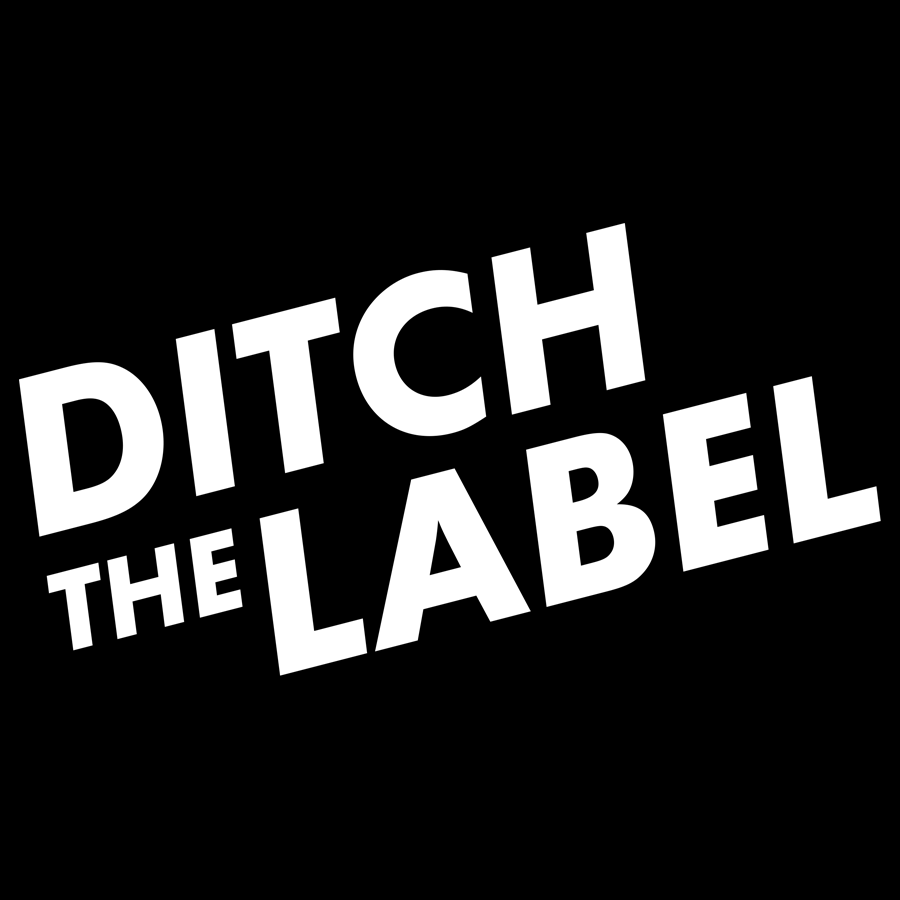
- Founded: 2012
- Founder: Liam Hackett
- Type: Nonprofit
- Location: United Kingdom
- Region served: United Kingdom, United States of America, Mexico
- Key people: Liam Hackett
- Website: ditchthelabel.org
- Known as "Deja Las Etiquetas" in Mexico

Ditch the Label is a British non-profit charity organization. They operate Ditch the Label Education, which provides free educational resources for schools and colleges in served areas.

== History ==
After his own experiences as a victim of bullying, founder and current CEO of Ditch the Label, Liam Hackett, posted about his experiences on the Internet in 2015. In 2006, Hackett launched a MySpace profile to host the conversations and named it "Ditch the Label". Hackett approached the local Chamber of Commerce in 2007.

In 2012, Hackett graduated with a degree in business and management from the University of Sussex and immediately registered Ditch the Label as a legal entity and began to develop the organisation. In March 2014, Ditch the Label was officially registered as a charity in the UK.

In 2015, Ditch the Label announced plans to expand across the United States and Mexico. In 2016, Ditch the Label launched the fifth Annual Bullying Survey in the House of Commons of the United Kingdom.

== Researches ==
=== The Cyberbullying Report (2013) ===
The Cyberbullying Report (2013) is a report with a bullying-related data set of around 10,000 young people and questions surrounding cyberbullying and the use of digital technology. It was published in October 2013.

=== The Annual Bullying Survey (2013–present) ===
Every year, Ditch the Label partners with schools and colleges across the UK to conduct a survey about bullying amongst 13–18 year olds.

=== The Gender Report (2016) ===
The Gender Report (2016) covered the topic of gender in people aged 13–25 throughout the United Kingdom and internationally. The research was focused on the definition of gender, gender roles, and the bullying young people experience.

=== Masculinity and Misogyny in the Digital Age (2016) ===
In conjunction with the company Brandwatch, Ditch the Label explored misogynistic behaviour and ideas of masculinity on Twitter by analyzing 19 million tweets over a four-year period. The report was supported by British politician Caroline Lucas and subsequently presented at a parliamentary reception in the House of Commons of the United Kingdom in October 2016.

=== The Scale of Transphobia Online ===
The research analysed 10 million posts on the topic of transgender identity across the UK and the US over a period of three-and-a-half years. It labeled 1.5 million of those comments as being transphobic.

== Partnerships ==
- Habbo (2013–2016): In August 2013, the organisation joined the Finnish virtual social networking service Habbo. The organisation ran bullying-awareness campaigns on the social network.
- Axe (2016–present): Based on the 2016 edition of the Annual Bullying Survey, which concluded that the majority of those who bully are male, Ditch the Label joined with the brand Axe (known in the UK as Lynx).
- River Island (2018–2018): To coincide with River Island's 30th anniversary, they partnered to release limited edition t-shirts with the mantra "Labels are for clothes, not people!". An accompanying hashtag "#LabelsAreForClothes" was encouraged for social media sharing. The campaign was met with general positivity.
- Tumblr (2020–present): Tumblr and Ditch the Label created a campaign titled "World Wide What" to educate digital literacy using videos.

== Celebrity ambassadors ==
- Bully band
- Sunflower Bean band
- Holly Hagan from Geordie Shore
- Little Mix
- Latrice Royale from RuPaul's Drag Race
- Bea Miller
- Tom Rosenthal from Friday Night Dinner
- Stefanie Reid Paralympian
- Gok Wan
- Christian Jessen
- Thelma Madine from Big Fat Gypsy Weddings
