= Bernard Lewis (entrepreneur) =

English businessman (1926–2026)

- Born: Bernard Pokrasse; 10 February 1926
- Died: 28 February 2026 (aged 100)
- Education: Jewish Free School; Northern Polytechnic Institute
- Occupations: Founder and owner, River Island
- Spouse: Vanessa Bracey (second wife)
- Children: 5

Bernard Lewis (born Bernard Pokrasse, 10 February 1926 – 28 February 2026) was an English businessman, who was the founder and owner of the River Island fashion brand and clothing chain.

== Early life ==
Bernard Lewis was born on 10 February 1926, and educated at the Jewish Free School, and Northern Polytechnic Institute. He helped in his parents' greengrocer's as a child and acquired valuable skills such as learning how to price stock, understand customers' preferences and reduce waste. He served in the RAF from 1944 to 1945.

== Career ==
Lewis opened his first fruit and vegetable shop in the North London area (on Holloway Road) at the age of 20 and began selling clothing, primarily blouses and skirts, then dresses, in the 1940s. His first clothes shop was in Mare Street, Hackney.

During the 1970s, he launched a chain of clothing stores, later called Chelsea Girl.

Lewis also founded Lewis Separates.

He founded the Lewis Trust Group with his elder brother David and younger brother Geoffrey, but the latter two left in 1977.

Lewis was estimated to be worth £1,030 million (€1,484 million). In 2015, he was at position 83 on the Sunday Times Rich List.

At the age of 96, Lewis was said to be working five days a week at the company's headquarters, although in 2016 River Island became run by his nephew, Ben Lewis.

== Personal life and death ==
His "right-hand man in the 1970s" was Leonard, his elder son from his first marriage. In 1968, he married Jennifer Oldham, née Johnston, who modeled and acted under the name Jenny Meredith. She died in 1975.

In 1981, he married Vanessa Bracey, a buyer for Chelsea Girl since 1970, and with whom he had been in a relationship since 1972. They have two sons, Sam and Jacob.

Lewis turned 100 on 10 February 2026, and died 18 days later, on 28 February.
