= Genesis (EP) =

EP by Notaker
- Released: October 24, 2017
- Recorded: 2017
- Genres: Synthwave; synthpop; trance; new beat
- Length: 22:26
- Label: Monstercat
- Producer: David Nothaker

Notaker chronology
Notaker (2016)	Genesis (2017)	Erebus I (2018)

Singles from Genesis
- 1. "Who I Am" Released: October 2, 2017

Genesis is the second extended play by American electronic music producer Notaker. Genesis was released on October 24, 2017, by the independent electronic music label, Monstercat.

== Release ==
On September 26, 2017, Monstercat released an unidentified teaser video for the extended play across social media with the caption "Just close your eyes...", presenting, what Jim Babaoglu of EDM Sauce described as a "black and white image of what appears to be some sort of vessel with cubes attached to it". On October 2, Monstercat revealed Notaker as the artist behind the teaser, releasing the second single for the extended play, Who I Am, featuring vocals by Karra and co-produced by American house producer Declan James. Upon release, Nothaker commented on the extended play, stating:

Through the years I’ve always dreamed about putting out a collection of music that defines the artist I am, today I get to share a little piece of that with you. I’m proud to show you guys my biggest release to date, the Genesis EP.

== Critical reception ==
Angus Paterson of DJ Mag praised the extended play, rating it a 9 out of 10 stating "Notaker imbues his brand of bubbly progressive with a certain cinematic flair, plus a genuine musicality with his arrangements, and he pushes this to the next level on Genesis", later stating "Proof that Notaker counts among the best on the hyper-melodic end of the progressive spectrum". Tori Matthews of Raver Rafting stated "Genesis is just another excellent showcase of the growing talent and reach that Notaker has created for himself".

Jeanette Kats of Noiseporn praised the album, stating "Genesis is a five-track compilation that features the diverse range of his production abilities, from previously released commercial hit Who I Am, to more underground and progressive works like So Much Love. With five distinctly different elements, the EP as a whole is about as stunning as they come". Landon Fleury of Your EDM stated "With Genesis‘ full release finally upon us, we can now be certain that Notaker fully meant what he said; the EP is a musical journey in every aspect".

Jim Babaoglu of EDM Sauce stated "The six-track work of art showcases how far St. Louis based producer has come in such a short time. I have been yelling from the hilltops to anyone that will listen that Notaker is the future, and by the sound of this latest EP I can safely say I was right". Lauren Ikenn of This Song Slaps stated "The talented DJ/producer dropped a brand new EP on Monstercat and, it’s safe to say, it exceeded all expectations. Genesis features 5 incredible tracks, all unique in their own way".

== Track listing ==
No.	Title	Length
1.	"Just Close Your Eyes"	2:14
2.	"Wake Up, You're Dreaming"	4:18
3.	"Who I Am" (with Declan James, featuring Karra)	3:31
4.	"So Much Love"	7:23
5.	"Terra"	4:58
Total length:		22:26
