= Liam Hackett =

British activist (born 1991)

Liam Hackett MBE, FRSA
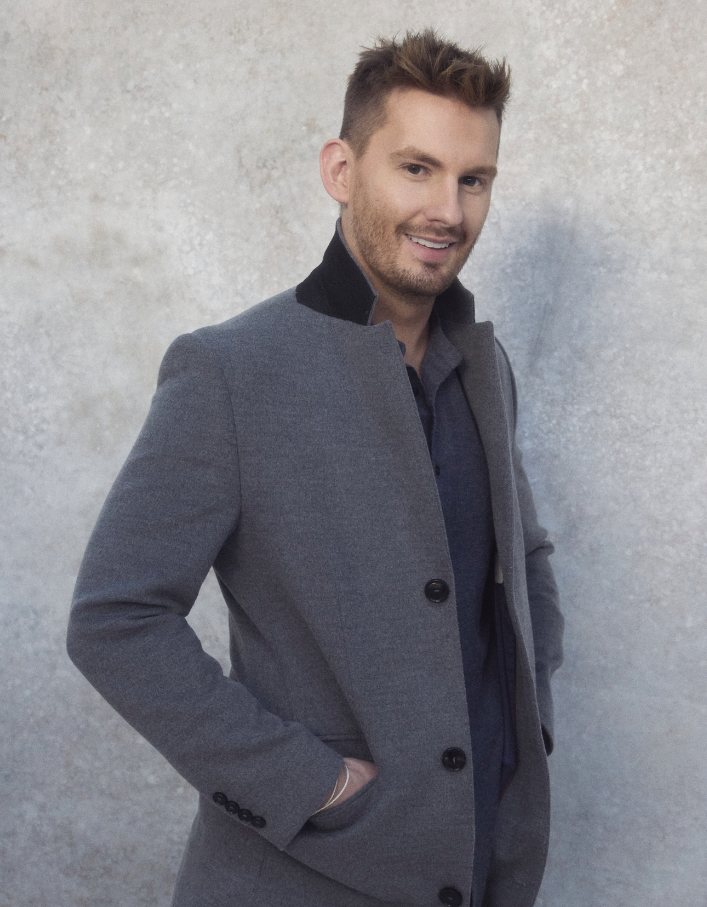
- Hackett in 2023
- Born: 19 January 1991 (age 35); St Helens, England
- Citizenship: United Kingdom
- Education: University of Sussex
- Occupations: Social entrepreneur, activist
- Years active: 2012–present
- Known for: Founder of Ditch the Label
- Notable work: Fearless (2020)
- Honours: Order of the British Empire, honorary doctorate (University of Sussex), Fellow of the Royal Society of Arts
- Website: https://www.hali.foundation/

Liam Hackett MBE (born 19 January 1991) is a British social entrepreneur and activist. He founded the youth charity Ditch the Label in 2006 and led the organisation until leaving in 2024. During his time at Ditch the Label, his work focused on mental health, technology and young people, and he advised the British, European and American governments. He also spoke and wrote at the United Nations on cyberbullying and its implications for human rights.

In 2017, Hackett became the youngest person to receive an honorary degree from the University of Sussex. He was appointed a Member of the Order of the British Empire (MBE) in the 2024 New Year Honours for services to young people.

Since leaving Ditch the Label, Hackett's work has focused on the psychedelic sector. In 2026, he founded HALI Foundation, a UK organisation working in psychedelic medicine education, harm reduction, public dialogue and policy reform, and GrovePass, a technology platform focused on safety and standards in the psychedelic retreat sector.

== Psychedelic sector ==
Since 2026, Hackett's work has focused on psychedelics. He founded HALI Foundation, a UK organisation working in psychedelic medicine education, harm reduction, public dialogue and policy reform.

In 2026, HALI Foundation partnered with Drug Science on work advocating for reform of the legal classification of psilocybin in the United Kingdom.

Hackett also founded GrovePass, a technology platform focused on safety and standards in the psychedelic retreat sector.

== Controversies ==
In 2019, Hackett publicly called out Brighton Pride for their alleged discrimination against pride-goers with a disability after his relatives were confined to a ‘disability tent’ with no view of the stage. A backlash ensued with thousands turning to Twitter, with many sharing their own experiences and some calling for a complete boycott."Brighton Pride sorry over lack of disabled access to Kylie's show". BBC. 5 August 2019.Duffy, Nick (5 August 2019). "Disabled people confined to 'access tent' during Kylie Minogue Brighton Pride show". Pink News.

== Accolades ==
- Appointed Member of the Order of the British Empire (MBE) in the 2024 New Year Honours for services to young people."Liam Hackett MBE". University of Sussex.
- Top 30 charity chief executive on social media."Top 30 charity chief executives on social media in 2016 announced". www.civilsociety.co.uk.
- Received a grant from St Helens Chamber of Commerce before he was 18, enabling him to launch the Ditch the Label website, which later evolved into the charity (2007)."History". Ditch the Label.
- Shortlisted for “Entrepreneur of the Year” and “Organisation of the Year” – National Diversity Awards (2013)."Nominations open for the National Diversity Awards 2013". 13 May 2013.
- Fellow of the Royal Society of Arts – FRSA (2014)."'Ditch the Label' CEO receives honour". 15 August 2014.
- Winner of “Best European Marketing Campaign 2014” in the European Diversity Awards (2014).
- Winner of “Young Business Person of the Year” in the Sussex Business Awards for his work with Ditch the Label (2014)."WINNERS REVEALED AT 26th SUSSEX BUSINESS AWARDS – Sussex Business Awards".
- Winner of “European Campaigner of the Year” – Highly Commended in European Diversity Awards (2015)."The 2015 European Diversity Awards – Shortlist Revealed". BoardroomMum.
- Notable Alumni – University of Sussex."Liam Hackett : Spotlight on: alumni stories". University of Sussex.
