= Afternoon Tea (biscuits) =

Irish biscuit brand

Afternoon Tea is a selection of biscuits which is regarded as a "Christmas family favourite" in Ireland. Of the traditional biscuit selections available ahead of the festive season, the Afternoon Tea variety outsells the others. It is produced by Jacob's.

According to Conor Pope of The Irish Times, Afternoon Tea from the 1970s "had large rings of oddly orange-coloured biscuits slathered in chocolate, small sister rings with sugary red jellies on top, sugary shortbread, more than a handful of chocolate fingers and loads of pink wafers".

In 2014, the jelly star was controversially replaced with a chocolate wheel.
