= River Island =

British fashion company

River Island Clothing Co. Limited
- Type: Private company
- Industry: Fashion, clothing, textiles, retail
- Founded: 1948; 78 years ago: Lewis Separates
- Founder: Bernard Lewis and brothers
- Headquarters: London, England, United Kingdom
- Number of locations: Head Office: West London Tech Hub: East London
- Key people: Will Kernan (CEO); Bernard Lewis (Founder, President); Clive Lewis (Deputy Chairman, son of Bernard Lewis); Ben Lewis (Non-Executive, nephew of Bernard Lewis); Vanessa Lewis (Creative Director, Bernard's wife); Leonard Lewis (Non-Executive, son of Bernard Lewis)
- Products: Women's, men's and children's clothing, footwear, sportswear and accessories
- Revenue: £879.5m (2019)
- Operating income: £52.5m (as EBITDA) (2019)
- Owner: Families of Bernard and David Lewis
- Parent: Lewis Trust Group
- Divisions: Womenswear, menswear, kidswear
- Website: RiverIsland.com

River Island Clothing Co. Limited (stylised as RiverIsland and abbreviated as RI) is a London-based, multi-channel fashion brand, founded in 1948 by Bernard Lewis. The retailer has a presence in over 125 countries, in stores and online.

Best known for its trend-focused womenswear offering, River Island also has menswear, kidswear and pet collections. River Island's collections are entirely designed in-house at the brand's West London head office, and it was one of the first vertical fashion retailers in the UK. In the 1960s, it became an influential name in the womenswear fashion scene, under its previous name: Chelsea Girl.

Today, River Island is considered a key player on the UK high street, with 250 stores across the country, including flagship locations in London, Liverpool, Manchester and Birmingham, plus a significant online presence. In recent years, the business has expanded internationally, and continued to grow its online offer.

River Island is a private company, and remains fully owned by the Lewis family.

== History ==
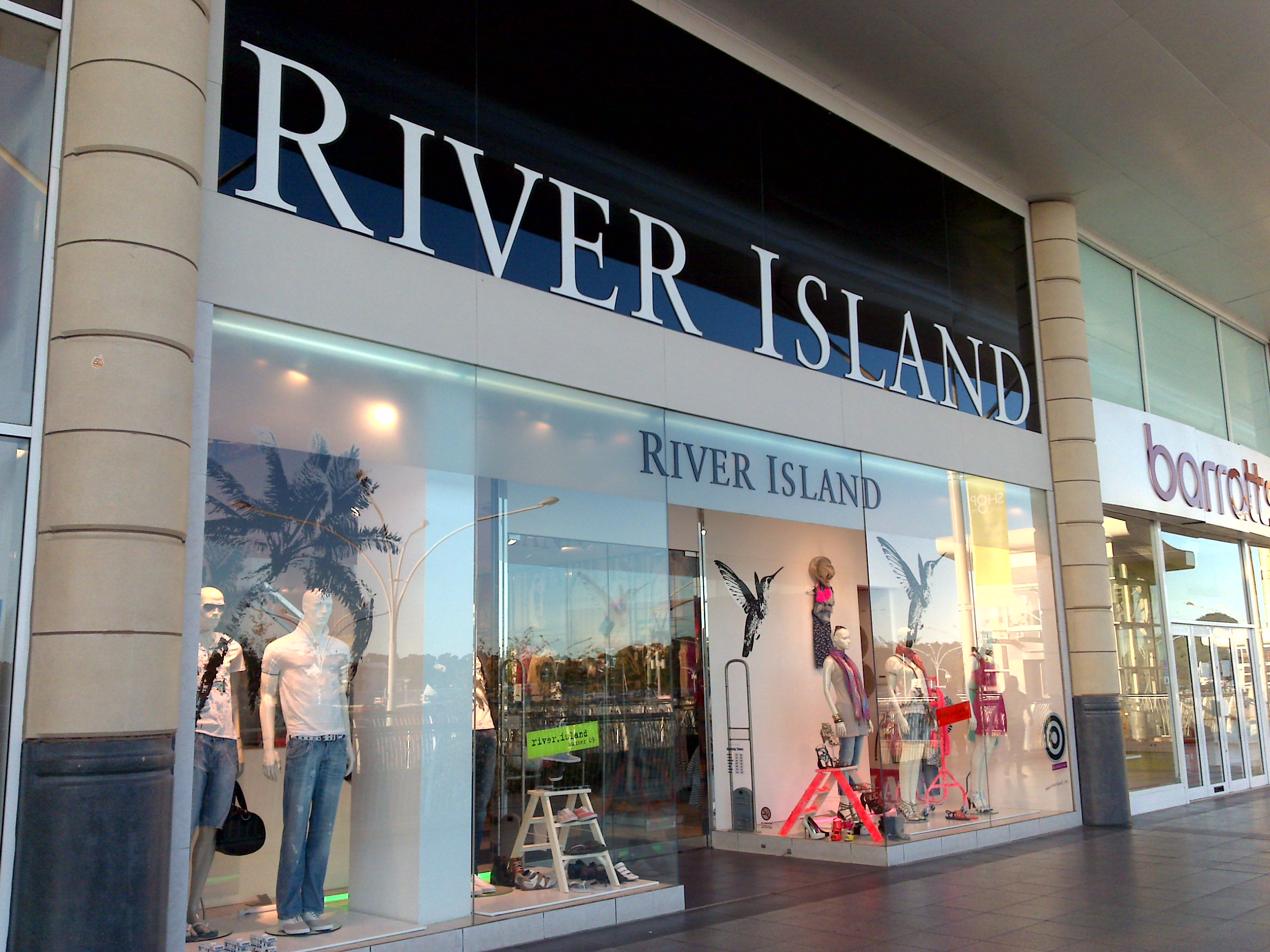
Store front at Castlepoint Shopping Centre.

=== Origins ===
In 1948, Bernard Lewis started selling fruit and vegetables, from a market stall situated in an old bomb site in Notting Hill. Soon after, a second site, named The Wool Shop, opened, selling knitting wool and a small amount of ladies clothing.

Responding to the post-war demand for women's clothing, Lewis shifted the business focus to clothing and began designing and making clothes in-house. The company sold its first own made design in 1950, a white, lace trimmed blouse with capped sleeve. Joined by his three brothers, the chain expanded to nine stores under the title Lewis Separates.

=== Chelsea Girl and the 1960s ===
Led by the Lewis family, the business was an influential name in the 1960s fashion scene. By 1965 Lewis Separates had a 70 store empire in the UK and it was decided that the brand needed a new identity. Lewis Separates was re-branded to Chelsea Girl, named after the brand's store on King's Road in Chelsea, at the time a hub of fashion, music and popular culture.

Chelsea Girl was a key driver of the iconic mini dress trend. According to Bernard Lewis, the business pivoted production to focus on mini dresses in response to strong sales, and between spring and autumn 1965, mini dresses grew from 5-6% of sales to 50%.

The Chelsea Girl name was revived in 2011, with a capsule collection in UK stores focusing on retro styles. In 2022, Chelsea Girl was refreshed again, focusing on a younger consumer and pitched as being for the "new generation of Chelsea girls".

=== Expansion and introduction of River Island ===
In the 1980s, menswear was introduced to the business for the first time by Bernard's son, Leonard Lewis, with the Chelsea Man then Concept Man brand. Concept Man stores were combined with existing Chelsea Girl shops, either in unused first floor spaces or adjacent premises.

In 1988, River Island launched as a menswear store in Exeter, with the name inspired by Leonard Lewis's time spent on a boat on the Thames. The name and store performed so well that the whole business was rebranded from Chelsea Girl to River Island later in 1988.

=== High street success ===
Throughout the 1990s and 2000s, the brand continued to grow with a continued focus on trend-led, in-house designs. It became a leading high street retailer in the UK. It was also one of the first high street retailers to launch online in the late 1990s.

== Present day ==
River Island is headquartered in West London, with all core teams based in this location, including its in-house design team. Including store staff, River Island employs around 8,400 people in the UK, and in 2019, over 200 staff had worked at River Island for over 25 years.

=== River Studios ===
In 2022, River Island introduced a concept store format called River Studios, it revamped the stores along with adding artificial intelligence to them. By 2024, the concept became their main store format but the River Island name is used instead.

River Studios remains as a fashion range under the name River Island Studios.

=== Leadership ===
River Island is privately owned by the Lewis Family through the Lewis Trust Group. Historically the business has been led by family members, including Bernard's sons Clive and Leonard Lewis and nephew Ben Lewis, who led the business for nine years up to 2019. The family remains closely involved in the business, as non-executive directors.

At age 96, Bernard Lewis was also said to still work five days a week at River Island's HQ. He died in February 2026 aged 100.

Will Kernan took over from Ben Lewis as CEO in 2019. Formerly CEO of cycling retailer Wiggle for two years, and CEO of lifestyle retailer The White Company for five years, Kernan also spent 13 years at New Look, becoming chief operating officer in 2010.

Observers praised the appointment as a "considered", "intelligent" choice, with commentary noting Kernan's appointment was likely to place greater focus on growing digital and international operations to help River Island compete with its high street rivals.

In November 2022, it was announced that Kernan would leave his role as CEO in 2023.

=== UK operations ===
River Island sells through 230 stores in the UK as well as online. In 2022, the brand launched a new segmentation strategy with the opening of its store in Swansea's Morfa retail park. According to River Island this strategy specifically curates stores for their local markets.

In the UK, the brand also sells via select wholesale partners Next, Very and Asos.

=== Digital and multichannel operations ===
In recent years, River Island has invested heavily in its multichannel offer, including in technology, supply chain and logistics. In 2018, then CEO Ben Lewis said: “We want to be a leading retailer but we also want to be a leading tech company.” According to accounts available on Companies House, the business has invested heavily in IT, spending £1.5m in 2018 and 2019, adding infrastructure and staff.

In 2008, River Island was an early adopter of content focused retailing, and launched a website featuring blogs, news, trends and style alongside its ecommerce offer. This is now absorbed into the main ecommerce site, which continues to publish editorial content.

=== International ===
In 1993, the brand expanded outside of Great Britain, with its first shop in Ireland, on Dublin's Grafton Street. It later expanded into mainland Europe, opening its Amsterdam shop in 2006.

Today River Island ships to 125 countries globally, and works with international wholesale and franchise partners including Alshaya, Namshi and Zalando. According to Companies House documents, in 2020, around 11% of turnover came from international markets.

In 2021, River Island launched online in the US and Canada, partnering with The Bay in Canada. and Nordstrom in the US. In 2022, select The Bay and Nordstrom stores began stocking River Island.

=== Financials ===
During the Covid-19 pandemic, sales fell dramatically at River Island as lockdown measures forced closures on the entire UK store estate. In its most recent results, covering the 52 weeks to 26 December 2020, turnover fell 31.7% year on year to £600.5m, and the business reported an operating loss of £36.2m, compared with a profit of £21.4m in 2019. CEO Will Kernan has said the business has since "recovered strongly".

== Products ==
River Island is known for its trend led fashion ranges, all of which are designed in the UK at the retailer's head office in London.

In addition to its womenswear and menswear lines, River Island launched maternity in 2009, kidswear in 2010 and baby in 2018. In 2018, River Island briefly launched homeware, which was paused due to the pandemic in 2020.

The River Island ecommerce site has also offered third party brands since 2018, including Birkenstock, Superga and Skechers.

In 2022, River Island also launched a third party beauty offering alongside its own small range of fragrances. Brands on offer include Revolution and Vita Liberata.

== Partnerships ==
=== Celebrity collaborations ===
==== Rihanna for River Island ====
In 2013, pop-star Rihanna co-designed three collections for River Island alongside her personal stylist Adam Selman. The first collection was launched with a show at London Fashion Week in January 2013, with the last launching in November 2013. The range was well received, with many of the lines in each collection selling out.

==== River Island edited by Sofia Richie ====
In June 2022, River Island partnered with Sofia Richie, the model, social media star and daughter of Lionel Richie. The summer capsule collection of styles featured a campaign shot in Richie's native California, and was available in stores and online.

=== Charity partnerships ===
River Island regularly collaborates with charities, recent fundraising collaborations include with the mental health awareness charity Mind and with Fashion Targets Breast Cancer – which featured a range of T-shirts raising funds for the Breast Cancer Now charity. River Island supported youth charity Ditch the Label with a 'Labels are for Clothes' campaign, followed by Pride collections, also to benefit Ditch the Label. Previously the company has also worked with UK Black Pride, Age UK and Place2Be

=== Graduate Fashion Week ===
River Island was a sponsor of Graduate Fashion Week for six years from 2005 to 2011, providing sponsorship and mentoring for undergraduates in creative courses.

=== London Fashion Week and the British Fashion Council ===
River Island has been a patron of the British Fashion Council and London Fashion Week since 2012. The scheme supports and promotes the British fashion industry.

In 2021, the 'Music Meets Fashion' competition was held between River Island, MTV, ICEBERG and the British Fashion Council. The competition asked fashion design students to create a collection fusing music, fashion and sustainability. The winner, Lucy Saunders, showed her collection at London Fashion Week February 2021 with a performance from UK singer Griff.

== CSR and sustainability ==
In 2020 River Island launched a new sustainability strategy, based around 12 commitments aligned to the United Nations Sustainable Development Goals.

Following this, River Island was named as one of the Top 10 Fastest Movers on the Fashion Transparency Index 2020.

=== Newlife Partnership ===
Alongside other charity initiatives, River Island has an ongoing relationship with Newlife, a charity that works to support disabled and terminally ill children. The charity was founded by former River Island MD Leonard Lewis in 1991. River Island donates stock to be recycled and resold, and in 2021, 850,000 garments were reused or recycled through the partnership. It also donates 100% of the UK carrier bag levy money to the charity, which has raised £3m since 2016.

=== Partnerships and pledges ===
River Island is a signatory to several sustainability pledges and partnerships, including the Bangladesh Accord, the Carbon Trust, WRAP and the Sustainable Apparel Coalition.

It also has pledged to use 100% more sustainable cotton by 2023, in partnership with the BCI.

Most recently, River Island announced that it had joined the Microfibre Consortium, Canopy and became a signatory of the Textiles 2030 agreement.
