= International cricket in 1922 =

International cricket season

The 1922 International cricket season was from April 1922 to August 1922. There were no major international tours held during this season.

== Season overview ==
International tours
Start date	Home team	Away team	Results [Matches]			
Start date	Home team	Away team	Test	ODI	FC	LA
7 June 1922	Marylebone	Scotland	—	—	0–1 [1]	
13 July 1922	Scotland	Ireland	—	—	0–0 [1]	—
7 August 1922	Netherlands	Foresters	—	—	0–2 [3]	—
21 August 1922	Netherlands	Incogniti	—	—	0–2 [3]	—

== June ==
=== Scotland in England ===
Three-day Match
No.	Date	Home captain	Away captain	Venue	Result
Match	7–9 June	Not mentioned	Not mentioned	Lord's, London	Marylebone by an innings and 183 runs

== July ==
=== Ireland in Scotland ===
Three-day Match
No.	Date	Home captain	Away captain	Venue	Result
Match	13–15 July	John Kerr	Bob Lambert	Hamilton Crescent, Glasgow	Match drawn

== August ==
=== Foresters in Netherlands ===
Two-day Match Series
No.	Date	Home captain	Away captain	Venue	Result
Match 1	7–8 August	Not mentioned	Not mentioned	The Hague	Match drawn
Match 2	9–10 August	Not mentioned	Not mentioned	Zomerland, Bilthoven	Free Foresters by an innings and 65 runs
Match 2	11–12 August	Not mentioned	Not mentioned	Amsterdam	Free Foresters by 6 wickets

=== Incogniti in Netherlands ===
Two-day Match Series
No.	Date	Home captain	Away captain	Venue	Result
Match 1	21–22 August	Not mentioned	Not mentioned	Haarlem	Incogniti by 185 runs
Match 2	23–24 August	Not mentioned	Not mentioned	The Hague	Match drawn
Match 3	25–26 August	Not mentioned	Not mentioned	Amsterdam	Incogniti by an innings and 67 runs
