= Gordon Lambert =

Irish businessman, senator, art collector, sportsman (1919–2005)

Senator
- In office 27 October 1977 – 8 October 1981
- Constituency: Nominated by the Taoiseach

Personal details
- Born: Charles Gordon Lambert; 9 April 1919 Dublin, Ireland
- Died: 27 January 2005 (aged 85) Dublin, Ireland
- Party: Independent
- Parent: Bob Lambert (father)
- Relatives: Ham Lambert (brother); Sep Lambert (uncle)
- Education: Trinity College Dublin

Charles Gordon Lambert (9 April 1919 – 27 January 2005) was an Irish businessman, senator, and art collector.

He spent almost all of his working life with the Irish biscuit makers, W. & R. Jacob & Co. Ltd., and is credited with the company's very successful marketing in the 1960s and 1970s, notably its long-running sponsorship of the Jacob's Awards.

He was the youngest of the four sons of Bob Lambert and his wife Nora (née Mitchell) of Rathgar. He was educated at Sandford Park School, Dublin, and Rossall School, Lancashire. Later, he studied commerce at Trinity College Dublin. He qualified as a chartered accountant, working with Stokes Brothers and Pim, before joining Jacobs in 1944.

In 1977, he was appointed to Seanad Éireann by the Taoiseach Jack Lynch.

Lambert played field hockey for Three Rock Rovers, and won trophies in badminton and golf.

In 1988, he met with Taoiseach Charles Haughey and "told him if the State would establish a gallery he would donate his collection." In 1992, he donated over 300 paintings to the Irish Museum of Modern Art (IMMA). Lambert had earlier campaigned for an Irish national modern art collection to be established and had been a prominent figure in the Irish art scene. He sat on IMMA's board from 1991, and the west wing of the museum was named after him in 1999. Lambert commissioned five portraits of himself: by Robert Ballagh (1972), Clifford Rainey (1975), Adrian Hall (1979), Pat Harris (1980) and Brian Maguire (1982); they are kept at IMMA.

An archive containing papers relating to Lambert are among the Special Collections of National Irish Visual Arts Library. IMMA also has an archive of letters, cards, photographs, printed material and ephemera.
