= Store Street =

Street in central Dublin, Ireland

Coordinates: 53°20′59″N 6°15′8″W

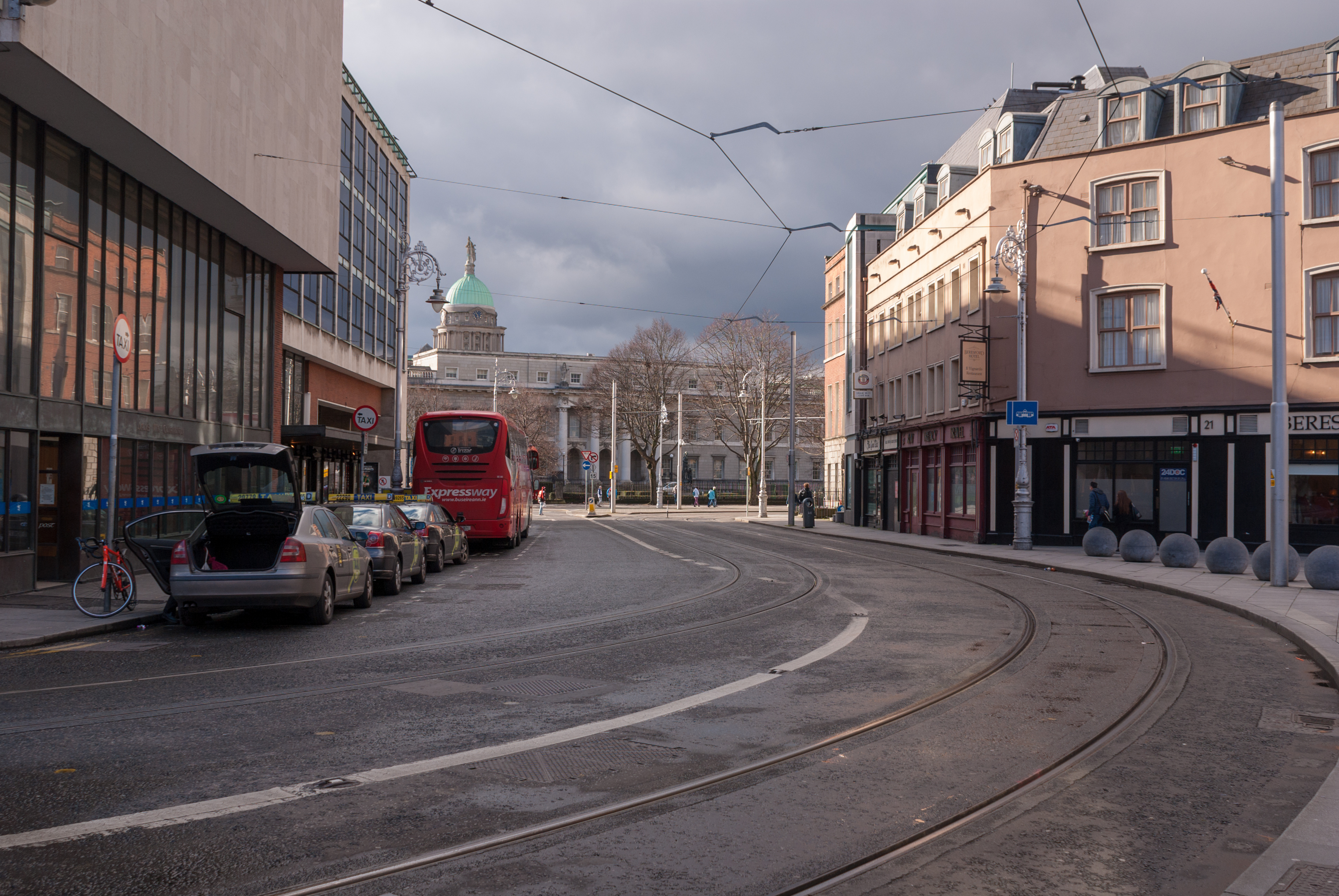
- Store Street looking south onto Custom House

- Location within Central Dublin
- Native name: Sráid an Stórais (Irish)
- Namesake: Stores of the adjacent Custom House Docks complex
- Length: 170 m (560 ft)
- Width: 21 metres (69 ft)
- Postal code: D01
- south end: Beresford Place
- east end: Amiens Street
- North: James Joyce Street

Other
- Known for: Garda station, Busáras

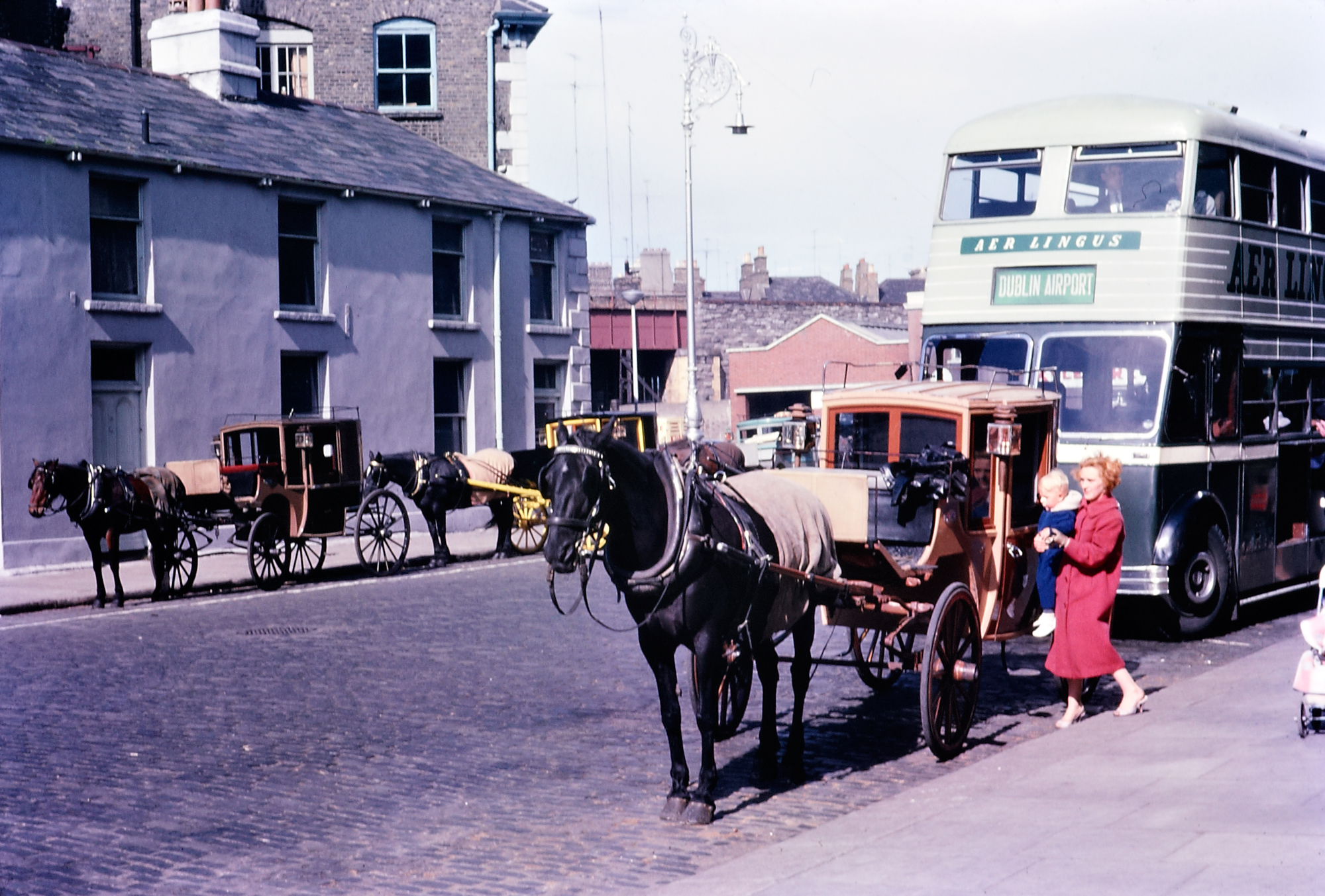
Airport Bus on Store Street in 1961

Store Street (Irish: Sráid an Stórais) is a short street in Dublin, Ireland, running from Amiens Street at right angles to Beresford Place.

== History ==
The street derived its name from the many stores and warehouses that dominated the area due to the proximity to the Custom House Docks complex from the 1790s onwards. It appears as a thoroughfare on maps in 1800. The stores were demolished in the 1940s and the dock near the street to the east of the Custom House, known as the Old Dock (originally Custom House Dock), was filled in. The crescent of houses on Beresford Place, designed by James Gandon, terminates on Store Street. Number 1 in this small crescent, known as Gandon House, also faces onto Store Street.

In the late 1800s the prominent English veterinary surgeon, Thomas Drummond Lambert, had a large practice based on Store Street the footprint of which was impacted by the construction of the Loop Line railway bridge by the Dublin, Wicklow and Wexford Railway Company in the late 1880s. The elevated train line still runs above the street, with a single-span iron railway viaduct. The stables used by Lambert were possibly those which were known as Queen's Mews Court, which was an area off Store Street as it met Mabbot Street (now called James Joyce Street). Store Street may also have been referred to as an extension of Mabbot Street before the construction of the stores in the 1790s. These stables served the Custom House and the site is now occupied by an extension to the Store Street Garda Station.

The Mews was the subject of a painting by Harry Kernoff from circa 1940.

Attacks and antisocial behaviour have risen in recent years on Store Street and the surrounding area.

== Architecture ==
Buildings of note on the street include the Garda Station, Dublin City Coroner's Court, and Busáras. A police station has existed on the street since the existence of the Dublin Metropolitan Police as the C division police station. This station shared a site with the city morgue. The street also featured a bakery for much of the 19th and early 20th centuries. During the construction of the Luas tram line along the street a large paved area, known as the Store Street Plaza, was created outside of the Garda station. The plaza was completed in 2007 and features the sculpture "Scathan" by Robert McColgan. This divided the street, cutting off vehicular access to the portion of the street which meets Talbot Street and James Joyce Street at the northern end. A number of 19th century buildings have survived on the street, including one public house on the corner of Store Street and Frenchman's Lane dating from 1890.

== Transportation links ==
The street has tramlines with the Luas running to Busáras and running at right angles towards Abbey Street, Dublin.

== See also ==
- George's Dock, Dublin
