= International cricket in 1923 =

International cricket season

The 1923 International cricket season was from April 1923 to August 1923.

== Season overview ==
International tours
Start date	Home team	Away team	Results [Matches]			
Start date	Home team	Away team	Test	ODI	FC	LA
26 May 1923	England	West Indies	—	—	1–0 [2]	—
21 June 1923	Ireland	Scotland	—	—	0–0 [1]	—
21 July 1923	Scotland	Wales	—	—	0–1 [1]	—
6 August 1923	Netherlands	Foresters	—	—	0–3 [3]	—
18 August 1923	England	England Rest	—	—	1–0 [1]	—

== May ==
=== West Indies in England ===
First-class series
No.	Date	Home captain	Away captain	Venue	Result
Match 1	26–29 May	TO Jameson	Karl Nunes	Lord's, London	Match drawn
Match 2	3–5 September	Leveson Gower	Harold Austin	North Marine Road Ground, Scarborough	HDG Leveson-Gower's XI by 4 wickets

== June ==
=== Scotland in Ireland ===
Three-day Match
No.	Date	Home captain	Away captain	Venue	Result
Match	21–23 June	John Crawfurd	John Kerr	College Park, Dublin	Match drawn

== July ==
=== Scotland in Wales ===
Two-day Match
No.	Date	Home captain	Away captain	Venue	Result
Match	21–23 August	Not mentioned	Not mentioned	North Inch, Perth	Wales by an innings and 111 runs

== August ==
=== Foresters in Netherlands ===
Two-day Match Series
No.	Date	Home captain	Away captain	Venue	Result
Match 1	6–7 August	Not mentioned	Not mentioned	The Hague	Free Foresters by an innings and 29 runs
Match 2	8–9 August	Not mentioned	Not mentioned	Zomerland, Bilthoven	Free Foresters by 144 runs
Match 2	10–11 August	Not mentioned	Not mentioned	Hilversum	Free Foresters by an innings and 123 runs

=== Test trial in England ===
Three-day match
No.	Date	Home captain	Away captain	Venue	Result
Match	18–21 August	Frank Mann	Arthur Carr	Lord's, London	England by 5 wickets
