= International cricket in 1925 =

International cricket season

The 1925 International cricket season was from April 1925 to September 1925.

== Season overview ==
International tours
Start date	Home team	Away team	Results [Matches]			
Start date	Home team	Away team	Test	ODI	FC	LA
3 June 1925	Marylebone	Wales	—	—	0–0 [1]	—
11 July 1925	Ireland	Scotland	—	—	1–0 [1]	—
3 August 1925	Netherlands	Foresters	—	—	1–2 [3]	—
15 August 1925	Wales	Ireland	—	—	1–0 [1]	—
27 August 1925	Netherlands	Dragonflies	—	—	1–0 [3]	—
2 September 1925	Netherlands	Marylebone	—	—	0–1 [1]	—

== June ==
=== Wales in England ===
Two-day Match
No.	Date	Home captain	Away captain	Venue	Result
Match	3–5 June	Not mentioned	Not mentioned	Lord's, London	Match drawn

== July ==
=== Scotland in Ireland ===
Three-day Match
No.	Date	Home captain	Away captain	Venue	Result
Match	11–14 July	Bob Lambert	GLD Hole	College Park, Dublin	Ireland by 179 runs

== August ==
=== Foresters in Netherlands ===
Two-day match series
No.	Date	Home captain	Away captain	Venue	Result
Match 1	3–4 August	Not mentioned	Not mentioned	Haarlem	Free Foresters by 7 wickets
Match 2	5–6 August	Not mentioned	Not mentioned	Amsterdam	Free Foresters by 75 runs
Match 3	7–8 August	Dé Kessler	Not mentioned	Zomerland, Bilthoven	Flamingos by 10 wickets

=== Ireland in Wales ===
Two-day Match
No.	Date	Home captain	Away captain	Venue	Result
Match	15–17 August	Not mentioned	Bob Lambert	Llandudno Cricket Club Ground	Wales by an innings and 36 runs

=== Dragonflies in Netherlands ===
Two-day match series
No.	Date	Home captain	Away captain	Venue	Result
Match 1	27–28 August	Not mentioned	Not mentioned	Rijswijk	Match drawn
Match 2	29–30 August	Not mentioned	Not mentioned	The Hague	HCC by 40 runs
Match 3	31 Aug–1 September	Not mentioned	Not mentioned	The Hague	Match drawn

== September ==
=== MCC in Netherlands ===
Two-day match
No.	Date	Home captain	Away captain	Venue	Result
Match	2–3 September	Not mentioned	Not mentioned	The Hague	Marylebone by 7 wickets
