= International cricket in 1921 =

International cricket season

The 1921 International cricket season was from April 1921 to August 1921.

== Season overview ==
International tours
Start date	Home team	Away team	Results [Matches]			
Start date	Home team	Away team	Test	ODI	FC	LA
28 May 1921	England	Australia	0–3 [5]	—	—	—
4 August 1921	Ireland	Scotland	—	—	0–0 [1]	—
15 August 1921	Netherlands	Foresters	—	—	0–3 [3]	—

== May ==
=== Australia in England ===
The Ashes Test series
No.	Date	Home captain	Away captain	Venue	Result
Test 140	28–30 May	Johnny Douglas	Warwick Armstrong	Trent Bridge, Nottingham	Australia by 10 wickets
Test 141	11–14 June	Johnny Douglas	Warwick Armstrong	Lord's, London	Australia by 8 wickets
Test 142	2–5 July	Lionel Tennyson	Warwick Armstrong	Headingley Cricket Ground, Leeds	Australia by 219 runs
Test 143	23–26 July	Johnny Douglas	Warwick Armstrong	Old Trafford Cricket Ground, Manchester	Match drawn
Test 144	13–16 August	Johnny Douglas	Warwick Armstrong	Kennington Oval, London	Match drawn

== August ==
=== Scotland in Ireland ===
Three-day Match
No.	Date	Home captain	Away captain	Venue	Result
Match	4–6 August	Bob Lambert	John Kerr	Rathmines, Dublin	Match drawn

=== Foresters in Netherlands ===
Two-day Match Series
No.	Date	Home captain	Away captain	Venue	Result
Match 1	15–16 August	Not mentioned	Not mentioned	Haarlem	Free Foresters by an innings and 162 runs
Match 2	17–18 August	Not mentioned	Not mentioned	De Diepput, The Hague	Free Foresters by 6 wickets
Match 3	19–20 August	Not mentioned	Not mentioned	Zomerland, Bilthoven	Free Foresters by an innings and 120 runs
