= International cricket in 1920 =

International cricket season

The 1920 International cricket season was from April 1920 to August 1920. The season consists with English domestic season.

== Season overview ==
International tours
Start date	Home team	Away team	Results [Matches]			
Start date	Home team	Away team	Test	ODI	FC	LA
22 July 1920	Scotland	Ireland	—	—	1–0 [1]	—

== July ==
=== Ireland in Scotland ===
Three-day Match
No.	Date	Home captain	Away captain	Venue	Result
Match	22–24 July	George Chalmers	Bob Lambert	Raeburn Place, Edinburgh	Scotland by 9 wickets
