= International cricket in 1924 =

International cricket season

The 1924 International cricket season was from April 1924 to August 1924.

== Season overview ==
International tours
Start date	Home team	Away team	Results [Matches]			
Start date	Home team	Away team	Test	ODI	FC	LA
28 May 1924	England	England Rest	—	—	1–0 [1]	—
14 June 1924	England	South Africa	3–0 [5]	—	—	—
19 July 1924	Scotland	Ireland	—	—	0–0 [1]	—
4 August 1924	Netherlands	Shropshire	—	—	0–2 [3]	—
6 August 1924	Netherlands	Foresters	—	—	0–0 [2]	—
23 August 1924	Wales	Scotland	—	—	1–0 [1]	—

== May ==
=== Test trial in England ===
Three-day match
No.	Date	Home captain	Away captain	Venue	Result
Match	28–30 May	Not mentioned	Not mentioned	Trent Bridge, Nottingham	England by 3 wickets

== June ==
=== South Africa in England ===
Test series
No.	Date	Home captain	Away captain	Venue	Result
Test 153	14–17 June	Arthur Gilligan	Herbie Taylor	Edgbaston Cricket Ground, Birmingham	England by an innings and 18 runs
Test 154	28 Jun–1 July	Arthur Gilligan	Herbie Taylor	Lord's, London	England by an innings and 18 runs
Test 155	12–15 July	Arthur Gilligan	Herbie Taylor	Headingley Cricket Ground, Leeds	England by 9 wickets
Test 156	26–29 July	Johnny Douglas	Herbie Taylor	Old Trafford Cricket Ground, Manchester	Match drawn
Test 157	16–19 August	Arthur Gilligan	Herbie Taylor	Kennington Oval, London	Match drawn

== July ==
=== Ireland in Scotland ===
Three-day Match
No.	Date	Home captain	Away captain	Venue	Result
Match	19–22 July	Not mentioned	Not mentioned	Forthill, Dundee	Match drawn

== August ==
=== Shropshire in Netherlands ===
Two-day Match Series
No.	Date	Home captain	Away captain	Venue	Result
Match 1	4–5 August	Not mentioned	Alex Lees	Haarlem	Gentlemen of Shropshire by 108 runs
Match 2	6–7 August	Not mentioned	Alex Lees	Rijswijk	Match drawn
Match 3	8–9 August	Not mentioned	Alex Lees	Rotterdam	Gentlemen of Shropshire by and innings and 4 runs

=== Foresters in Netherlands ===
Two-day Match Series
No.	Date	Home captain	Away captain	Venue	Result
Match 1	6–7 August	Not mentioned	Alex Lees	Rijswijk	Match drawn
Match 2	8–9 August	Not mentioned	Not mentioned	Zomerland, Bilthoven	Not mentioned

=== Scotland in Wales ===
Two-day Match
No.	Date	Home captain	Away captain	Venue	Result
Match	23–26 August	Not mentioned	Not mentioned	St Helen's, Swansea	Wales by an innings and 79 runs
