= North Strand Road =

Street in Dublin, Ireland

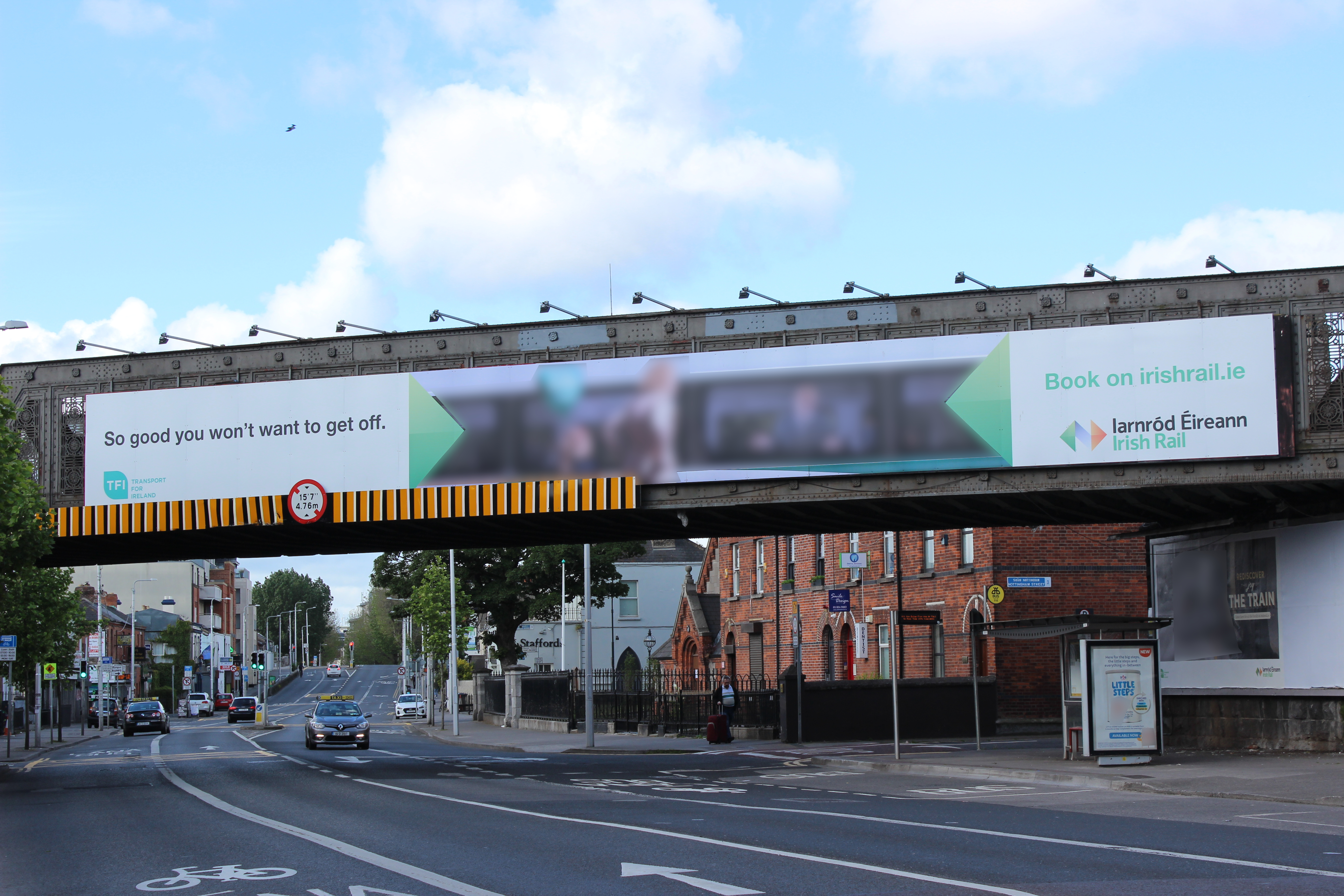

- Location within Central Dublin
- Native name: Bóthar na Trá Thuaidh (Irish)
- Former name: The Strand
- Namesake: It formerly along the North Strand of Dublin Bay and the mouth of the River Liffey
- Length: 800 m (2,600 ft)
- Width: 29 metres (95 ft)
- Location: Dublin, Ireland
- Postal code: D03
- Coordinates: 53.358525°N 6.241297°W
- north end: Annesley Bridge Road, Poplar Row, East Wall Road
- south end: Seville Place, Portland Row, Amiens Street

North Strand Road (Irish: Bóthar na Trá Thuaidh) is a street in the Northside of Dublin, Ireland. It is part of the North Strand area. It links the city centre from Connolly Station to Fairview by road.

== Route ==
North Strand Road is a continuation of Amiens Street, which runs northeast from the junction of Portland Row and Seville Place. It crosses the Royal Canal on the Newcomen Bridge, and proceeds to the junction of East Wall Road and Poplar Row via the Annesley Bridge over the River Tolka; at this point it continues as Annesley Bridge Road.

== History ==
As late as 1673, what is now North Strand Road was under the waters of the River Liffey mouth in Dublin Bay. In 1728 and in John Rocque's map of 1756, the road was noted on maps as "the Strand".

As part of a wider set of proposals to rename a number of Dublin streets in 1921, it was proposed that North Strand be renamed Bohernatra (Strand Road) along with Amiens Street, in a report by the Dublin Corporation street naming committee. This new naming scheme was not implemented, despite the Corporation voting in favour.

=== World War II bombing ===
On the night of 31 May 1941, aircraft of the German Luftwaffe dropped four high-explosive bombs on the North Strand Road area, killing 34 and injuring 90. Three hundred houses were damaged or destroyed.

It was not clear if this was a reprisal for the aid of the Dublin Fire Brigade during bombing raids on Belfast or if it had been a tactic to end Irish neutrality.

On 19 June, the Irish government announced that the government of the Nazi Germany had apologised and offered compensation.

Speculation over the reason for the raid has included the possibility that it was the unintended consequence of equipment used to jam radio navigation used by the bombers.

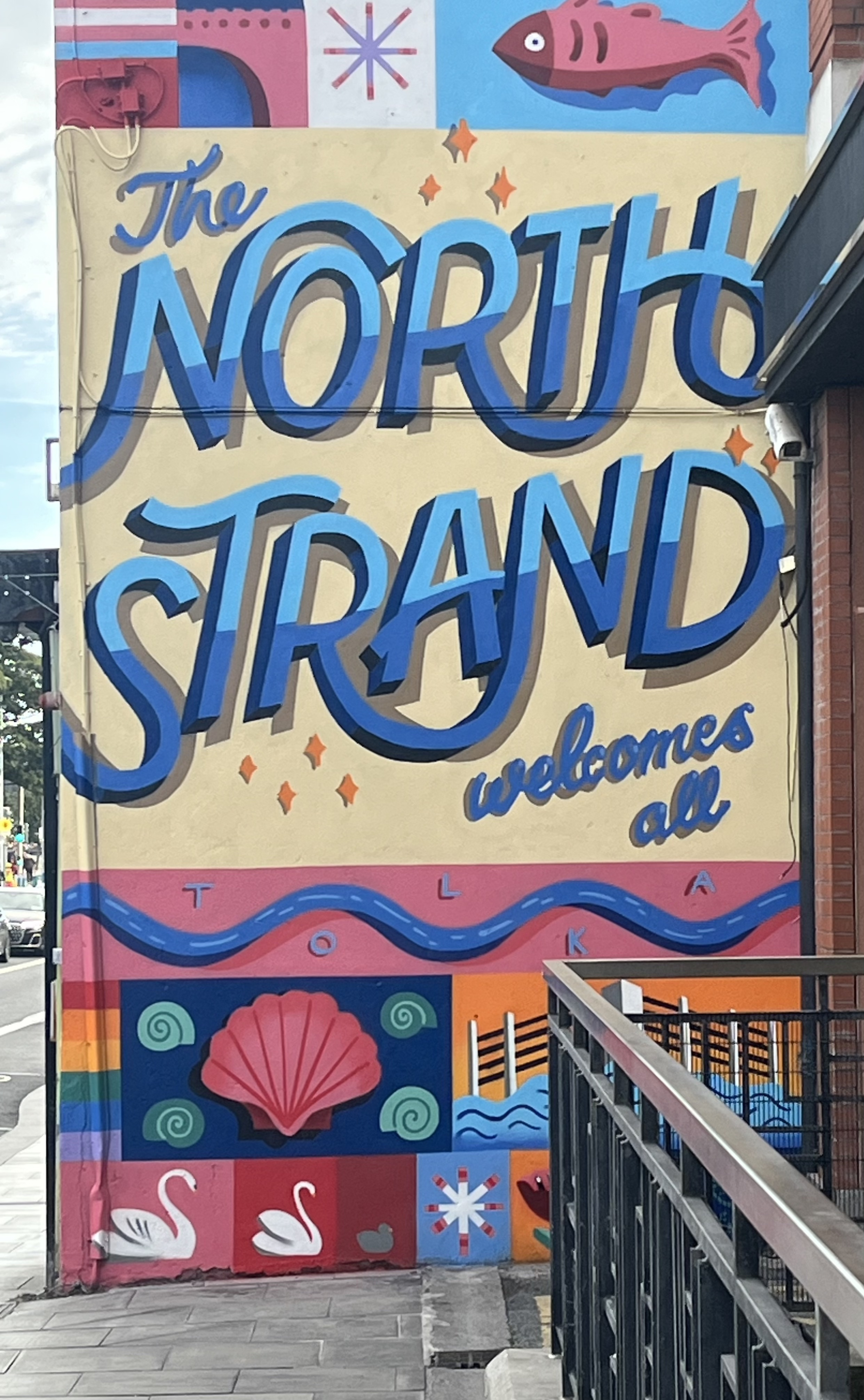
A mural on the North Strand Road

== See also ==
- List of streets and squares in Dublin
- Bombing of Dublin in World War II
- Battle of the Beams
