= Universal Links on Human Rights =

Coordinates: 53.349194°N 6.251711°W

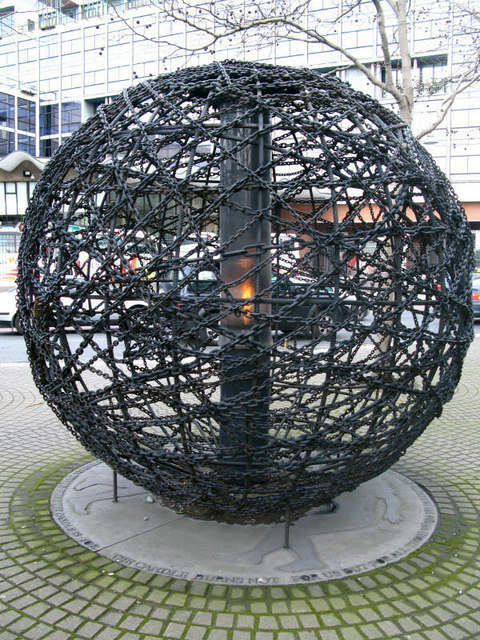
- Artist: Tony O'Malley
- Medium: Sculpture
- Location: Dublin, Ireland

Universal Links on Human Rights is a memorial sculpture located in Dublin, Ireland, on the traffic island at the junction of Amiens Street, Beresford Place, and Memorial Road, close to Busáras and The Customs House. It is a sphere of welded interlinked chains and bars, 260 cm in diameter, housing an eternal flame in its center, powered by natural gas. It was commissioned by Amnesty International in 1995 and designed by Tony O'Malley (born 1962). It represents the jails holding prisoners of conscience.
