= George's Dock, Dublin =

Georgian canal dock in Dublin, Ireland

Coordinates: 53.3496°N 6.2476°W

George's Dock
- Duga Sheoirse (Irish)
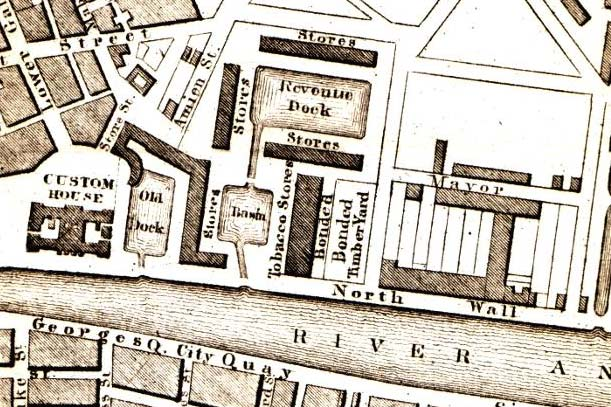
- Map of the original dock area in 1840

- Location within Central Dublin
- Location: Dublin

History
- Built: 1821

Site notes
- Architect(s): John Rennie the Elder; John Rennie the Younger

George's Dock (Irish: Duga Sheoirse) is a Georgian dock in the Docklands area of Dublin forming part of the International Financial Services Centre.

== History ==
Located near the Custom House, the dock was originally built in 1821 as a working maritime dock and was named for George IV of the United Kingdom. The Inner Dock (previously Revenue Dock), was constructed a few years later in 1824 following the death of John Rennie the Elder and was completed by his son, John Rennie the Younger.

Along with the old Custom House Dock, designed by James Gandon in 1796, the three docks and the various warehouses formed what was later known as the Custom House Docks. The Old Dock was infilled in 1927 with many of the store buildings and the swing bridge across the inlet removed to make way for an extension of Amiens Street and Beresford Place through to Custom House Quay, thus creating a new stretch of road now known as Memorial Road. It would later link to Talbot Memorial Bridge in 1978.

As with other public spaces within the Docklands, George's Dock was redeveloped during the 1980s and 1990s with elements of the Custom House Harbour apartment complex being constructed on a new island within the Inner Dock.

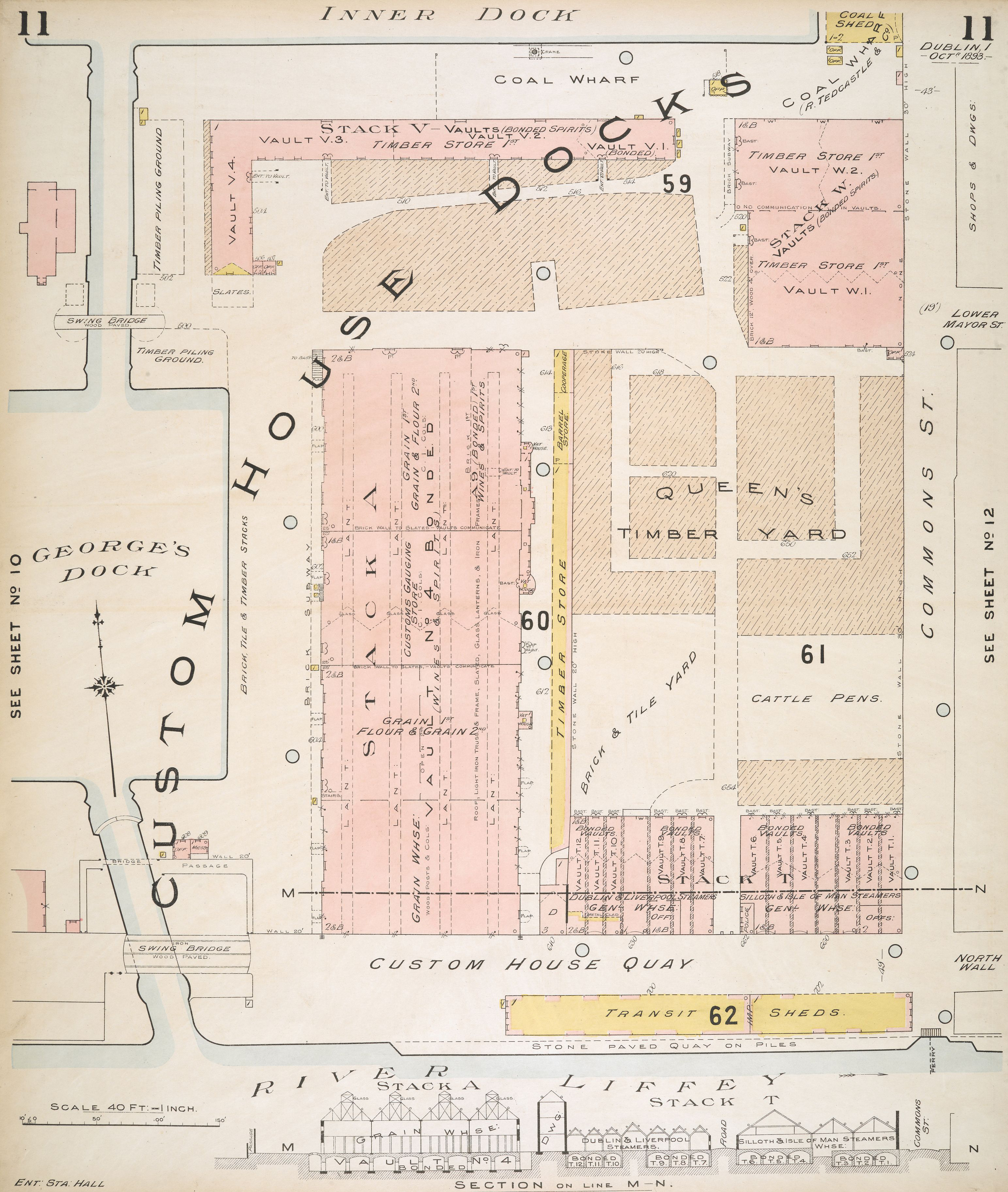
Insurance Plan of the City of Dublin from 1893 showing George's Dock and parts of the Inner Dock

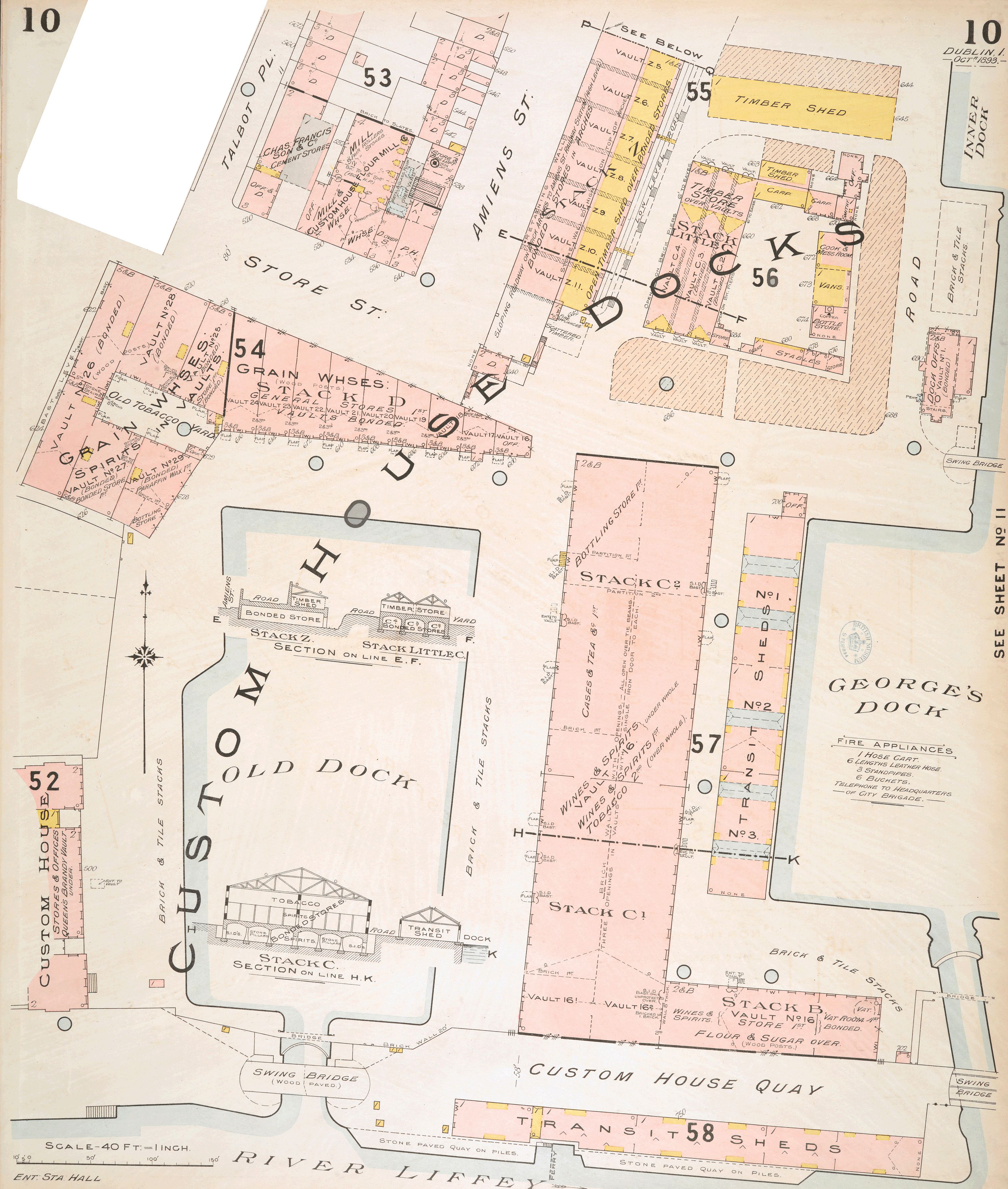
Insurance Plan of the City of Dublin from 1893 showing the Old Dock and parts of George's Dock

In 2016, the dock was transferred to Dublin City Council ownership from the disbanded Dublin Docklands Development Authority.

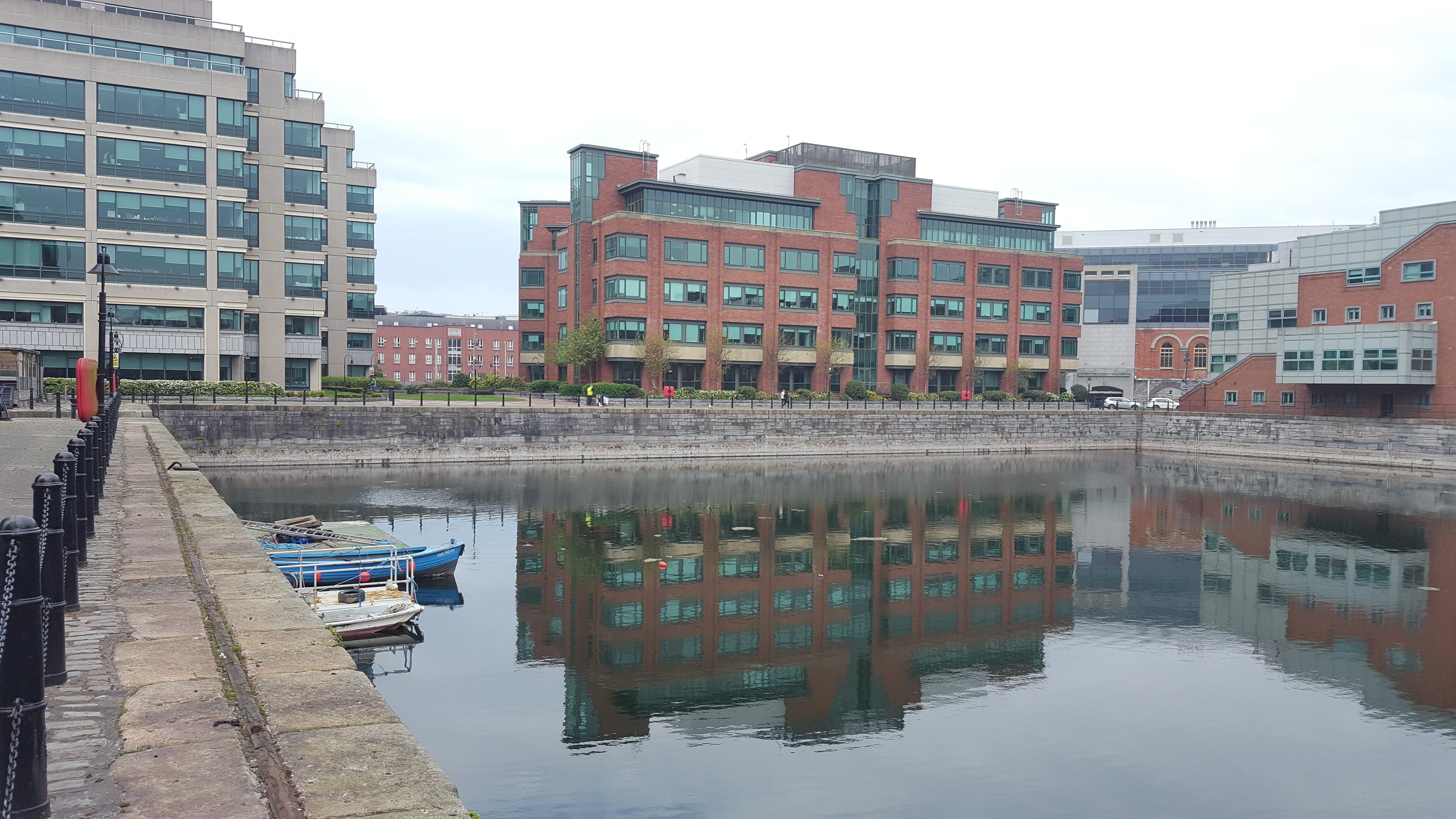
The Inner Dock in 2019

George's Dock has been used by Dublin City Council as an event space including for the annual Dublin Oktoberfest festival and the showing of sporting and live music events.

In 2021, controversial plans to convert the dock into a white water rafting facility were postponed after a Dublin City Council vote.

== Transport hub ==
From a transport perspective, the George's Dock Luas stop is served by the Luas Red Line which runs from Tallaght to Connolly and from Busáras to Point Village (3Arena). Dublin Bus serves nearby North Wall Quay and East Wall Road with routes 33d, 33x, 53a, 74, 74a, 90, 142, 151 and the 747 Airlink service to Dublin Airport. The Red Line extension opened on 9 December 2009.

The George's Dock Luas bridge was damaged by fire in August 2025, and Transdev stated that they planned to rebuild it by the "end of November" 2025. It duly reopened on 28 November 2025.

== See also ==
- CHQ Building
