= Beresford Place =

Street in Dublin, Ireland

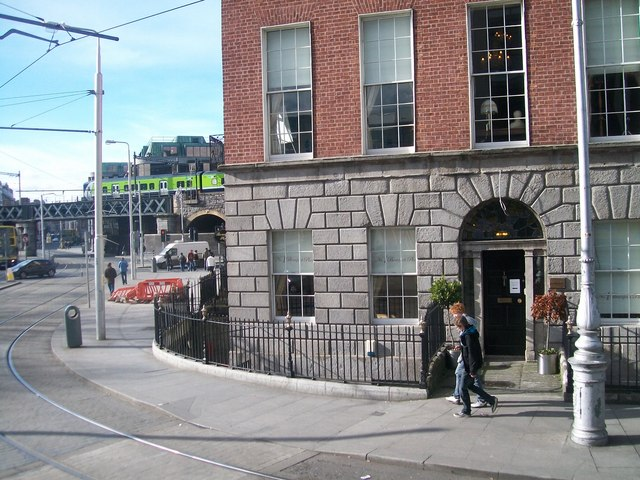
- The corner of Store Street and Beresford Place

- Location within Central Dublin
- Native name: Plás Beresford (Irish)
- Namesake: John Claudius Beresford
- Location: Dublin, Ireland
- Postal code: D01
- Coordinates: 53.3493385°N 6.2561061°W
- west end: Gardiner Street
- east end: Amiens Street, Memorial Road

Construction
- Commissioned: 1790

Other
- Designer: James Gandon
- Known for: Georgian architecture

Beresford Place (Irish: Plás Beresford) is a crescent-shaped street in Dublin, Ireland, originally laid out as a crescent surrounding the Custom House in 1792 to the plan of James Gandon.

== History ==
Beresford Place was developed in 1792 as a continuous crescent which was aligned to the axis of the central dome of the Custom House. Along with the Custom House and the old Custom House Dock, the houses at 1-5 were also originally designed by James Gandon. Gandon may also have directly designed at least a further 4 houses at numbers 9–12 in a similar manner which also formed part of the crescent but have now also been either demolished.

Store buildings facing onto the crescent which formed part of the docks were also built in a crescent shape and with the same materials and height of the Georgian houses. These stores later gave Store Street its name.

The main crescent of five houses was developed specifically for John Claudius Beresford.

At that time it was located at the edge of the city, with Marlborough Bowling Green and Pleasure Gardens and Tyrone House to the north and Mabbot Street to the south. Later a corresponding crescent was intended to be developed by Luke Gardiner at the other end of Gardiner Street near the Mater Hospital however these plans never reached the construction stage owing to the economic downturn following the Acts of Union.

Later, a schoolhouse associated with nearby Trinity Church was constructed at number 6-8 Beresford Place in 1858 to a design of Frederick Darley who had also designed the church in 1838.

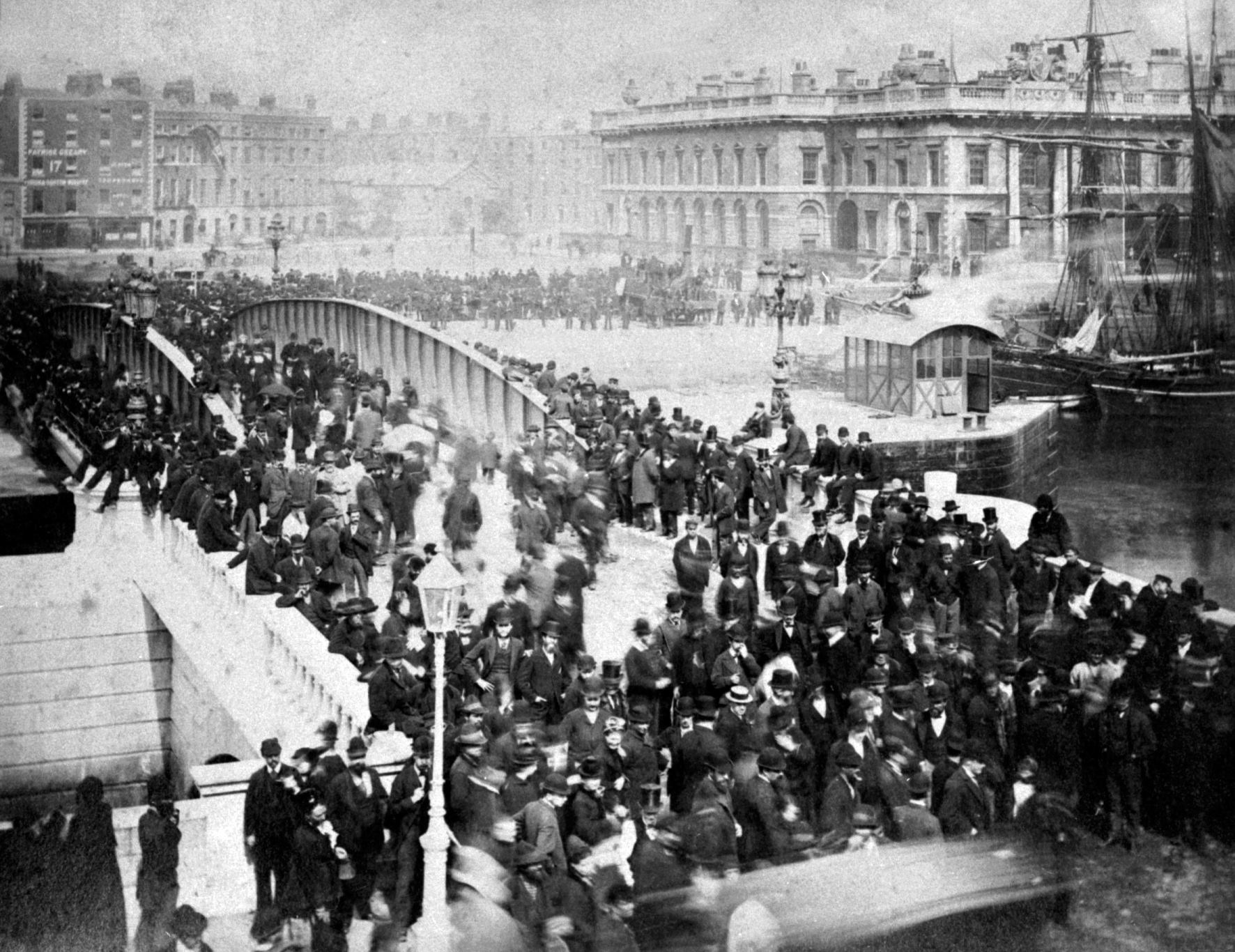
Opening of Beresford swing bridge (1879)

The crescent was bisected in 1888–1889 by the construction of the Loop Line railway which resulted in the demolition of at least one house at numbers 9–12 as well as the school.

Later it was further impacted by the destruction of some buildings during the Irish War of Independence (1919–21) and in the 1970s by the development of the new headquarters of Irish Life at the Irish Life Centre.

The site now occupied by Busáras was originally a further terraced crescent of storehouses which were part of the Custom House Docks and gave Store Street its name.

The five extant Gandon houses are 4 storeys over basements, built with red brick with rusticated granite ground floors. The end houses are both on an irregular trapezoidal plan, and are entered from Gardiner Street and Store Street respectively. They are among very few specifically unified formal terraces from the 18th century and the only surviving example.

There were tentative plans to demolish and redevelop the site in the 1960s, with a design by Michael Scott.

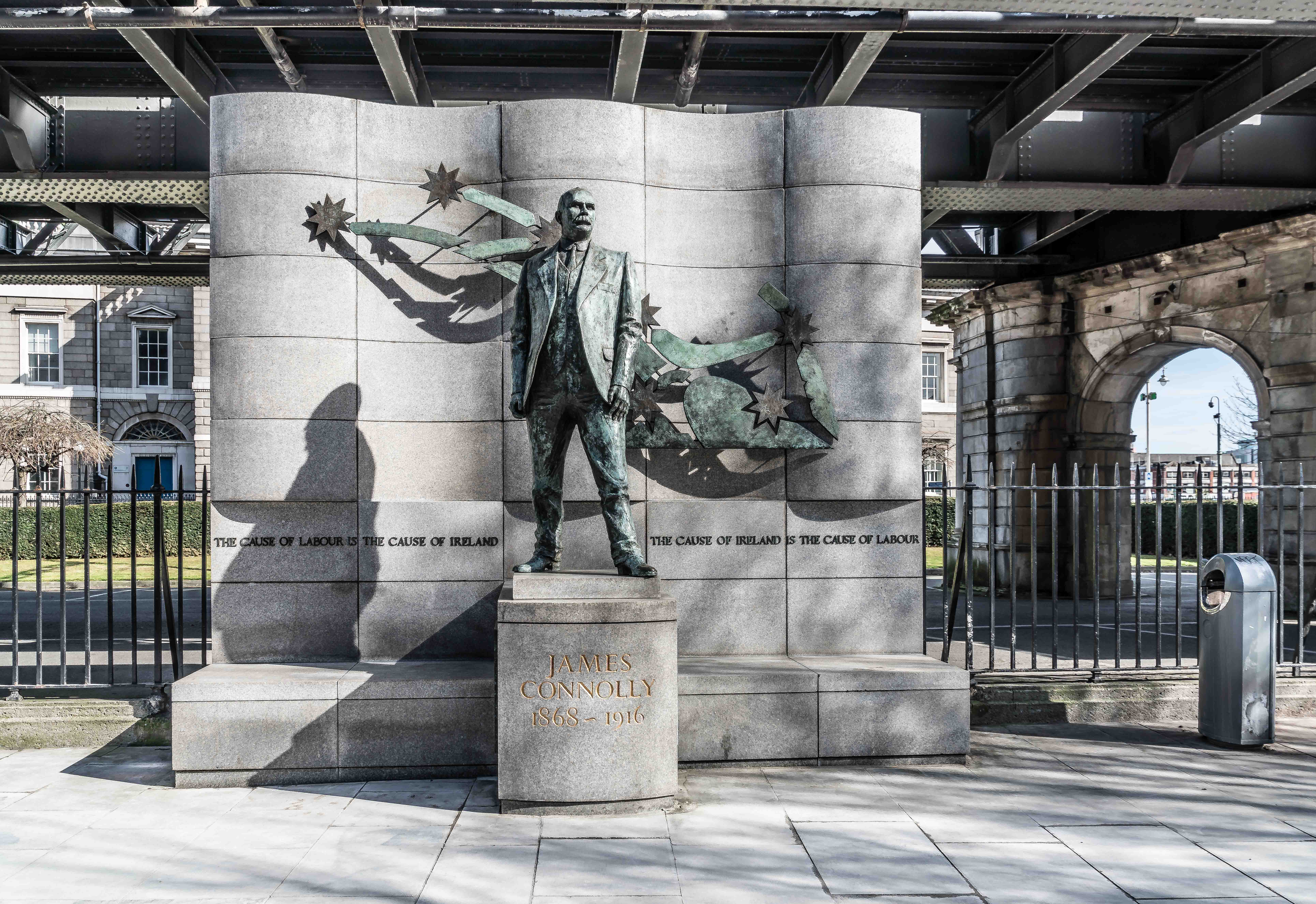
Connolly statue

In 1996 a statue of James Connolly by Éamonn O'Doherty was erected on the street just west of the Custom House, facing onto Liberty Hall. At the other end of the street, at the junction of Beresford Place, Amiens Street, and Memorial Road is the sculpture Universal Links on Human Rights by Tony O'Malley, erected in 1995.

== See also ==
- List of streets and squares in Dublin
