= Thomas Drummond Lambert =

English veterinary surgeon (1837–1911)

- Born: 1837; Old Trafford, England
- Died: 25 May 1911 (aged 73–74); Rathmines, Dublin, Ireland

Thomas Drummond Lambert (1837 – 25 May 1911) was an English veterinary surgeon.

== Early life and family ==
Thomas Drummond Lambert was born in 1837 in Old Trafford, England. His father, Septimus Lambert, was a cattle dealer. Lambert was educated at Manchester Grammar School. He studied to be a veterinary surgeon at the Edinburgh Veterinary College, graduating in 1859. Two of his brothers also studied veterinary, with his brother James becoming a colonel in the British Army and president of the Royal College of Veterinary Surgeons from 1891 to 1892.

In 1871, he married Kate Barrett. They had four sons, Thomas, Robert, William, and Septimus. They initially lived at 11 Duggan Place, Rathmines, but later moved to Mount Anthony, Rathmines. He died at his home on 25 May 1911, and is buried in Mount Jerome Cemetery. Two of his sons became veterinary surgeons, Thomas and Robert, with William becoming an engineer. Both Robert and Septimus played cricket for Ireland.

== Career ==
Lambert worked for a time in Manchester, Liverpool and London, before moving to Dublin in 1862 to take up a position as assistant to J. J. Farrell, Wicklow Street. In 1866, he established his own practice on Dawson Street, with an infirmary for horses on South Anne Street. In response to a cattle plague in Britain, the Irish administration sent Lambert to England to study the disease in January 1866, and report back on how to prevent it spreading to Ireland. He later diagnosed the disease in cattle in Ireland, which was disputed by the Irish farming community. The Irish government decided to cull herds to stop the spread of the disease, which proved successful in containing it.

Lambert treated a variety of animals, but specialised in horses, becoming Ireland's foremost authority on equine veterinary for all types of horses from draught to race horses. He was the veterinary surgeon of the Guinness brewery from 1898. In 1870, he moved to larger premises on William Street, and then to an 8-acre site on Store Street in 1879. At Store Street, the practice had a surgery, a forge, an infirmary for ill horses, an indoor riding school, stables, and apartments for his employees. Despite putting up a legal battle, Lambert eventually lost a portion of the property to the Dublin, Wicklow and Wexford Railway Company in the late 1880s. He opened a new branch of the business at 47 South Richmond Street in 1892.

He was a member of the veterinary colleges in London and Edinburgh, and was elected fellow of the Royal College of Veterinary Surgeons in 1867. He served as president of the Veterinary Medical Association of Ireland for 8 years. From 1869 to 1910, Lambert was the veterinary surgeon at the Royal Dublin Society's horse show, as well as sometimes serving as a referee. In 1875, he was appointed honorary veterinary surgeon to the Royal Agricultural Society. In 1870, he was appointed to the board of examiners of the council of the Royal College of Veterinary Surgeons, and served as vice-president in 1884. He was an official at the Islington horse show, having been appointed by the Royal Commission on Horse Breeding. When the Royal Veterinary College of Ireland was established in 1900, Lambert served on the inaugural board.

Lambert was the veterinary surgeon for a number of lords lieutenant of Ireland, and was present at the royal stud of horses at the Viceregal Lodge in 1900 when Queen Victoria visited Dublin. Following this, he was appointed by royal warrant veterinary surgeon to the queen in Ireland. The appointment was renewed under Edward VII in 1901 and George V in 1910. During Edward's visit to Ireland in 1903, his Irish terrier Jack died suddenly, prompting suspicions that he had been poisoned. Lambert conducted a post-mortem on the dog, and concluded he had died from overfeeding. Edward awarded Lambert a diamond scarf-pin inscribed "E.R. VII" in thanks.

In his equine practice, he avoided cruel treatments such as "firing" lame horses with hot irons, and experimented in developing alternative treatments. In 1889, he developed Reducine, a tar and iodine preparation. With help from his brother James, the preparation was patented in the United States and was very successful. From 1908, it was sold in Ireland and proved popular. Lambert owned and bred horses, including racehorses. His best racehorse was Artane, a steeplechaser. In the early 1890s, he saved the life of the stallion Gallinule, owned by Henry Greer. He also played cricket and was a member of the Leinster Cricket Club. He semi-retired in 1898, and divided his veterinary practice between his sons, Thomas and Robert.
