= Portland Row, Dublin =

Street in Dublin, Ireland

Portland Row
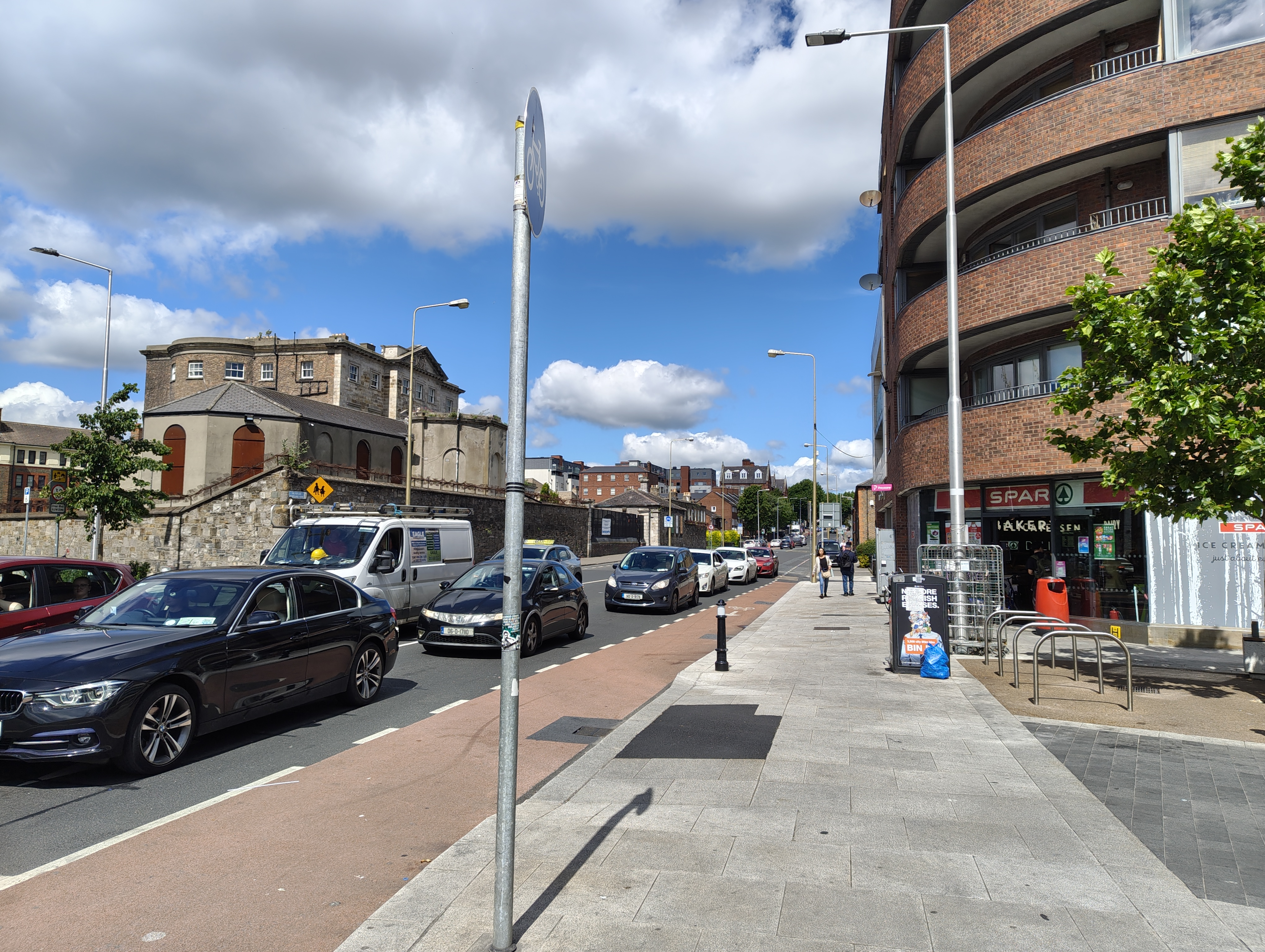
- Portland Row looking towards the North Circular Road from the Five Lamps
- Interactive map of Portland Row
- Native name: Rae Portland (Irish)
- Location: Dublin, Ireland
- Postal code: D01
- Coordinates: 53°21′21″N 6°14′52″W
- north end: North Circular Road
- Major junctions: Summerhill, Amiens Street at the Five Lamps
- south end: Seville Place

Portland Row (Irish: Rae Portland) is a street in Dublin which connects the North Circular Road to the north and Seville Place to the south.

== History ==
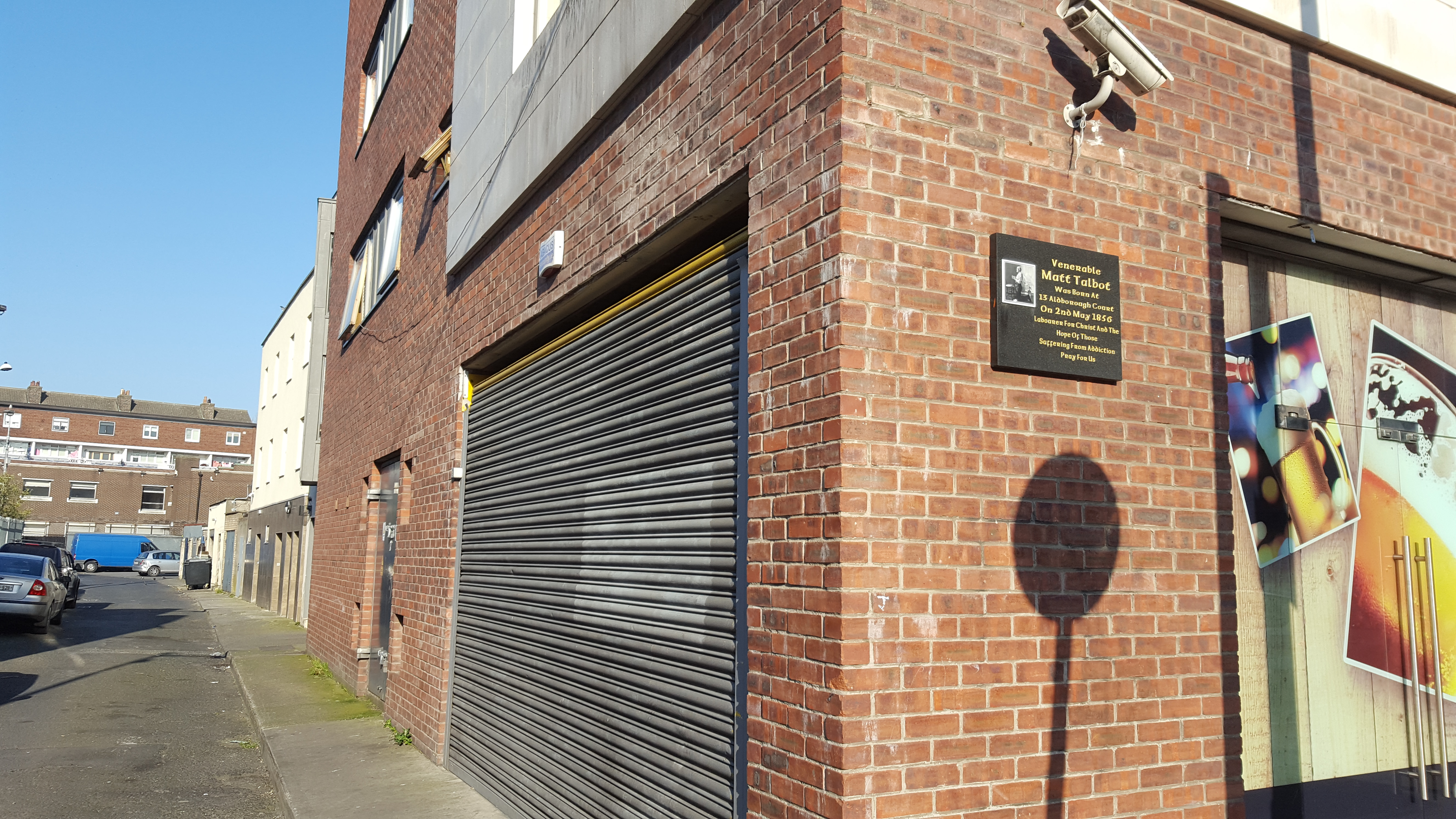
Plaque to Matt Talbot on Portland Row

Portland Row, along with Portland Place and Portland Street, were named for William Cavendish-Bentinck, 3rd Duke of Portland, who served as Lord Lieutenant of Ireland in 1782. The street first appears on maps in 1809.

At the junction of Portland Row and Amiens Street sits the landmark, the Five Lamps, which was erected in memory of General Henry Hall. Another notable landmark on the street is the vacant, Aldborough House, the last Georgian mansion house built in Dublin in 1786. Near to the House and across the street, stand a terrace of five early 19th century houses.

At the northern end of the street, at the junction with Summerhill, sits the former Saint Joseph's Convent. Built in 1909, it is a large red brick Gothic Revival building designed by Ashlin & Coleman. It was redeveloped as apartments in the 21st century. The convent was founded by the Poor Servants of the Mother of God, and from the building they ran a home of poor elderly women known as St Joseph’s Asylum for Aged and Virtuous Females until 1922. Dublin Institute of Technology occupied the building until 2014.

=== Notable residents ===
- Kellie Harrington, Irish Olympic boxer grew up on Portland Row.
- Matt Talbot was born in 13 Aldborough Court, off Portland Row.
