= Ham Lambert =

Irish cricketer and rugby union footballer

Cricket information
- Batting: Right-handed

International information
- National side: Ireland

Career statistics
Competition	First-class
Matches	9
Runs scored	213
Batting average	14.20
100s/50s	0/1
Top score	69*
Catches/stumpings	5/–
- Source: CricketArchive, 6 December 2022

Noel Hamilton "Ham" Lambert (5 June 1910 – 10 October 2006) was an Irish cricketer and rugby union player. By profession a veterinary surgeon, he was noted for being the first in Ireland to own a practice devoted to the care of companion animals.

He is buried in Schull in County Cork, Ireland. The epitaph on his gravestone reads, simply, "A Lovely Man".

== Veterinary career ==
Ham Lambert was born into a family of veterinary surgeons. His grandfather was veterinary surgeon to three reigning monarchs, Queen Victoria, King Edward VII and King George V. His father, Bob Lambert, ran a practice which cared for the draught horses of Dublin from the turn of the 20th century until the early 1930s when working horses became less numerous.

Ham was educated at Sandford Park School in Dublin and at Rossall School in Lancashire, England before entering the Veterinary College in Dublin in 1927. Following graduation he built up an extensive cattle practice, covering a large radius from Sallins to Malahide to Enniskerry, from a base in Richmond St in Dublin. In 1939 he visited America to learn more about the treatment of dogs and cats and in 1952 sold his cattle practice and opened Ireland's first small animal practice at Richmond St. His practice was a model of its kind and hundreds of veterinary students and graduates spent time there learning the art as well as the science of veterinary medicine.

His was the first practice in Ireland to employ qualified veterinary nurses and until the early 1970s it was the only centre in Ireland recognised for the training of nurses by the RCVS.

He was noted throughout the profession for his early adoption of aseptic techniques and for his belief in the value of Vitamin E in the treatment and prevention of circulatory conditions. He frequently prescribed Vitamin E not just to animals in his care but their owners also.

He was the official vet to Dublin Zoo for 25 years and later became its president. Ham retired officially from veterinary practice in 1979 at the age of 69, but was still seeing cases privately at his home well into his nineties.

He was a longtime supporter and fundraiser for Irish Guide Dogs for the Blind, serving on its board for many years.

== Sporting career ==
=== Cricket ===
A right-handed batsman, Lambert played 21 times for the Ireland cricket team between 1931 and 1947, including nine first-class matches.

==== Playing career ====
Lambert made his cricket debut for Ireland against the MCC at Lord's in July 1931, scoring 45 runs. He made his first-class debut the following June, against Scotland. He played against Scotland again the following year, also playing three more times against the MCC between 1933 and 1935 before he began to be a more regular part of the Irish side in 1937.

In 1937, he played against Scotland, Sir Julien Cahn's XI and the MCC before two matches against New Zealand in Dublin in September. Matches against Sir Julien Cahn's XI and Scotland were played in 1938 in addition to two matches against the touring Australian team, before World War II interrupted his career.

After the war, Lambert played against Scotland in 1946, before his career came to an end in 1947. That year he played four matches for Ireland, including matches against Derbyshire and Yorkshire. The match against Derbyshire was his final match for Ireland, and also his final first-class match.

==== Statistics ====
In all matches for Ireland, Lambert scored 577 runs at an average of 18.03, with a top score of 103 against Sir Julien Cahn's XI in August 1938, his only century for Ireland. He never bowled when playing for Ireland.

==== Family ====
Ham Lambert came from a cricketing family. His father Bob also played for Ireland, as did his uncle Sep and his brother Drummond.

=== Rugby union ===
Ham also represented Ireland at rugby union, playing twice in the 1934 against Scotland and Wales before his playing career was ended by a bad knee injury. He later became a rugby union referee, refereeing eleven Five Nations matches between 1948 and 1952. He was regarded as one of the best referees in the post-war era.

Following his retirement he maintained his involvement in rugby, particularly through the Leinster Branch Association of Referees, where for more than 50 years he was both trainer and mentor for generations of referees. He was still attending meetings and assisting with the training of referees well into his nineties. In 2005 he was awarded a special cap for his services as a referee by the IRFU at a ceremony held in Dublin.

=== Other sport ===
In later years he was a keen and competitive golfer, playing regularly at Carrickmines Golf Club and winning the prize for the best front nine at the Lansdowne Rugby Club golf outing in his 90th year. Lambert also played badminton, like his parents, and partnered with Frank Peard in the 1940s when they were both members of Ailesbury Badminton Club.

== See also ==
- List of Irish cricket and rugby union players
