= Sep Lambert =

Cricket information
- Batting: Right-handed

International information
- National side: Ireland

Career statistics
Competition	First-class
Matches	7
Runs scored	184
Batting average	23.00
100s/50s	0/1
Top score	60*
Catches/stumpings	3/0
- Source: CricketArchive, 6 December 2022

Septimus Drummond Lambert (3 August 1876 – 21 April 1959) was an Irish cricketer. A right-handed batsman and wicket-keeper, he played 14 times for the Ireland cricket team between 1896 and 1921, including seven first-class matches.

Lambert was educated at Rathmines School and Wesley College in Dublin and at St John's College in Preston before qualifying as a solicitor in Dublin.

== Cricket career ==
Sep Lambert made his debut for Ireland against I Zingari in August 1896. Never a regular in the Irish side, his international career contains several large gaps between matches, and it was three years before he played his second match for Ireland, also against I Zingari in August 1899. Another three-year gap followed, before he made his first-class debut for Ireland, against London County in May 1902, in what was also Ireland's first first-class match. This was a rare period of consistent selection for Ireland, and he played three further first-class matches again that month, against the MCC, Oxford University and Cambridge University.

He played once in 1903 against London County, and twice in 1904 against South Africa and Cambridge University. He played a match against HDG Leveson-Gower's XI in 1905, before another gap in appearances, this time for eleven years, returning for a match against Scotland in July 1911.

Another long gap followed, though much of this can be explained by Ireland not playing between 1915 and 1919 due to the First World War. He did play three more times for Ireland though, against Scotland in 1920 and against the Irish Military and Scotland in 1921.

=== Statistics ===
In all matches for Ireland, Sep Lambert scored 342 runs at an average of 20.12, with a top score of 60 not out against Oxford University in May 1902, his only half-century for Ireland and also his top first-class score. He took ten catches and no stumpings.

== Family ==
His parents were Kate (née Barrett) and Thomas Drummond Lambert. Sep Lambert came from a cricketing family. His brother Bob was one of Ireland's finest cricketers, and his nephew Ham also played cricket for Ireland.
