= John Crawfurd (cricketer) =

Irish cricketer and rugby union player

Personal information
- Full name: John William Frederick Arthur Crawfurd
- Born: 15 November 1878; London, England
- Died: 22 June 1939 (aged 60); Dublin, Ireland
- Batting: Left-handed
- Bowling: Left-arm fast-medium

International information
- National side: Ireland

Career statistics
Competition	First-class
Matches	19
Runs scored	644
Batting average	23.00
100s/50s	0/4
Top score	72
Balls bowled	759
Wickets	13
Bowling average	31.00
5 wickets in innings	0
10 wickets in match	0
Best bowling	3/30
Catches/stumpings	15/0
- Source: CricketArchive, 16 August 2022

John William Frederick Arthur Crawfurd (15 November 1878 – 22 June 1939) was an Irish cricketer. He was a left-handed batsman and a left-arm fast-medium bowler.

Crawfurd attended Merchant Taylors' School, Northwood, before going up to St John's College, Oxford. He started his first-class cricket career with Oxford University, for whom he played 14 first-class matches in 1900 and 1901. He later played two first-class matches against the university, one for Harlequins and another for an "L Robinson's XI" that featured his fellow Irish international Tim O'Brien. He also represented the university at Rugby Union.

He played four times for Ireland between 1907 and 1923, making his debut against Yorkshire. Three of his matches for Ireland had first-class status.

At his death in 1939, the notice in The Times cites him as being "of Guinness's Brewery, Dublin".
