= Incogniti =

Cricket club

The Incogniti cricket club was founded in 1861. It claims to be the third oldest "wandering" cricket club – a nomadic cricket club without its own home ground – after I Zingari and Free Foresters (founded in 1845 and 1856 respectively). However, this is inaccurate as the Band of Brothers CC of Kent founded in 1858.

The club was founded after a match at Lord's on 25 May 1861, when a scratch team captained by Charles Julius Brune defeated the XYZ Club. It was originally intended that the club would be based at Tufnell Park, but this plan was abandoned and it became a wandering club.

The club's colours are purple, black and gold, and its club motto Incogniti Incognitis (Latin: "unknown only to the unknown") appears on the club's roll of honour on the first landing of the staircase in the pavilion at Lord's.

Members have included Bernard Bosanquet, Reggie Schwarz, Arthur Conan Doyle, Harold Gilligan, Tom Lowry, Douglas Jardine and Oliver Battcock, and more recently David Acfield and Simon Hinks.

The club made tours to North America in 1913, 1920 and 1924, to the Netherlands in 1922, and to Australia in 2010-11.
