= Amiens Street =

Street in Dublin, Ireland

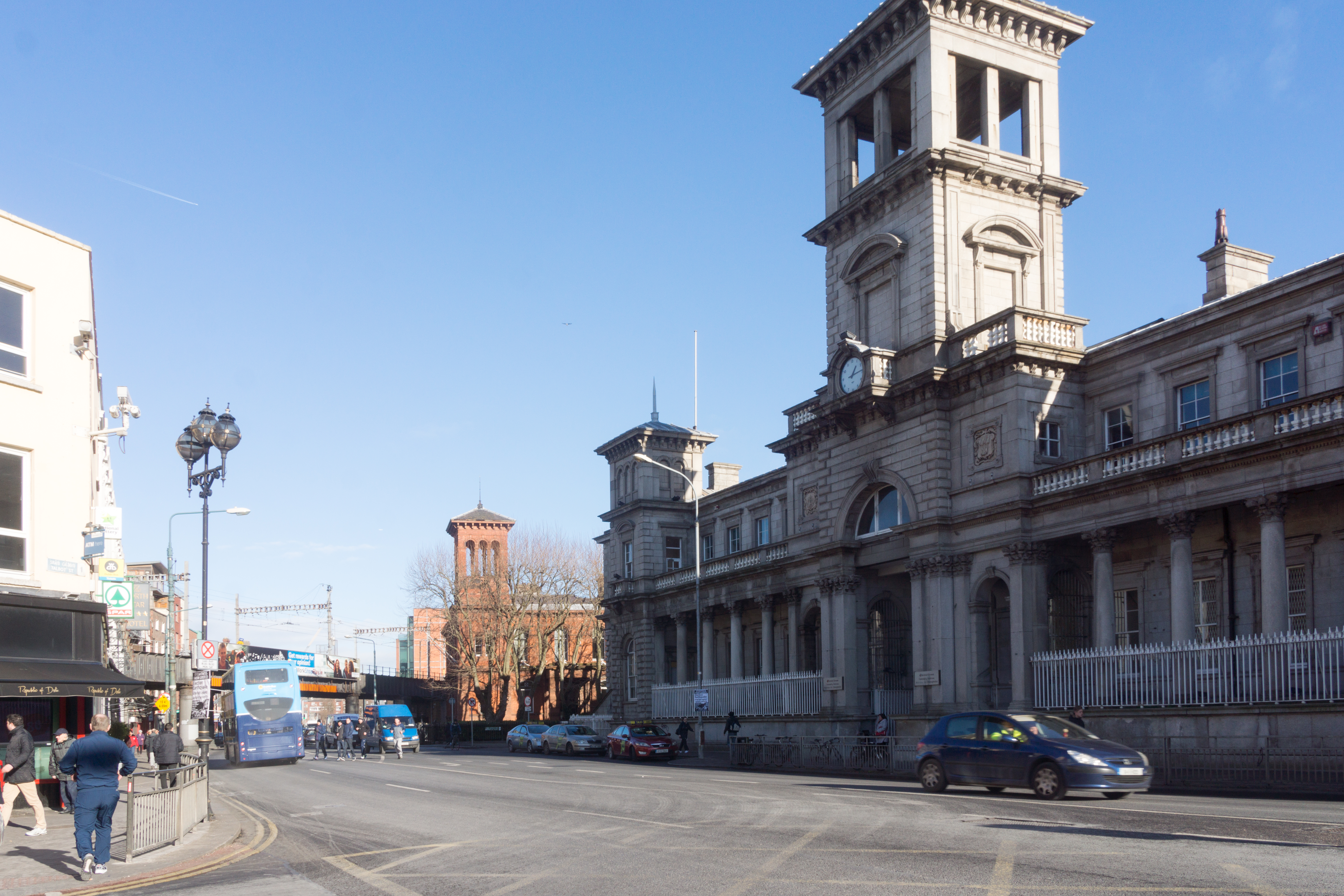
- Amiens Street with the Italianate entrance to Connolly Station. Connolly Station was previously known as Amiens Street Station

- Location within Central Dublin
- Native name: Sráid Amiens (Irish)
- Namesake: John Stratford, 1st Earl of Aldborough and Viscount Amiens
- Length: 750 m (2,460 ft)
- Width: 25 metres (82 ft)
- Postal code: D01
- Coordinates: 53°21′05″N 06°14′59″W
- south end: Custom House
- north end: Portland Row

Other
- Known for: Connolly station, Gandon House

Amiens Street (Irish: Sráid Amiens) is a road in Dublin, Ireland, that runs from Memorial Road to North Strand.

== Location and public transport ==
The street links the International Financial Services Centre and Custom House Quay across the tramlines of the Luas where there is street level tram terminal and interchange for the trains in Connolly Station. Across the road over the pedestrian crossing is Talbot Street. Further up the street with an over bridge carrying the DART (en route to Tara Street across the Liffey) over the street to the junction at the Five Lamps onwards to the North Strand Road heading towards Fairview.

The street underwent redevelopment in the 2020s to accommodate cycle-lanes, with further active travel plans to integrate more cycle-lanes from North Circular Road planned.

== History ==
The road was known as The Strand in the early 18th century. It was renamed after John Stratford, 1st Earl of Aldborough (Viscount Amiens) in 1877, but only to the eastern end. The entire street was named after the Earl in 1829. Previous to this, the eastern end of Gloucester Street (now Seán MacDermott Street) was known as Amiens Street.

As part of a wider set of proposals to rename a number of Dublin streets in 1921, it was proposed that Amiens Street be renamed Bohernatra (Strand Road) along with North Strand, in a report by the Dublin Corporation street naming committee. This new naming scheme was not implemented, despite the Corporation voting in favour.

Aldborough House sits at the junction of Amiens Street at North Strand, and was constructed in 1796 for Viscount Amiens. The house was one of the last significant 18th-century constructions in Dublin, costing £40,000.

It is one of the most frequented streets by railway passengers using Dublin Connolly station, formerly Amiens Street station, which opened in 1844. The Italianate architecture of the Dublin and Drogheda Railway station buildings are the focal point. In 1966, the station was renamed after the General Post Office Commandant James Connolly who was executed for his role in the Easter Rising.

The Loopline Bridge crosses over Amiens Street towards Connolly Station, between the junctions with Talbot Street and Buckingham Street. It was constructed between 1889 and 1891, and was designed by J. Chalconer Smith.

At the junction with North Strand Road, Portland Row and Seville Row, sits the Five Lamps memorial to General Henry Hall erected circa 1880. Built as a public fountain, the lamp motif evokes the area as previously a gateway to the city of Dublin.

The street was one of the boundaries of Dublin's red-light district, Monto, that existed between the 1860s and 1920s.

Talbot Memorial Bridge, completed in 1978, was intended to improve traffic flow by providing a more direct crossing of the River Liffey from Amiens Street. Until the opening of the bridge, one of the worse traffic bottlenecks in Dublin existed at the Custom House.

=== Notable residents ===
- Charles Lever, 19th-century Irish novelist, was born in No. 35.
- Thomas Clarke, Easter Rising leader, ran a tobacconist shop from No. 55 from around 1907 to 1911.

== Gallery ==
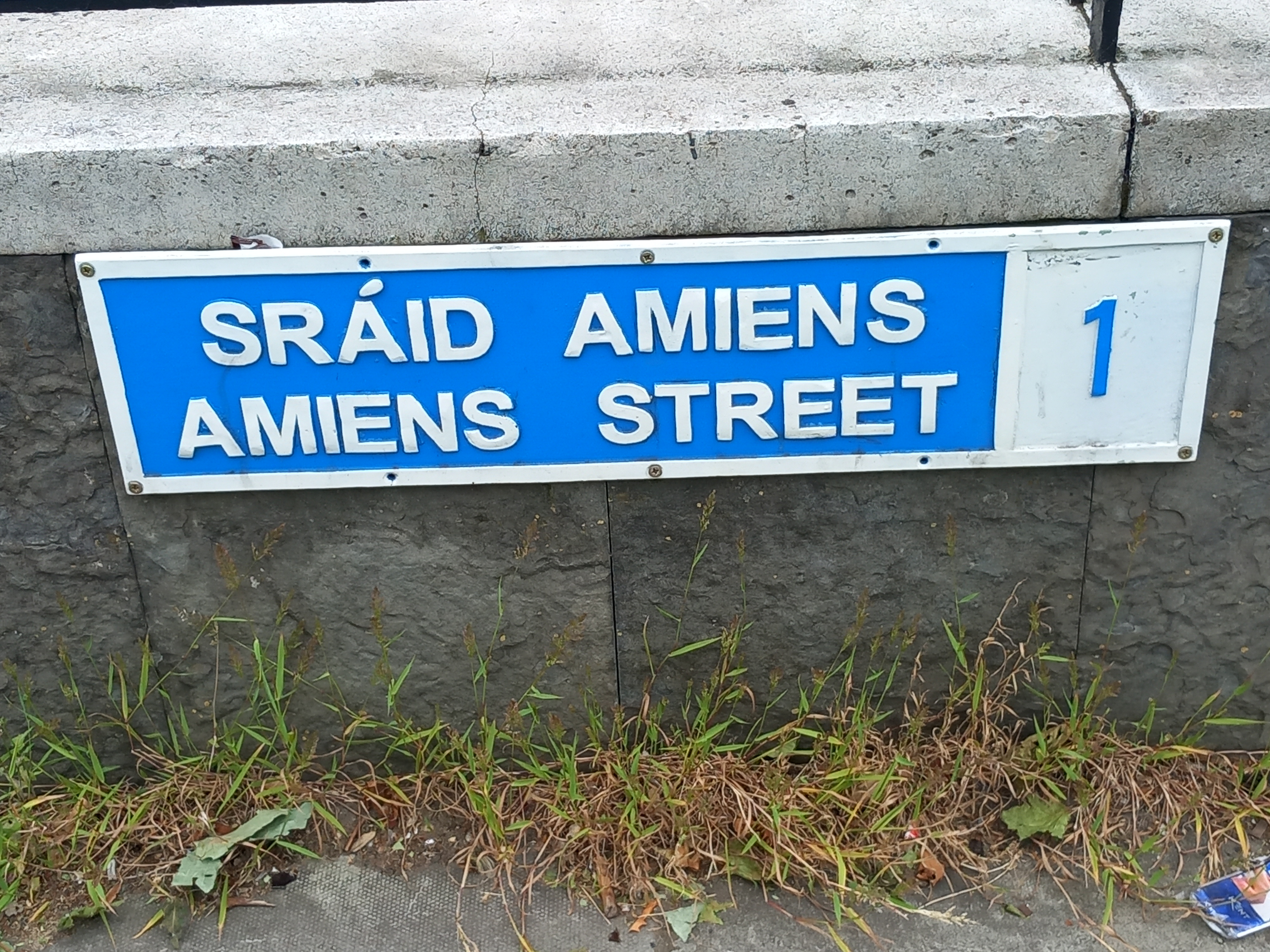
Amiens Street street sign

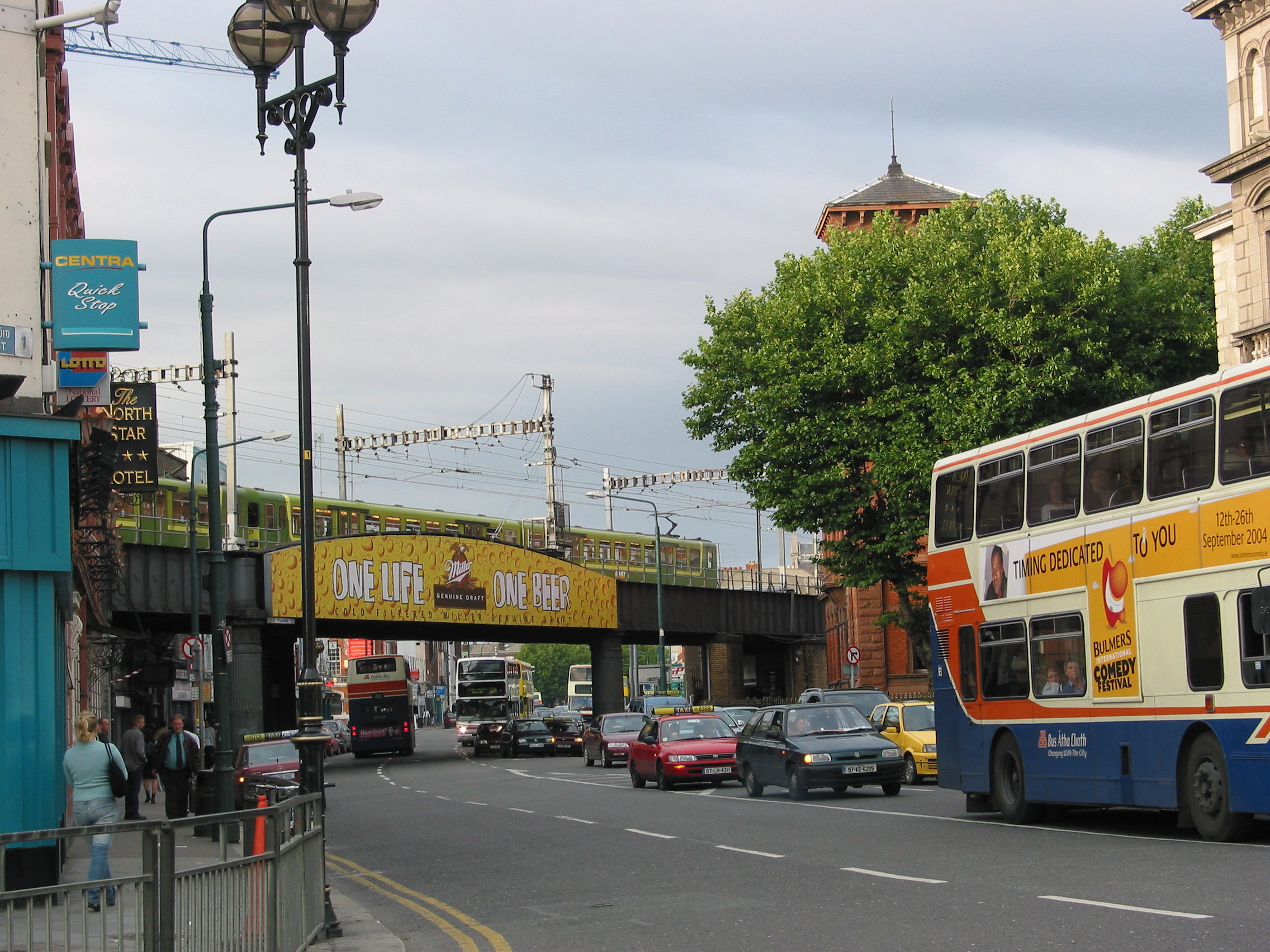
Amiens Street and the Loopline in 2004

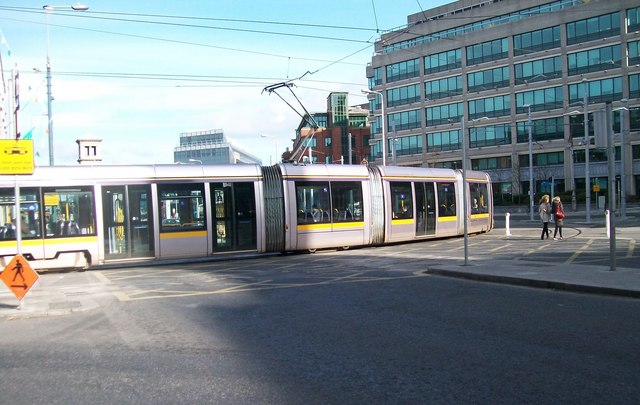
Luas tram crossing Amiens Street into Store Street

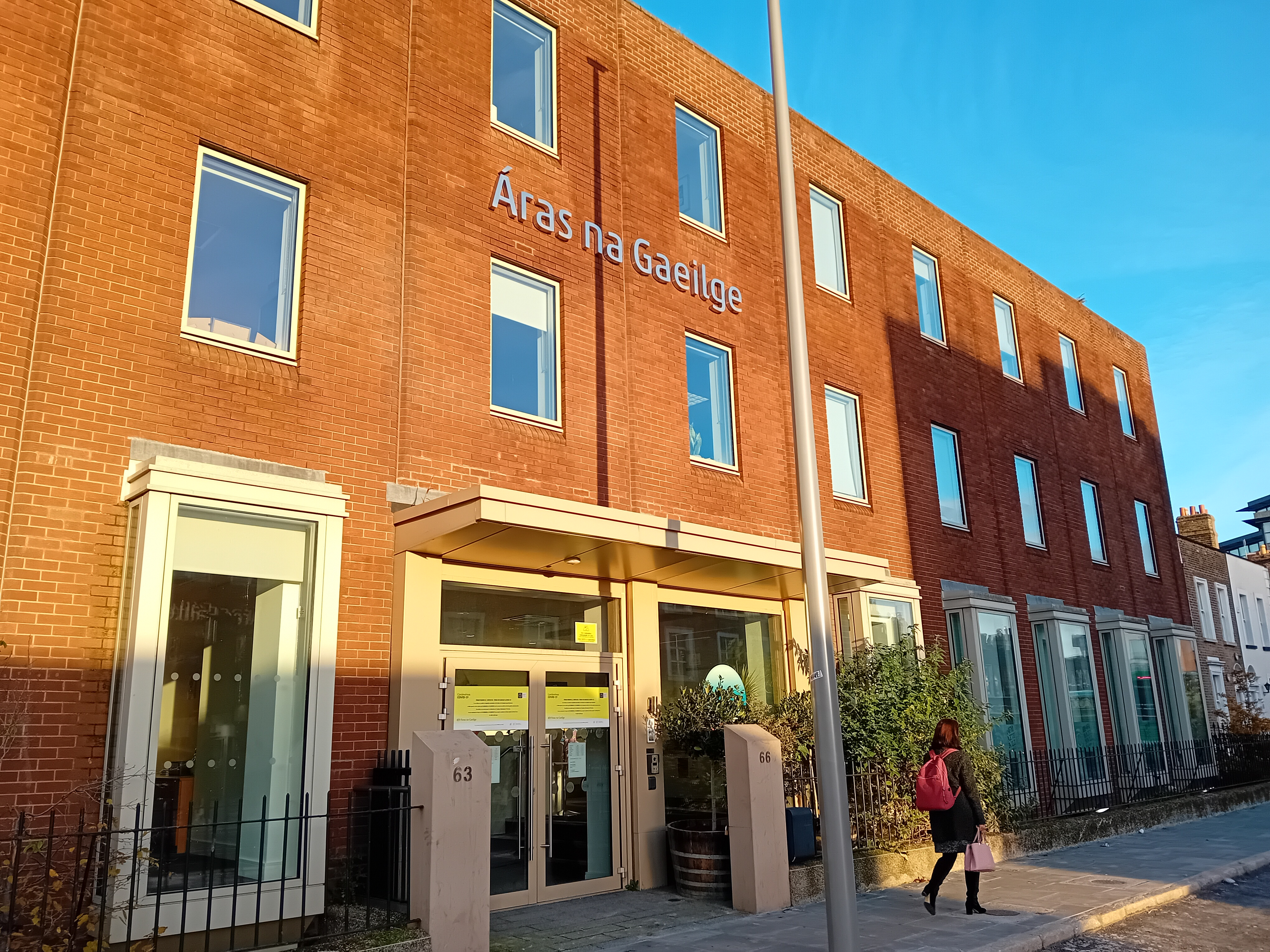
Áras na Gaeilge, Amiens Street

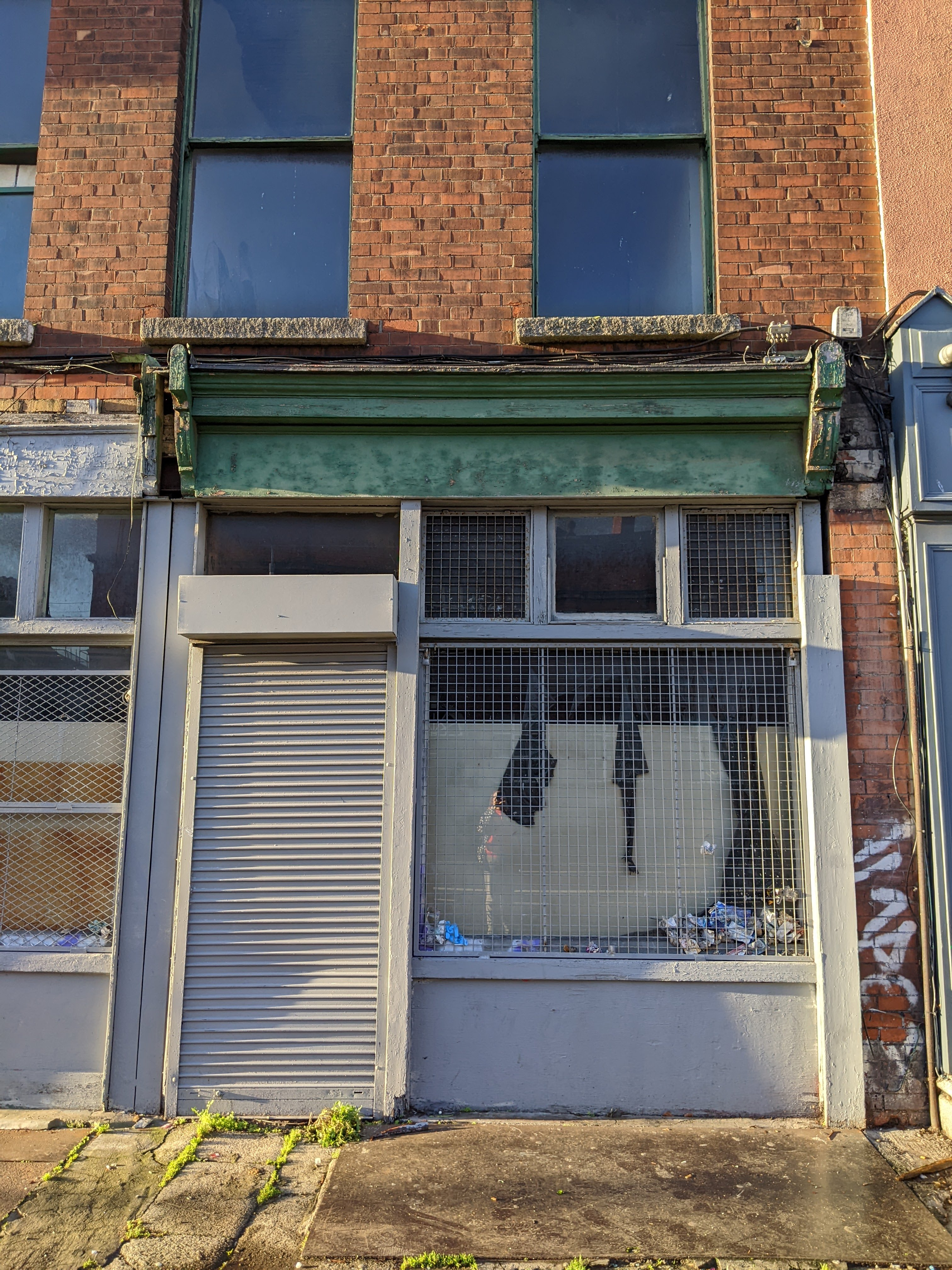
Thomas Clarke's former shop at No. 55

== See also ==
- List of streets and squares in Dublin
