= Bob Lambert (cricketer) =

Irish cricketer

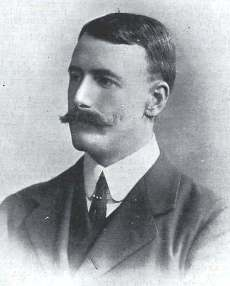

Cricket information
- Batting: Right-handed
- Bowling: Right-arm off-break

International information
- National side: Ireland

Career statistics
Competition	First-class
Matches	25
Runs scored	1,121
Batting average	28.74
100s/50s	1/6
Top score	103*
Balls bowled	3,895
Wickets	70
Bowling average	24.08
5 wickets in innings	4
10 wickets in match	1
Best bowling	7/11
Catches/stumpings	19/–
- Source: CricketArchive, 6 December 2022

Robert James Hamilton Lambert (18 July 1874 – 24 March 1956) was an Irish cricketer. A right-handed batsman and a right-arm off spin bowler, he played 51 times for the Ireland cricket team between 1893 and 1930, including 23 first-class matches, captaining them on 13 occasions. He also played first-class cricket for London County and Woodbrook Club and Ground. On his death, the Wisden Cricketer's Almanack described him as the best all-rounder produced by Ireland.

== Education and career ==
Born 18 July 1874 in Dublin, Ireland, his parents were Kate (née Barrett) and Thomas Drummond Lambert. Lambert was educated at Rathmines School and Wesley College in Dublin and at St John's College in Preston before attending the University of Edinburgh Veterinary School, where he trained to become a veterinary surgeon, which was to become his profession when not playing cricket.

== Cricket career ==
Lambert made his debut for Ireland against I Zingari in August 1893, scoring 51 in the only Irish innings. He played three more times that year, against the Combined Services, Surrey and WH Laverton's XI, against whom he scored 115, which was the first of 101 centuries he scored in all cricket throughout his career. He played just twice for Ireland the following year, against I Zingari and South Africa.

In 1895, he played against WH Laverton's XI and twice against the MCC, including once at Lord's. This year, he also scored his first double century, an unbeaten innings of 248 for Leinster against Fitzwilliam. He played against the Marylebone Cricket Club (MCC) and I Zingari in 1896 before spending three years out of the Irish team.

He returned to the Irish side in 1899, playing against I Zingari, but then spent a further three years out of the Irish side, returning in 1902 for his first first-class match, against London County in May 1902, playing three further first-class matches for Ireland that month, against the MCC, the University of Oxford and the University of Cambridge. In June 1903, he played for Ireland against London County on 15 June in Mardyke, Cork, and then travelled across the Irish sea with London County to play a first-class match for them against Lancashire at Old Trafford starting on 18 June. He scored 46 not out and 38 in the match, with W. G. Grace describing his play as perfection.

In 1904, he played for Ireland against South Africa and twice against the University of Cambridge. He played seven more times for Ireland in the remainder of the decade, including matches against Philadelphia, Scotland, South Africa and Yorkshire. This time period also saw his highest score in all cricket, an innings of 256 for Leinster against County Kildare in 1906. He played just five times for Ireland in the following decade, four times against Scotland and once against South Africa. In 1912, he played a first-class match for Woodbrook Club and Ground against South Africa.

The 1920s saw the bulk of his international cricket career for Ireland, playing several matches, mainly against Scotland and the MCC, with matches also being played against the Irish military and Wales. His final first-class match was for Ireland against the MCC in August 1928. His last match for Ireland was also against the MCC, in August 1930. For a batsman who scored over 37,000 runs in all cricket in his career, it was a rather embarrassing last match, as he was dismissed for a duck in both innings of the match.

He continued playing club cricket for another four years, scoring his hundredth hundred for Leinster against Halverstown, during which an opposing bowler was overheard to say to his teammates, "This bloody Lambert just won't quit". After his playing career ended, he served as president of the Irish Cricket Union three times, in 1931, 1932 and 1947. He also served as an Irish selector for a number of years. He died 24 March 1956 in Dublin.

=== Statistics ===
In all matches for Ireland, Lambert scored 1954 runs at an average of 27.91, with a top score of 116 not out against Philadelphia in August 1908. He scored eight half-centuries, and four centuries. He took 173 wickets at an average of 18.65, with best innings bowling figures of 7/11 against Scotland in July 1910, also his best first-class bowling performance. He took five wickets in an innings twelve times and ten in match four times. In first-class cricket, his top score was 103 not out for Ireland against Scotland.

== Badminton ==
Lambert was also a fine badminton player, representing Ireland internationally, and winning the Irish championship in 1911. He was one of the founding members of the Ailesbury Badminton Club in 1903.

== Family ==
Bob Lambert came from a cricketing family. His brother Sep also represented Ireland at cricket, as did his son Ham. Another son was the art collector Gordon Lambert.
