= Dublin 1 =

Dublin 1 (D1) Baile Átha Cliath 1
- Postal district
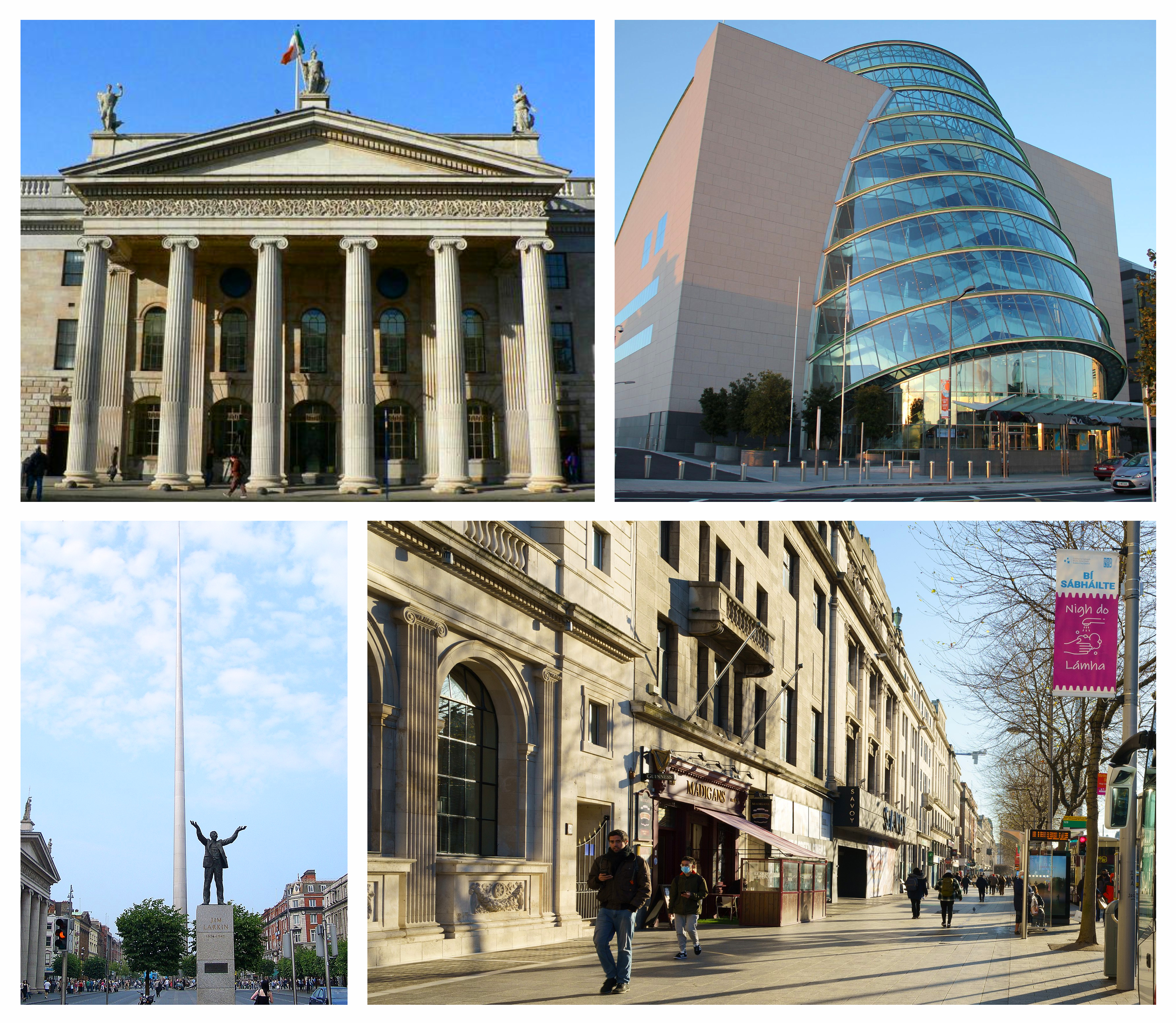
- Clockwise from top: the General Post Office, the Convention Centre, northern O'Connell Street, the Spire of Dublin.
- Country: Ireland
- Province: Leinster
- Local authority: Dublin City Council
- Dáil constituency: Dublin Central
- EP constituency: Dublin
- Postal district(s): D1/D01
- Dialing code: 01, +353 1

Dublin 1, also rendered as D1 and D01, is a postal district on the northside of Dublin, Ireland.

== Area profile ==
D1 lies entirely within the Dáil constituency of Dublin Central. Dublin Central is one of the most densely populated and socially and ethnically diverse areas in Ireland. The postcode consists of most of the northern city centre, affluent white collar areas around and including Mayor Square, and traditional working class areas such as Sheriff Street. In 2019, the Irish Independent reported that Dublin City Council embarked on a plan to improve lighting and surfacing in the area's laneways while Ireland's National Tourism Development Authority has said the regeneration of a historic part of Dublin 1 tied to the Easter Rising is "long overdue". The American Institute of Architects has been hired by a local business group to help regenerate the area, which they say faces "civic schizophrenia" and "a split personality".

== Notable places ==
The postcode covers a dense central area north of the River Liffey. It includes O'Connell Street, Parnell Street, Henry Street, Jervis Street, Mountjoy Square, Parnell Square, the International Financial Services Centre, and parts of the northern Docklands. It is home to Busarus, Connolly Station, the Custom House, the Convention Centre Dublin, and several of the north city quays. It also features urban secondary schools such as the O'Connell School and Belvedere College as well as third-level institutions such as the National College of Ireland.

== Usage in Dublin addresses ==
The postal district of Dublin 1 is used in conjunction with the seven-digit Eircodes that are unique to each address in the state. For example:

Dublin City Gallery The Hugh Lane
Charlemont House
Parnell Square North
Dublin 1
D01 F2X9

== Gallery ==
The Garden of Remembrance, Parnell Square.

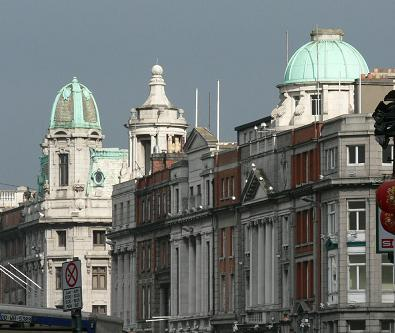
Neoclassical buildings along O'Connell Street.

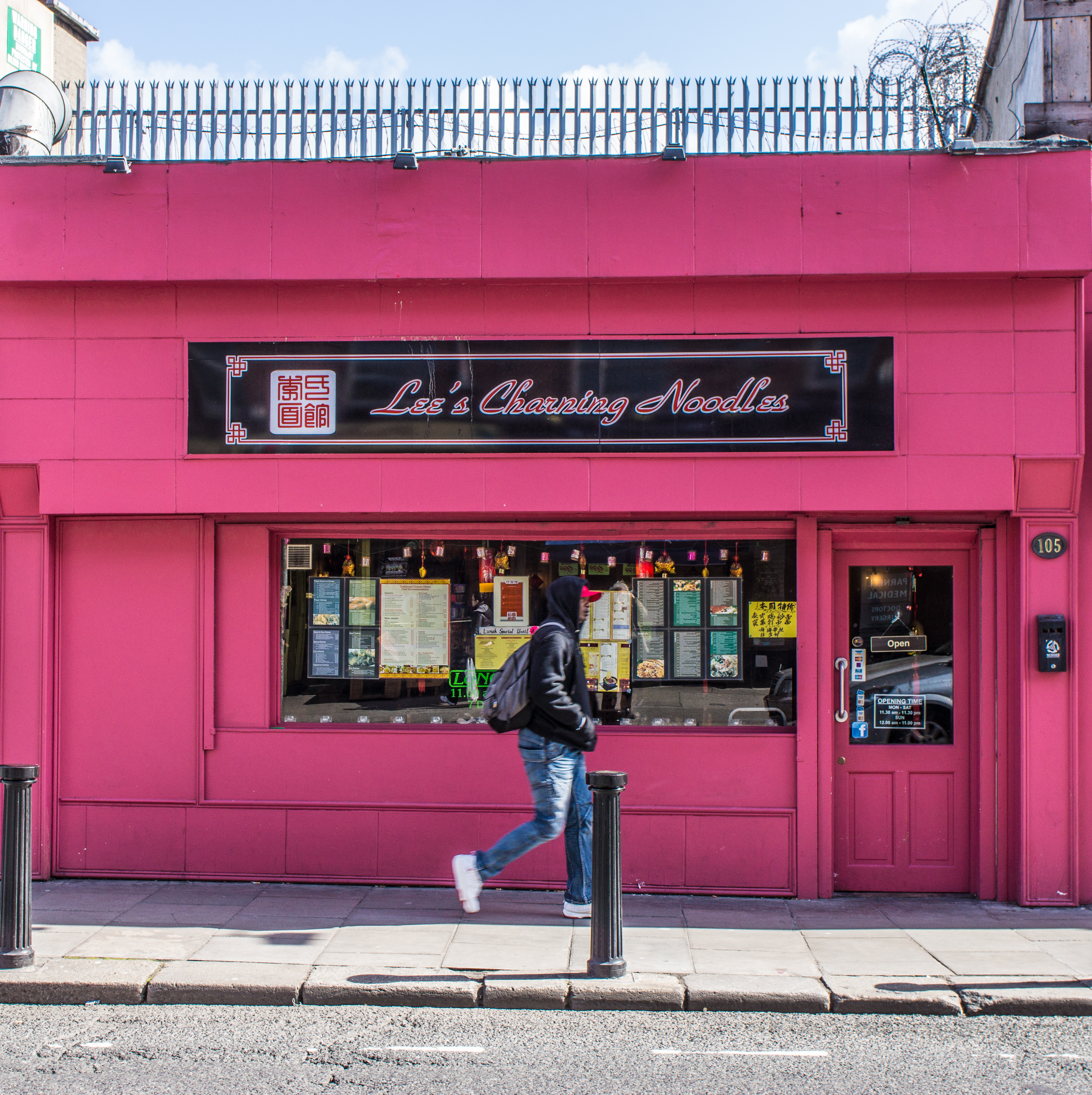
A restaurant in Dublin's Chinatown, Parnell Street.

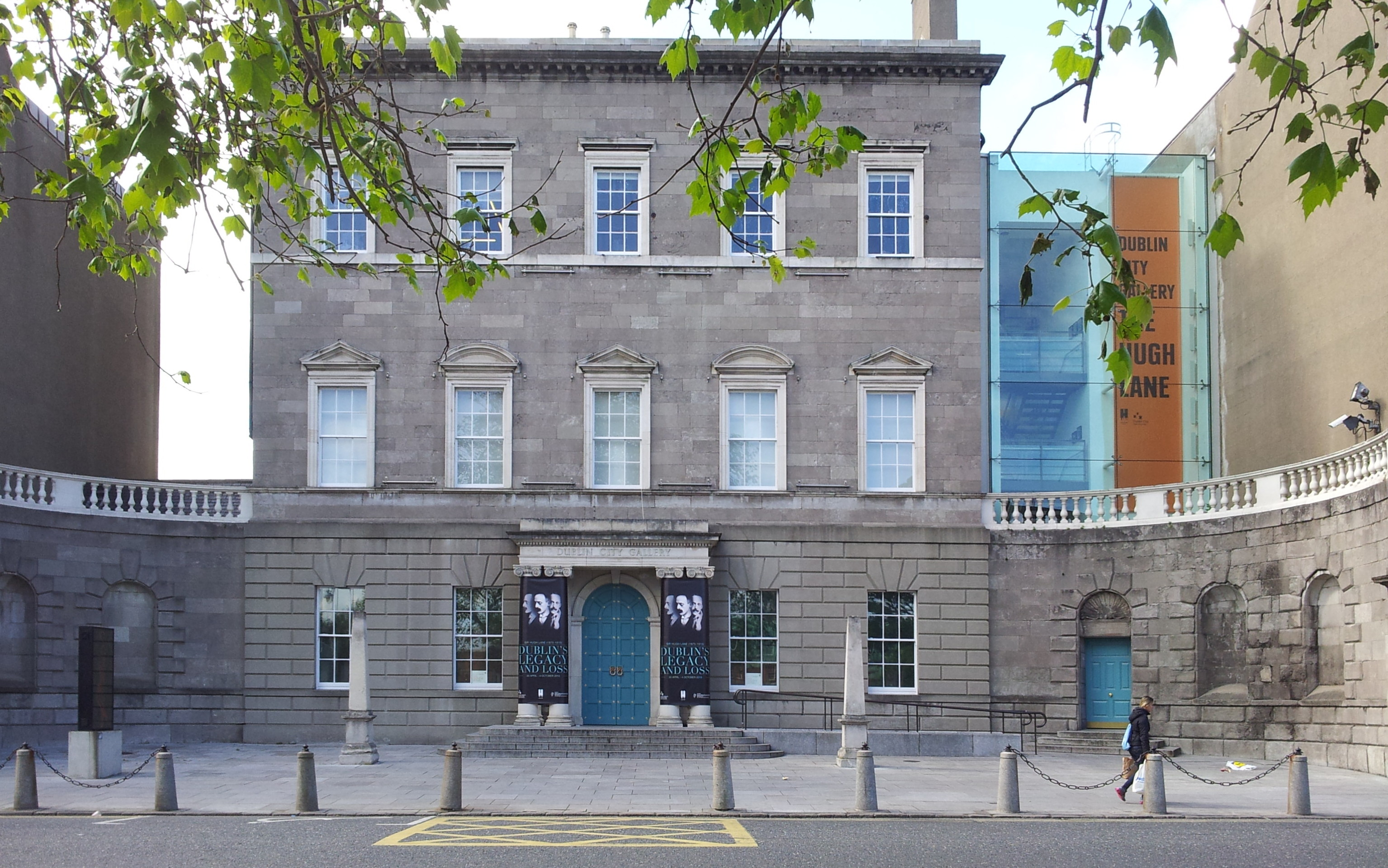
The Hugh Lane Gallery, Parnell Square.

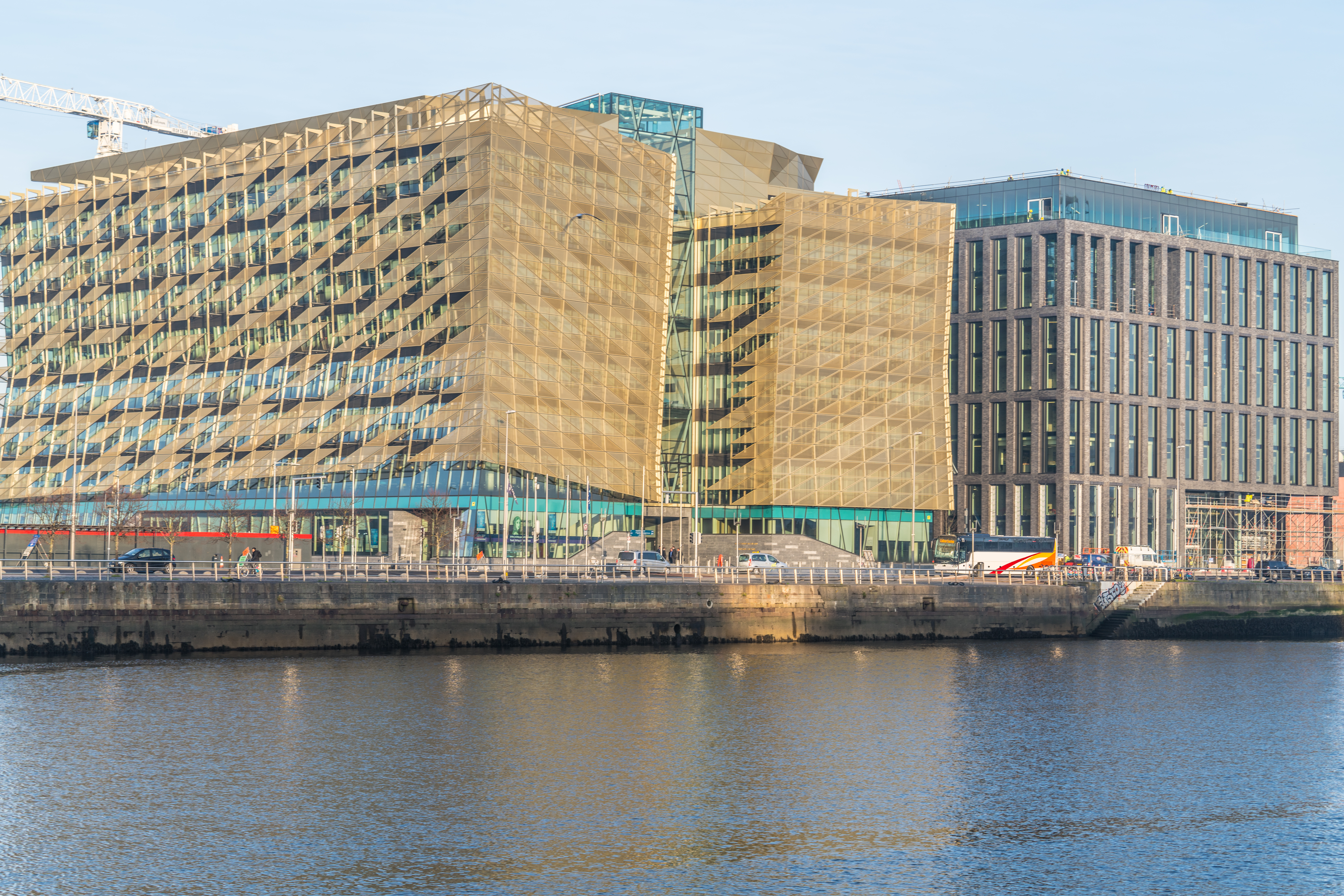
The Central Bank of Ireland, North Wall Quay.

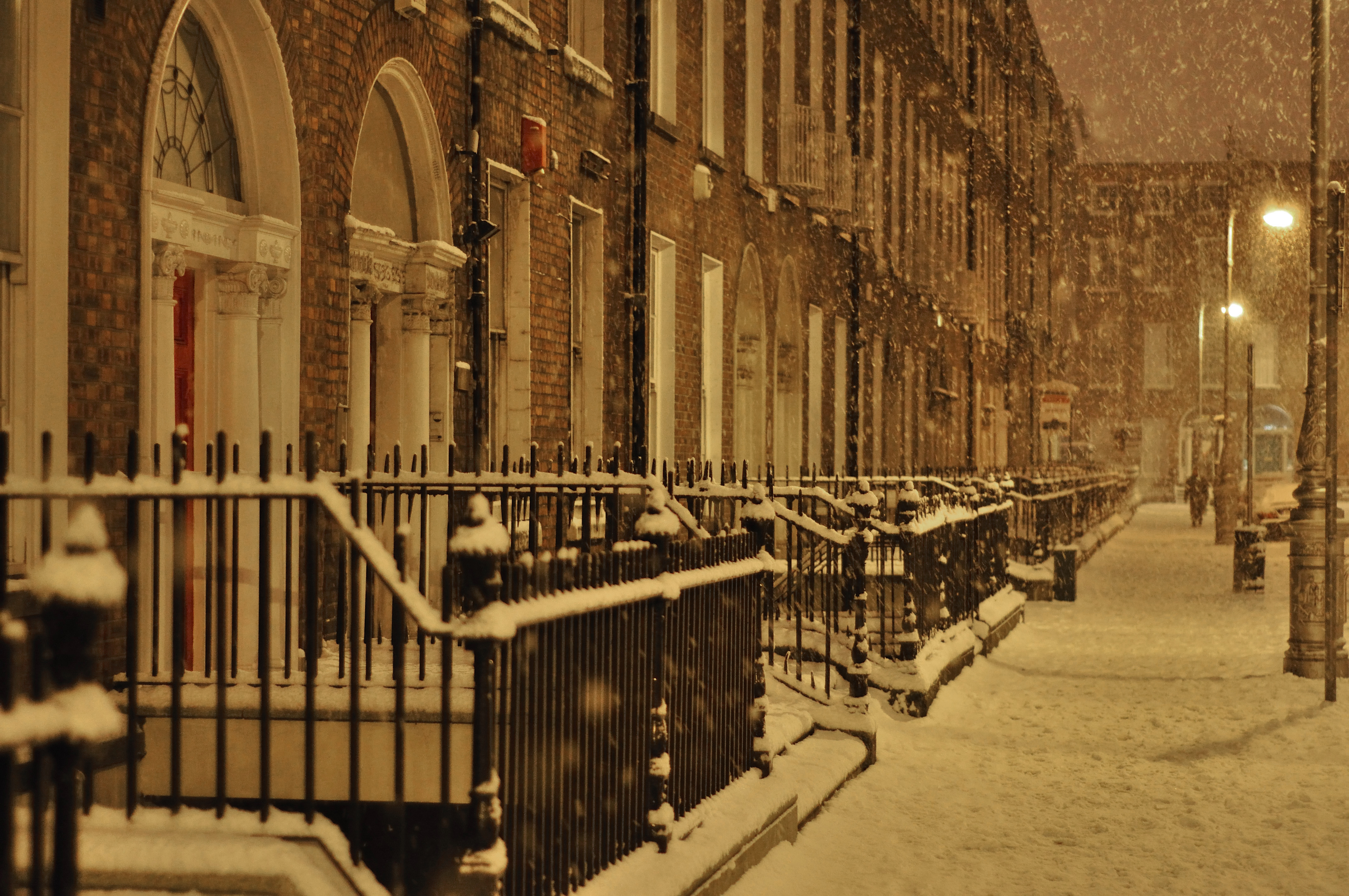
Mountjoy Square in winter.

== See also ==
- List of Dublin postal districts
- List of Eircode routing areas in Ireland
- List of postal codes
