= Zomerland =

Coordinates: 51°53′36″N 4°32′37″E

- Neighborhood of Rotterdam
- Interactive map of Zomerland
- Country: Netherlands
- Province: South Holland
- COROP: Rotterdam
- Borough: IJsselmonde
- Time zone: UTC+1 (CET)

Zomerland is a neighborhood of Rotterdam, Netherlands.
