= Gateway (sculpture) =

Sculpture by Irish artist Michael Warren

- The Gateway
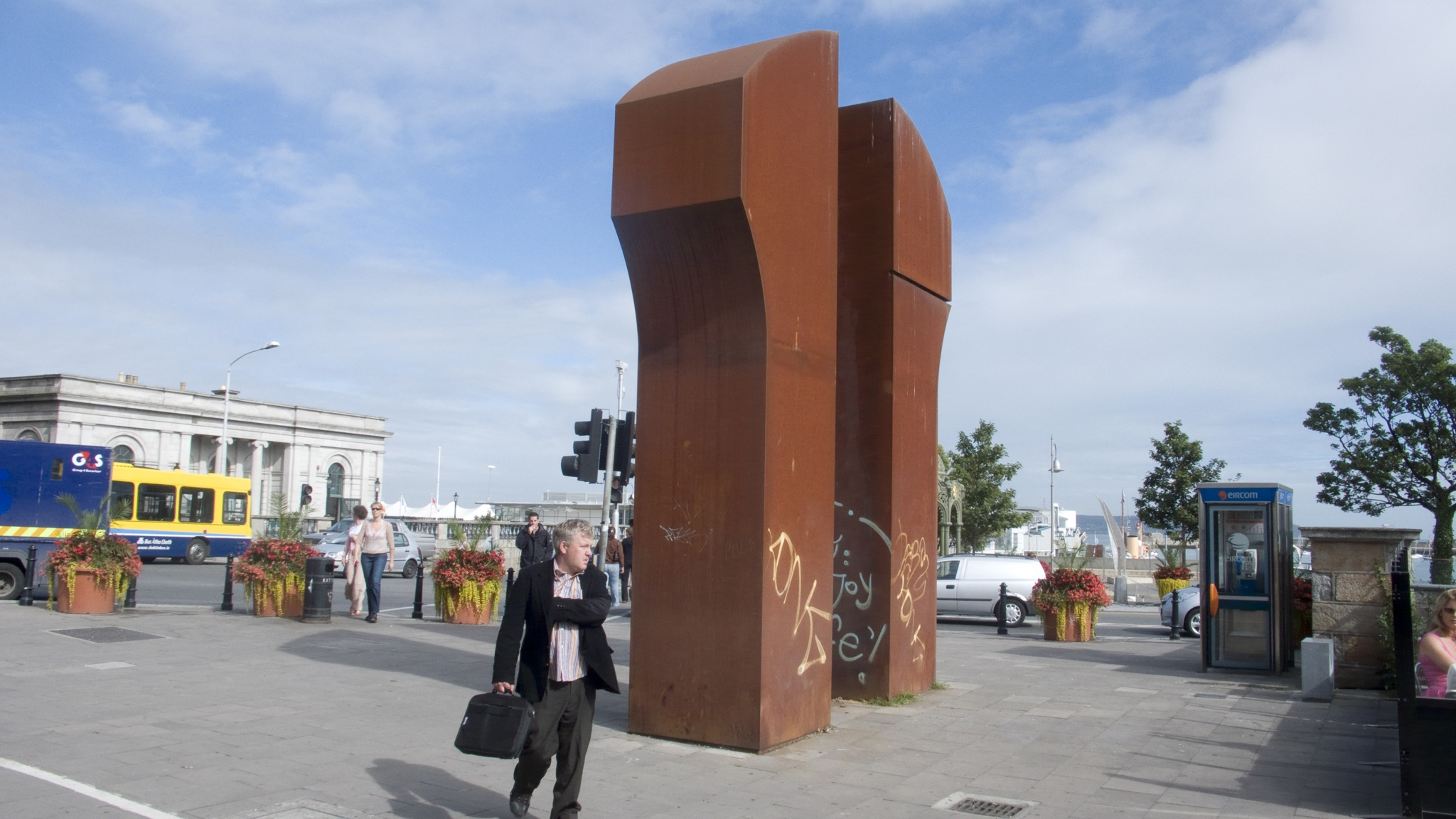
- Gateway at its previous location near the Victoria Fountain and the Pavilion Theatre in Dún Laoghaire, Dublin
- Artist: Michael Warren
- Year: 2002
- Dimensions: 20 feet (6.1 m) cm
- Weight: 8 tonnes (8,000 kg)
- Location: Dún Laoghaire, Dublin; 2002 – 2009 53.294331°N 6.133707°W
- Preceded by: Her Hair (II), Courtown Harbour, County Wexford, Ireland
- Followed by: East Point, East Point, Dublin, Ireland

Gateway, or The Gateway, is a sculpture by Irish sculptor Michael Warren. It was commissioned by developer Eddie Sweeney and originally placed in Dún Laoghaire, County Dublin, Ireland, before being placed into storage as part of a regeneration project. It was swapped with Warren's Angel Negro.

== History ==
Gateway was created by Michael Warren, with developer Eddie Sweeney commissioning and funding it as part of a percent for art scheme. It was inspired by 18th-century gateways at Mechants' Quay and Dublin Castle. It was installed near the Pavilion Theatre in Dún Laoghaire, County Dublin, Ireland in 2002 after it was gifted to Dún Laoghaire-Rathdown County Council.

The sculpture was very controversial, and was removed and placed into storage—near Cabinteely House off the N11—on 23 April 2009, as part of a redevelopment plan, with plans to re-erect it after completion of the regeneration. After the regeneration was completed, the statue was not re-erected. In December 2013, Dún Laoghaire councillors decided to swap the piece with Warren's Angel Negro, which was placed in the DLR Lexicon.

== Reception ==
The statue was highly controversial, with calls for its removal existing since its installation in 2002. Local councilors were initially positive about the sculpture, but after local elections, many called for its removal. Councillor Jane Dillon Byrne said that she wished it was moved to the Dún Laoghaire Institute of Art, Design and Technology The Irish Independent has called the sculpture "rusty pillars". Teachta Dála (TD) Mary Mitchell O'Connor said it created a "sense of decay" in Dún Laoghaire.
