= 東丈 =

東丈 may refer to:

- Jō Azuma, fictional character in Japanese Genma Wars franchise
- Joe Higashi, fictional character in the video game Fatal Fury series

== See also ==
- Azuma (disambiguation)
- Higashi (disambiguation)
- Jo (disambiguation)
- Joe (disambiguation)
