= East (disambiguation) =

East is a cardinal direction or compass point.

East or the East may also refer to:

== Places ==
- Eastern world, or the East or historically the Orient, usually including Asia, the Mediterranean region and the Arab world
  - Orient, the East in relation to Europe
- Eastern Bloc, communist states during the Cold War
- East (Cornish hundred), historic division in England
- East (European Parliament constituency), in Ireland
- East Flatbush, a residential neighborhood of Brooklyn, New York City, home to many residents of Caribbean descent
- East New York, a residential neighborhood of the easternmost region of Brooklyn, New York City
- East, West Virginia, United States
- Eastern United States, often abbreviated as simply the East, the United States east of the Mississippi River

== Arts and entertainment ==
=== Film and television ===
- The East (2013 film), a thriller
- The East (2020 film), a Dutch war film
- The East (TV series), a 2015 Indonesian comedy
- East (The Walking Dead), a TV episode
- Channel East, a defunct British television channel

=== Literature ===
- East (novel), by Edith Pattou, 2003
- East (play), by Steven Berkoff, 1975

=== Music ===
- East!, a 1968 album by Pat Martino, and its title track "East"
- East (Cold Chisel album), 1980
- East (Justin Rutledge album), 2016
- East (EP), by Ego Likeness, 2012
- "East", a song by Billy Paul from the 1971 album Going East
- "East", a song by Earl Sweatshirt from the 2019 EP Feet of Clay

== Businesses and organizations ==
- European Association for Solar Telescopes, a consortium for the development of the European Solar Telescope
- East Asia School of Theology, in Singapore
- Eastern Association for the Surgery of Trauma, an American medical association
- The East (Brooklyn), a black nationalism community education and arts organization

== Other uses ==
- East (surname), including a list of people with the surname
- Easter Island Standard Time, a timezone in Chile
- Eastern Line (Auckland) (timetable code: EAST), New Zealand
- Experimental Advanced Superconducting Tokamak, a nuclear fusion experiment facility in China

== See also ==
- Easts (disambiguation)

=== East ===
- East River (disambiguation)
- East Point (disambiguation)
- East Bay, a portion of the San Francisco Bay Area
- Far East, the region comprising East Asia and Southeast Asia
- East Asia
- East Coast of the United States

=== Eastern ===
- Eastern (disambiguation)
- Byzantine Empire, or Eastern Roman Empire
- Eastern Europe

=== Translations ===
- Azuma (disambiguation), Japanese for east

Higashi (disambiguation), also Japanese for east

- Est (disambiguation), French for east
- Este (disambiguation), Spanish for east
- Vostok (disambiguation), Russian for east
