= East Point =

East Point is the name of several places:

== United States ==
- East Point, Alabama
- East Point, Georgia
  - East Point station
- East Point, Kentucky
- East Point, Louisiana
- East Point Military Reservation, in Nahant, Massachusetts
- East Point, Texas
- East Point, Virginia

== Other places ==
- East Point, Northern Territory, Australia
- East Point, British Indian Ocean Territory
- East Point, Prince Edward Island, Canada
- East Point, Hong Kong
- East Point Business Park, Dublin, Ireland
- East Point City, New Territories, Hong Kong

== Other uses ==
- East Point Academy, in Lowestoft, England
- East Point Football Club, in Victoria, Australia
- East Point Business Park, in Dublin, Ireland

== See also ==
- Eastpoint, Florida, U.S.
- Eastpoint Mall, U.S.
- Eastpoint Mall, Singapore
- Eastpointe, Michigan, U.S.
