= County Hall, Dún Laoghaire =

Municipal building in Dún Laoghaire-Rathdown, Ireland

- Halla an Chontae, Dún Laoghaire
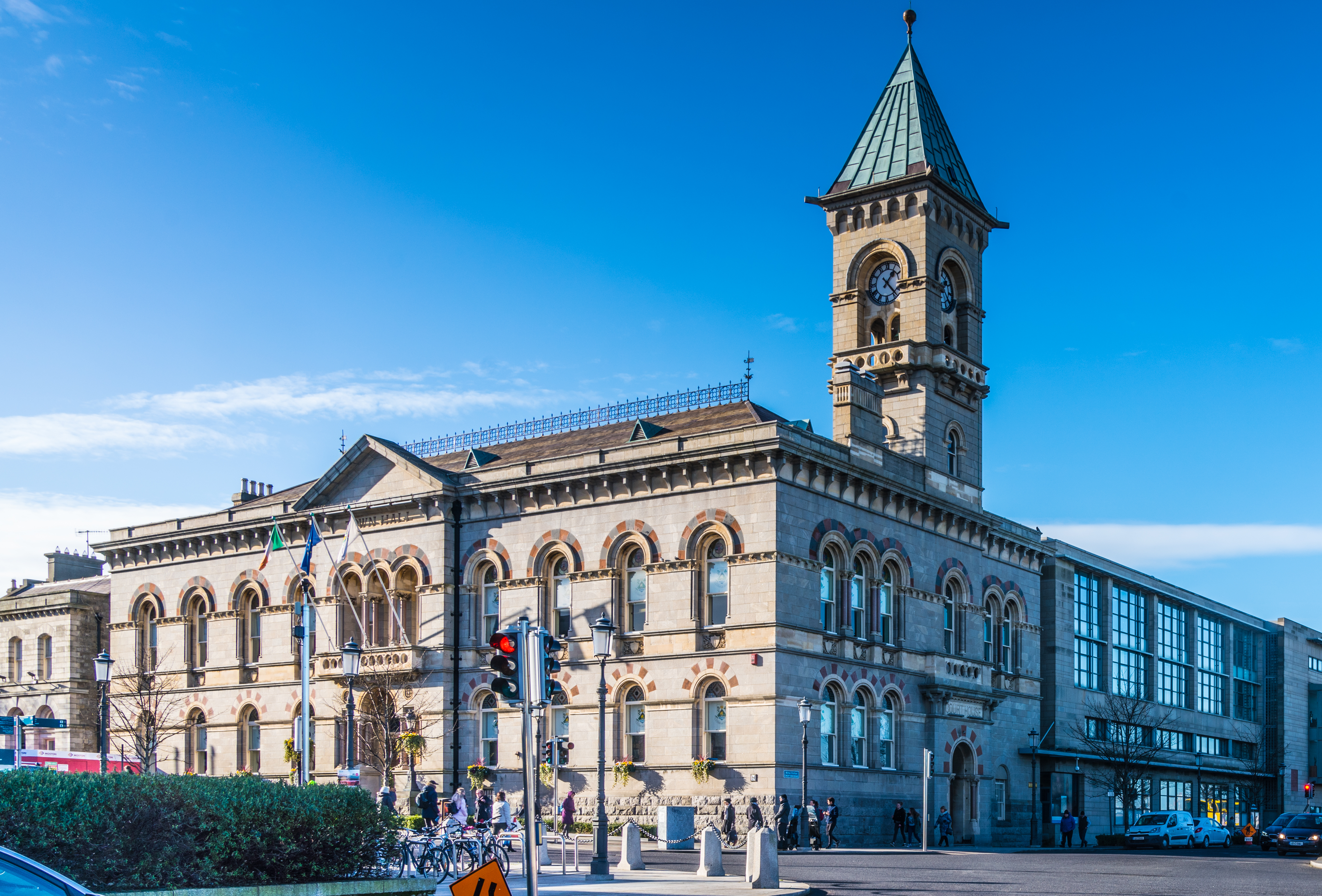
- County Hall, Dún Laoghaire

- Location within Dublin

General information
- Architectural style: Lombard Romanesque style
- Location: Marine Road, Dún Laoghaire, Ireland
- Coordinates: 53.2943°N 6.1348°W
- Completed: 1880

Design and construction
- Architect: John Loftus Robinson

County Hall (Irish: Halla an Chontae, Dún Laoghaire), formerly known as Dún Laoghaire Town Hall, and before that, Kingstown Town Hall, is a municipal facility in Marine Road, Dún Laoghaire in the county of Dún Laoghaire–Rathdown, Ireland.

== History ==
After significant population growth, largely associated with the development of the harbour, the township of Kingstown appointed town commissioners in March 1855. The commissioners identified the need for a town hall at an early stage although it was not until the early 1870s that a suitable site on the sea front was selected. The foundation stone for the new building was laid in November 1877. It was designed by John Loftus Robinson in the Lombard Romanesque style, built by Meade & Son in ashlar stone at a cost of £16,000 and was officially opened on 20 April 1880.

The design involved a symmetrical main frontage of nine bays facing onto Marine Road. The central bay, which was slightly projected forward, featured, a recessed doorway with lancet windows, flanked by colonnettes, on either side. On the first floor, there was a balcony and an arcade, formed by three round headed windows with architraves and coloured voussoirs flanked by colonettes. The central bay was surmounted by an entablature carved with the words "Town Hall", and a pediment. The wings of four bays each were fenestrated by round headed windows with architraves and coloured voussoirs on both floors: the first-floor windows were flanked by colonettes. On the east side, which provided access to a courthouse, there was a four-stage tower, which was 120 feet (37 m) high. It featured a round headed doorway in the first stage, round headed windows in the second and third stages, and clock faces in the fourth stage, all surmounted by a pyramid-shaped roof. Internally, the principal rooms were a courtroom on the ground floor and a large assembly room and a board room for the town commissioners, both on the first floor.

The building became the home of Kingstown Urban District Council on its formation in 1899, and was re-named Dún Laoghaire Town Hall in the lead-up to the creation of the Irish Free State in August 1920. The building became the home of the Corporation of Dún Laoghaire on its formation in October 1930. The Irish republican and leader of Fianna Fáil, Éamon de Valera, gave a speech on his party's policies in the town hall in November 1930.

The town hall was also a venue for concerts and theatrical performances: the Pike Theatre Players, founded by Alan Simpson and Carolyn Swift performed their first play, The Millstone, in the town hall in September 1951.

An extensive programme of refurbishment works, involving the replacement of the plaster and timberwork, was carried out at a cost of £800,000 to a design by Gerry McEvoy, and completed in June 1990. Following the implementation of the Local Government (Dublin) Act 1993, the old post office to the south of the town hall was converted for use as an entrance block for a large extension, erected around a central courtyard, which was designed by McCullough Mulvin-Robinson Keefe Devane and built to the west of the town hall. The complex was renamed County Hall when it re-opened as the headquarters of Dún Laoghaire–Rathdown County Council in the mid-1990s. The building benefited from a further refurbishment, involving significant changes to the internal layout, undertaken at a cost of €3 million in 2018.
