= Azuma =

Azuma may refer to:

== Places ==
- Azuma, historical name for eastern Japan, now called Kantō and Tōhoku region
- Azuma, Gunma (Agatsuma), former village in Agatsuma District, Gunma Prefecture, Japan
- Azuma, Gunma (Sawa), former village in Sawa District, Gunma Prefecture, Japan
- Azuma, Gunma (Seta), former village in Seta District, Gunma Prefecture, Japan
- Azuma, Ibaraki, former town in Ibaraki Prefecture, Japan
- Azuma, Kagoshima, former town in Kagoshima Prefecture, Japan
- Mount Azuma, volcano in Fukushima Prefecture, Japan

== People ==
- Azuma (name)

== Ships ==
- Japanese ironclad Azuma, an ironclad warship of the Imperial Japanese Navy
- Japanese cruiser Azuma, an armored cruiser of the Imperial Japanese Navy

== Other uses ==
- Azuma's inequality, result in probability theory
- British Rail Class 800 and 801 trains, branded as Azuma on the East Coast Main Line in the United Kingdom

== See also ==
- East (disambiguation)
- Higashi (disambiguation)
- Inazuma (disambiguation)
