= Bandai-Azuma Roadway =

Coordinates: 37.7292°N 140.2593°E

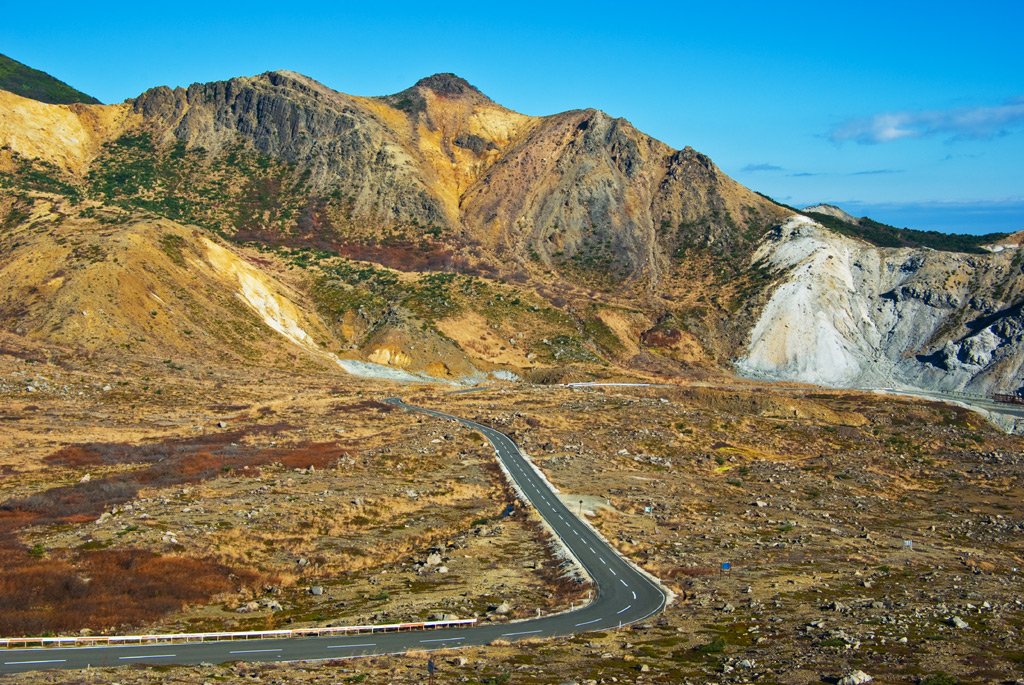
The Bandai-Azuma Skyline in early November

The Bandai-Azuma Roadway (磐梯吾妻道路, Bandai Azuma Dōro), also known as the Bandai-Azuma Skyline (磐梯吾妻スカイライン, Bandai-Azuma Sukairain), is a road in Fukushima Prefecture in the Tohoku region, of Honshu, Japan. It is managed by the Fukushima Prefectural Roadway Public Corporation (福島県道路公社, Fukushima-ken Dōro Kōsha).

Opening in November 1959, the roadway was created to allow visitors to the Tohoku area sightseeing access to the Azuma Mountain Range. The project was part of a larger plan to open up the Bandai-Asahi National Park to tourism. The completed road runs from Fukushima City's Takayu Hot Springs to Tsuchiyu Pass (土湯峠, Tsuchiyu Tōge) for a total distance of 28.7 km.

The roadway passes directly next to the crater of Mt. Azuma, so visitors who so desire can park their cars in the nearby visitor center and take the short hike up to the crater's rim.

For successfully displaying the sheer scale of the country's Azuma Mountain Range to the visitors of the road, the Bandai-Azuma Roadway was selected by the Japanese Ministry of Construction as one of the top 100 roads in Japan.

Due to heavy snowfall in the winter, every year the road is closed from mid-November until early April. Formerly a toll road, it was permanently made free in July 2013.
