= Dún Laoghaire =

Coastal town in County Dublin, Ireland

- Suburban town
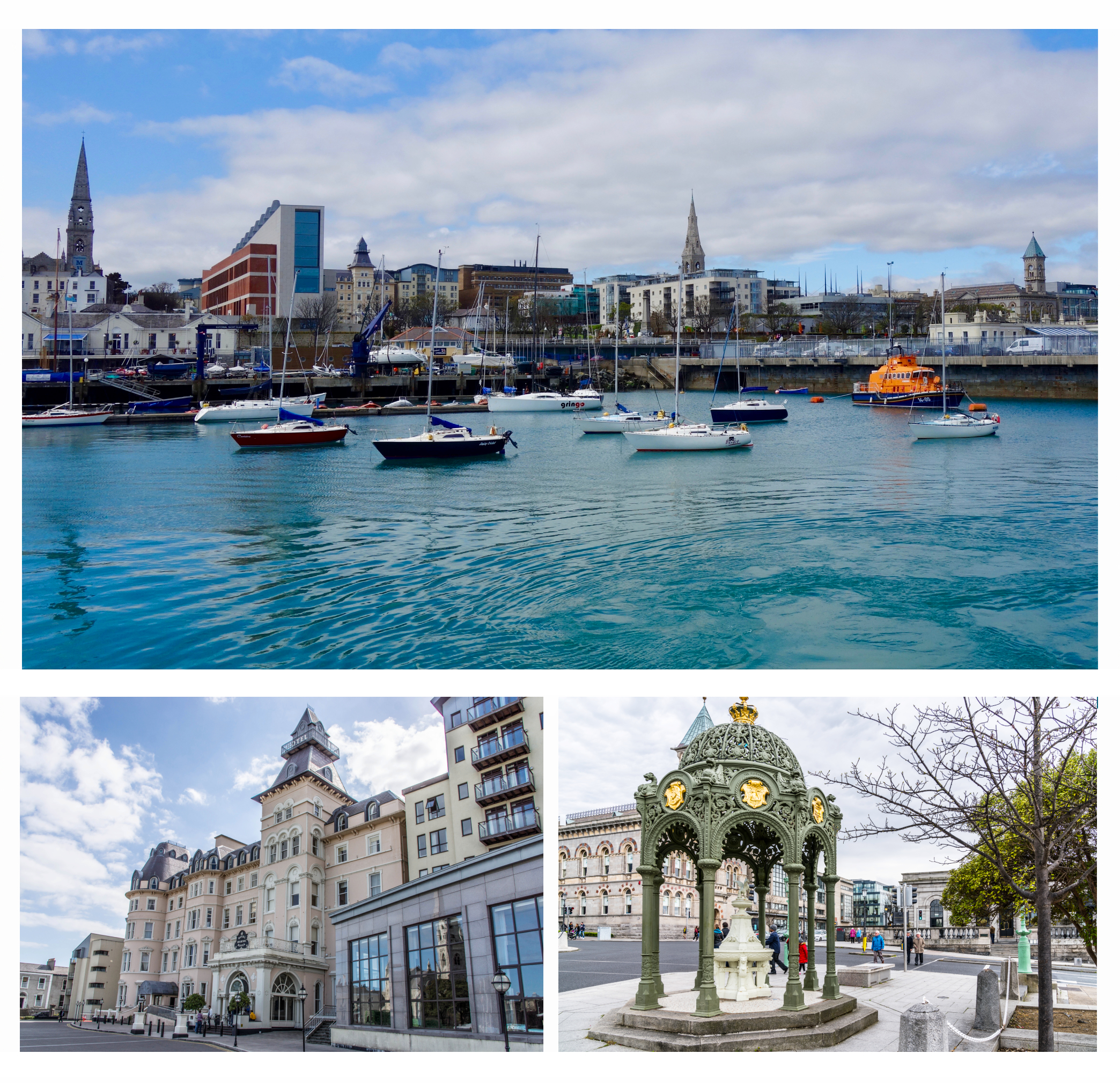
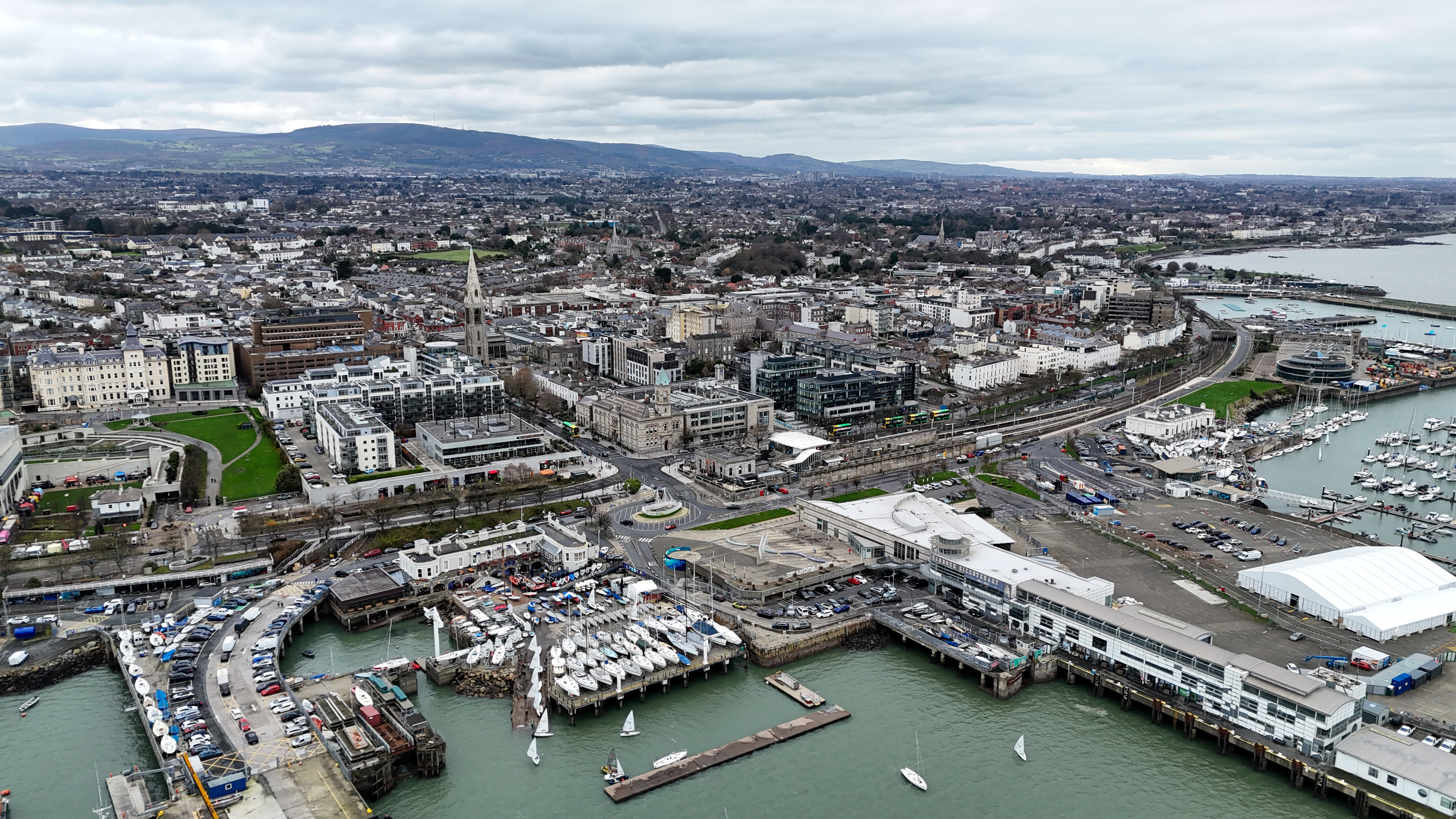
- Clockwise from top: Dún Laoghaire harbour; the Queen Victoria Memorial Fountain; Dún Laoghaire skyline; Royal Marine Hotel

- Location in Ireland Dún Laoghaire (Ireland)
- Coordinates: 53.30°N 6.14°W
- Country: Ireland
- Province: Leinster
- County: County Dublin
- Local government area: Dún Laoghaire–Rathdown
- Elevation: 24 m (79 ft)

Population (2022)Dún Laoghaire EDs
  - Total: 31,239
- Eircode routing key: A96
- Area code: 01 (+3531)

Dún Laoghaire (/dʌn ˈlɪəri/ dun LEER-ee, Irish: [ˌd̪ˠuːn̪ˠ ˈl̪ˠeːɾʲə, - ˈl̪ˠiːɾʲə]) is a suburban coastal town on the southside of Dublin, Ireland.

The town was built up alongside a small existing settlement following 1816 legislation that allowed the building of a major port to serve Dublin. It was known as Dunleary in the English language, until it was renamed Kingstown in honour of George IV's 1821 visit, and in 1920 was given its present name, which is the original Irish form from which "Dunleary" was anglicised. Over time, the town became a residential location, a seaside resort, the terminus of Ireland's first railway and the administrative centre of the former borough of Dún Laoghaire, and from 1994, of the county of Dún Laoghaire–Rathdown, within the traditional County Dublin.

== Toponymy ==
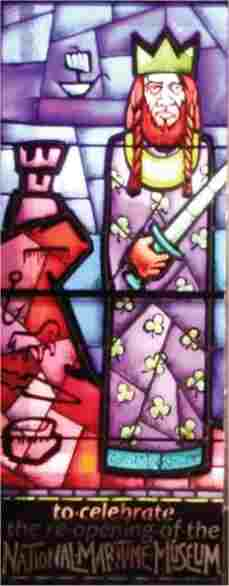
Lóegaire from a stained glass window in the Maritime Museum

The town's name means "fort of Laoghaire". This refers to Lóegaire mac Néill (modern spelling: Laoghaire Mac Néill), a 5th-century High King of Ireland, who chose the site as a sea base from which to carry out raids on Britain and Gaul. Traces of fortifications from that time have been found on the coast, and some of the stone is kept in the Maritime Museum. The name is officially spelt Dún Laoghaire in modern Irish orthography and in general usage. It is sometimes unofficially written as Dún Laoire. The old anglicised spelling Dunleary is also seen. This last is how the town's name is commonly pronounced, although the Irish pronunciation is also common.

== History ==
=== Origins ===
Dún Laoghaire's origins are generally assumed to trace back to a fort that is believed to have stood there and mostly likely to have belonged to Lóegaire mac Néill. A 1686 map of Dublin Bay by Greenvile Collins gives the name as Dun Lerroy. A later map from 1728 shows a small fishing village at the old harbour, marked as Dunlary or in other later maps as Dunleary. The earlier village was around the area where the Purty Kitchen pub is now (sometimes mapped as "Old Dunleary"). It had a coffee house and a small cove, both of which are shown on a number of old maps, and it may have had a salt mine (Salthill is close by). At that time, the area was a craggy, rocky pastureland spotted with some granite quarries.

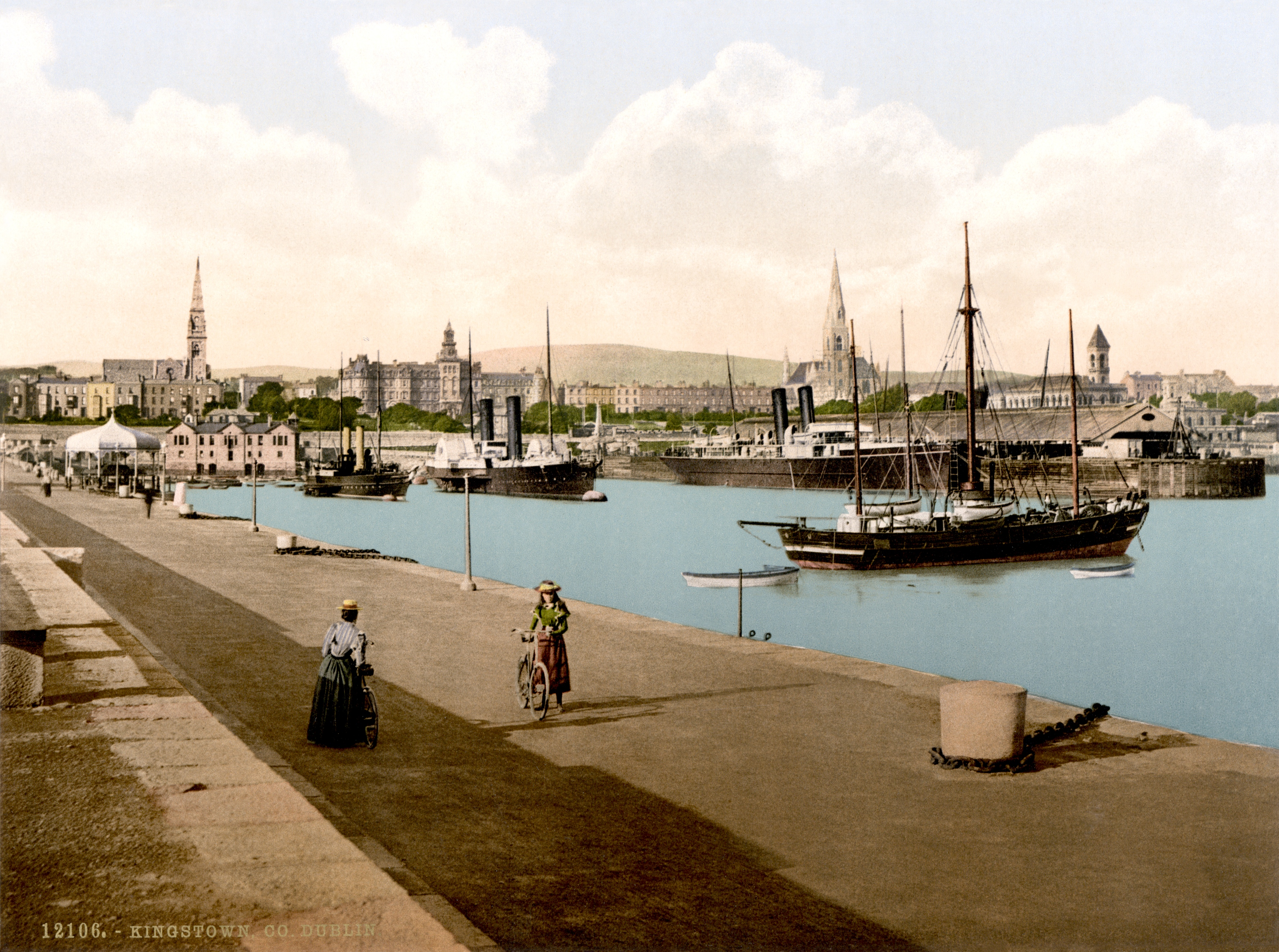
Harbour in Dún Laoghaire, then known as Kingstown, in about 1895

=== Harbour project ===
While there had been plans for the construction of an "asylum harbour" at Dún Laoghaire for some time, it wasn't progressed until after the sinking of two troopships, Prince of Wales, and Rochdale, which were driven on to the rocks, after departing from Dublin, between Blackrock and Dún Laoghaire on the night of 18–19 November 1807. This disaster, which resulted in the loss of over 400 lives, gave new impetus to the existing campaign for the harbour and began construction in 1817.

=== 19th century ===
When George IV came to visit the new port under construction in 1821, the name Dunleary was replaced by "Kingstown" in his honour. The town returned to its former name in August 1920, in the lead-up to the creation of the Irish Free State.

Ireland's first railway, covering the five and a half miles from Dublin (Westland Row station) to Kingstown was opened on 17 December 1834. Costing £200,000, it terminated at the old harbour of Dunleary, which adjoins today's West Pier. Soon afterwards, the railway was extended to Victoria wharf (later St. Michael's Wharf) of the new Dún Laoghaire harbour. Originally fares were sixpence (third class), eight pence (second class) and a shilling (first class). The journey took 15 minutes in 1837. The railway established Kingstown as a preferred suburb of Dublin and led to the construction of residential terraces. Gresham Terrace (now demolished) consisted of eight houses which formed one side of Victoria Square, so named at the request of Princess Victoria.

By 1844, the Atmospheric Train connected Kingstown to Dalkey, leading to further development. The original station building was replaced in 1854 by a granite pavilion built in the neo-classical style by architect John Skipton Mulvany. The building, which has high ceilings and arched windows, has been in use as a restaurant since 2007. The Atmospheric Railway ceased operation in 1854 but was replaced by an extension of the mainline railway, which was ultimately extended to the ferry port of Rosslare. The opening of the railway from Dublin saw Kingstown become a Victorian era seaside resort. Capitalising on this, a small establishment named Hayes Hotel was purchased by railway engineer William Dargan and on the same site enlarged and incorporated into the new Royal Marine Hotel in 1863.

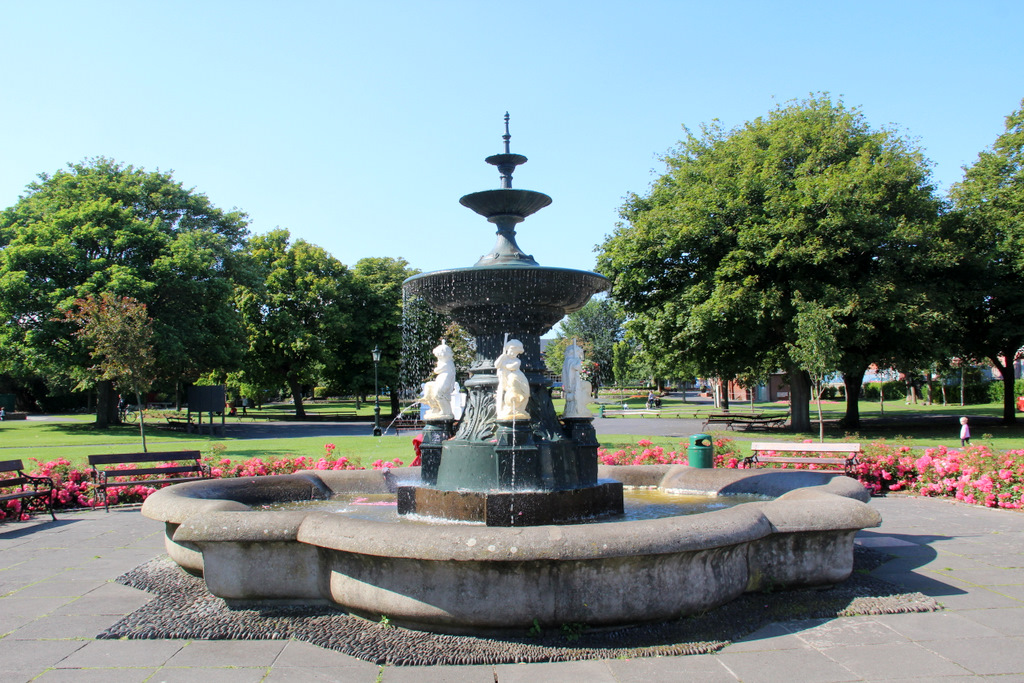
People's Park

In 1880, the Kingstown Town Commissioners established Kingstown Town Hall (now County Hall) on the sea front and, in 1890, they established the People's Park on the site of a depleted Board of Works quarry.

=== 20th century and today ===
The British 59th (2nd North Midland) Division disembarked at Kingstown in April 1916 and marched up the road to Dublin, to participate in the response to the Easter Rising. Adjacent to the Carlisle Pier and overlooked by the National Maritime Museum of Ireland, there is an anchor, recovered from the wreck of the mailboat RMS Leinster which was torpedoed by the Imperial German Navy over the Kish Bank in 1918, with the loss of over 500 lives.

The main road to Dublin, through Monkstown and Blackrock, was the sole road connection to the city until 1932. In that year, the Eucharistic Congress brought thousands of visitors to Dublin, and plans indicated that many of them would come through Dún Laoghaire.

Dún Laoghaire was hit by stray German bombs during the Second World War, with a couple of them landing near the People's Park at Rosmeen Gardens. Damage from the bombs was limited to buildings.

== Features ==
=== Harbour ===
The harbour, one of the largest in the country, is notable for its two granite piers. The East Pier is particularly popular with walkers, and was featured in the 1996 film Michael Collins, where Liam Neeson (as Collins) and two of his co-stars are seen walking along a seaside promenade, which is the Dún Laoghaire East Pier. A band is seen playing on a bandstand in this film scene, and this is the actual bandstand on the East Pier. The bandstand was restored to its original condition in 2010 by the Dún Laoghaire Harbour Company.

It took 42 years to construct the harbour, from 1817 to 1859. Initially it was thought that one pier (east pier) of 3,500 feet would be sufficient to provide shelter to shipping. It wasn't until the first pier was in use that the authorities realised the need for protection from winds from the west and north west. The West Pier was commenced in 1820 and was constructed with a length of 4,950 feet. The mouth of the harbour is 850 feet wide. The piers were built of perfectly square blocks (50 cubic feet) of Runcorn sandstone from foundation level up to 14 feet high. From six feet below low water level to coping level, the piers are built from granite obtained from nearby Dalkey Quarry. The piers are 310 feet wide at foundation level, and 53 feet wide at the summit.

An obelisk standing on four granite balls located near the old ferry port terminal at the harbour commemorates the departure of George IV and the renaming of the place as Kingstown.

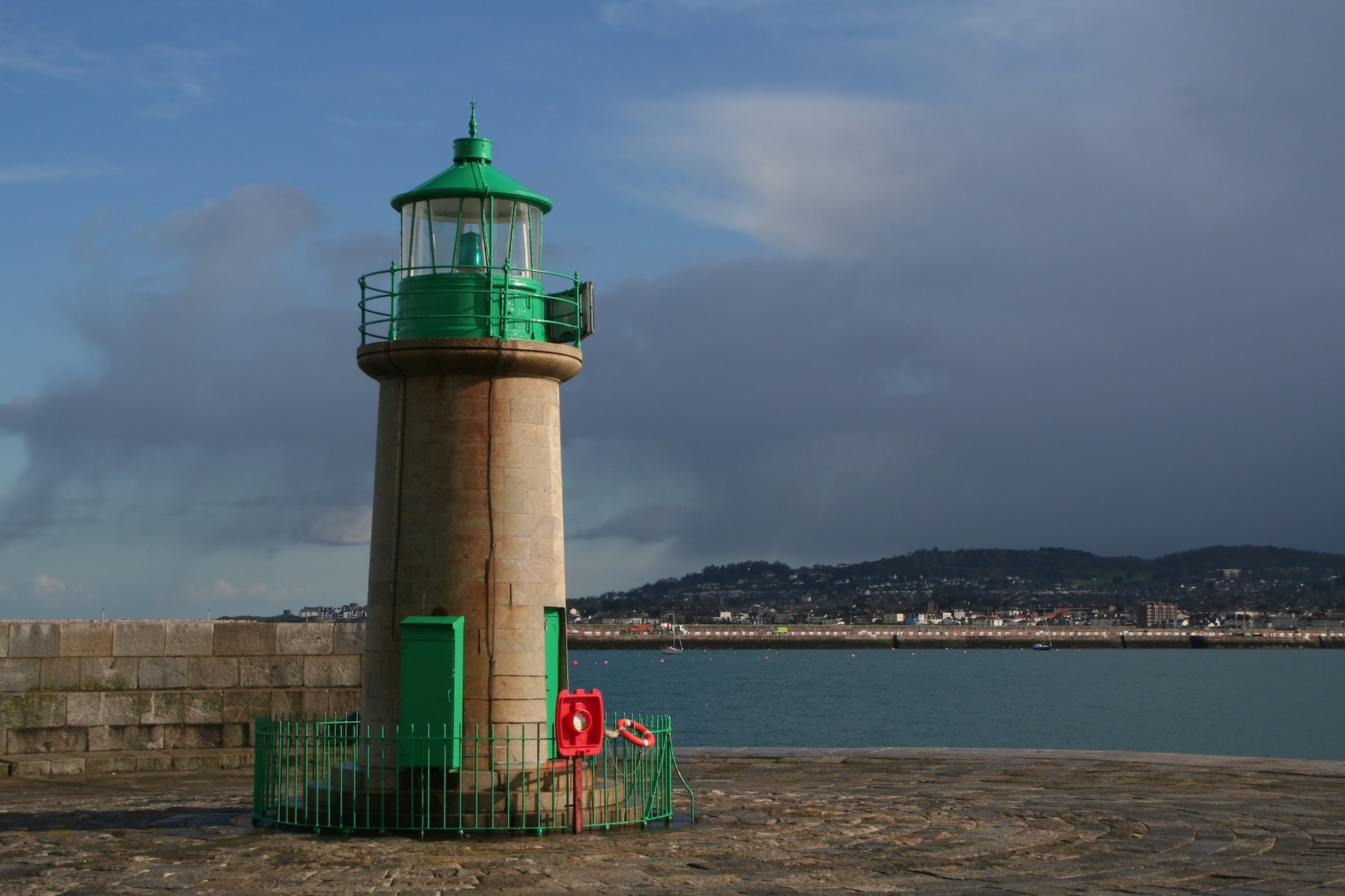
Harbour in Dún Laoghaire

A lighthouse was at the end of the East Pier, while the new headquarters of the Commissioners of Irish Lights (the General Lighthouse Authority for Ireland) is on Harbour Road.

=== Other coastal features ===
South of the harbour is Scotsman's Bay, where there was a Victorian seaside amusement area, with walks, shelters and baths. The walks and shelters are largely intact. Dún Laoghaire Baths, which had been derelict for many years, were repainted in bright colours in 2012. In 2022, the restored historic baths were re-opened, facilitating sea swimming but without the salt water pool of the 1920s Royal Victoria baths.

=== Parks and walks ===
A traditional Victorian-style park, the People's Park, lies at the eastern end of George's Street. It holds a playground, bandstand, fountains and, since 1997, tea rooms.

The Pavilion Gardens was previously located at the centre of Dún Laoghaire. After years of decline, it was redeveloped and is now the site of the modern Pavilion Theatre.

Beside the Pavilion Gardens site is Moran Park, redeveloped as part of the Lexicon library project, and originally the site of the harbour authority's office and harbourmaster's house. At the inland side of this small public park was a deep former steam engine water storage pond, which was reworked into a water feature inland of the Lexicon library building.

=== Museum ===
The National Maritime Museum of Ireland is housed in Mariners' Church, which formerly served the Royal Navy. It is directly inland from the East Pier. The building has been completely renovated and reopened.

=== Libraries ===
Overlooking the harbour and beside the maritime museum is the DLR Lexicon, the central library and cultural centre of Dún Laoghaire-Rathdown. It opened in 2014, replacing the Carnegie library which had opened in 1912 on Library Road. Costing an estimated €36.6 million, the new building attracted much criticism prior to its opening on account of its size and design. The large building also contains the county library headquarters.

=== Other community facilities ===
Community facilities include the Boylan Community Centre, the Dún Laoghaire Scout Den, and a community information service in the tower building of St Michael's Church.

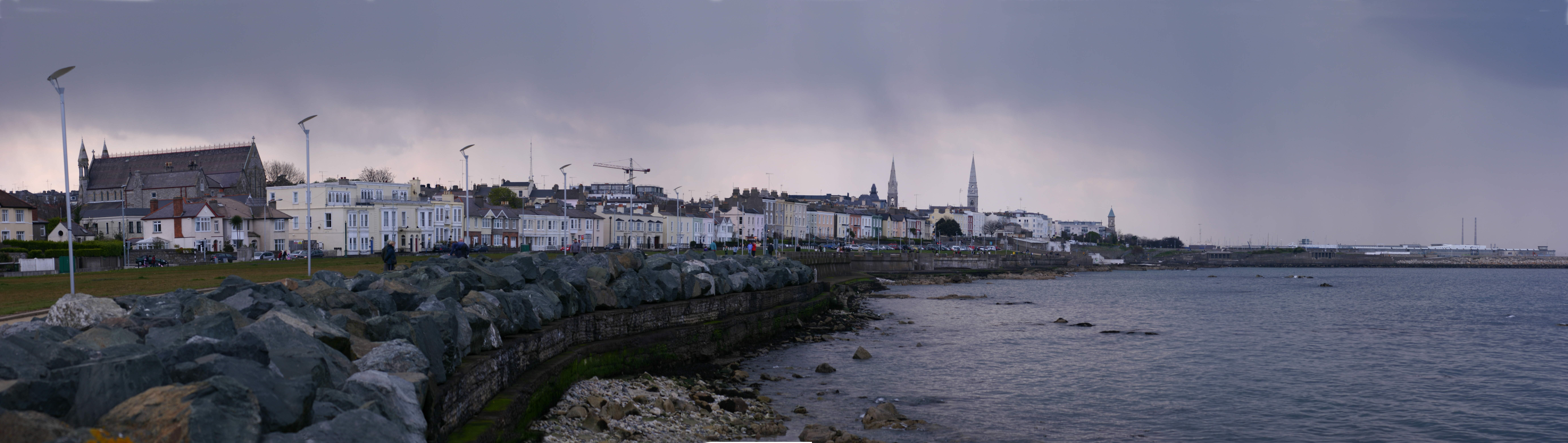
Dún Laoghaire promenade.

=== Rescue services ===
An inshore and offshore lifeboat operated by the RNLI are based in Dún Laoghaire Harbour. The offshore boat is normally moored adjoining the Carlisle Pier. The inshore boat is stored in a stone shed at the base of the East Pier. Until recently lifeboat crews were called to duty using a maroon launched from the shore base.

=== Historical features ===
At least one traditional "cabman's shelter" survives – these were small buildings built for the drivers of horse-drawn taxis.

== Transport ==
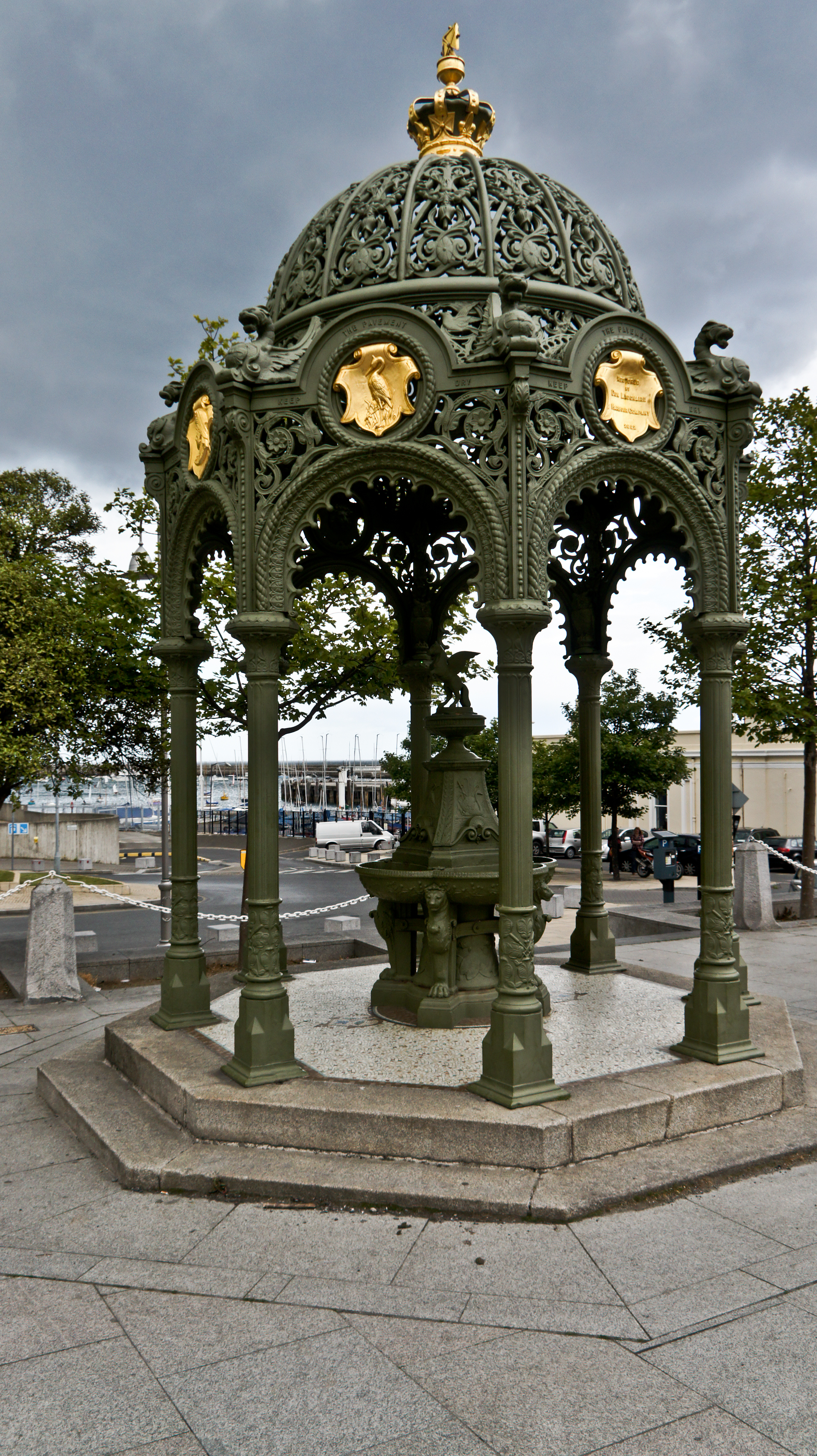
Queen Victoria fountain

=== Public transport ===
Dún Laoghaire is connected to central Dublin by the DART services, the South Eastern Commuter line and the mainline rail service that runs from Dublin to Rosslare. Dún Laoghaire was also formerly served by the Dublin tramways routes 7 and 8 and was the terminus for the former until the tram lines ceased operations on 9 July 1949. The town is also served by several bus routes which are the 7/A/B/D/N (Mountjoy Square to Brides Glen/Loughlinstown/Shankill/Dalkey), 45A/B (Kilmacanogue), E2 (Harristown), 59 (Killiney), L27 (Leopardstown), 111 (Brides Glen to Dalkey), S8 (Citywest) and L25 (Dundrum) operated by Dublin Bus and Go-Ahead Ireland (since September 2018). The railway station is beside the terminus of the S8, L25, L27 and the E2. Sandycove and Glasthule and Salthill and Monkstown also serve the area. The 746 bus route from the station terminus to Dublin Airport was discontinued in October 2010. The 75/A also served Dún Laoghaire to Tallaght until it was replaced with the S8 and L25 on 26 November 2023 under BusConnects.

An Aircoach service links the area with Dublin Airport 24 hours a day with stops at County Hall and the Royal Marine Hotel. Route 703 travels from Killiney to Dublin Airport via Dalkey, Glasthule, Dún Laoghaire, Monkstown, Blackrock, Booterstown, Tara Towers hotel, Strand Road and The Point (3Arena).

==== Rail history ====
The Dublin and Kingstown Railway, constructed and opened in 1834, was the first-ever railway in Ireland and was built to standard gauge. Extension southward was by the standard gauge Dalkey Atmospheric Railway publicly opened in 1844 which was the first railway to have practical and commercial application of pneumatic power. In the 1850s, the Dublin and Wicklow Railway took over both lines, converting both to Irish gauge and the latter to steam locomotive haulage whilst extending further south to Bray, Wicklow. Successor companies operating the railway were: Dublin, Wicklow and Wexford Railway; Dublin and South Eastern Railway; Great Southern Railways; CIÉ; and Iarnród Éireann. An extension to Carlisle Pier for the boats operated from 1859 until 1980. The railway was subsequently extended to the south to Wexford, Rosslare Harbour and Waterford. Northwards in 1890 the line was extended to Amiens Street (now Connolly station) connecting to other railways. Electrification arrived in 1984, and the electrified suburban service was branded as DART.

=== Ferry ===
From the 19th century, the town was the principal passenger port for ferries between Ireland and Britain, with a frequent service to Holyhead in Anglesey, Wales. Among the ships which operated this route were Banshee, Llewellyn, Ulster, Munster, Leinster, Connaught, MV Cambria, MV Hibernia, Princess Maud, Holyhead Ferry 1, St. Columba and Stena Cambria. At the beginning of the 21st century the route, operated by Stena Line's Stena Explorer ran three times daily in each direction, but competition from low-cost airlines and increasing fuel costs resulted in the service being reduced to once-daily in 2008, and becoming a seasonal (summer-only plus Christmas/New Year) from 2010. From early 2015 Stena Line concentrated their Holyhead routes on Dublin Port, and withdrew the service to Dún Laoghaire.

=== Pedestrianisation ===
In the early 2000s, Lower George's Street underwent pedestrianisation, placing a ban on all general traffic with the exception of bus routes toward central Dublin. Bus routes coming along this road into Dún Laoghaire were re-routed along the seafront. This restriction was reversed in late 2008. Dún Laoghaire Business Association later (unsuccessfully) called for local parking charges to be reduced to one euro per hour (to compete with Dundrum Shopping Centre which then charged two euro for three hours).

== Sports ==
=== Boating ===
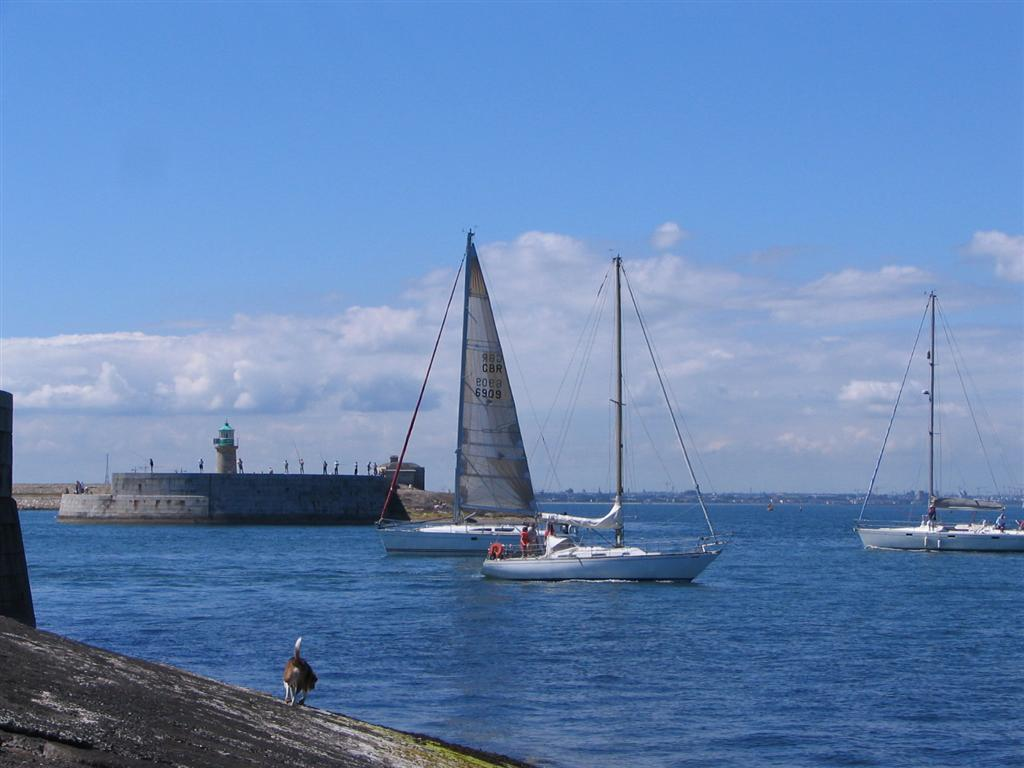
Harbour entrance from the outer side of East Pier

Regattas have taken place in Kingstown since at least 1837. Dún Laoghaire harbour is home to a number of yacht clubs of which Dublin Bay Sailing Club incorporating the Royal Alfred yacht Club is the largest. it organises racing for dinghies and keelboats on Tuesdays, Wednesdays, Thursdays and Saturdays from April to September.

Other clubs include the Dún Laoghaire Motor Yacht Club with premises on the West Pier, the Irish National Sailing School & Irish National Sailing Club based at the foot of the West Pier, the Sailing in Dublin Club with premises in the Coal Harbour, the Royal Irish Yacht Club between the Commissioners for Irish Lights and the marina entrance, the Royal St George Yacht Club (built 1842) opposite the Pavilion Centre, National Yacht Club (built 1870) closest to the East Pier and the Irish Youth Sailing Club located on the East Pier.

The area to the north of the West Pier at Salthill Beach once saw windsurfing activity over the twelve months of the year.

St Michael's Rowing Club, one of the longest-established members of the East Coast Rowing Council, has its roots in Dún Laoghaire harbour since the hobblers of the 18th and 19th centuries. The club itself has existed since the early 1920s and still resides in the Coal Harbour boatyard today. Members can regularly be seen rowing their traditional, clinker-built skiffs around the harbour and Scotsman's Bay throughout the year.

The Water Wag Club was founded in Kingstown in 1887 to "Establish a class of sailing punt with centreboard all rigged and built the same so that an even harbour race can be had with a light rowing and generally useful boat". This was the first time in yachting history that all the boats in a race should be identical, and that the winner would be the man with the greatest skill. This concept of 'One-design' has become the norm worldwide and has been adopted for all Olympic sailing events and for most World Championships in sailing. The Water Wag club prospers some 134 years later, and 'Wags' can be seen sailing in Dún Laoghaire harbour on Wednesday evenings from late April to mid-September every year.

=== Marina ===
The 820-berth marina is the largest in the country, and opened in 2001 following resistance for over 15 years by a group led by the late John de Courcy Ireland, the maritime historian. A 240-berth extension, involving an investment of €3 million, was approved in June 2006 by An Bord Pleanála; the project was completed in April 2007. The marina was the first in Ireland to be awarded a 5 Gold Anchor rating.

=== Horse racing ===
Horse racing was undertaken annually in the 1830s for the entertainment of the residents. The location for these events was at the top of York Road where several houses have names such as 'Racefield'. These events no longer take place.

=== Golf ===
The town had a golf club from 1909 to 2007, but its members agreed to sell the course to housing developers and move to Ballyman Road, near Enniskerry in County Wicklow. The golf club was on a site now occupied by Honeypark and Cualanor.

== Education ==
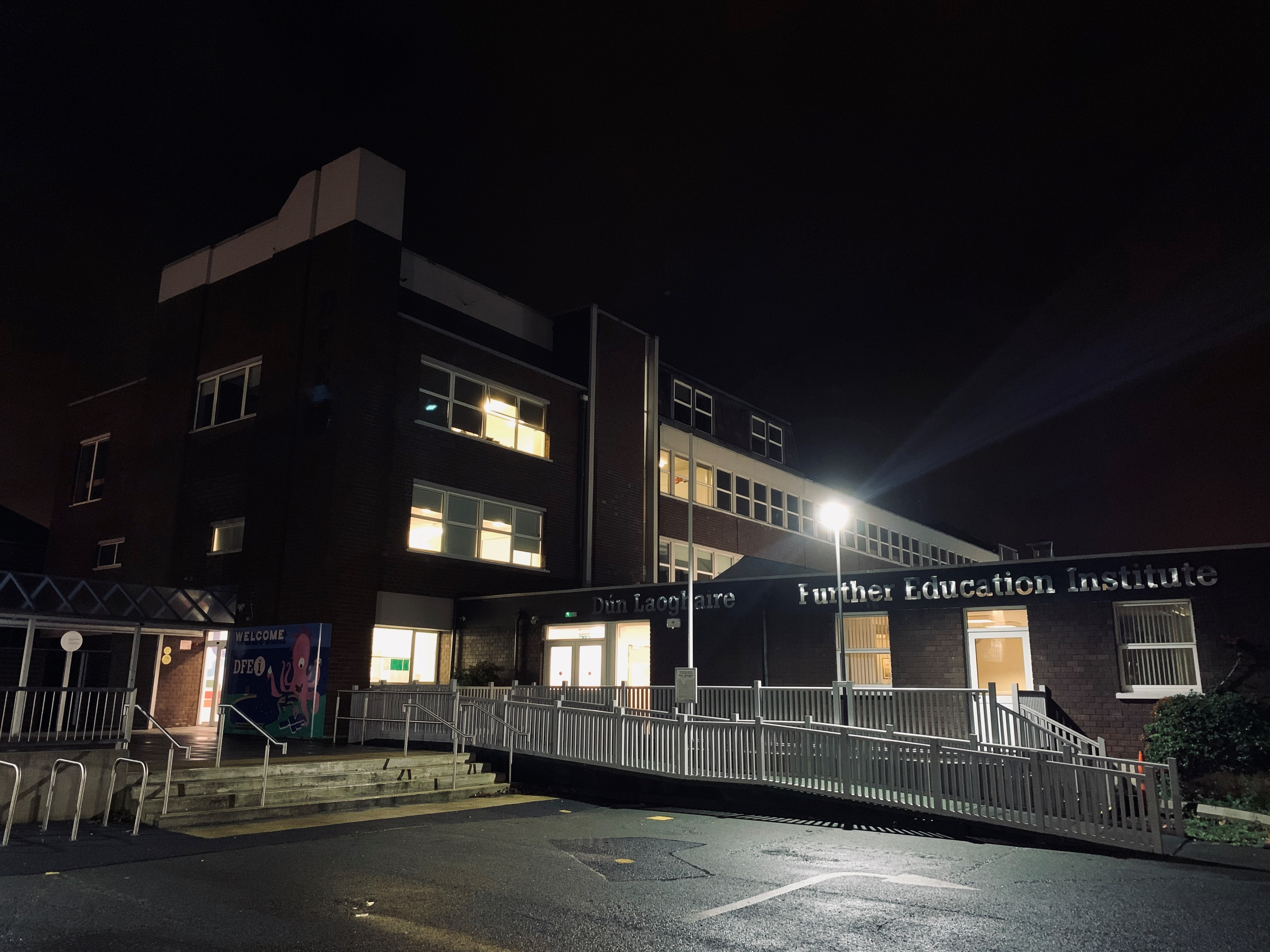
Dún Laoghaire Further Education Institute (DFEi) has been providing education to the Dún Laoghaire area since the 1890s

The Dún Laoghaire area is home to three third-level education establishments; Dún Laoghaire Institute of Art, Design and Technology (IADT), Dún Laoghaire Further Education Institute (DFEi) formerly called Dún Laoghaire College of Further Education (DCFE) on Cumberland Street in Dún Laoghaire town, and Sallynoggin College of Further Education (SCFE).

Primary schools in the Dún Laoghaire area include Dominican Primary School Dún Laoghaire, Holy Family National School in Monkstown Farm, Harold National School, Glasthule and Monkstown Educate Together National School (METNS) on Kill Avenue, Dún Laoghaire.

A number of secondary schools around Dún Laoghaire closed in the 1990s. These school closures included CBS Eblana Avenue, founded in 1856 and closed in 1992 (although the fee-paying school C.B.C. Monkstown which relocated from Eblana continues to this day); the Dominican Convent girls' school, which closed a year earlier in 1991; Dún Laoghaire Community College (previously Dún Laoghaire Tech) which changed to a Further Education Institute in 1996 and to Dún Laoghaire Further Education Institute (DFEi) since then. Presentation Brothers in Glasthule, founded in 1902, was closed in 2007.

== Retail and business ==
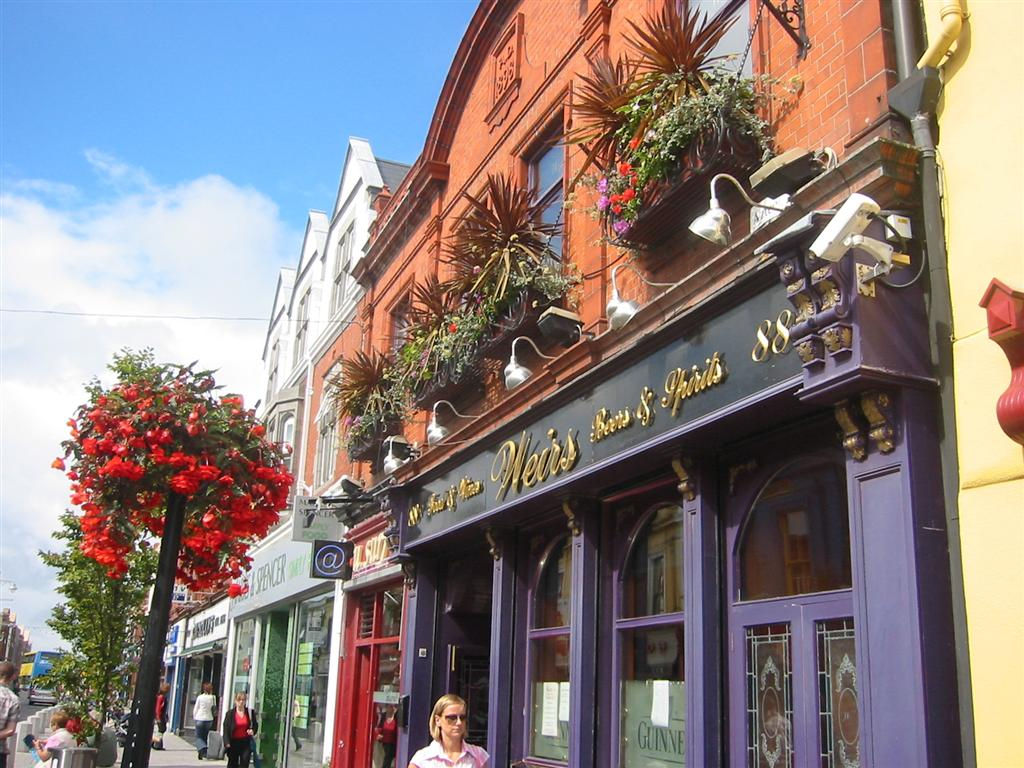
George's Street, the town's main shopping thoroughfare

Dún Laoghaire has one main shopping street, George's Street, as well as two shopping centres: the Dún Laoghaire Shopping Centre and Bloomfields, the former dating from 1977. Recent years have seen some commercial development of the land around the George's Street area, including, notably, the old Pavilion Cinema and Theatre site opposite the County Hall. There is a regular antique fair held bi-monthly, on Sundays in the Royal Marine Hotel, near the harbour, and a weekly farmers market held in the People's Park on Sundays.

There has been plenty of new investment in the area recently, and the Dún Laoghaire Shopping Centre will be subject to renovation by its owners Coltard, starting from 2016.

The town has a wide range of eating places and public houses, as well as more than one hundred other retail businesses. The town is home to the head office of Ireland's largest supermarket operator, Tesco Ireland, whose stores previously anchored both major shopping centres in the town.

Dún Laoghaire also holds other company headquarters, such as those of Bord Iascaigh Mhara and Lionbridge Ireland.

There is an active Business Association and Chamber of Commerce.

In 2018, developer Philip Gannon axed a project to convert the former ferry terminal at Dún Laoghaire into a €20 million digital hub that had been projected to bring in 1,000 jobs and 50 companies. Gannon accused Dún Laoghaire Harbour Company of failing to secure the rights to lease the ferry terminal, despite advertising it for lease.

== Health ==
Early residents moved to Dún Laoghaire for the purity of its air compared with Dublin city.

Dún Laoghaire is home to St Michael's Hospital as well as a number of private clinics, therapists and general practitioners.

== Culture ==
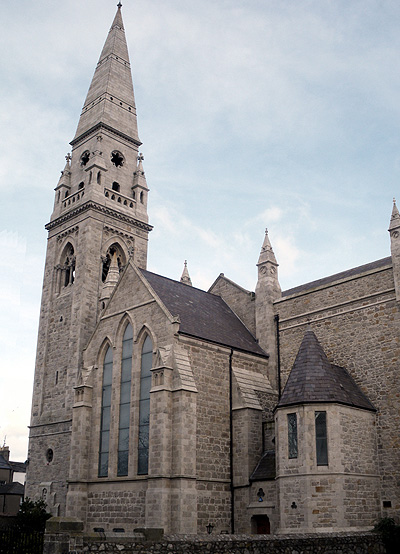
National Maritime Museum in the restored Mariners' Church

Dún Laoghaire has associations with many leading cultural figures, most notably James Joyce and Samuel Beckett. In the second chapter of Ulysses, Joyce refers to Kingstown Pier as a "disappointed bridge," and the opening chapter is based on his stay with Oliver St John Gogarty at a Martello tower located in nearby Sandycove. This tower, known as the James Joyce Tower, now contains a small museum. Samuel Beckett came from nearby Foxrock and is said to have experienced an artistic epiphany, alluded to in his play Krapp's Last Tape, while sitting on the end of one of Dún Laoghaire's piers; a bronze plaque marks the spot.

=== Historical artists and performances ===
The baritone Frederick Ranalow, who performed close to 1,500 performances in The Beggar's Opera, was born in Kingstown, although he moved to England at an early age. The black equestrian and circus owner Pablo Fanque, immortalised in the Beatles' song Being for the Benefit of Mr. Kite!, performed here for one week during a long engagement in Dublin, in 1850.

In August 1991, Seattle grunge band Nirvana played at the Top Hat.

=== Festival of World Cultures ===
Dún Laoghaire was previously home to the Festival of World Cultures. This three-day festival was one of the largest music festivals in Ireland and attracted over a quarter of a million visitors to the town over a weekend in August. The festival ran for nine years, from 2001 to 2010, until it was suspended by its operator, Dún Laoghaire Rathdown County Council. This followed a report from the former county manager who oversaw its launch, and input from the then county manager, after a deficit of over 400,000 euro was reached in 2010. The festival never resumed.

=== Facilities ===
A purpose-built theatre, the Pavilion Theatre, opened its doors in 2000. Built on the site of the 1903 Kingstown Pavilion, it serves as the municipal theatre for Dún Laoghaire-Rathdown, and is a host venue for a number of festivals, including the International Puppet Festival and the Dublin Theatre Festival.

St Michael's Church is home to the longest-running series of organ concerts in Ireland, featuring the 1974 organ by Rieger Orgelbau which is the only organ of its type in the country.

=== Architecture and sculpture ===
Off Library Road is the Dominican Oratory of the Sacred Heart, a small oratory described as a "gem of Celtic Renaissance art". It was designed by John J. Robinson, architect of Robinson and Keefe Architects and decorated by Sr. Lynch for members of the former Dominican Convent which existed on the site of the Tesco-anchored "Bloomfield" Shopping Centre.

A 20 ft-high, eight-tonne sculpture by Irish sculptor Michael Warren entitled 'Gateway' existed close to the Pavilion retail and theatre complex in the centre of Dún Laoghaire from 2002 to 2009. Made from corten steel, the sculpture had been the subject of controversy from the beginning occupying a prominent position at the bottom of Marine Road. It was removed in 2009 and placed in storage pending the completion of redevelopment works in the area, but was never re-instated. In 2015 the sculpture was returned to the artist in exchange for an alternative work entitled 'Angel Negro'.

A statue of Roger Casement, over 3 meters tall and standing on a high plinth, overlooks Dún Laoghaire's baths.

== Tourism ==
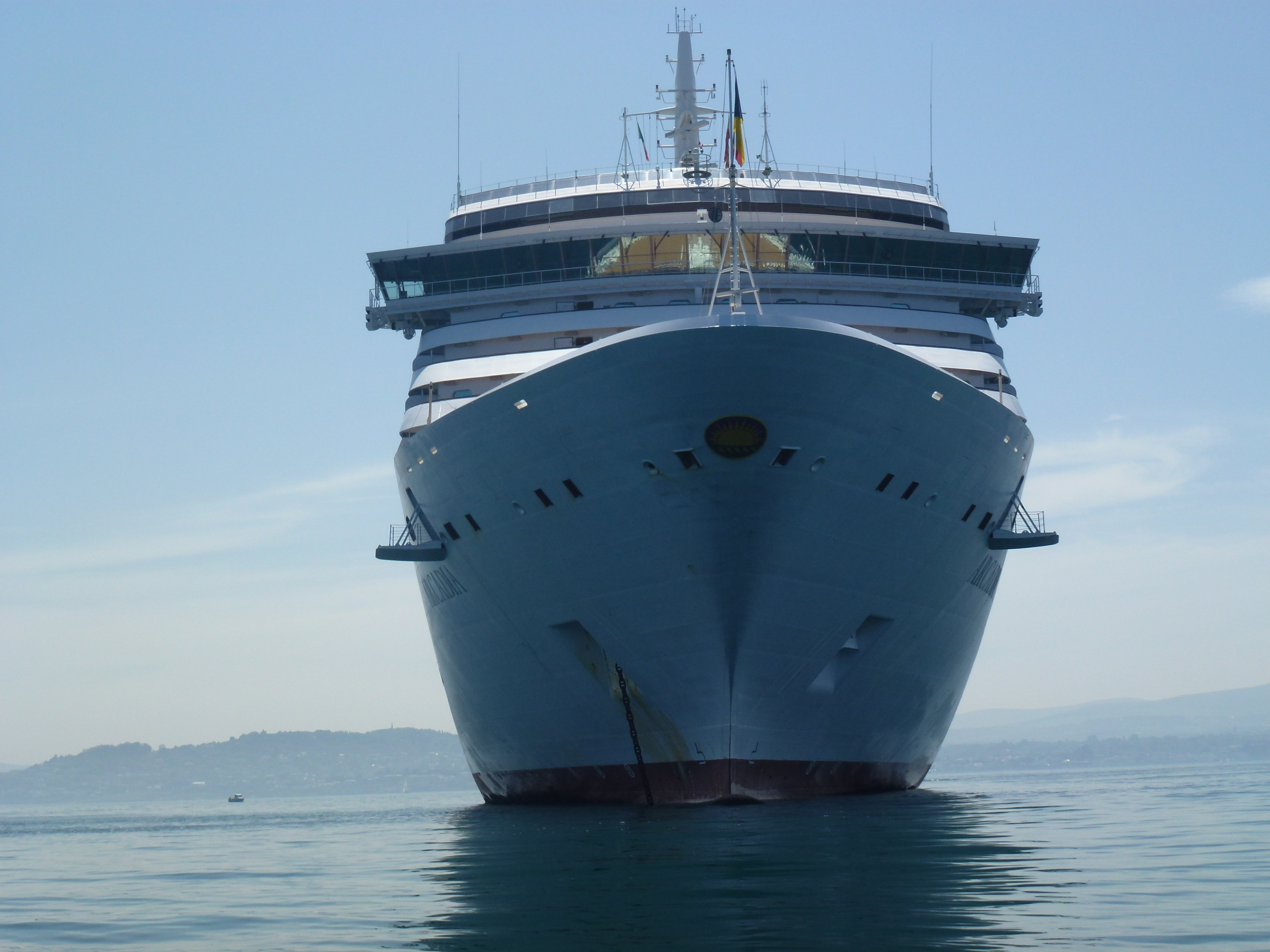
Arcadia Cruise Ship in Dún Laoghaire Harbour. The town is visible in the background.

Much of the town's early growth came from visitors from Dublin, and today there is one large hotel named the Royal Marine, along with several small hotels, and a number of bed-and-breakfasts.

The Royal Marine Hotel first opened in 1865 and has since hosted several heads of state, monarchs and celebrities, including Frank Sinatra, Laurel & Hardy and Charlie Chaplin. During Queen Victoria's last visit to Ireland in April 1900, she had a 16-course breakfast in the hotel upon disembarkation at Kingstown pier. The hotel was purchased by the 'Neville Hotels' group in 2003 and refurbished in 2007. The hotel bar was rechristened as 'Laurel's Bar' around this time.

=== Outdoor activities ===
Walking the East Pier of Dún Laoghaire Harbour is the most popular tourism activity in Dún Laoghaire. The west pier is longer but the surface of the pier is less suitable for walking.

In July 2013, the first-ever tourism office opened in Dún Laoghaire. Kayaking, kite surfing, paddle boarding and sailing are available, along with facilities for biking and rock climbing.

=== Cruise ship visits ===
In 2011, Dún Laoghaire Harbour published a master plan, which focused on developing Dún Laoghaire as a tourist destination. Specifically, the plan revolved around promoting Dún Laoghaire Harbour as a prime location for both ferries and cruise ships. Since then, many cruise ships have stopped in Dún Laoghaire, usually between the months of May and July. The first ship to arrive was the Cunard liner RMS Queen Mary 2 on 16 May, and P&O's MV Arcadia arrived on 9 July. The Queen Mary 2 was the 7th largest cruise ship in the world at the time, with a maximum passenger capacity of about 3,000. Other large vessels to visit Dún Laoghaire include the QE2 and the aircraft carrier USS John F. Kennedy.

== People ==
See Category:People from Dún Laoghaire

== Local government and politics ==
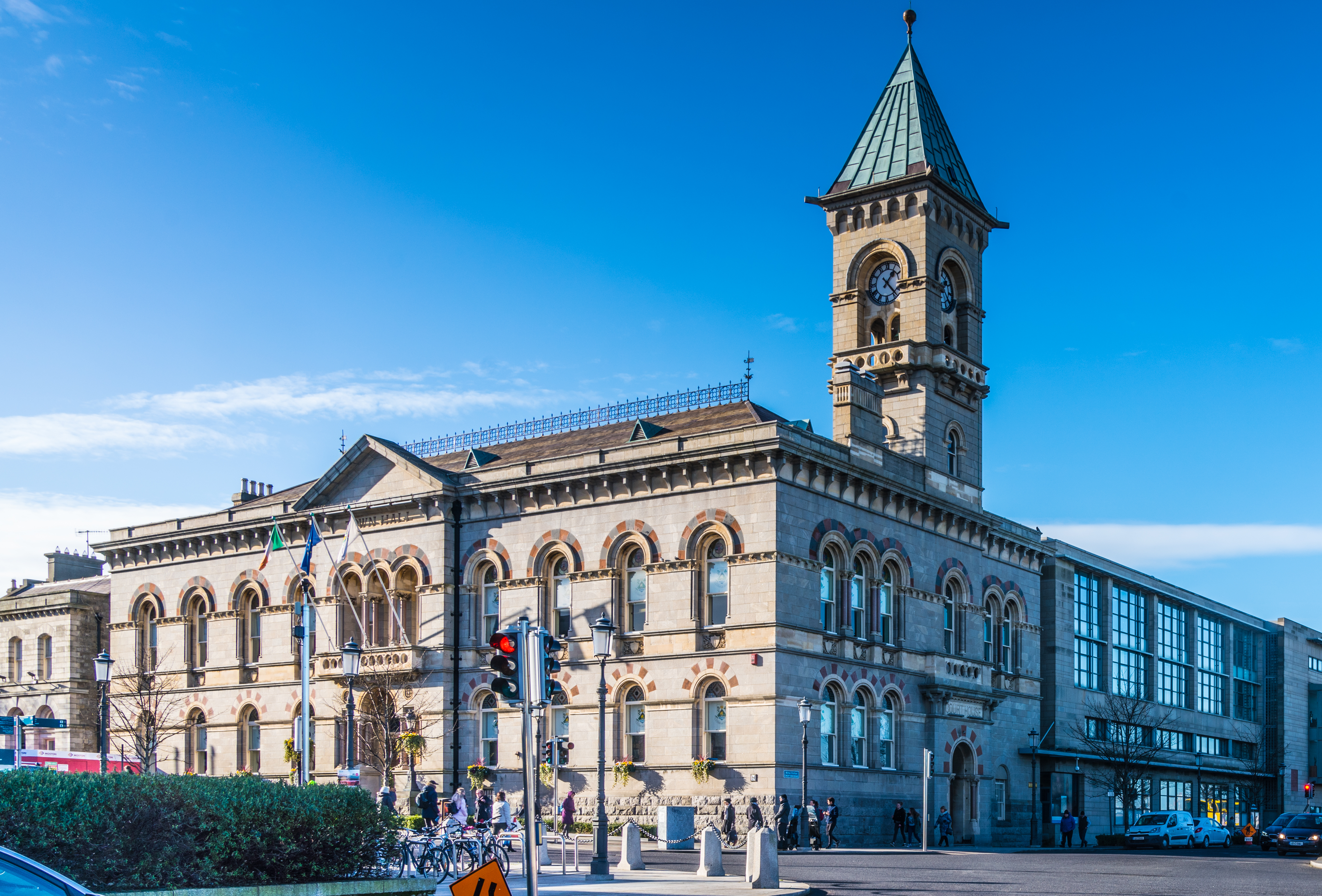
County Hall, seat of Dún Laoghaire–Rathdown County Council

Under the Local Government (Ireland) Act 1898, the township of Kingstown became an urban district in 1899. It was renamed Dún Laoghaire in 1920. The urban district of Dún Laoghaire was abolished in 1930, with its area becoming the core of the borough of Dún Laoghaire. The borough was abolished in 1994, on the establishment of the county of Dún Laoghaire–Rathdown.

Until 2013, Dún Laoghaire remained the only town in Ireland to have its own Vocational Education Committee.

The area is governed by Dún Laoghaire–Rathdown County Council which is based at County Hall and is responsible for the provision of local services and amenities. For elections to the council, the town is part of the local electoral area of Dún Laoghaire which elects six councillors.

For elections to Dáil Éireann the town is part of the Dáil constituency of Dún Laoghaire.

== Population ==
In census reports, Dún Laoghaire is included within the urban area of Dublin City and its suburbs. Figures are also given for 11 electoral divisions (EDs) in the Dún Laoghaire area, which includes some of the neighbouring suburbs. The areas of the EDs were defined in 1986.

Population by electoral division
Electoral division	2006	2011	2016	2022
Dún Laoghaire-East Central	1,855	2,234	2,489	2,604
Dún Laoghaire-Glasthule	2,634	2,760	2,807	2,982
Dún Laoghaire-Glenageary	1,992	1,922	1,929	4,516
Dún Laoghaire-Monkstown Farm	1,975	2,095	2,225	2,321
Dún Laoghaire-Mount Town	1,608	1,734	1,779	1,915
Dún Laoghaire-Sallynoggin East	2,917	2,866	2,860	2,941
Dún Laoghaire-Sallynoggin South	1,384	1,354	1,441	1,434
Dún Laoghaire-Sallynoggin West	1,982	1,884	2,886	4,354
Dún Laoghaire-Salthill	1,708	1,623	1,729	1,758
Dún Laoghaire-Sandycove	3,734	3,690	3,690	3,688
Dún Laoghaire-West Central	2,029	2,368	2,690	2,726
Total	23818	24530	26525	31239

=== Historical population ===
Historical populations
Year	Pop.	±%
1821	1,505	—
1831	5,736	+281.1%
1841	7,229	+26.0%
1851	10,458	+44.7%
1861	12,469	+19.2%
1871	16,378	+31.3%
1881	18,586	+13.5%
1891	17,352	−6.6%
1901	17,377	+0.1%
1911	16,941	−2.5%
1926	18,987	+12.1%

Prior to 1930, census reports gave the population of the town (later defined as an urban district). In census reports from 1931 to 1991, figures were given for the borough of Dún Laoghaire, which includes a larger area extending from Blackrock to Killiney along the southern coast of County Dublin.

== Town twinning ==
Dún Laoghaire has a town twinning relationship with the following cities.

- France: Brest
- Japan: Izumo
- United Kingdom: Holyhead

== See also ==
- Kingstown Lifeboat Disaster
- List of towns and villages in Ireland
- List of RNLI stations
