= Takayu Onsen =

Hot spring resort in Fukushima Prefecture, Japan

Takayu Onsen 高湯温泉
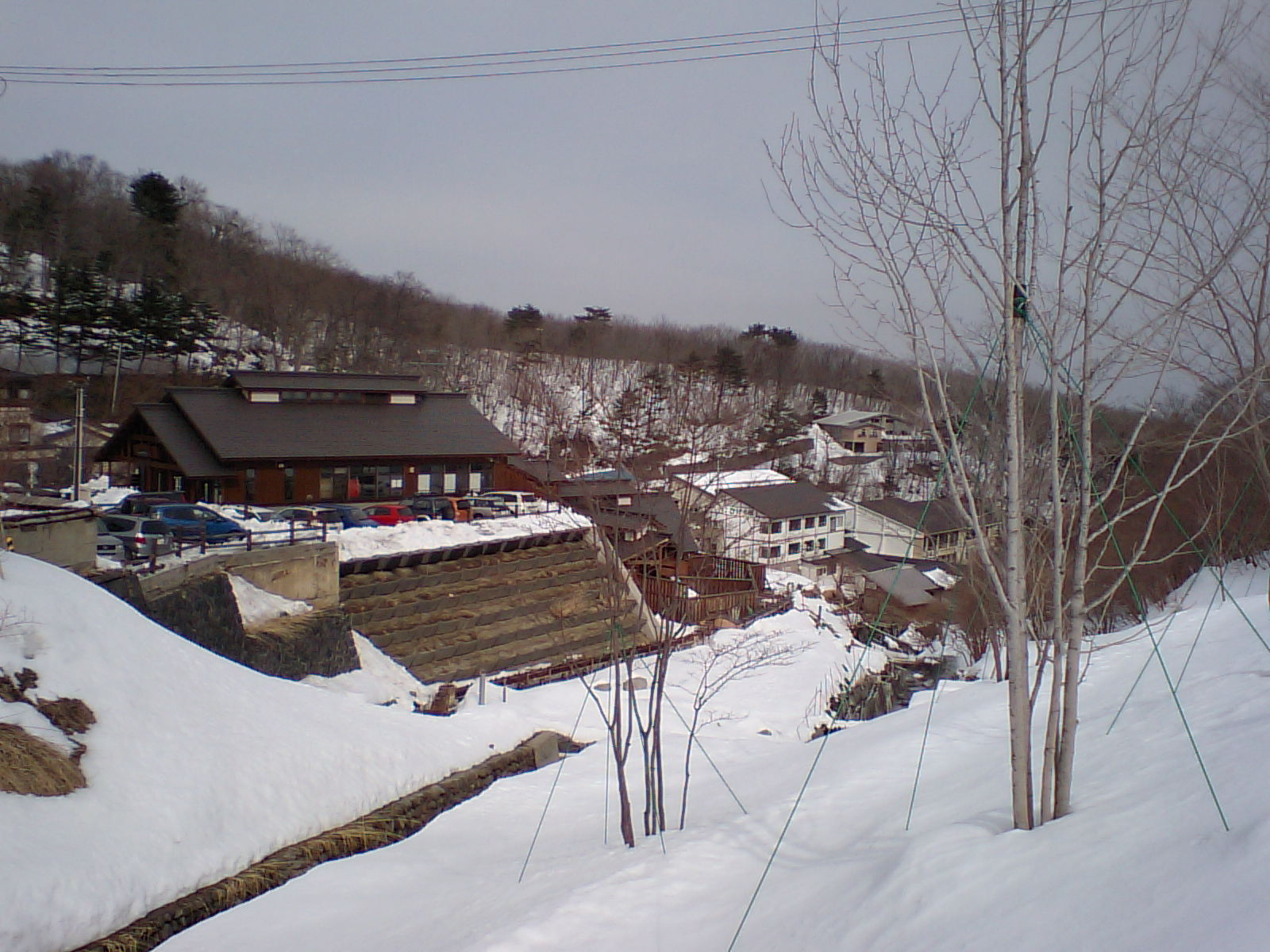
- Takayu Onsen in winter

- Location within Fukushima Prefecture Location within Japan
- Interactive map of Takayu Onsen 高湯温泉
- Location: Fukushima, Fukushima, Japan
- Coordinates: 37°45′09″N 140°18′17″E
- Elevation: 750 m (2,460 ft)
- Type: sulfur
- Temperature: 50.5 deg C

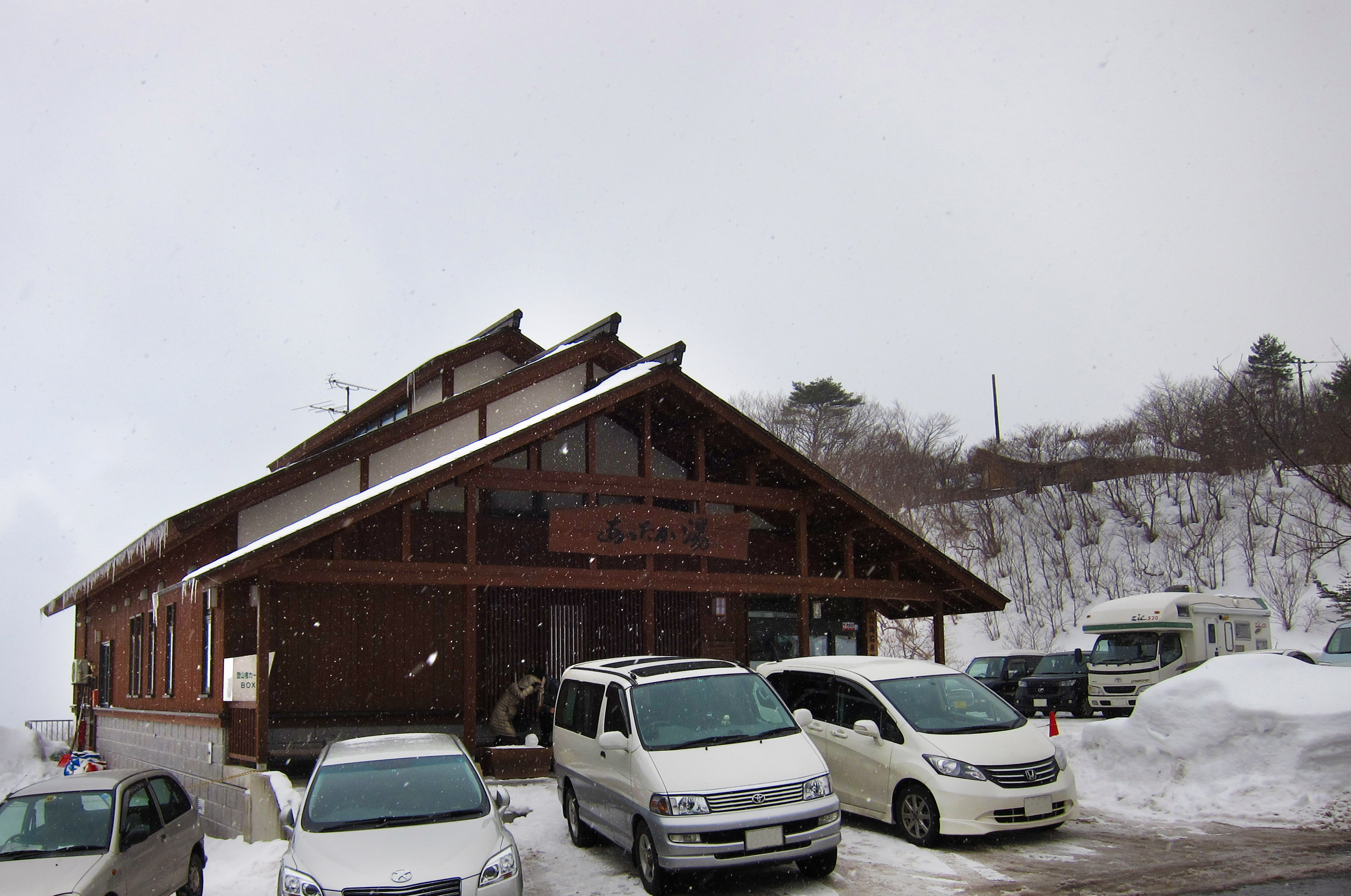
Attakau-yu, bathing facilities operated by the Takayu Onsen Ryōkan Association

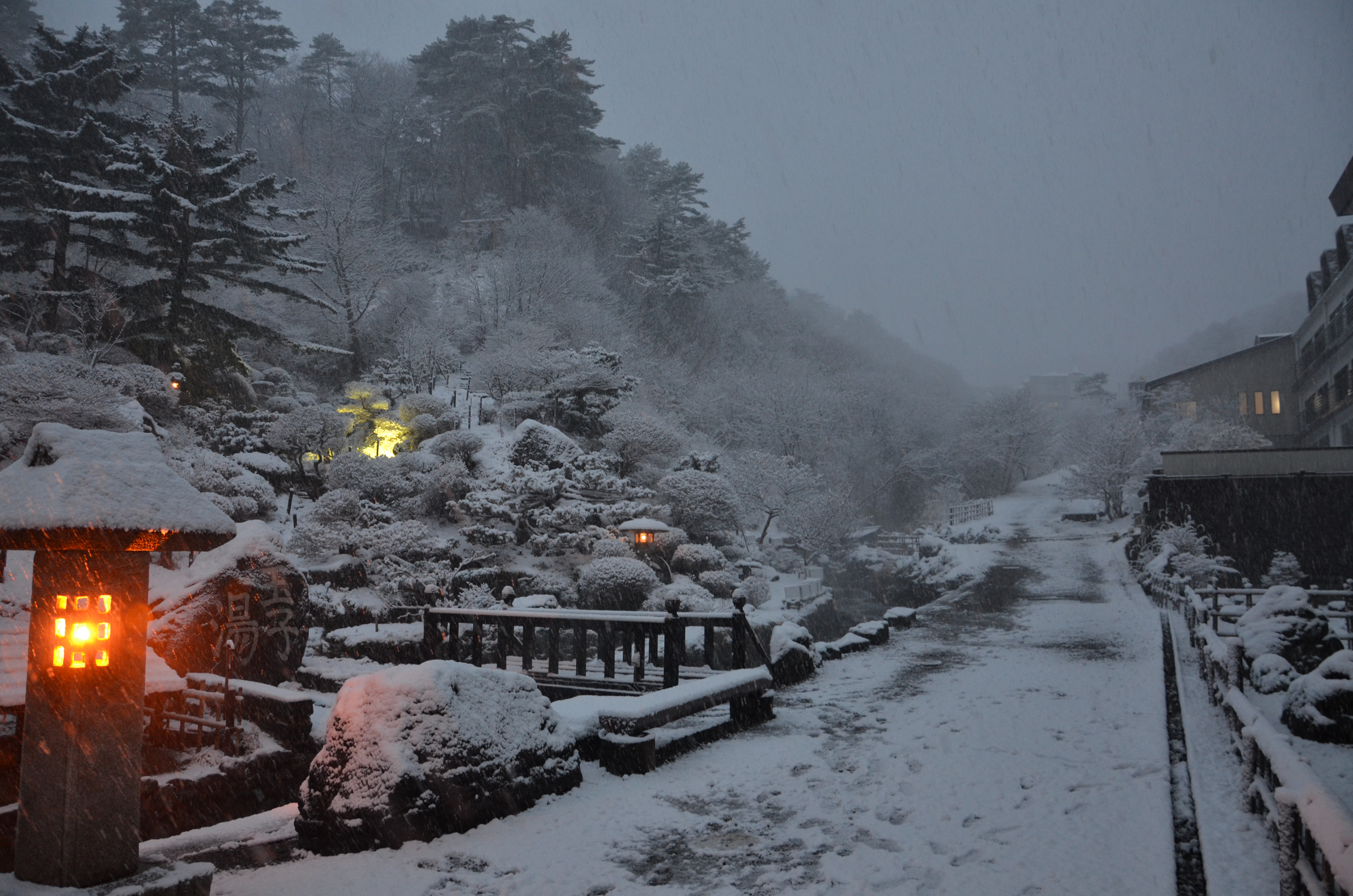

Takayu Onsen (高湯温泉) is a hot spring resort in the Zainiwasaka district of the city of Fukushima, Fukushima, Japan. It is in the mountains about 14 km west of Fukushima Station.

== Description ==
Takayu Onsen is halfway up the slopes of Mount Azuma, near the entrance to the Bandai-Azuma Skyline sightseeing road, due west of the centre of Fukushima city.

The thermal springs were originally developed 400 years ago in the Sengoku period. The onsen town has approximately 12 ryokan. The soaking pools and baths are open to guests using the lodging as well as non-staying guests (who pay a small fee for use of the bathhouses.) The historic Tamagoyu bathhouse, is the most well-known. It consists of a small wooden bathhouse with separate soaking pools for each gender. The Attaka no Yu bathhouse is public, rather than private. In the center of town there is a free outdoor foot bath.

== Water profile ==
The hot mineral water issues from ten spring sources distributed around the onsen town. The water has high levels of hydrogen sulfide, and is considered to be strongly acidic. These qualities affect the clarity of the water, which is tinged a slightly milky blue color. The hydrogen sulphide gas gives the springs a "rotten egg" odor. Several of the local ryokans pipe the water in its unadulterated state into their soaking pools and baths to maintain the integrity of the source.

== Access ==
=== By car ===
From the east, Takayu can be reached from Fukushima, taking Fukushima Prefectural Route 70 west.

Access from the west is via the Bandai-Azuma Skyline (a toll-free road).

=== By bus ===
Fukushima Transportation buses to Takayu leave from the east exit of Fukushima Station and terminate at Highland-mae (ハイランド前).
