= Eastern Suburbs =

Eastern Suburbs may refer to:

== Places ==
- Eastern Suburbs (Mumbai), India
- Eastern Suburbs (Sydney), Australia
  - Eastern Suburbs railway line, Sydney, Australia

== Sports clubs ==
Association football

- Eastern Suburbs AFC, Auckland, New Zealand
- Eastern Suburbs F.C., Brisbane, Australia
- Hakoah Sydney City East FC, formerly called Eastern Suburbs, Sydney, Australia

Cricket

- Eastern Suburbs Cricket Club, Sydney, Australia

Rugby league

- Eastern Suburbs RLFC, the previous name of the Sydney Roosters
- Eastern Suburbs Tigers, the previous name of the Brisbane Tigers

Rugby union

- Eastern Suburbs RUFC, Sydney, Australia
- Eastern Suburbs RUFC (Canberra), Australia
- Eastern Suburbs RUFC (Tasmania), Australia
- Easts Tigers Rugby Union, Brisbane, Australia

== See also ==
- Easts (disambiguation)
