= Easts =

Easts may refer to:

- Sydney Roosters, an Australian rugby league football team in the NRL, formerly known as "Eastern Suburbs" or "Easts" for short.
- Eastern Suburbs Tigers, an Australian rugby league football club
- Eastern Suburbs AFC, a New Zealand Association Football (soccer) club
- Easts Tigers Rugby Union, a rugby union club in Brisbane, Queensland, Australia

== See also ==
- Eastern Suburbs (disambiguation)
- East (disambiguation)
