= Michael Warren (sculptor) =

Irish sculptor (1950–2025)

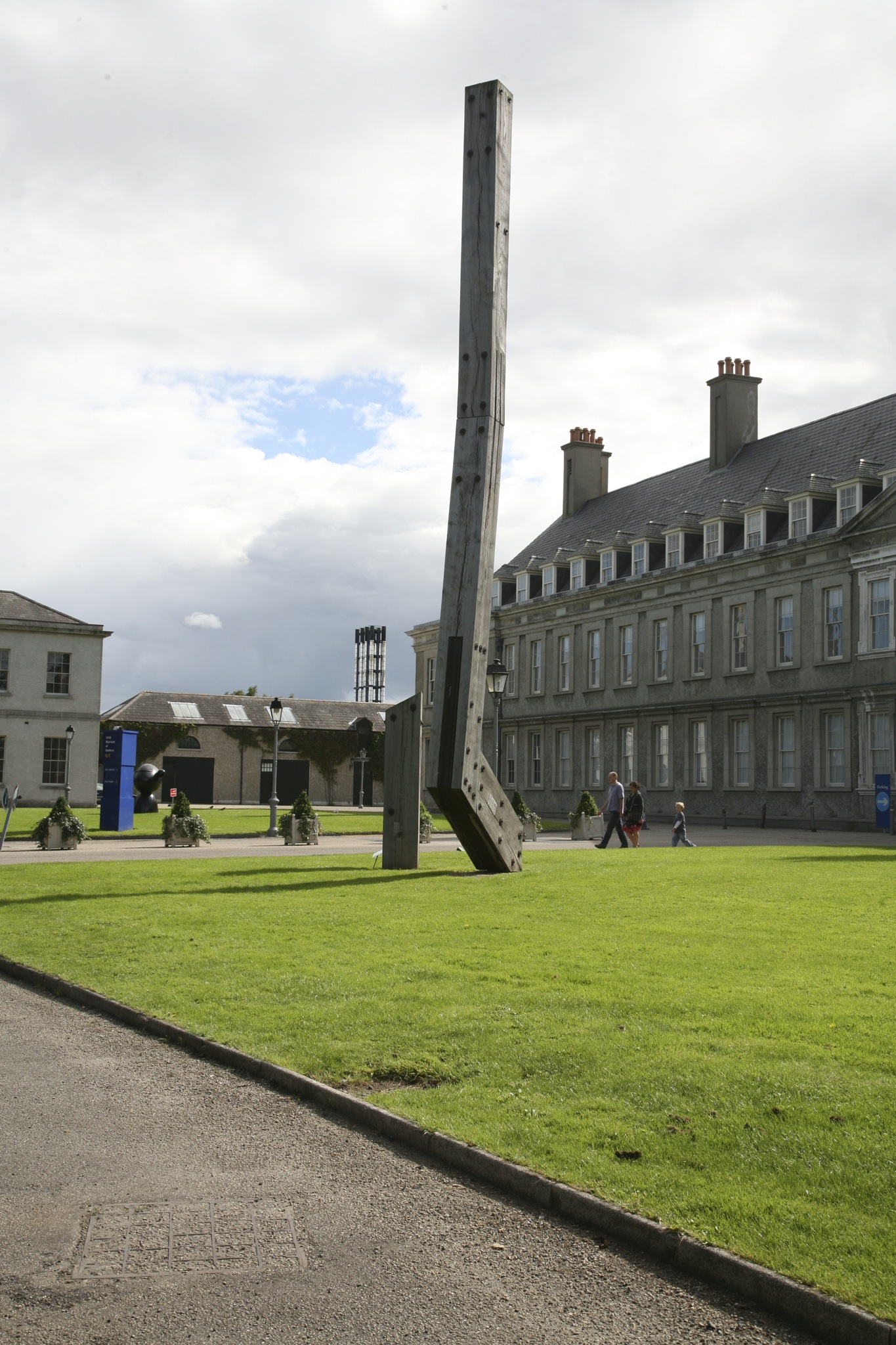
Beneath the bow, 1991; Irish Museum of Modern Art, Dublin

Michael Warren (1950 – 10 July 2025) was an Irish sculptor who produced site-specific public art.

Warren was born in 1950 in Gorey, County Wexford, Ireland. Inspired by Oisín Kelly, his art teacher at St Columba's College, Michael Warren studied at Bath Academy of Art, at Trinity College Dublin and, from 1971 to 1975, at the Accademia di Brera in Milan. He last lived and worked in Co. Wexford.

He had a number of very visible works in Ireland, including the large sweeping wood sculpture in front of the Dublin Civic Offices. Wood Quay, where the civic offices stand, was the centre of Viking Dublin and the sculpture evokes the form, and the powerful grace, of a Viking ship. It also reflects vertically the horizontal sweep of the nearby Liffey as it enters its bay. A complex balance of meanings matching a delicate, though massive, balance of substance is typical of his work. Warren himself described the useful ambiguity of abstraction (Hill 1998).

With Roland Tallon he created Tulach a' tSolais (Mound of Light), a memorial to the 1798 rebellion at Oulart Hill, County Wexford. Here, a room was hollowed out of a small hill; the room contains two abstract curved oak forms and is illuminated by natural light falling through a long slot in its ceiling and walls. Despite the unusual and abstract constitution of this memorial and despite the fraught political resonance of the rebellion, Tulach a' tSolais is popular and something of a local attraction. His Gateway in Dún Laoghaire was less popular with some local people and it was eventually removed and returned to the artist.

At the northern entrance to the village of Leighlinbridge, County Carlow, is a sculpture by Michael Warren, depicting the thrones of the ancient seat of the Kings of South Leinster at Dinn Righ (The hill of the Kings). The Kings of Leinster lived near the village.

He died on 10 July 2025.

== Work on display ==
- Cloch na gCoillte (2013) Clonakilty, County Cork, Ireland
- Unbroken Line (2013) Dublin Castle, Dublin, Ireland
- Antaeus II (2010) Scott Cottage, Rossdohan, County Kerry, Ireland
- Janus (2010) Western Gate Building, University College Cork, Cork, Ireland
- M-7 23, homage to Eileen Gray II (2010) Department of Environment, Wexford, Ireland
- Stele for Thomas Wyse (2009) Waterford Institute of Technology, Waterford, Ireland
- Obelisk (2009) Battle of the Boyne Visitor Centre, Oldbridge Estate, County Meath, Ireland
- Lieu de Rencontre (2008) Dar Sabre, Marrakech, Morocco
- M-7 23 (2008) Expo 2008, Zaragoza, Spain
- Wave Form (2008) No1 Warrington Place, Dublin, Ireland
- Reliquery (2007) St Dominic's College, Cabra, Dublin, Ireland
- Go deo, homage to Samuel Beckett, Trinity College Dublin, Ireland
- Em Louvor dos Limites (2005) Carrazeda de Ansiães, Portugal
- No Pasaran (2004) the Mall, Waterford, Ireland
- Amor Fati (2003) Jiaobanshan Park, Taoyuan, Taiwan
- Bronze Arch (2003) Gongju, Korea
- Her Hair (II) (2003) Courtown Harbour, County Wexford, Ireland
- Gateway (2002) Dún Laoghaire, County Dublin, Ireland
- East Point (2001) East Point, Dublin, Ireland
- Pasqua (III) (2001) University of Valencia, Spain
- Ceatharloch (2001) Carlow, Ireland
- Millennium Sculpture (2001) Radió Telefís Éireann, Dublin, Ireland
- Dolmen (2000) Irish Management Institute, Dublin, Ireland
- Almanac (2000) Royal Victoria Hospital, Belfast, Northern Ireland
- Tulach a’ tSolais (1999) Oulart Hill, County Wexford, Ireland
- Atlanticus (1999) County Buildings, Galway, Ireland
- Pasqua (II) (1999) A&L Goodbody HQ, International Financial Services Centre, Dublin, Ireland
- El Arado y las Estrellas (1998) Metropolitan Park, Quito, Ecuador
- Antaeus (1998), Devil's Glen, County Wicklow, Ireland
- Chi (III) (1998) Rathdown School, Dún Laoghaire, County Dublin, Ireland
- Her Hair (1997) East Point, Dublin, Ireland
- Hors les murs (1996) Clermont-Ferrand, France
- Trade Winds (1996) Santo Tirso, Portugal
- Ophelia (1st version) (1995) Dieudonné, Oise, France
- Ophelia (2nd version) (1995) Castlelough, County Clare, Ireland
- Alizes et tortues (1994) Lamentin, Guadeloupe, French West Indies
- Wood Quay (1994) Civic Offices, Dublin, Ireland
- Eena-Meena-Mina-Mo (1993) Farnsworth House, Plano, Illinois, USA
- Salmon Fall (1993) University of Limerick, Limerick, Ireland
- Living Relic (1993) Dunleer, County Louth, Ireland
- A Full Moon in March (1992) Minamikata, Japan
- Elegy to Light (1992) island of Thassos, Greece
- Pagan Place (1991) Encamp, Principality of Andorra
- Chi (1991) Allied Dunbar, Swindon, England
- Throughway (1991) University College Dublin, Ireland
- Beneath the ’bow (1991) Irish Museum of Modern Art, Dublin, Ireland
- Chi (1990) Oloron Sainte-Marie, France
- Journey Inland (1990) Campo de las Naciones, Madrid, Spain
- Thrones (1989) Hakone Open Air Museum, Japan
- Bio-dynamics (1989) Conrad Hotel, Dublin, Ireland
- Antigone (1988) Olympic Sculpture Park, Seoul, Korea
- De-creation (VI) (1987) Ferrybank, Wexford, Ireland
- Timber Construction for Plano (1986) Farnsworth House, Plano, Illinois, USA
- After Image (1986) Castletown Cox, County Kilkenny, Ireland
- Thrones (1986) Leighlinbridge, County Carlow, Ireland
- Countermovement (1985) Trinity College Dublin, Ireland
- Void Anchored (1985) Kilkenny Castle, Kilkenny, Ireland
- Escultura Blanca (1985) Jeddah, Saudi Arabia
- Articulation of Void (1985) Jeddah, Saudi Arabia
- Broken Obelisk (1985) Foxrock, County Dublin, Ireland
- Chi (I) (1984) Ulster Museum, Belfast, Northern Ireland
- Family (1983) Gilbey's of Ireland, Dublin, Ireland
- Noche Oscura (1981) Dublin Port & Docks Board, Dublin, Ireland
- De-creation (V) (1978) Radió Telefís Éireann, Dublin, Ireland
