= People's Park, Dún Laoghaire =

Small semi-formal park, Dún Laoghaire, County Dublin, Ireland

People's Park
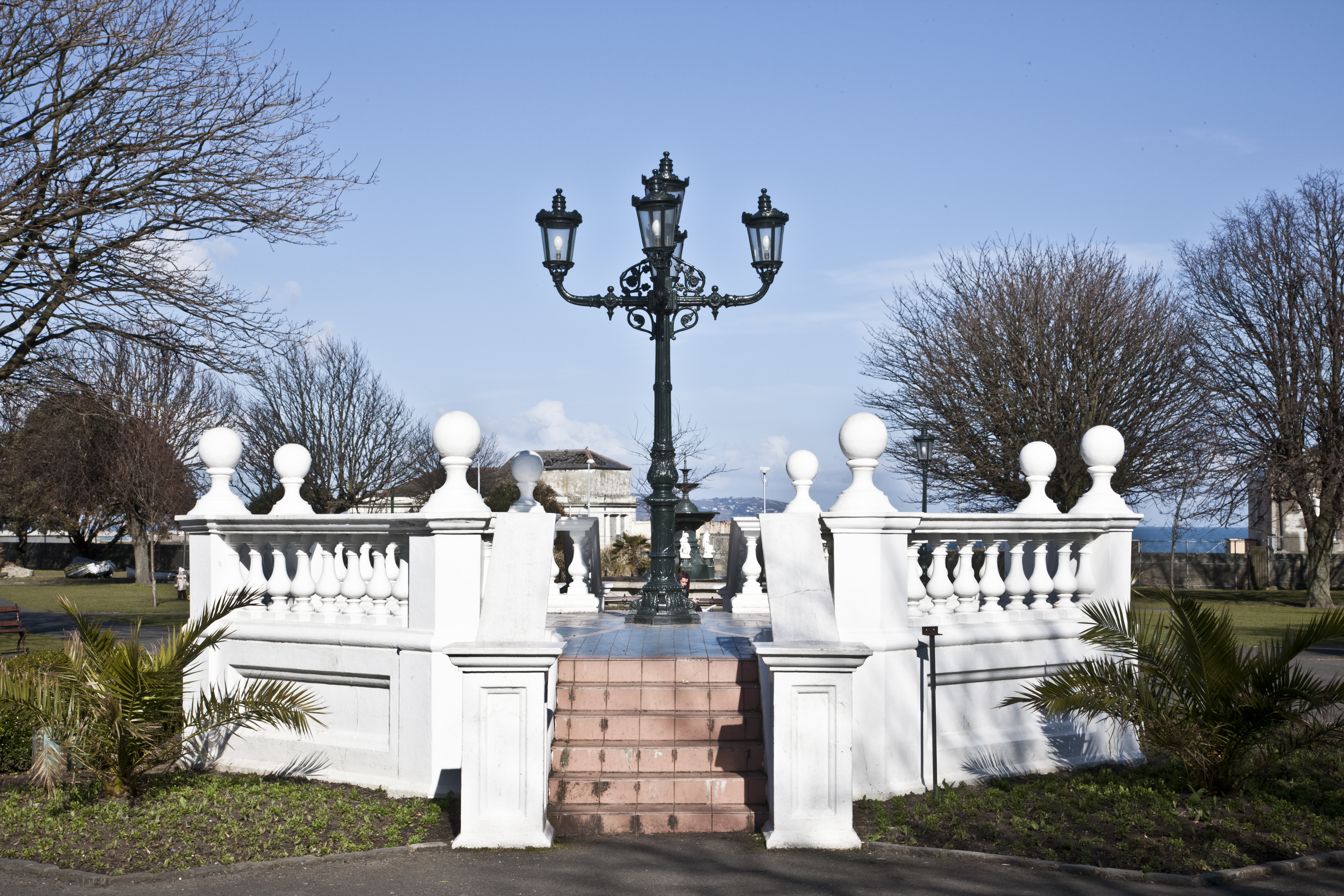
- Lamps in the People's Park

- Location within Dublin Location within Ireland
- Type: Municipal
- Location: Dún Laoghaire, County Dublin, Ireland
- Coordinates: 53.289863°N 6.128735°W
- Area: 1.6 hectares (4 acres)
- Created: 29 September 1890
- Operator: Dún Laoghaire–Rathdown County Council
- Status: Open all year, approximately daylight hours
- Website: www.dlrcoco.ie

The People's Park is a small public park in the suburban town of Dún Laoghaire in County Dublin, Ireland. Located near the East Pier of Dún Laoghaire Harbour and Glasthule, it opened in 1890, and major elements were redeveloped between 1985 and 1997, and again in 2012.

== History ==
A Martello Tower was previously situated on the site in 1805, as visible on maps from 1817 and 1821. The land was later a quarry, and was acquired by the Kingstown Town Commission in 1889. The park was designed by J. L. Robinson, an architect who was chairman of the Town Commissioners, and also designed other local civic buildings. Funding was partly provided by the Local Government Board.

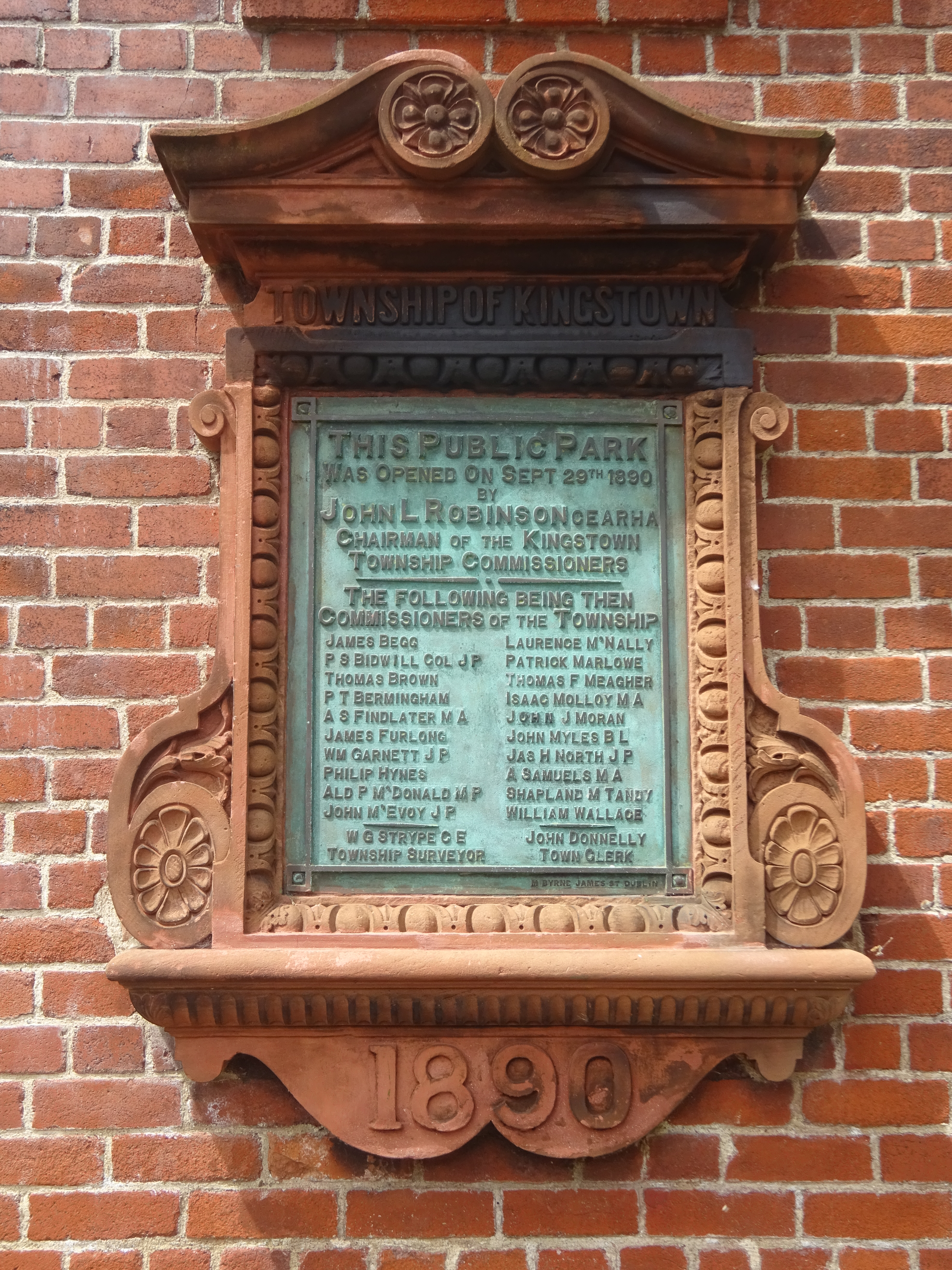
Plaque marking the park's opening.

The park was officially opened on 29 September 1890. A revised system of pathways, which replaced a more formal layout, was in place by 1937.

The fountains were restored in 1985 and 1988, a new playground also being constructed in 1988. The bandstand and shelter were reworked in 1990, and the park re-dedicated in September of that year.

In the early 2010s, under the direction of Leslie Moore, Senior Parks Superintendent, the pavements in the park were reconstructed in a more formal arrangement to reflect the original design intention. The gate lodge and shelter structures were conserved, public toilets constructed and an extension was added to the shelter to create tearooms, designed by Howley Hayes, conservation architects. New railings and gates were constructed along the line of 'the metals' and the raised promenade and glazed viewing deck were constructed over the DART line, designed by the in-house parks team. This work was completed in 2012.

== Location and access ==
The park is approximately 1.6 hectares (4.0 acres) in size and is bounded by Summerhill Road, Park Road, the DART railway cutting (the nearest railway station is Sandycove and Glasthule), and the rear gardens of some houses on Martello Terrace. The formal entrance is at the point where Upper George's Street becomes Summerhill Road, and Park Road goes towards the coast, and the second entrance is where Park Road meets Marine Terrace at Queen's Road.

== Amenities ==
The gate lodge is at the entrance at the junction of Upper Georges Street, Park Road and Summerhill Road. A bandstand is at the centre of the park, and it also holds a playground, two fountains, a "tearooms" style café in the Victorian shelter, and a Garden for the Blind (with a specially designed walking trail).

Sunday Markets are held on Sundays except that nearest to Christmas throughout the year.
