= Sailing in Dublin Club =

Club logo

The 'Sailing in Dublin Club' (SID) is a voluntary run yacht and dinghy club based in Dún Laoghaire harbour, Dún Laoghaire–Rathdown, County Dublin, Ireland. The club was founded in 1984 to promote sailing by providing shared ownership of boats. Classes sailed include Beneteau 31.7, Ruffian 23, Fireball and Laser Vago. The club cruising yacht is a Jeanneau Sun Odyssey 35.
