= Pavilion Theatre, Dún Laoghaire =

Facility in Dún Laoghaire, Ireland

Pavilion Theatre

- Location within Dublin Location within Ireland
- Former names: Pavilion & Gardens Kingstown
- Address: Marine Road
- Location: Dún Laoghaire, Dún Laoghaire–Rathdown, Republic of Ireland
- Coordinates: 53.294013°N 6.133716°W
- Capacity: 324
- Public transit: Dún Laoghaire railway station Dun Laoghaire, Royal Marine Road bus stop (Dublin Bus routes 45A/B, 59, 111)

Website
- paviliontheatre.ie

Pavilion Theatre (Irish: Amharclann an Phailliúin) is a theatre, cinema and arts centre in Dún Laoghaire, County Dublin, Ireland.

== History ==
Pavilion Theatre was founded in 1903, under the name of the Pavilion & Gardens Kingstown Ltd., with a stage measuring 83 × 24 feet (25 × 7 m). John McCormack performed in 1908. In 1915 the Pavilion burned down. By the 1930s it was only a cinema, with no plays being shown. In 1940 it burned down again. The introduction of television led to a decline, and the last film shown for a long time was No Sex Please, We're British in 1974. In the 1980s, Planxty recorded two programmes for RTÉ at the Pavilion, and acts such as De Dannan, The Dubliners and the Dublin Ballet Company also performed at the venue.

The Pavilion was closed in 1984 as a result of the enforcement of new fire regulations introduced with the Fire Acts of 1981 and 1982, and reopened in 2001 as a new 324-seat building. It is operated by Pavilion Theatre Management Company and owned by Dún Laoghaire–Rathdown County Council. It employs six full-time and 12 casual staff.
