= Mount Azuma-kofuji =

Active stratovolcano in Fukushima Prefecture, Japan

Mount Azuma
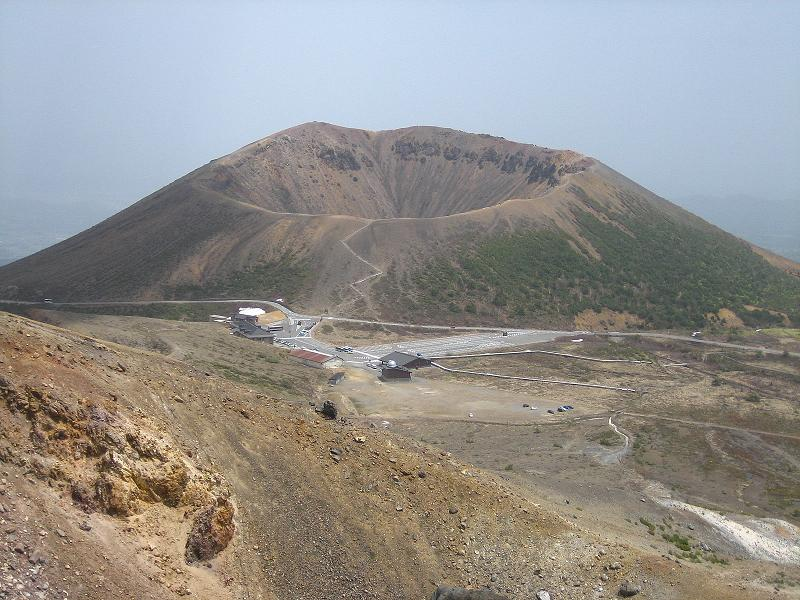
- Kofuji Crater of Azuma Volcano

Highest point
- Elevation: 1,705 m (5,594 ft)
- Listing: Volcanoes of Japan
- Coordinates: 37°43′20″N 140°15′49″E

Naming
- Native name: 吾妻山 (Japanese)

Geography
- Location within Fukushima Prefecture
- Location: Fukushima, Tōhoku region, Japan
- Parent range: Azuma Mountain Range

Geology
- Mountain type: Stratovolcano
- Volcanic arc: Northeastern Japan Arc
- Last eruption: December 1977

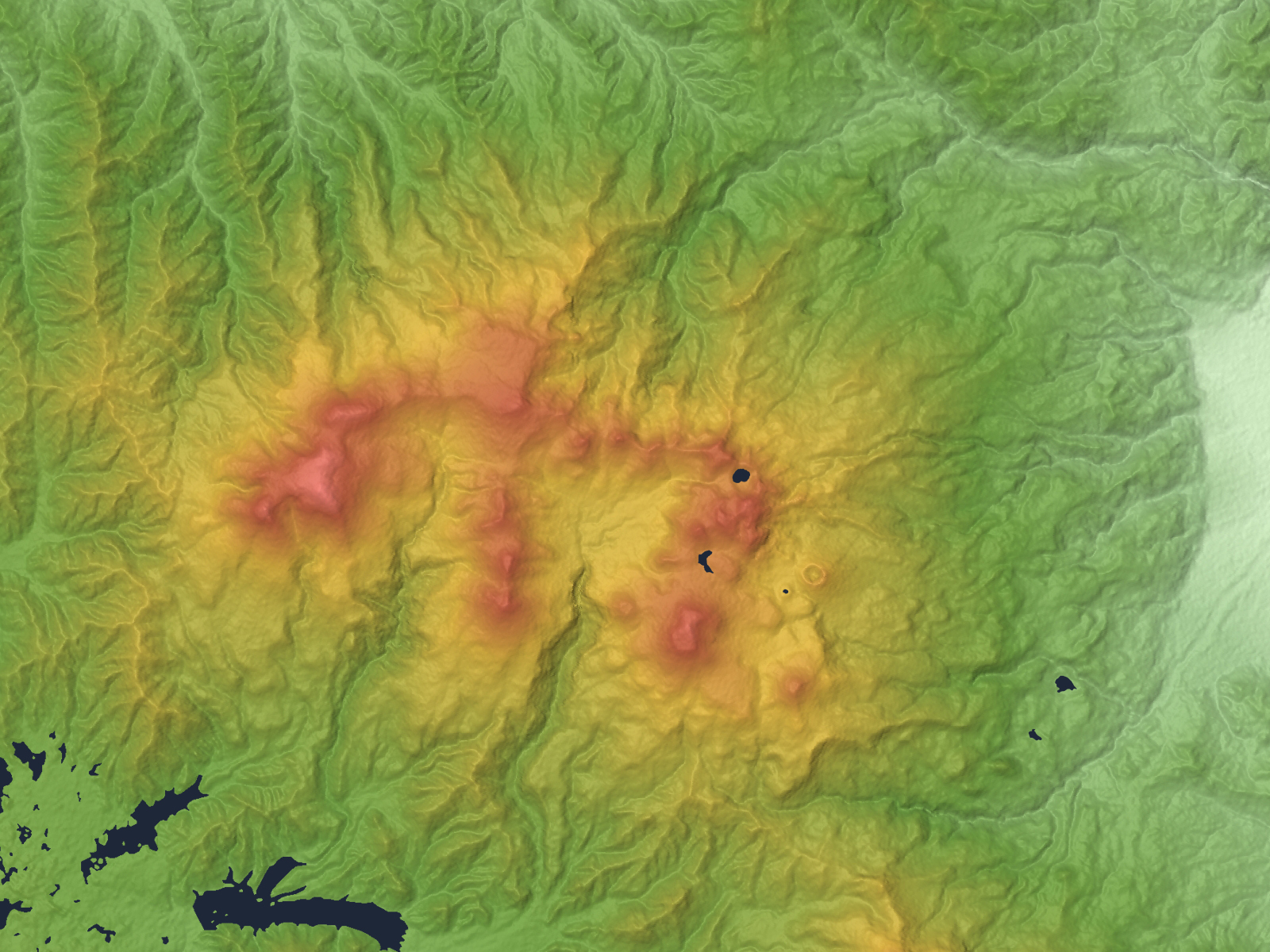
Azuma volcanic group

Mount Azuma-kofuji (吾妻小富士) is an active stratovolcano in Fukushima prefecture, Japan.

It has a conical-shaped crater and as the name "Kofuji" (small Mount Fuji) suggests, Mount Azuma is similar in shape to Mount Fuji. Mount Azuma's symmetrical crater and the nearby fumarolic area with its many onsen have made it a popular tourist destination.

The Bandai-Azuma Skyline passes just below the crater, allowing visitors to drive to within walking distance of the crater and other various hiking trails on the mountain. There is also a visitor center along the roadway near the crater, where a collection of eateries, facilities, a parking lot, and a stop for buses from Fukushima Station are located.

The Azuma volcanic group contains several volcanic lakes, including Goshiki-numa, the "Five Colored Lakes".

Each Spring, as the snow melts away, a white rabbit appears on the side of Mount Azuma. The melting snow shaped like a rabbit is known as the 'seeding rabbit' and signals to the people of Fukushima that the farming season has come.

== See also ==
- List of the 100 famous mountains in Japan
