= Higashi =

Higashi (Japanese: 東, lit. 'east') may refer to:

== Places in Japan ==
- Higashi, Shibuya
- Higashi, Fukushima
- Higashi, Okinawa
- Higashi-ku, Fukuoka
- Higashi-ku, Hiroshima
- Higashi-ku, Nagoya
- Higashi-ku, Sapporo

== People ==
- Keigo Higashi, Japanese footballer
- Kelly Higashi, American judge and lawyer
- Kotaro Higashi, Japanese footballer
- Satoru Higashi (東 悟; born 1963), Japanese boxer
- Shunki Higashi (東 俊希; born 2000), Japanese footballer
- Yōichi Higashi (東陽一; 1934–2026), Japanese film director
- Carlos Burella Higashi, Peruvian footballer

== Fictional characters ==
- Joe Higashi, in Fatal Fury
- Kotaro Higashi, an alter ego of Ultraman Taro
- Setsuna Higashi, in Fresh Pretty Cure!

== Other uses ==
- Higashi (food), Japanese confectionery

== See also ==
- Azuma (disambiguation) – the Japanese character for east is also pronounced azuma
- East (disambiguation)
