= East Point, Virginia =

Unincorporated community in Virginia, United States

Coordinates: 37°43′12″N 075°48′53″W

East Point is an unincorporated community in Accomack County, Virginia, United States.
