= East Point Business Park =

Campus in northern docklands of Dublin, Ireland

Coordinates: 53.357°N 6.226°W

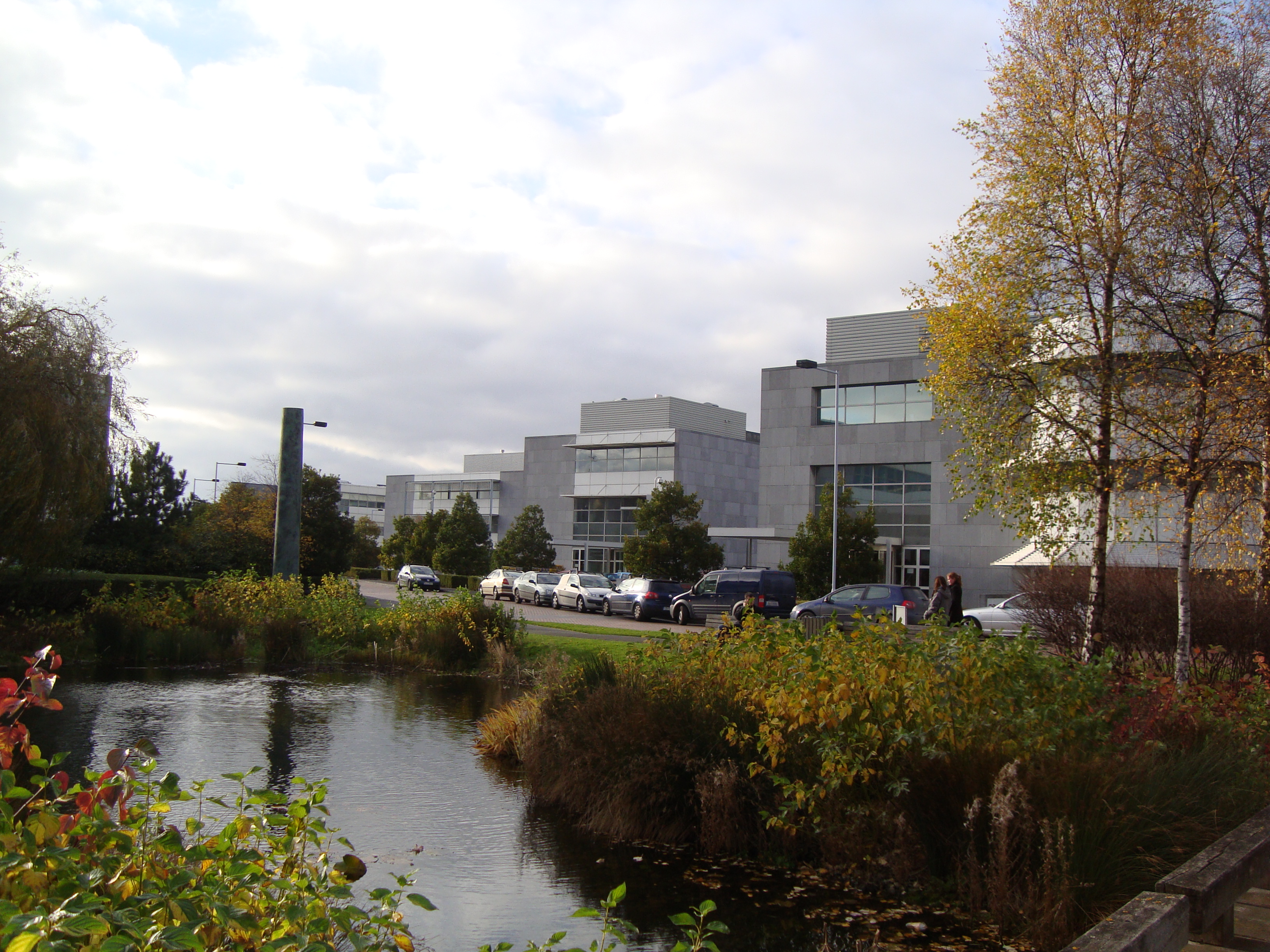
The pond at East Point Business Park

East Point Office Park (Irish: Gnó na Rinne Thoir) in the docklands area of Dublin, Ireland is one of the country's largest business parks, being the place of employment for thousands of people. It is situated in the East Wall area on reclaimed land.

== History ==
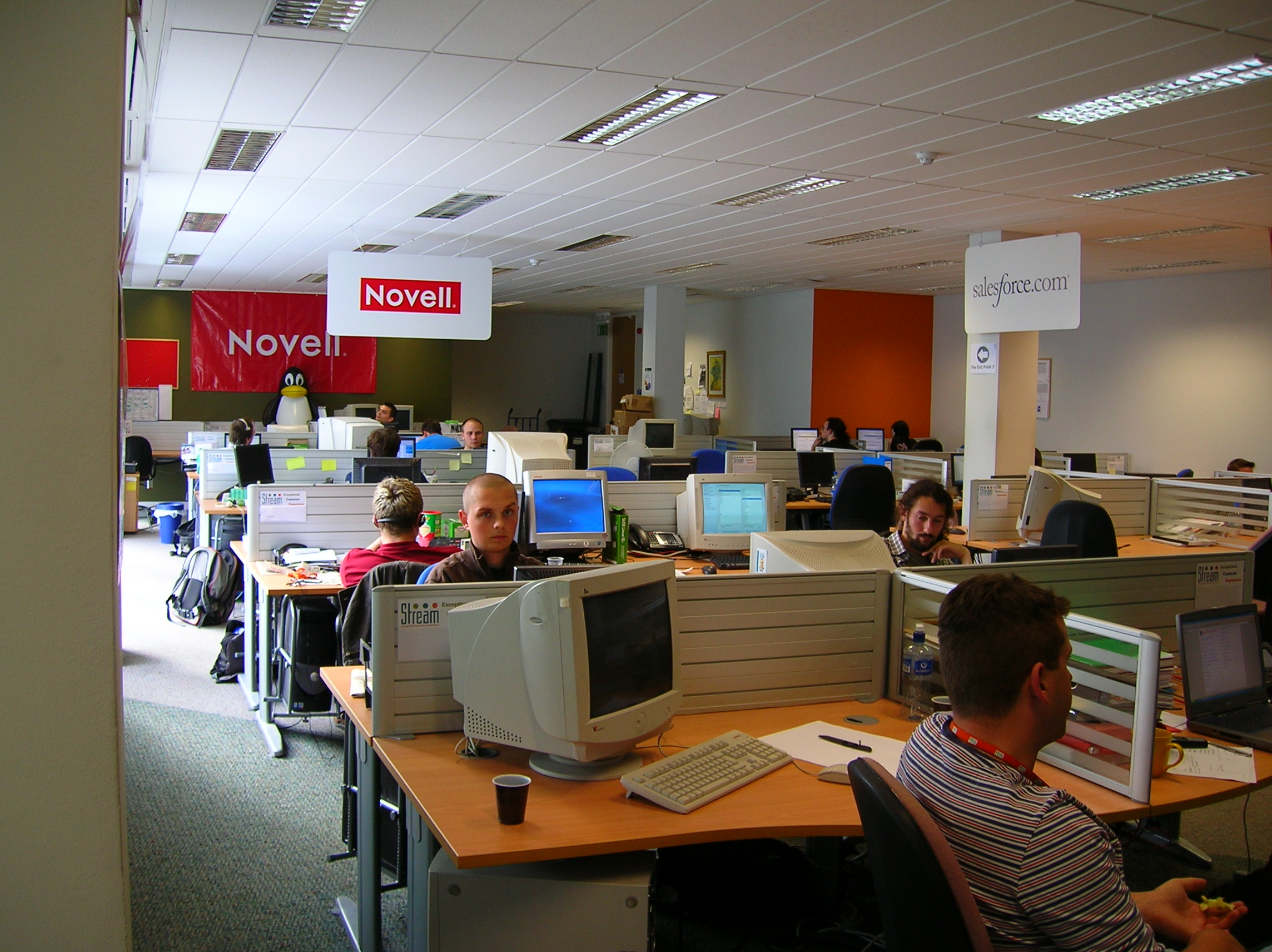
People working inside one of the buildings within East Point Business Park, July 2006

The park is situated on land reclaimed from Dublin Bay and the River Tolka estuary. The first phase of the park was opened for business around 1996. The site where EastPoint is located was intended to be a location for a new City Airport in Dublin, similar to London City Airport. When this plan ultimately proved impractical, the site was acquired by Earlsfort Centre Developments.

Earlsfort engaged Scott Tallon Walker to design the Park and the buildings and the landscaping was designed by Charles Funke. It became necessary, because of the route of the Dublin Port Tunnel, to construct a new bridge and causeway from Alfie Byrne Road to access the Park.

The success of the initial phase of EastPoint led to Earlsfort and Dublin Port Company entering a joint venture to develop a further phase. This brought the size of the Park to circa 40 acres (160,000 m^{2}) with circa 140,000 square meters (1.5 m square feet) of mainly offices in 37 buildings. This also provided a further entrance to the Park from Bond Road thus enhancing access from the South City.

== Location and transport ==
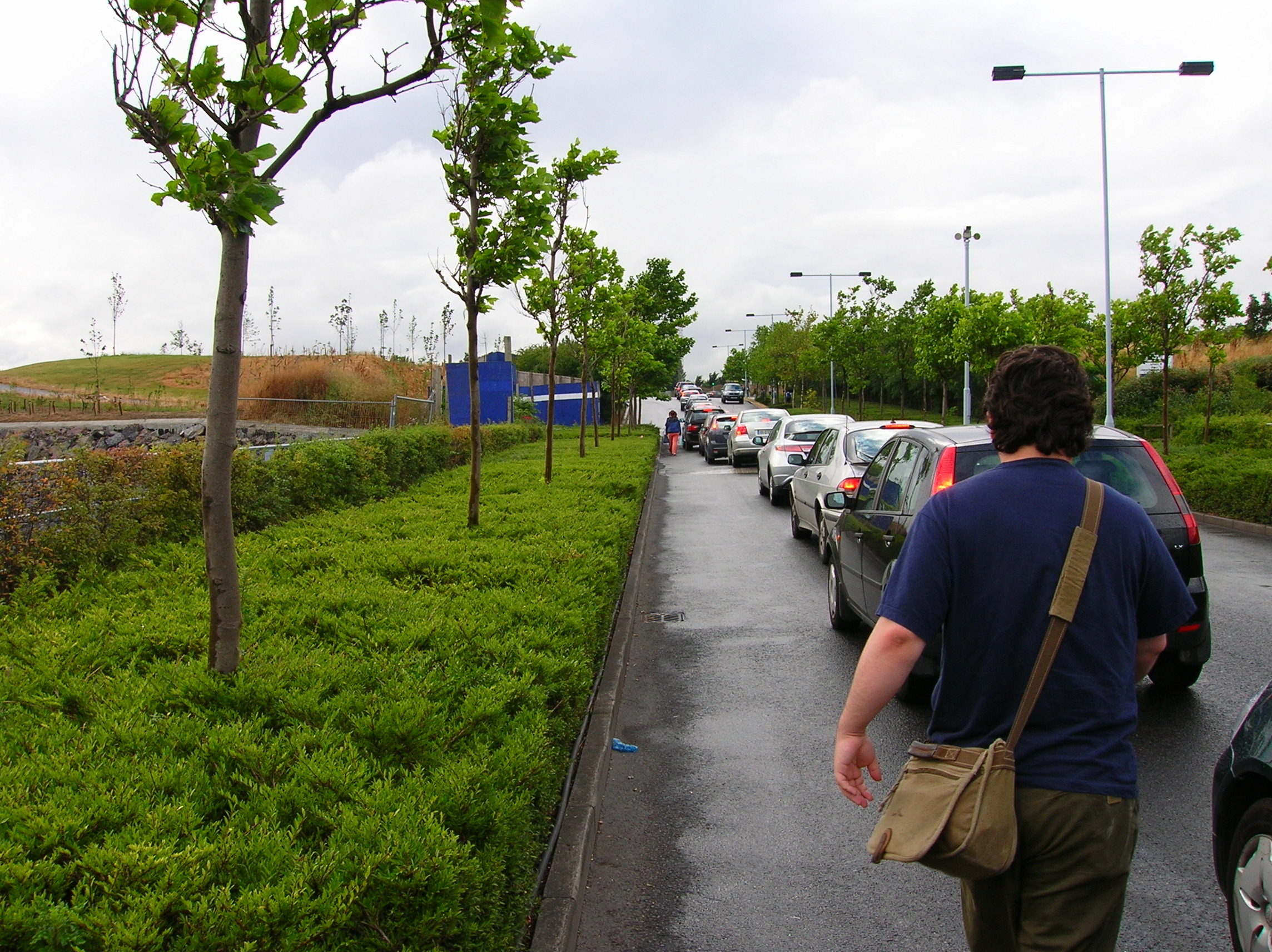
Road congestion leaving East Point Business Park, July 2006

EastPoint is Dublin's only central office park, located less than 2 kilometres from the International Financial Services Centre (IFSC), the purpose-built Convention Centre Dublin overlooking the River Liffey, and other landmarks such as the 3Arena (formerly known as The O2) venue at the Point Village.

The park is not served directly by any public transport. To alleviate this, a shuttle bus fleet provide free-of-charge service to Clontarf Road railway station during railway operating hours; and to near the Point Village stop on the Luas red line during peak hours.

== Major occupiers ==
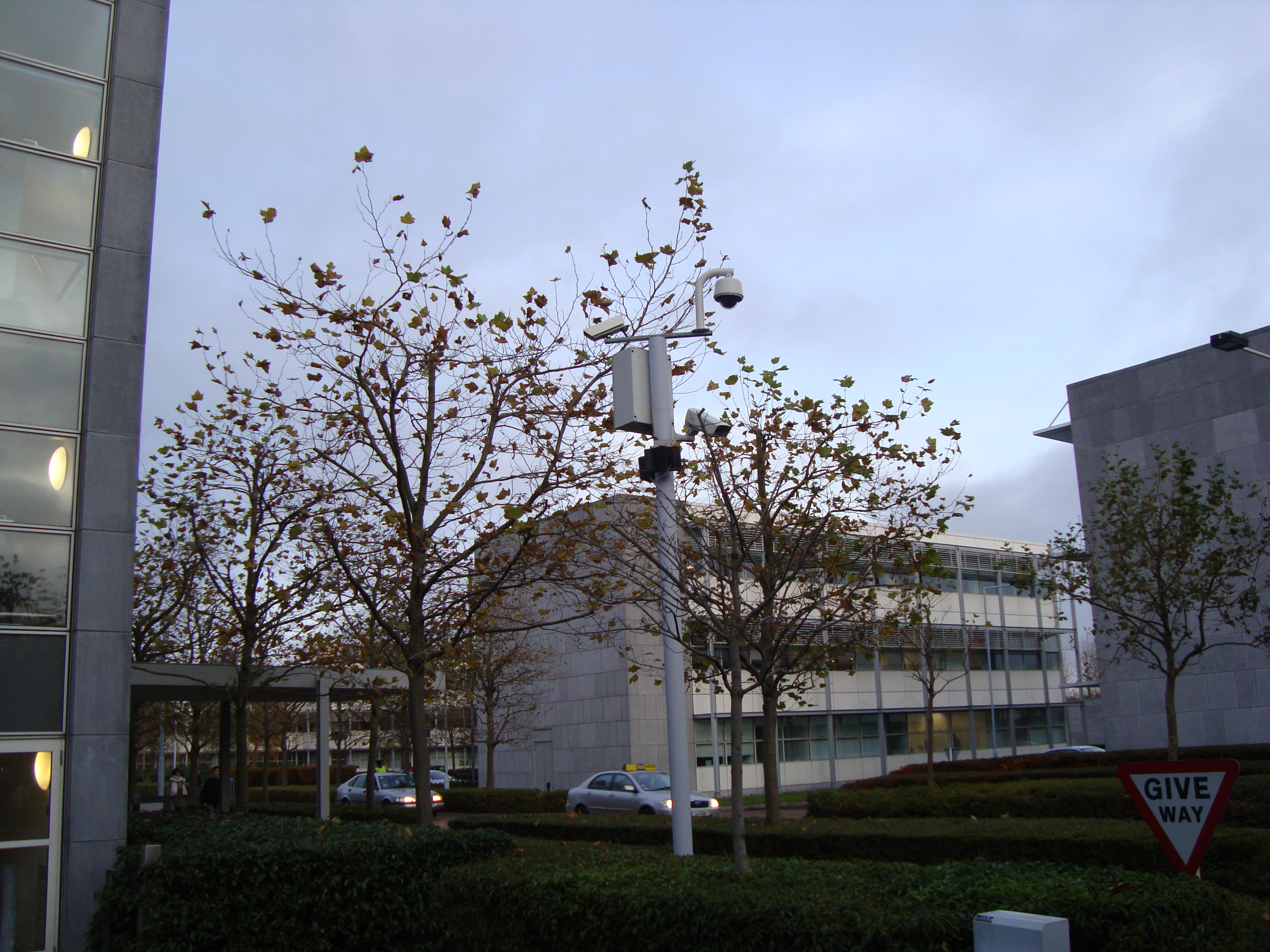
East Point Business Park in 2008, showing buildings housing left-to-right Eircom, Lexmark, and Oracle

Major companies based in East Point Office Park include Cisco, Google, Oracle, Enterprise Ireland, Deutsche Bank, Cloud Software Group, QuintilesIms, Ergo, FINEOS and Virgin Media Ireland.

Enterprise Ireland leased one of the buildings within the park to serve as its new head office, in a move aimed at merging its four Dublin offices together at one central location, from the end of 2007. EI announced their departure to 160 Townsend in the city centre in April 2026 in order to be closer to its government stakeholders and corporate clients.
