= List of public art in Belfast =

This is a list of public art on permanent public display in Belfast, Northern Ireland. The list applies only to works of public art accessible in a public space; it does not include artwork on display inside museums. Public art may include sculptures, statues, monuments, memorials, murals and mosaics. The murals of Belfast are discussed separately in Murals in Northern Ireland.

== City centre ==
Image	Title / subject	Location and coordinates	Date	Artist / designer	Type	Material	Designation	Wikidata	Notes
More images	Albert Memorial Clock, Belfast	Queen's Square	1870	W. J. Barre	Clock tower	Stone		Q2638495	
More images	Thanksgiving Square Beacon	Thanksgiving Square (Belfast)	2007	Andy Scott	Abstract sculpture	Metal		Q4876007	
More images	The Masts	Donegall Place	2011		8 masts	Copper			The eight copper clad lighting masts are named after White Star Line ships built at Harland and Wolff:- Titanic, Olympic, Oceanic, Britannic, Laurentic, Celtic, Nomadic, Traffic.
	James Larkin	Donegall Street Place	2006	Anto Brennan	sculpture	Bronze			
More images	The Big Fish	Donegall Quay	1999	John Kindness	Ceramic sculpture	Stone		Q4091869	
More images	"No Pasaran", Spanish Civil War memorial	Writers Square, Donegall Street	2007	Anto Brennan	Bust on pedestal	Bronze and stone			
More images	Monument to the Unknown Woman Worker	Great Victoria Street	1992	Louise Walsh	Sculpture group	Bronze		Q6906904	
More images	Spirit of Belfast	Arthur Square	2009	Dan George	Abstract sculpture	Steel		Q7577956	
More images	Sheep on the Road	Waterfront Hall, Lanyon Place	1990	Deborah Brown	Sculpture group	Bronze		Q7492438	Originally at Riddell Hall. Relocated to Waterfront Hall in 1999
	The Ulster Brewer	Lanyon place	1997	Ross Wilson	statue	bronze			Also known as 'The Barrel Man'
More images	The Speaker	Customs House Square		Gareth Knowles	Statue	Bronze			
More images	Henry Cooke	Wellington Place	1876	Samuel Ferris Lynn	Statue on pedestal	Bronze and stone			
More images	Renewal	Queen's Square		Ned Jackson Smyth	Abstract sculpture	Metal			
More images	Thomas Thompson memorial fountain	Bedford Street / Ormeau Avenue	1885	Young and McKenzie Architects	Fountain	Stone			
More images	The Buoys	York Street / Donegall Street	Pre 1979	Unknown	3 Buoys	Metal			Group of obsolete navigation buoys presented by the Commissioner of Irish Lights to Belfast City Council to highlight Belfast's maritime heritage.
More images	Rinty Monaghan	Cathedral Gardens	2015	Alan (Beattie) Herriot		bronze			
More images	Anne Sculpture	St. Anne's Square	2009	Lucy Glendinning					
	Alec the Goose	St George's Market	2009	Gordon Muir		Bronze			
More images	Sammy the Seal	Donegall Quay	2014	The Paul Hogarth Company		Bronze			

=== Belfast City Hall ===
Image	Title / subject	Location and coordinates	Date	Artist / designer	Type	Material	Designation	Wikidata	Notes
More images	The Cenotaph, Belfast	Belfast City Hall	1929	Sir Alfred Brumwell Thomas	Cenotaph	Stone		Q30323973	
More images	Queen Victoria	Belfast City Hall	1903	Sir Thomas Brock	Statue on pedestal with supporting figures	Stone and bronze		Q17778520	
More images	Titanic Memorial	Belfast City Hall	1920	Sir Thomas Brock	Statue group on pedestal	Stone		Q7809806	
More images	Sir Edward James Harland	Belfast City Hall	1903	Sir Thomas Brock	Statue on pedestal			Q17778453	
More images	The 1st Marquess of Dufferin and Ava	Belfast City Hall	1906	Frederick W. Pomeroy	Statue on pedestal with canopy			Q17778397	
More images	Sir James Horner Haslett	Belfast City Hall	1909	Frederick W. Pomeroy	Statue on pedestal			Q17778550	
More images	Sir Daniel Dixon	Belfast City Hall	1910	Sir Hamo Thornycroft	Statue on pedestal			Q72151439	
More images	The 1st Viscount Pirrie	Belfast City Hall	1924	Bertram Pergram	Bust on pedestal	Bronze			Originally erected in Belfast City Cemetery. Refurbished and re-erected on grounds of Belfast City Hall in 2006.
More images	R. J. McMordie	Belfast City Hall	1919	Frederick W. Pomeroy	Statue on pedestal				
More images	Boer War memorial	Belfast City Hall	1905	Sydney March	Statue group on pedestal with plaques	Stone and bronze			
	James Joseph Magennis	Belfast City Hall	1999	Elizabeth McLaughlin					
	Korean War memorial	Belfast City Hall	1951						Originally erected in Korea on site of battlefield at Chaegunghyon. Re-erected in St. Patrick's Barracks in Ballymena in 1962. Re-erected and dedicated at Belfast City Hall in 2010
	USAEF memorial	Belfast City Hall	1943	T. F. O. Rippingham					Originally sited at gateway to City Hall. Moved to present location in 1995 and rededicated by President Bill Clinton
	Mary Ann McCracken	Belfast City Hall	2024	Ralf Sander & Naomi Sander		Bronze			Unveiled on International Women's Day 2024
	Winifred Carney	Belfast City Hall	2024	Ralf Sander & Naomi Sander		Bronze			Unveiled on International Women's Day 2024

== South Belfast ==
South Belfast is defined as the area of the city south of the railway line from the A12 (Westlink) to the River Lagan. It includes Queen's University Belfast, the Ulster Museum and the Botanic Gardens.

Image	Title / subject	Location and coordinates	Date	Artist / designer	Type	Material	Designation	Wikidata	Notes
More images	The 1st Baron Kelvin	Botanic Gardens (Belfast)	1913	Albert Bruce-Joy	Statue on pedestal	Bronze and stone			
More images	New metal piece	Ulster Museum	1978	Barry Flanagan	Abstract sculpture	Metal			
More images	Modern sculpture	Ulster Museum			Abstract sculpture	Metal			
	Belfast Wheel	King William Park			Sculpture	Bronze			Wheel is composed of 12 segments, each depicting an area of the city
	Ella Pirrie	Belfast City Hospital	2007	Ross Wilson	Statue	Bronze			
More images	Mother - Daughter - Sister	Sandy Row	2015	Ross Wilson	Statue	Bronze			
More images	Sweet Water Arch	Stranmillis, Belfast 54.574907°N 5.931665°W	2009	Denis O'Connor	Sculpture	Stainless steel	4m high		The Irish name for the area, "An Srúthan Milís", means "sweet stream".
More images	Tate Avenue Sculptures	Tate Avenue	2009	David Dudgeon	Sculpture	Steel			
More images	Blackbird of Belfast Lough Sculptures	Ormeau Road	2010	Daniela Balmaverde	Sculpture				Pair of sculptures - one at junction of Dromara Street and Ormeau Road and the other in the grounds of Ormeau Road Library

=== The Queen's University of Belfast ===
Image	Title / subject	Location and coordinates	Date	Artist / designer	Type	Material	Designation	Wikidata	Notes
More images	War memorial	Queen's University Belfast	1924	Sir Thomas Brock	Statue group on pedestal with plaques	Bronze and stone		Q66459168	
	Sir William Whitla	Queen's University Belfast	1942	Gilbert Bayes	Bust in niche	Bronze			
	Reclining Figure	Queen's University Belfast	1958	Frederick Edward McWilliam	Sculpture	Bronze			
More images	Eco	McClay Library, Queen's University Belfast	2008	Marc Didou	Sculpture				
	George J. Mitchell	Queen's University, Belfast	2023	Colin Davidson	bust	bronze			

== East Belfast ==
East Belfast is defined as the city east of the River Lagan. It includes the Titanic Quarter and the Stormont Estate.

Image	Title / subject	Location and coordinates	Date	Artist / designer	Type	Material	Designation	Wikidata	Notes
More images	Titanica	Titanic Centre	2012	Rowan Gillespie	Sculpture on pedestal	Bronze			
More images	Titanic Kit	Titanic Quarter	2009	Tony Stallard	Sculpture	Bronze		Q48743282	
More images	Glass of Thrones Windows	Titanic Quarter	2021	Unknown	stained glass window	glass			Series of six stained glass windows commissioned by Tourism Ireland to celebrate characters and events from the Game of Thrones TV series
More images	Titanic Yardmen 401	Newtownards Road	2012	Ross Wilson	Sculpture				
More images	The Searcher, C. S. Lewis	C.S. Lewis Square	2016	Ross Wilson	Statue group	Bronze			
More images	Narnia characters	C.S. Lewis Square	2016	Maurice Harron	Statue Group	Bronze			Statues of characters from C.S. Lewis's book 'The Lion, The Witch and the Wardrobe'
	The Longbridge Stone	Albertbridge Road and Castlereagh Street	1831	N/A		Stone			Said to be the last remnant of the Long Bridge which spanned the Lagan from Ballymacarret to Belfast
More images	The Baron Carson	Stormont Estate	1933	Leonard Stanford Merrifield	Statue on pedestal	Bronze and stone			
More images	The Gleaner	Stormont Estate		John Knox	Sculpture on pedestal	Stone			

== West Belfast ==
West Belfast is defined as the area of the city west of the A12 (westlink) and south of the Crumlin Road. It includes the Falls Road and the Shankill Road. West Belfast is famous for its murals, both Loyalist and Republican. These are discussed separately in the article Murals in Northern Ireland.

Image	Title / subject	Location and coordinates	Date	Artist / designer	Type	Material	Designation	Wikidata	Notes
	James Connolly	Falls Road	2016	Steve Feeny	Statue on pedestal	Bronze and stone			
More images	RISE	Broadway Roundabout, A12	2011	Wolfgang Buttress	Abstract sculpture			Q7335884	
	Clonard Martyrs Memorial	Bombay Street	2000		Celtic wheel cross	Stone			
	Garden of Remembrance	Falls Road	2001						
	Bayardo Bomb Memorial	Shankill Road	2008						
	William of Orange	Clifton Street	1889	Harry Hems	Equestrian statue	bronze			Equestrian statue on the roof of Clifton Street Orange Hall
	William Conor	Shankill Road	2015		statue	Bronze			
	The Millie	Crumlin Road	2010	Ross Wilson		Bronze			Statue to Belfast's female linen mill workers
	Mill Workers	Crumlin Road		Eric Jones		Stone			

== North Belfast ==
North Belfast is defined as the area of the city north of the Crumlin Road, A12 (westlink) and M3 on the west bank of the Lagan.

Image	Title / subject	Location and coordinates	Date	Artist / designer	Type	Material	Designation	Wikidata	Notes
	Belfast Seahorse	Dargan Road	2013	Ralf Sander	Statue	Stainless Steel			
More images	The Flying Angel	Prince's Dock Street	2000	Maurice Harron		Bronze and Stainless Steel			
More images	The Dividers	Clarendon Dock	2002	Vivien Burnside		Bronze and Stainless Steel			

== See also ==
- List of public art in Dublin
- List of public art in Cork City
- List of public art in Limerick
- List of public art in Galway city
