= List of public art in Limerick =

This is a list of public art on permanent display in Limerick, Ireland. The list applies only to public art accessible in a public space; it does not include artwork in display inside museums. Public art may include sculptures, statues, monuments, memorials, murals and mosaics.

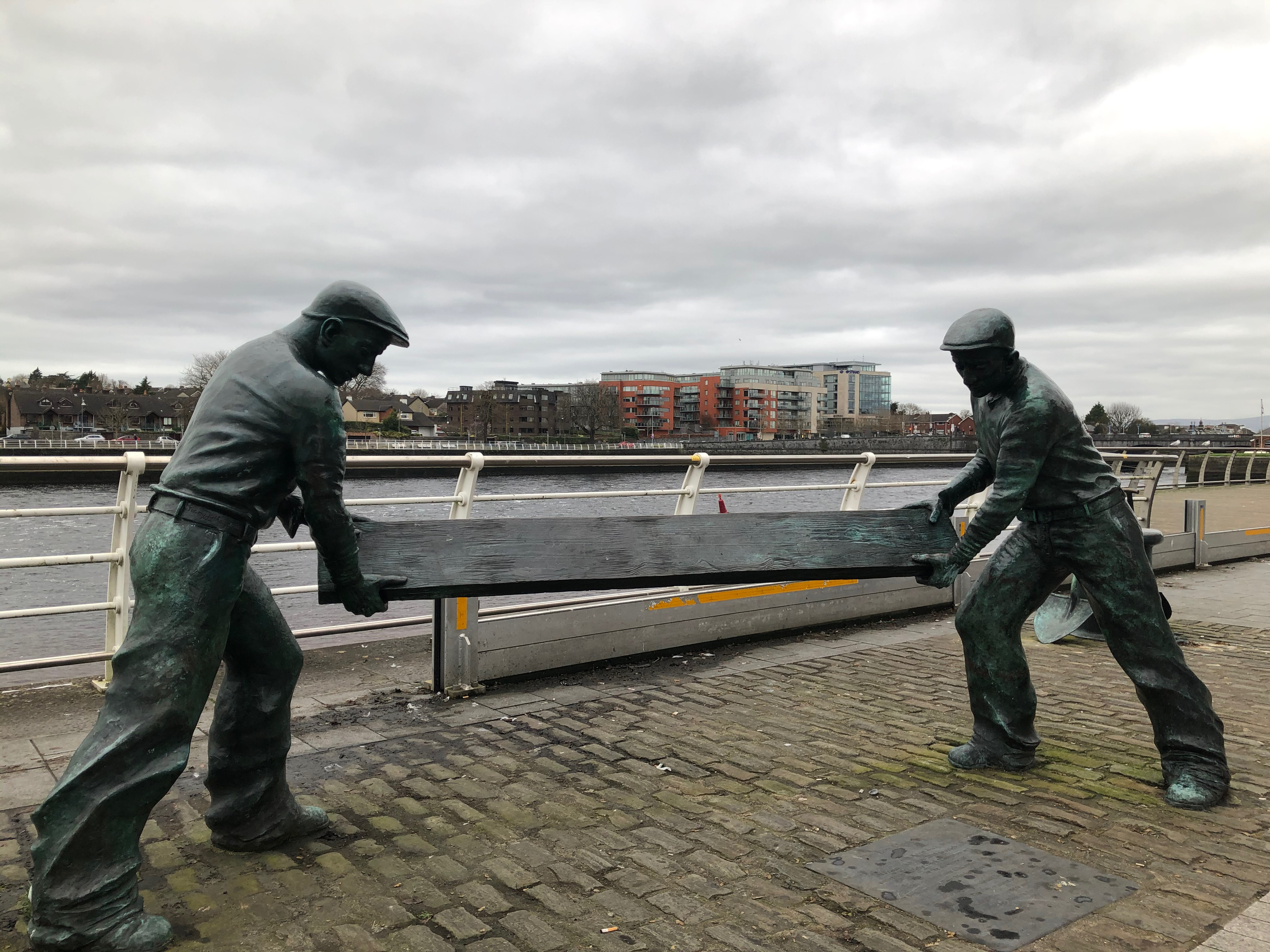
The Dockers Monument in Limerick

== Public art in city centre ==
Image	Title / subject	Location and coordinates	Date	Artist / designer	Type	Designation	Notes
More images	O'Connell Monument	The Crescent	1857	John Hogan			The first public outdoor statue of Daniel O'Connell to be erected.
More images	Sarsfield Memorial	Cathedral Place	1881	John Lawlor			
	John O'Grady Monument	Ballysimon Road	1940s?				
More images	1916 Memorial	Sarsfield Bridge	1954	Albert Power			
More images	Tait Clock	Baker Place	1867	William Edward Corbett			
More images	Merchant Seamen's Memorial	Russell Quay	1986	Capt. E. K. Donnelly			
More images	Richard Harris	Bedford Row	2007	Jim Connolly			
	Frank McCourt	Hartstonge Street Upper	2011	Séamus Connolly			
More images	Players	O'Connell Street	1992	Robin Buick			
More images	Singer from Quimper	Quimper Square	1992	Rowan Gillespie	Depicts a Breton singer from Quimper, a city twinned with Limerick.		
More images	The Broken Heart	Lower Mallow Street	1997	Maria Pizzuti			
	Manchester Martyrs Memorial	Mount St. Lawrence Cemetery					
More images	Terry Wogan	Sarsfield Bridge	2017	Rory Breslin			
More images	Limerick Dockers Monument	Spokane Walk	2010	Mike Duhan			
	To the People of Limerick	Southern Ring Road	2006	Kevin McMahon			
	Statue of Saint Michael	Atop St Michael's Church, Denmark Street Upper 52.6637313°N 8.62393321°W	1779–81	Unknown	Gilt statue of Saint Michael slaying the dragon.		
	Horse outside	Hunt Museum	2014	Angela Connolly			

=== People's Park and Pery Square ===
Image	Title / subject	Location and coordinates	Date	Artist / designer	Type	Designation	Notes
More images	Rice Monument	People's Park, Pery Square	1829	Thomas Kirk			
More images	Richard Russell Drinking fountain	People's Park	1877	John Smith & Co			
	Children's Remembrance Memorial	People's park	2002				
More images	World War I & II Memorial	Pery Square	1950				
	Military Memorial, Irish Defence Forces	Pery Square					

=== King's Island ===
Image	Title / subject	Location and coordinates	Date	Artist / designer	Type	Designation	Notes
More images	Michael Hogan	King John's Castle Plaza	2005	Jim Connolly			Known as "The Bard of Thomond" Great-great grandfather of Mike and Noel Hogan (The Cranberries).
	Michael Hogan Plaque	Bishops' Palace	1990	Eddie Murphy			
	Oarsman	Athlunkard Street	1927				
More images	Fountain of Heritage (Wild Geese)	Riverside Walk, City Hall	1991	William Turner			
More images	Anti-War Memorial	George's Quay	1987	Vincent Brown			
	Wave Form	Merchant's Quay	1987	Jim Flavin			
	Volte	Merchant's Quay	1990	Vivienne Roche			

=== Thomondgate and west city ===
Image	Title / subject	Location and coordinates	Date	Artist / designer	Type	Designation	Notes
More images	Treaty Stone	Thomond Bridge	1865 (mounted on plinth)	N/A			Reputed to be the stone on which the Treaty of Limerick was signed. Originally used as a step to mount horses.
	The Mayor's Stone	Old Cratloe Road	1991	Eddie Murphy			
	Aesop's Fables	Dunalaun Estate, New Road	1993	Tom Fitzgerald			
	The River of Life	Shannon Close		Noel Hoare			
	Persona	Mayorstone Garda Station	2000	Michael Quane			

== University of Limerick ==
Image	Title / subject	Location and coordinates	Date	Artist / designer	Type	Designation	Notes
	Equatorial Sun Dial	University of Limerick	1986	Ken Thompson			
More images	Together and Apart	University of Limerick	2001	Antony Gormley			
More images	Tree of Life	University of Limerick		Tom Fitzgerald			
	Swimmers	University of Limerick		Louise Walsh			
	Salmon Fall	University of Limerick		Michael Warren			
	Silver Pencils	University of Limerick		Peter Logan			
	Crann Soilse	University of Limerick		Sean Scully			
More images	Geometric Forms	Schuman Building, University of Limerick		Alexandra Wejchert			

== Past public art ==
Image	Title / subject	Location and coordinates	Date	Artist / designer	Type	Designation	Notes
	Viscount FitzGibbon	Sarsfield Bridge	1857	Patrick MacDowell			Blown up in 1930. Plinth reused for 1916 memorial.

== See also ==
- List of public art in Belfast
- List of public art in Cork city
- List of public art in Dublin
- List of public art in Galway city

== Bibliography ==
"Street Art and Artefacts Limerick City: Inventory by Category" (PDF). Limerick Civic Trust.
