= List of public art in Cork city =

This is a list of public art on permanent public display in Cork city, Ireland. The list applies only to works of public art accessible in a public space; it does not include artwork on display inside museums. Public art may include sculptures, statues, monuments, memorials, murals and mosaics.

== Public art in city centre ==
Image	Title / subject	Location and coordinates	Date	Artist / designer	Type	Designation	Notes
More images	Father Theobald Mathew	St Patrick's Street	1864	John Henry Foley			"The Statue"
More images	The Echo boy	St Patrick's Street	1991	Barry Moloney			
	Examiner Office	St. Patrick's Street	2009	Eithne Ring & Liam Lavery			
More images	National Monument	Grand Parade, Cork	1906	D. J. Coakley			
More images	Berwick Fountain	Grand Parade, Cork	1860	Sir John Benson			
	Michael Collins	Grand Parade	2023	Kevin Holland			
	Scenius 1	Peace Park, Grand Parade	2024	Tommy Lysaght (with Cork Simon Community and Headway Ireland)			
	'Lest We Forget' War Memorial	South Mall, Cork	1925				
	Michael Collins	Imperial Hotel, South Mall, Cork	2023				
	City	South Mall, Cork	1985	Patrick O'Sullivan			
	Cork City Battalion Irish Volunteers Memorial	South Mall, Cork	2016	Mick Wilkins			
	Denny Lane plaque	South Mall, Cork					Denny Lane (1818 - 1895) was the author of the poem "Carrigdhoun"
	Fountain, English Market	English Market	1800s	W. R. Harris (firm)			
	The Onion Seller	Bishop Lucey Park	1985	Séamus Murphy			Presented by Sunbeam Wolsey PLC
	Swan Fountain	Bishop Lucey Park	1985	John Behan			
More images	The Onion Seller	The Coal Quay (Corn Market Street)	1995	Séamus Murphy			Presented by Ray Doherty (Franchisee McDonald's)
	Rory Gallagher	Rory Gallagher Place (formerly St. Paul's Square)	1997	Geraldine Creedon			
	George Boole Plaque	Bachelors Quay					

=== Southside ===
This is defined as the area of the city south of the south channel of the River Lee, and inside the South Ring Road (N40).

Image	Title / subject	Location and coordinates	Date	Artist / designer	Type	Designation	Notes
	Cork 800 Memorial	Cork City Hall	1985				
	Tomás Mac Curtain	Cork City Hall					
	Terence MacSwiney	Cork City Hall					
More images	Two Working Men	Cork County Hall	1969	Oisín Kelly			"Cha and Miah"
	Christ the King	Turners Cross	1931	John Storrs			
	McCarthy Monument	Blackrock Road	1870	William Atkins			
	Resurrection Angel	Saint Fin Barre's Cathedral	1879	William Burges			"The Goldy Angel"
	Doorway Saint Fin Barre's Cathedral	Saint Fin Barre's Cathedral					
	"Saurian"	Lee Fields	1985	Jim Buckley			This red dragon-like sculpture, which is 15 feet tall and 30 feet long, is one of several works completed as part of the Cork 800 Sculpture Symposium.

=== Northside ===
This is defined as the area of the city north of the north channel of the River Lee.

Image	Title / subject	Location and coordinates	Date	Artist / designer	Type	Designation	Notes
	Salmon Weathervane	Church of St Anne, Shandon					
	William Delany (bishop)	Cathedral of St Mary and St Anne					
	Lost Industries	Leitrim Street, Blackpool		Denis O'Connor			
More images	Delaney Brothers monument	Dublin Hill	1940 - 1950				
	Thomas Kent	Cork Kent railway station		James MacCarthy			
	Saint George	Penrose House, Penrose Quay	1832	Unknown			Penrose House was the location of the St. George Steam Packet Company.
	Callaghan's Gate	Lower Glanmire Road					Entrance gateway to Lotabeg House
	Ship at Sail	Tivoli Dual Carriageway	1996	Kevin Holland			

=== Fitzgerald's Park ===
Image	Title / subject	Location and coordinates	Date	Artist / designer	Type	Designation	Notes
	Michael Collins	Fitzgerald's Park		Séamus Murphy			
	Tom Barry	Fitzgerald's Park		Séamus Murphy			
	Éamon De Valera	Fitzgerald's Park		Séamus Murphy			
	General Daniel Florence O'Leary	Fitzgerald's Park	2010				
	Adam and Eve	Fitzgerald's Park		Edward Delaney			
	Apple Woman	Fitzgerald's Park	1968	Marshall Hutson			
	Dreamline	Fitzgerald's Park	1932	Séamus Murphy			Sculpture has been restored and brought inside Cork Public Museum to protect it from the elements
	Boy with Boat	Fitzgerald's Park		Joseph Higgins			
	Reflection	Fitzgerald's Park		James Horan			
	Girl Dancer	Fitzgerald's Park		Oisín Kelly			
	Girl with Seashells	Fitzgerald's Park					
More images	Father Mathew Memorial Fountain	Fitzgerald's Park					
	Abstract Sculpture	Fitzgerald's Park	1974	Sergio Cuevas			
	Cois na Laoi	Fitzgerald's Park	1994	Betty Gold			
	Titanic Memorial	Fitzgerald's Park	2012				Erected by the Cork Titanic Society

=== University College Cork ===
Image	Title / subject	Location and coordinates	Date	Artist / designer	Type	Designation	Notes
	The Growth Dome	University College Cork		Eilis O'Connell			
	Fantailed on the Falls	University College Cork	1995	Conor Fallon			
	Female Nude	University College Cork					
	Horse's Head	University College Cork	1986	Michael Quane			
	Figure Talking to a Quadruped	University College Cork	1995	Michael Quane			
More images	George Boole	University College Cork	2016	Paul Ferriter			
	Republican Prisoners Memorial	University College Cork					Located on the wall of the old Cork County Gaol, which has been incorporated into the perimeter wall of UCC.
	IRA Memorial	University College Cork	1948				Memorial to 13 IRA prisoners executed in 1920 and 1921 during the War of Independence.
	Saint Finbar	University College Cork	1915	John Sisk & Sons			Statue of Saint Finbar in the tympanum of the Honan Chapel.

== Past public art ==
Image	Title / subject	Location and coordinates	Date	Artist / designer	Type	Designation	Notes
	George II	Grand Parade, Cork	1762-1862	John Nost			Damaged in 1862 and subsequently removed. Nicknames were "George-a-horseback", "The Yellow Horse"
	Boy and girl	Green Coat Hospital School	1716				Now in St Anne's Church, Shandon. "Bob and Joan"
	Dunscombe Testimonial Fountain	Shandon Street					

== See also ==
- List of public art in Belfast
- List of public art in Dublin
- List of public art in Galway city
- List of public art in Limerick
