= The Frankenstein Project =

The Frankenstein Project may refer to:

- Tender Son: The Frankenstein Project, a 2010 Hungarian film by Kornél Mundruczó
- The Frankenstein Project (sculpture), a contemporary sculpture by Tony Stallard
