= List of public art in Galway city =

This is a list of public art on permanent display in Galway City Ireland. The list applies only to public art accessible in a public space; it does not include artwork in display inside museums. Public art may include sculptures, statues, monuments, memorials, murals and mosaics.

== Public art in city centre ==
Image	Title / subject	Location and coordinates	Date	Artist / designer	Type	Designation	Notes
More images	Galway hookers Monument	Eyre Square	1984	Éamonn O'Doherty			
More images	Browne Doorway	Eyre Square	1627				
	Pádraic Ó Conaire (Bronze replica)	Eyre Square	2017	Maurice Quillinan, based on 1935 original by Albert Power			Limestone original now in Galway City Museum (see below)
More images	Liam Mellows Monument	Eyre Square	1957	Domhnall Ó Murchadha			
	Kennedy Memorial	Eyre Square	1965	Albert O'Toole			
	Lynch Coat of Arms, Lynch's Castle	Shop Street	Medieval	Unknown			
More images	Christopher Columbus Monument	Spanish Arch Parade	1992	Mick Wilkins			
More images	Oscar Wilde & Eduard Vilde	William Street	2004	Replica of original by T. Kirsipuu			Original of this sculpture is located in Tartu.
	Final Journey	Forster Street	2009	Mick Wilkins			Magdalen women memorial
	Galway Girl	Quay Street 53.2711°N 9.0541°W	2022				

=== The Claddagh and Salthill ===
Image	Title / subject	Location and coordinates	Date	Artist / designer	Type	Designation	Notes
	Claddagh Memorial Sculpture	Claddagh Quay	2003	Mick Wilkins			
	Thomas Nicholas Burke	Nimmo's Pier, Claddagh	1948	John Francis Kavanagh			
	Naomh Máirtín de Porres	St. Mary's Priory, Claddagh Quay	1989	James McKenna			
More images	Claddagh Icon	Father Griffin Road/ Fairhill Road Upper 53.2694°N 9.0572°W	2009	John Coll			
	Galway Famine Ship Memorial	Celia Griffin Memorial Park, Salthill	2012				

=== University of Galway ===
Image	Title / subject	Location and coordinates	Date	Artist / designer	Type	Designation	Notes
More images	Cathal Ó Fríl Monument	University of Galway					
	Ceiliúradh	University of Galway		John Coll			
	Equality Emerging	University of Galway	2001	John Behan			
	Twin Spires	University of Galway		John Behan			

== Past public art ==
Image	Title / subject	Location and coordinates	Date	Artist / designer	Type	Designation	Notes
	From Here To	Galway-Mayo Institute of Technology library, Ballybane	2007	Grace Weir			Individual counters affixed to the interior walls of the library showed the distances of each of the planets to the library, as they moved continually in real time.
	Lord Dunkellin	Eyre Square	1873	John Henry Foley			Destroyed in 1922
	Pádraic Ó Conaire	Eyre Square	1935	Albert Power			Limestone original vandalised in 1999. Now in Galway City Museum

== See also ==
- List of public art in Belfast
- List of public art in Cork city
- List of public art in Dublin
- List of public art in Limerick
