= John Behan (sculptor) =

Irish artist (born 1938)

- Born: 1938 (age 87–88)
- Education: National College of Art and Design; Ealing Art College
- Occupation: Sculptor

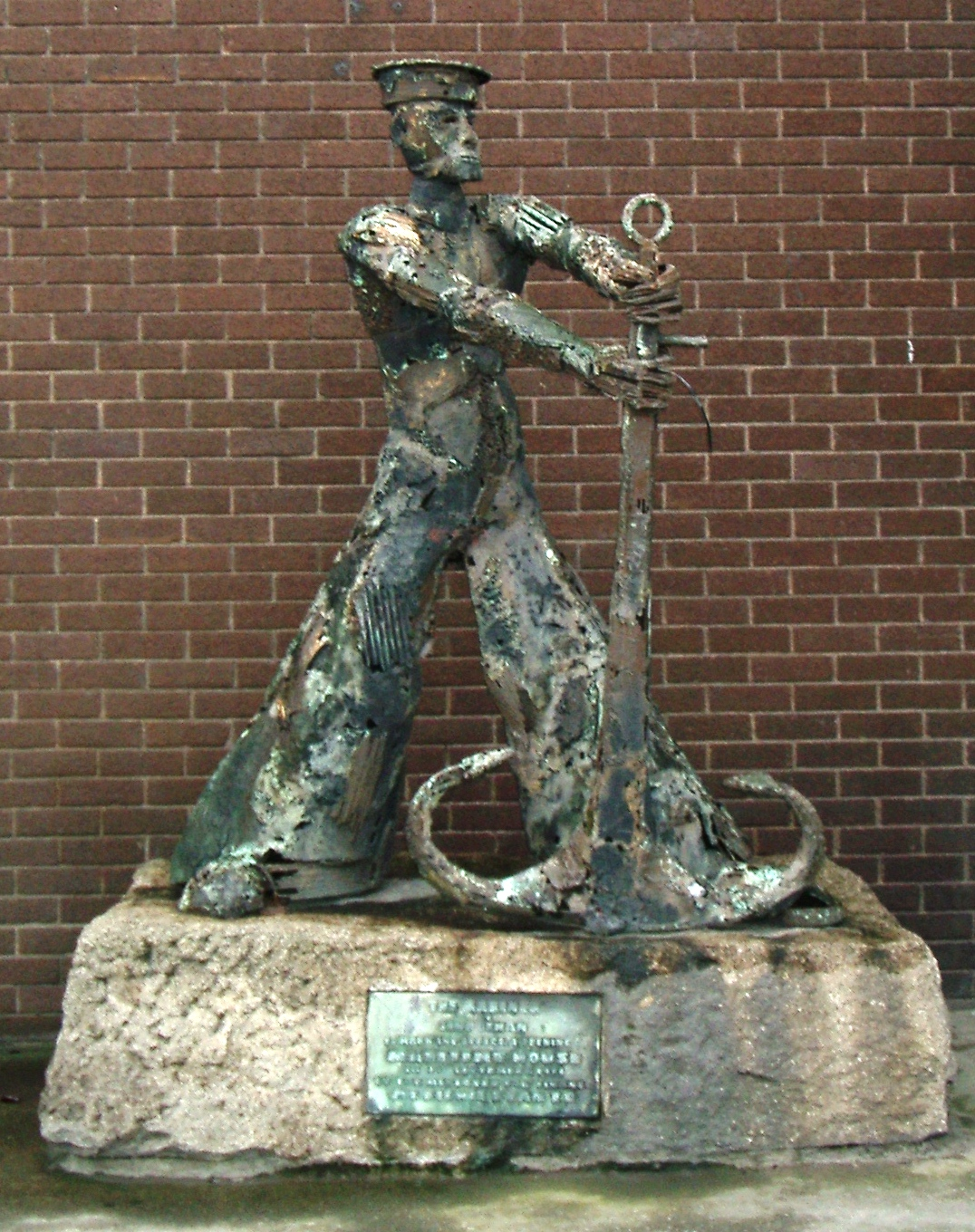
John Behan's The Mariner, on Dublin's North Wall Quay

John Behan (born 1938) is an Irish sculptor from Dublin.

== Career ==
Behan studied at the National College of Art and Design in Dublin, and Ealing Art College, London, as well as Oslo's Royal Academy School. He is a member of Aosdána.

Behan helped establish the Project Arts Centre in Dublin in 1967, and the Dublin Art Foundry. He also participated in the Irish Exhibition of Living Art and shows at the Royal Hibernian Academy.

== Selected works ==
Notable Behan sculptures include Arrival, commissioned by the Irish government and presented to the United Nations in 2000, and Wings of the World in Shenzhen, China, 1991.

In the mid-1990s, Behan was commissioned by the Irish government to create a National Famine Memorial that would encompass the magnitude of the suffering and loss endured by the people of Ireland during the Famine period. The memorial, located in Murrisk, County Mayo, was unveiled by Mary Robinson on 20 July 1997.

The Liberty Tree sculpture in Carlow, designed by John Behan, commemorates the 1798 Rising of the United Irishmen. Several hundred rebels were slain in Carlow town and their remains are buried in the 'Croppies Grave', in Graiguecullen, County Carlow.

== See also ==
- List of public art in Cork
- List of public art in Galway city
