= The Big Fish =

Fish statue in Belfast, Northern Ireland

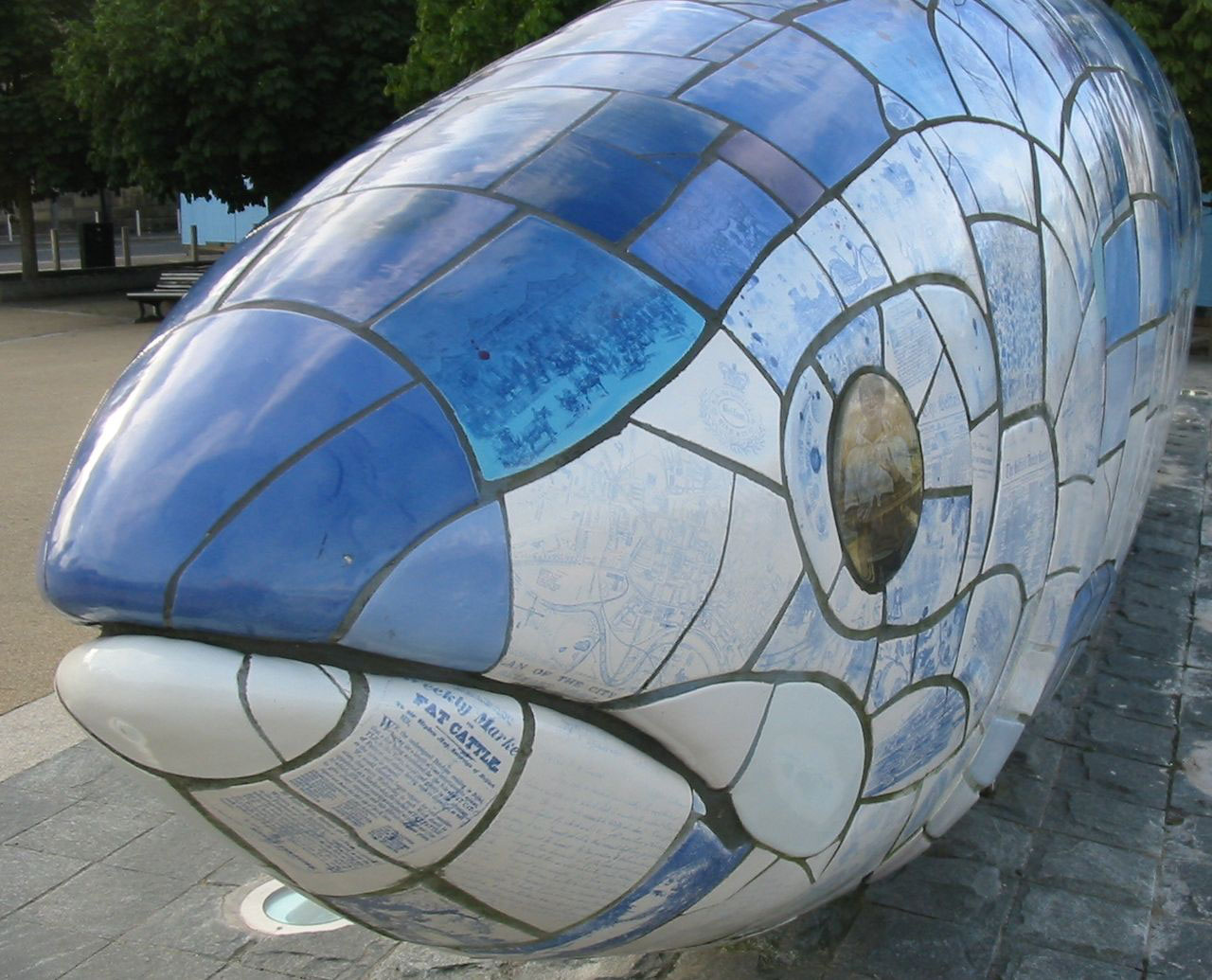
- Artist: John Kindness
- Year: 1999
- Type: Ceramic
- Dimensions: 3 m × 10 m (9.8 ft × 33 ft)
- Location: Belfast, Northern Ireland; 54.6015°N 5.9217°W

The Big Fish, also known as the Salmon of Knowledge, is a printed ceramic mosaic sculpture by John Kindness. The 10-metre-long (33 ft) statue was constructed in 1999 and installed on Donegall Quay in Belfast, Northern Ireland, near the Lagan Lookout and Custom House.

The Big Fish's image appears on tourism material related to Belfast and Northern Ireland.

== Construction ==
The outer skin of the fish is a cladding of ceramic tiles decorated with texts and images relating to the history of Belfast. According to the Belfast City Council, each scale "tells a story about the city". Material from Tudor times to present day newspaper headlines are included along with contributions from Belfast school children (including a soldier and an Ulster Fry). The Ulster Museum provided the primary source of historic images, while local schools/day centres located along the line of the River Farset were approached to provide drawings for the fish. Images were provided by Glenwood Primary School, St Comgalls, and Everton Day Centres.

The Big Fish contains a time capsule storing information, images, and poetry on the city.

== Commission ==
The Big Fish was funded by the Laganside Corporation and the National Lottery, through the Big Lottery Fund, through the Arts Council of Northern Ireland.

The sculpture was constructed in 1999. The site is a significant landmark as it is the location of the confluence of the River Farset with the River Lagan (Belfast is named after the River Farset).

== Vandalism ==
At around 12:30am on Sunday 20 September 2026, the left eye of the sculpture, alongside multiple ceramic scales, were destroyed by a man wielding a sledgehammer. In November 2026 the 44-year-old man was jailed for five months after causing an estimated £10,000 worth of damage to the sculpture.

== Gallery ==
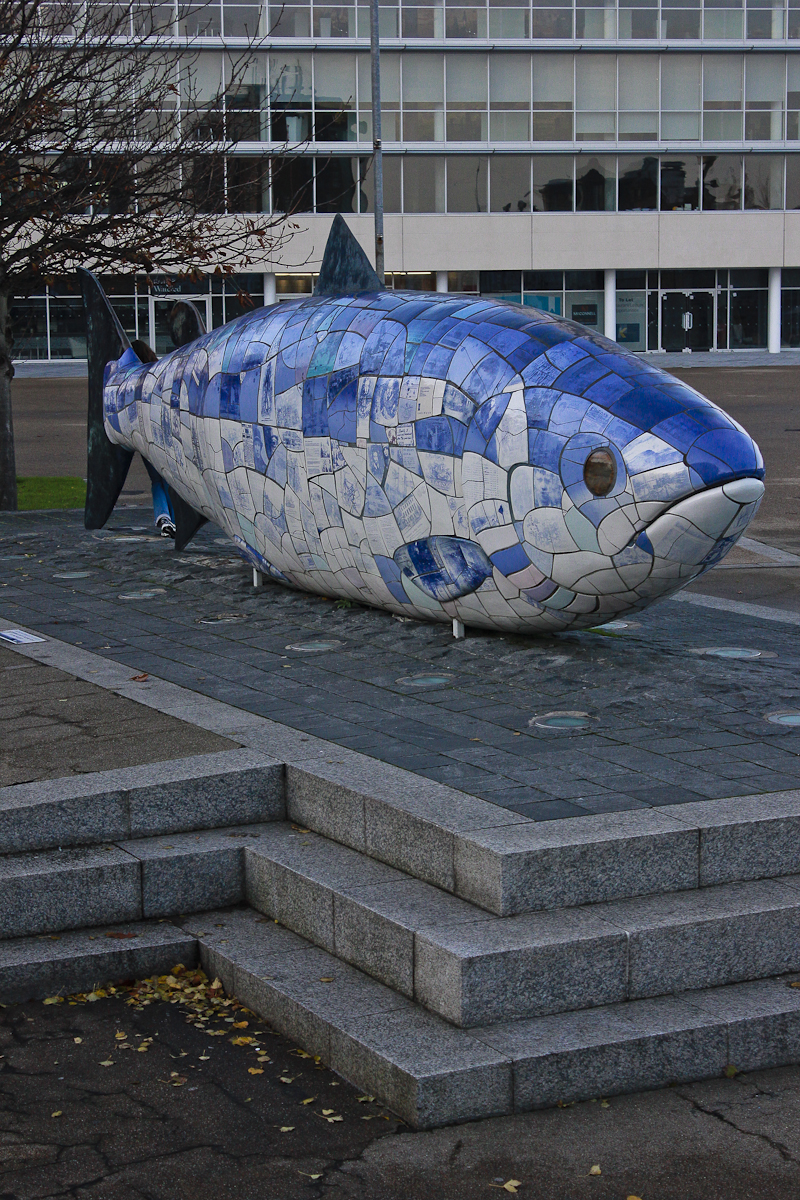
Location on raised platform

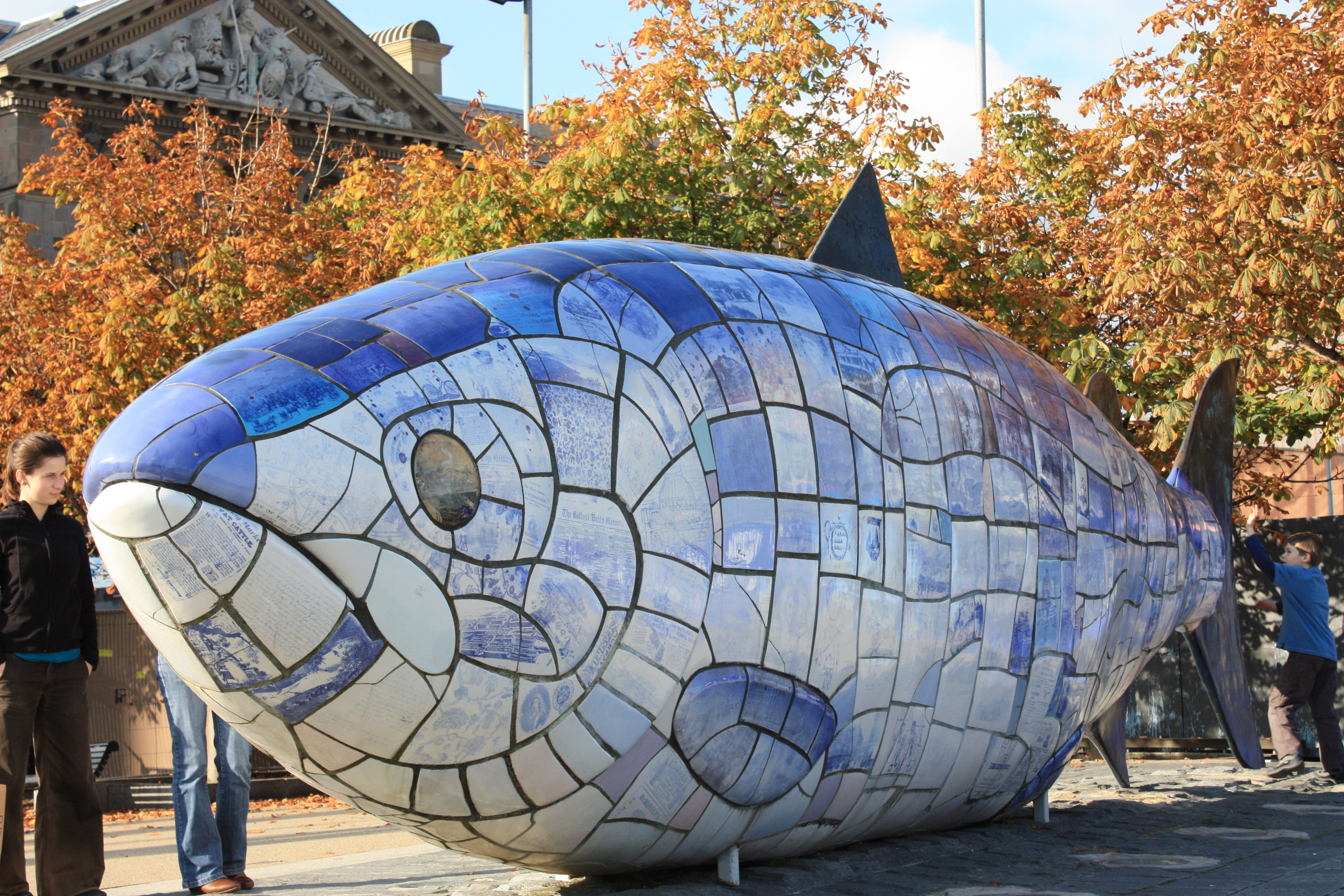
Visitors view The Big Fish

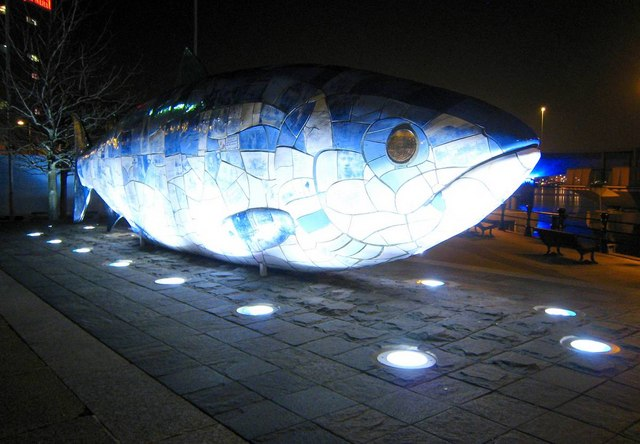
Lit up at night

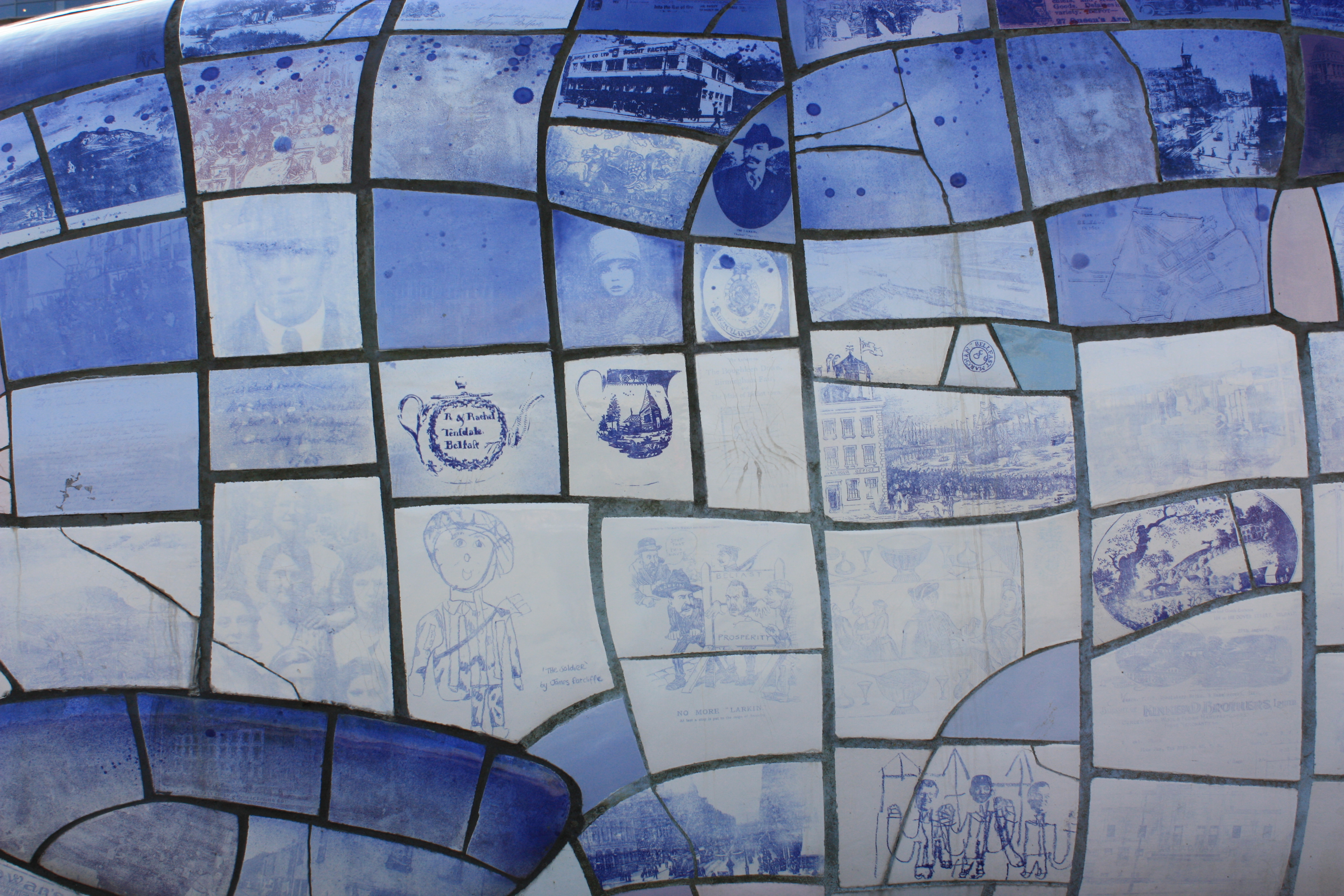
Close-up of scales

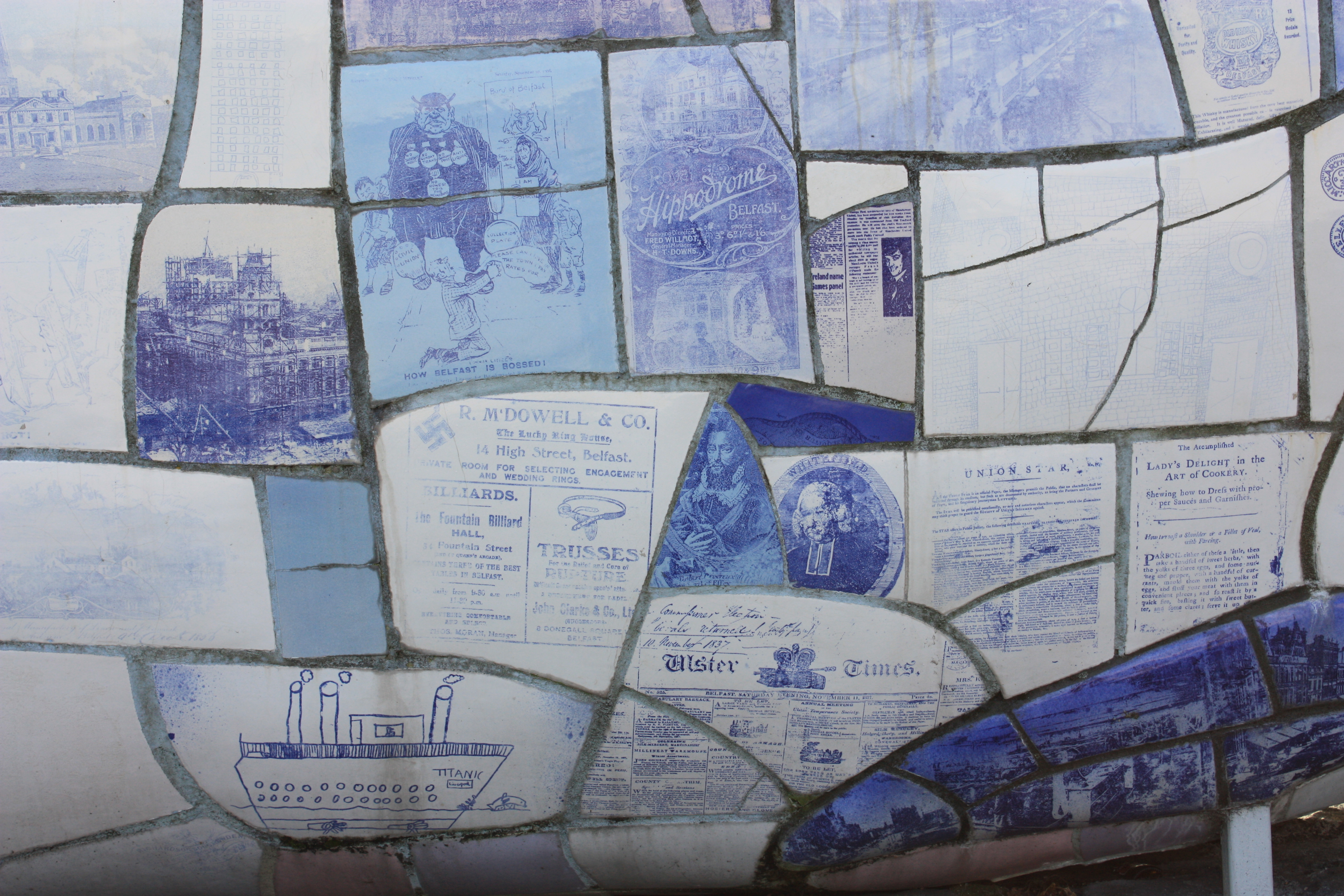
Close-up of scales

== See also ==
- List of public art in Belfast
