= Sheep on the Road =

Sculpture in Belfast, Northern Ireland

Coordinates: 54.5963°N 5.9187°W

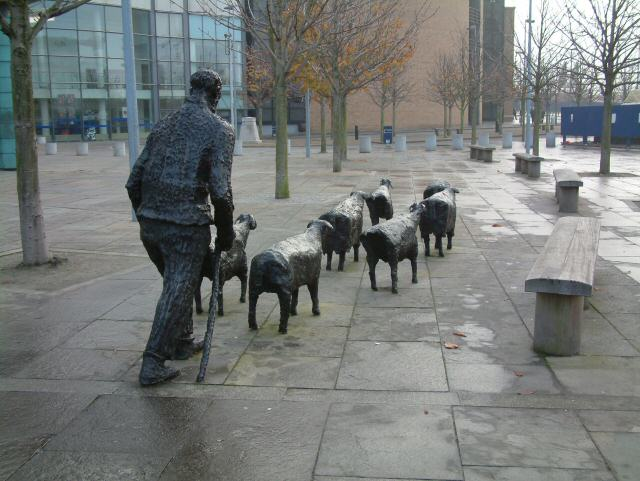
- Artist: Deborah Brown
- Year: 1991
- Movement: Bronze sculpture
- Subject: Sheep

Sheep on the Road, September 2009

Sheep on the Road is an outdoor sculpture located in Belfast, Northern Ireland. It is a life-size bronzes of six sheep and a shepherd, sculpted in 1991 by acclaimed Northern Irish sculptor, Deborah Brown.

The sculpture was first commissioned by the Arts Council of Northern Ireland for their sculpture garden at Riddell Hall, Belfast. In 1999, it was purchased by Laganside Corporation and moved to the entrance of Waterfront Hall.

== See also ==
- List of public art in Belfast
