= Spirit of Belfast =

Sculpture by Dan George in Belfast

Coordinates: 54.59875°N 5.92762°W

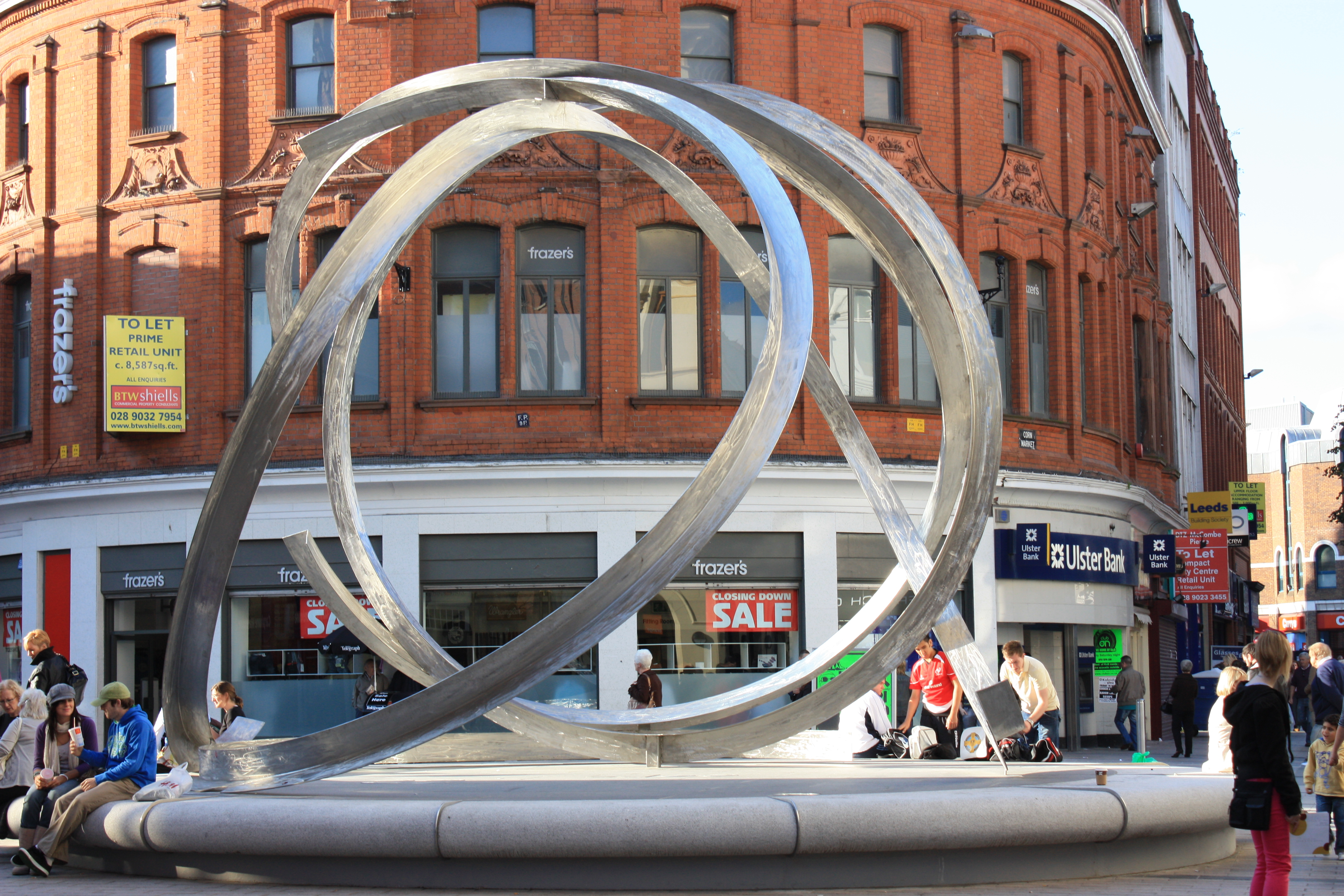
- Artist: Dan George
- Year: 2009
- Type: Steel
- Dimensions: 700 cm (280 in)
- Location: Belfast, Northern Ireland

The Spirit of Belfast is a public art sculpture by Dan George in Belfast, Northern Ireland. The sculpture was unveiled on 25 September 2009 after a series of delays and is located on Arthur Square, close to the main point of access to Victoria Square. The sculpture is constructed of steel and cost £200,000. As with other public works of art in Northern Ireland the sculpture has been given a nickname, the Onion Rings.

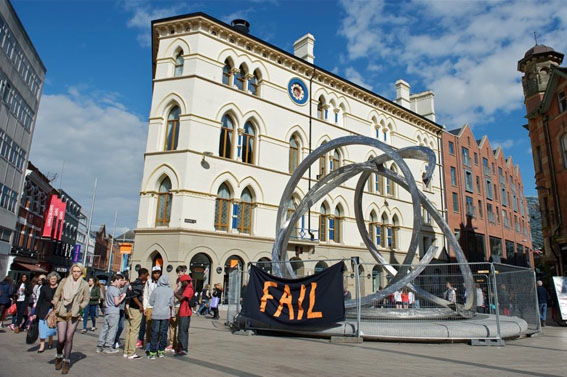
Critical Fail, Photograph of public intervention on the Spirit of Belfast Sculpture, Cornmarket, Belfast, 2012 by Tonya McMullan

== Construction ==
The coloured lighting is designed to reflect the texture and lightness of linen, while the metal reflects the strength and beauty of shipbuilding, two important aspects of Belfast's history.

Spirit of Belfast is part of a £16m Belfast: Streets Ahead streetscape improvement project which aims to improve the city centre. Spirit of Belfast completes the refurbishment of Arthur Square. The sculpture was scheduled to be in place by June 2008. However, after several delays it was not put in place until September 2009.

== Unveiling ==
The sculpture was unveiled by the Department for Social Development Minister, Margaret Ritchie MLA and broadcast live on BBC Newsline on BBC One on 25 September 2009.

== Selection ==
The Department for Social Development commenced the procurement process to commission an artist for the Arthur Square artwork in June 2007. The method of selection was as follows:

- following the publication of a Design Contest Notice in the Official Journal of the EU an initial short list of 8 artists were selected by the Public Art Selection Jury, appointed by DSD, from a response of approximately 20 applicants
- the short-listed artists were invited to develop concept sketch designs
- the Public Art Selection Jury met on 10 October 2007 to consider the concepts and selected a final shortlist of three concepts to be put forward to the public vote

The Selection Panel was made up from representatives from:

- Department for Social Development
- Belfast City Council
- Planning Service
- Multi Development UK (Victoria Square developers)
- EDAW (Belfast Streets Ahead design team)
- Belfast Chamber of Trade and Commerce
- Arts Council of Northern Ireland
- Royal Society of Ulster Architects

== Arthur Square Artwork competition ==
The public were given the opportunity to view the designs that made the final shortlist and cast their vote through the Belfast: Streets Ahead website or by visiting the public exhibition at the Lagan Lookout. The vote was open from 22 October 2007 to 4 November 2007. The three short listed concepts were : Dancing Tree, Phoenix Rising and Spirit of Belfast. Spirit of Belfast was the winning art piece for Arthur Square following a public vote.

The competition results were:

- Dancing Tree: 28.8%
- Phoenix Rising: 24.6%
- Spirit of Belfast: 46.6%

== Funding ==
The sculpture has been funded by Belfast City Council and the Department for Social Development.

== Spirit of Belfast Intervention ==
In May 2012 a Belfast-based artist, Tonya McMullan, made an intervention to the Spirit of Belfast Sculpture. At the time the sculpture had protective railings around it while an investigation of the structure was underway. McMullan installed a temporary banner that read 'FAIL', the intervention was then photographed by Belfast-based photographer Jordan Hutchings. The image was circulated online in an attempt for it to become an Internet meme.

Details about this intervention, which the artist considers to be an artwork in itself, are included in Bree T, Hocking's book, The Great Reimagining, Public Art, Urban Space and the Symbolic Landscapes of a 'New' Northern Ireland ISBN 978-1-78238-621-6 and in Dorothy Hunter's article "A Public City" published online in the International Sculpture Centre Re:Sculpt blog.

== See also ==
- List of public art in Belfast
