= 1916 Memorial, Limerick =

Limerick 1916 Memorial
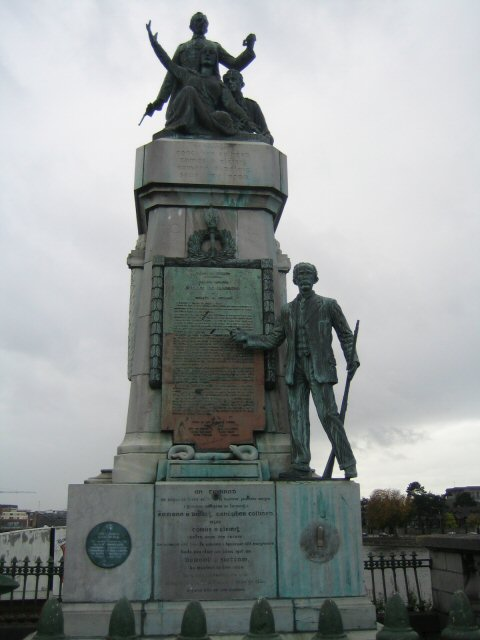
- Interactive map of Limerick 1916 Memorial
- Location: Sarsfield Bridge, Limerick, Ireland
- Designer: Albert Power
- Material: Limestone

The 1916 memorial at Limerick, Ireland, is one of many erected in the Republic of Ireland to commemorate the dead of the 1916 Easter Rising. Located at Sarsfield Bridge, it was designed by sculptor Albert Power but only completed in 1954 by his son sculptor James Power, after fund-raising efforts begun in 1931.

The bronze statues at the top of the memorial represent three local participants in the Easter Rising: Tom Clarke, Ned Daly and Con Colbert., alongside a figure representing Mother Ireland. The monument is configured around a stone plinth that previously held a statue of Viscount Fitzgibbon, of Mountshannon House, who was killed during The Charge of the Light Brigade in the Crimean War, and which was blown up by nationalists in 1930. The memorial was unveiled on Sunday 27 May 1956, by Leslie de Barra, the wife of former Republican leader Tom Barry. In her speech, she paid tribute to the "weary and patient work" and the "courageous example" of those involved in the Rising.

Patrick Hillery represented the Irish government at the 1966 Golden Jubilee commemoration in 1966, reviewing the troops who participated in the ceremony. However, by 2006, the memorial was in need of maintenance work, and Sinn Féin representatives were critical of the local authority, saying that the monument was in "a shocking state of disrepair".
