= Tony Stallard =

English artist

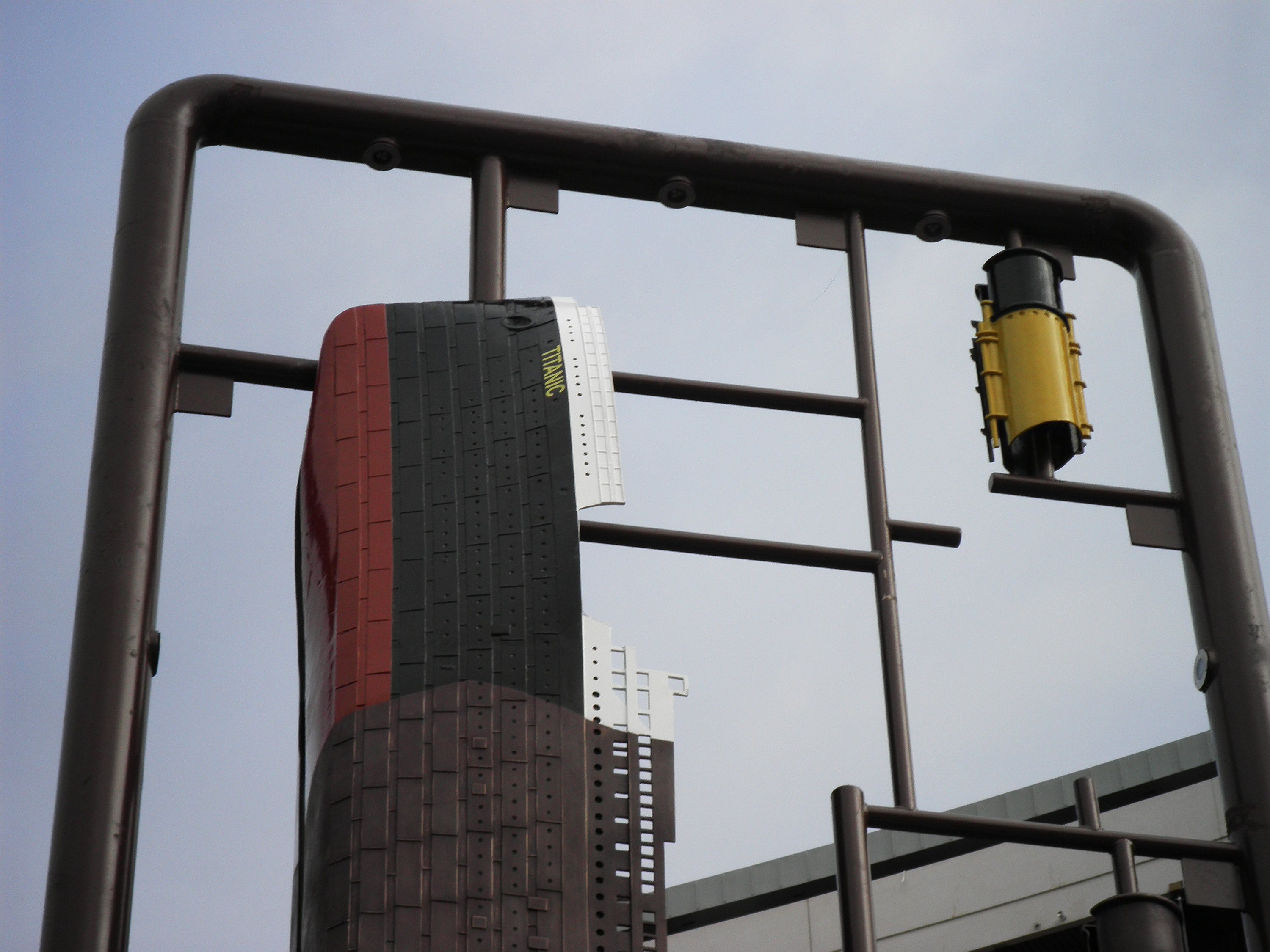
- Titanic Kit by Tony Stallard (2009)
- Born: 26 August 1958 (age 68); Bow, England, UK
- Education: Camberwell School of Art; Wimbledon School of Art; Duncan of Jordanstone College of Art and Design
- Known for: Conceptual art, installation art, public art in the public realm

Tony Stallard (born 26 August 1958) is an English artist, best known for his large scale public artworks in the United Kingdom and abroad, which utilise bronze, steel and light sculptures for work in the public realm.

== Biography ==
Stallard studied at Camberwell College of Arts, where he was influenced by Tony Carter and tutored by John Hilliard. Having started as a painter, Stallard then moved on to 3D work where he studied at Wimbledon College of Art and developed his skills of site specific sculpture. Stallard subsequently went on to Duncan of Jordanstone College of Art and Design in Dundee, which at the time was one of the few public art courses teaching the professional use of public art in the public realm.

== Career in public art ==
Stallard has worked for twenty-five years in public artworks within the public realm and his work has been exhibited widely from Canada to Ireland and the Czech Republic. This work has included research and development within architectural and engineering practices, as well as processing artworks with multiple stake holders for practical engineered concepts towards public artworks.

In 2009, Stallard was selected to by the Titanic Quarter and Arts And Business Northern Ireland to create a sculpture to promote the regeneration of the Titanic Quarter. A scale model of an Airfix kit, the piece was a reference to Belfast's industrial heritage and encourages a nostalgia for the area's shipbuilding history.

== Artworks ==
Selected works include:

- Double Helix (1999), a commission for Paddington Arts Centre.
- The Frankenstein Project (2001), a piece which draws on Blackpool’s history of freak shows, which were active until World War II.
- Seam (2002), a site specific light sculptural installation for Mayrau Mines, Czech Republic.
- Ghost Train (2009), a project which aimed to regenerate a busy, polluted area into a gateway feature and progress Watford's ambitions to be a 'greener' more sustainable town
- Titanic Kit (2009), a major, high-profile and contemporary site-specific light sculpture cast in bronze.
- The Guardian (2010), an impressive 30-foot sculpture constructed of steel and neon which aimed to capture the historical significance of the landscape.
