= Ross Wilson (artist) =

Artist from Northern Ireland (born 1958)

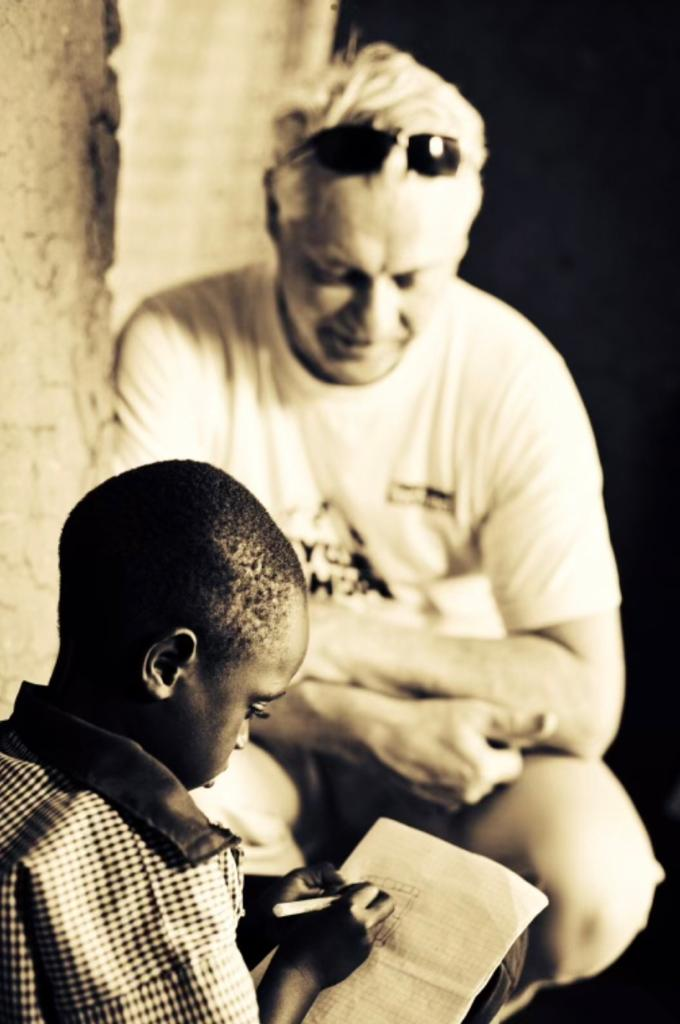
Ross in Gashora, Rwanda

Ross Wilson (born 1958) is an artist from Northern Ireland. He studied Fine Art at the University of Ulster and at the Chelsea College of Art and Design.

== Biography ==
He graduated with a First-Class Honours degree in fine art from the Ulster University and went on to receive his master's degree from the Chelsea School of Art in London.

He has been a visiting speaker at Harvard University, Magdalen College (Oxford), Jesus College (Cambridge) and Wheaton College (Chicago) and the National Portrait Gallery (London). He was recently invited as a guest speaker by Members of Congress at the President's "National Prayer Breakfast" in Washington DC.

Wilson's portrait commissions have included Nobel Laureates Derek Walcott and Seamus Heaney for the National Portrait Gallery, the Russian poet Joseph Brodsky, and the American playwright Arthur Miller.

Wilson's work has also been showcased and sold at both Christie's and Sotheby's in London.

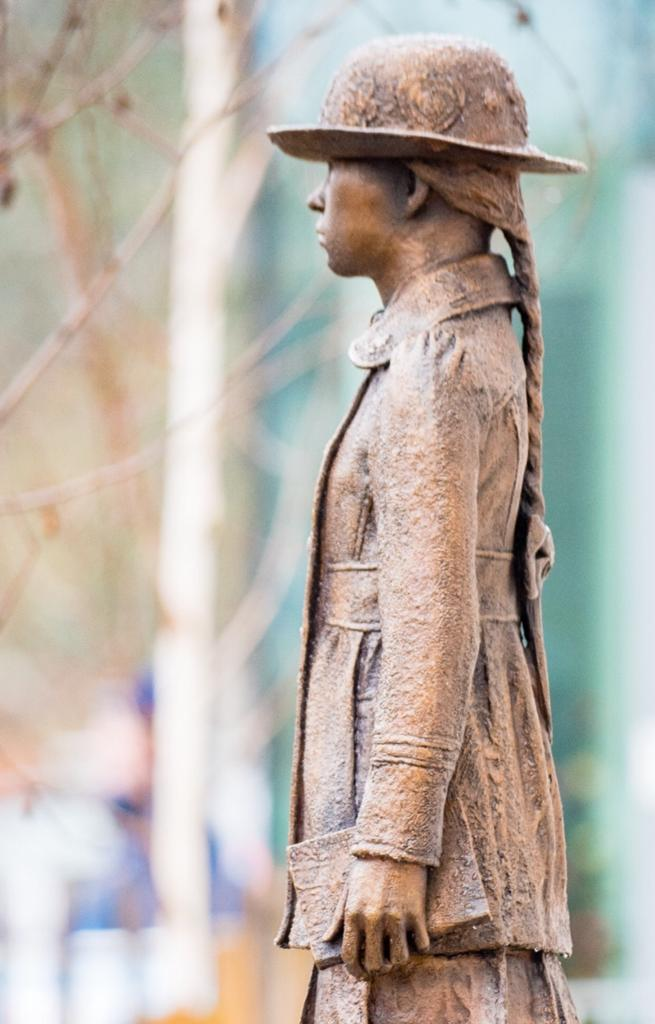
'Amy Carmichael' – Social reformer, child advocate and missionary – Bangor

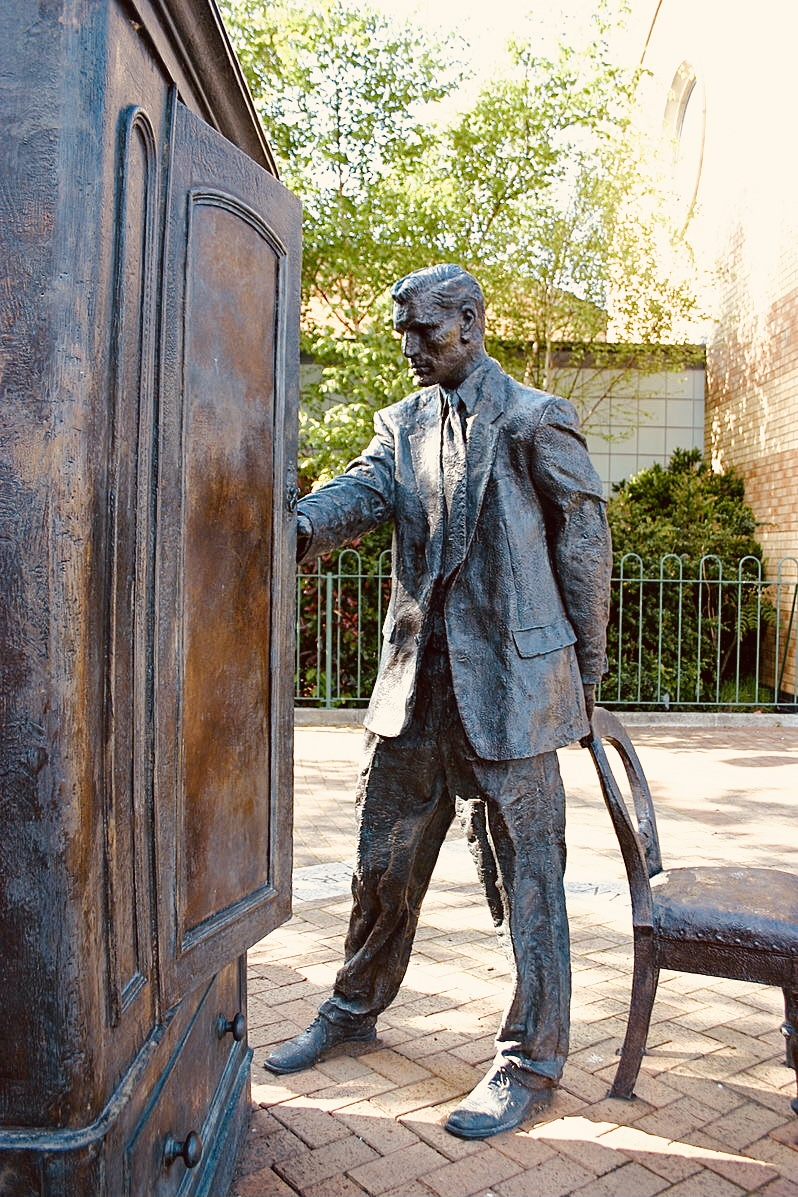
'The Searcher' – C.S. Lewis Centenary Sculpture – Belfast, the birth place of CSL

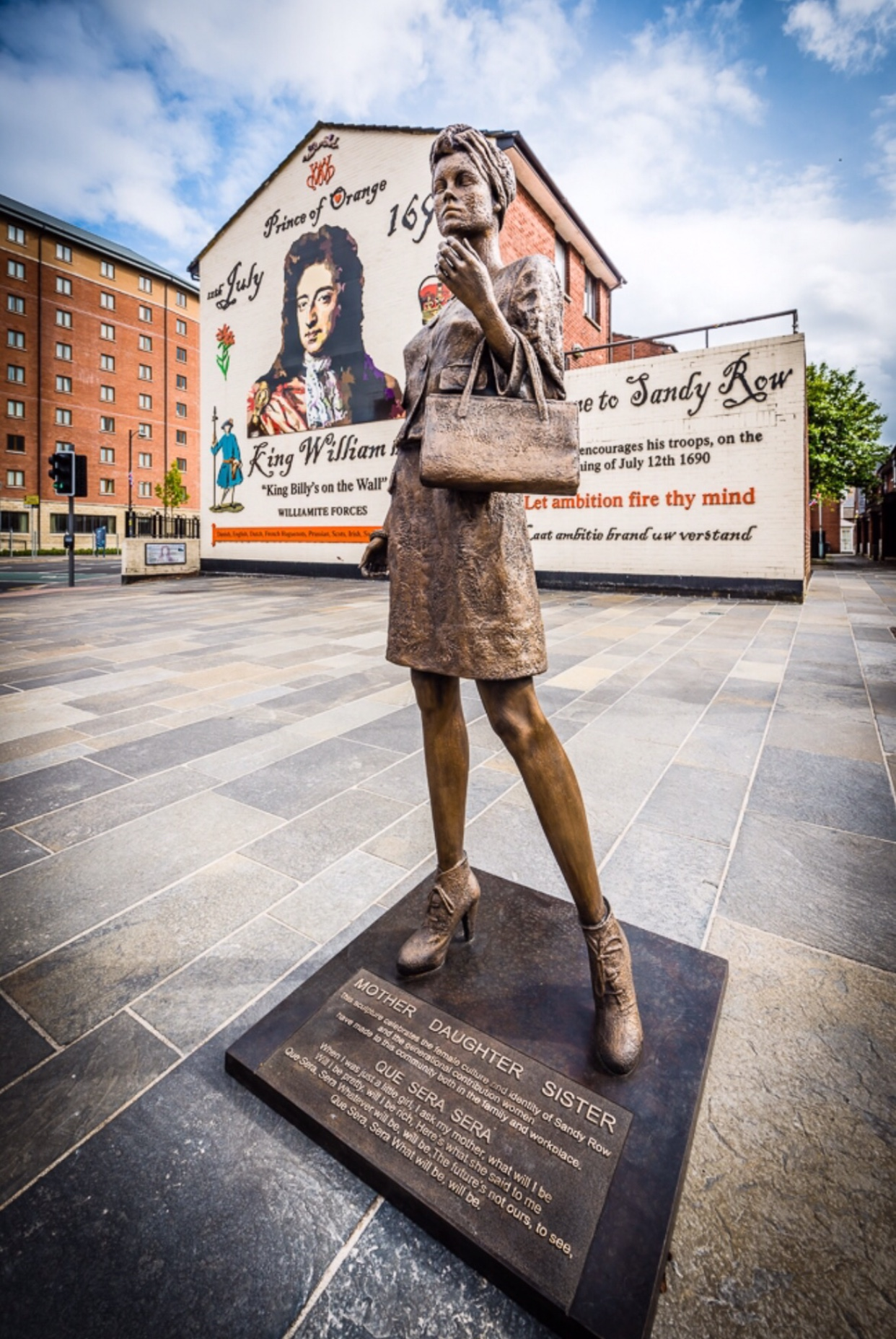
'Mother - Daughter - Sister' – Women in Community – Sandy Row, Belfast

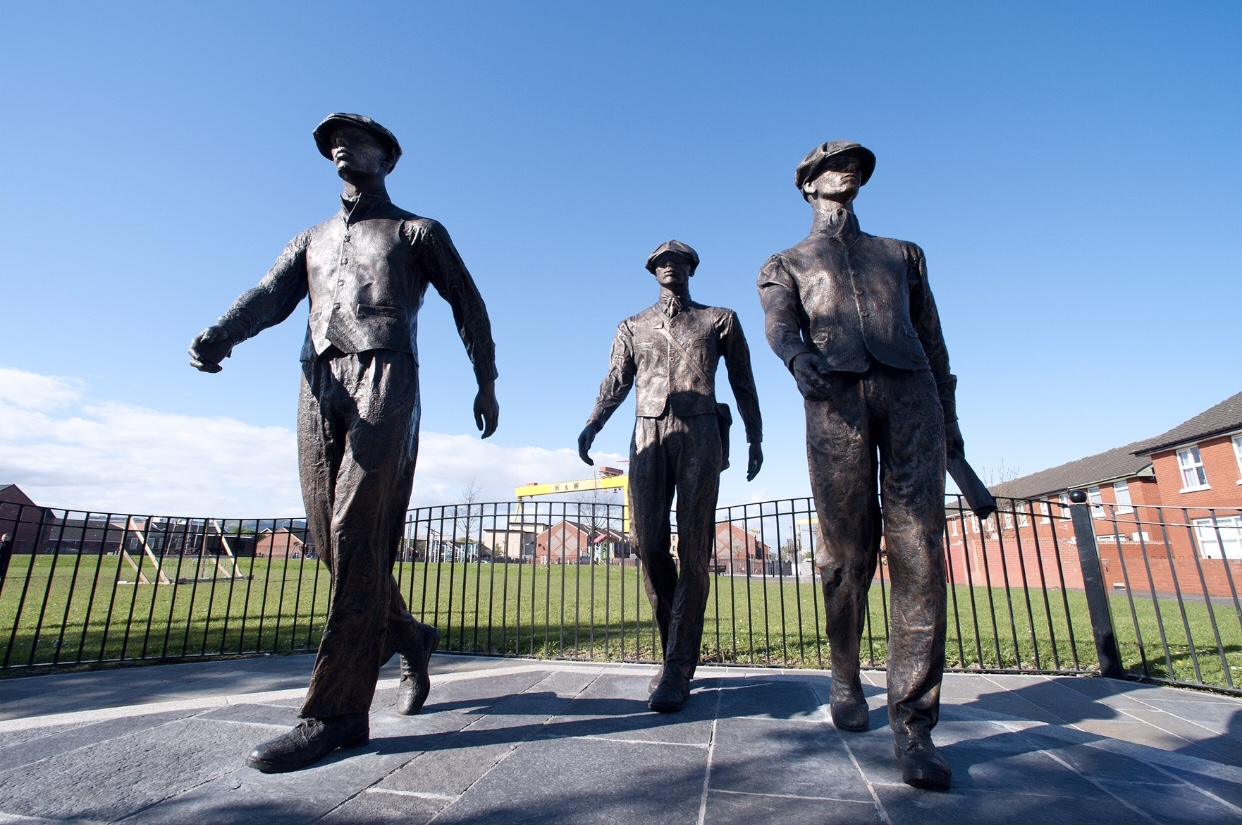
'The Yardmen' – Titanic Community Centenary Project, Belfast
