= John Kindness =

Irish artist (born 1951)

John Kindness (born 1951) is an Irish artist working a range of media including sculpture and painting. His work often contrasts material, image and reference in an unusual and humorous way.

Kindness was born in Belfast, Northern Ireland. He attended the Belfast College of Art and now lives and works in London.

Typical of Kindness's work is the Treasures of New York series he produced when he spent time in New York in the early 1990s. Here, scenes inspired by contemporary life but modelled in style on Athenian ceramics are painted on panels from New York yellow cabs, equating the significance and stature of contemporary life with that of classical times. He is also known for his use of tiles in sculpture, often contrasting the domestic and static association of tiling with a dynamic and epic subject.

In 2014, he received an Individual Support Award from the Adolph and Esther Gottlieb Foundation.

== Work in collections or on display ==
- A Mummer's Banquet (2019), Clone Learning Centre at Hillsborough Castle.
- Odysseus (2012), Galway Arts Festival
- The Labor Monument: Philadelphia's Tribute to the American Worker (2010), Elmwood Park, Philadelphia (commissioned by the Association for Public Art)

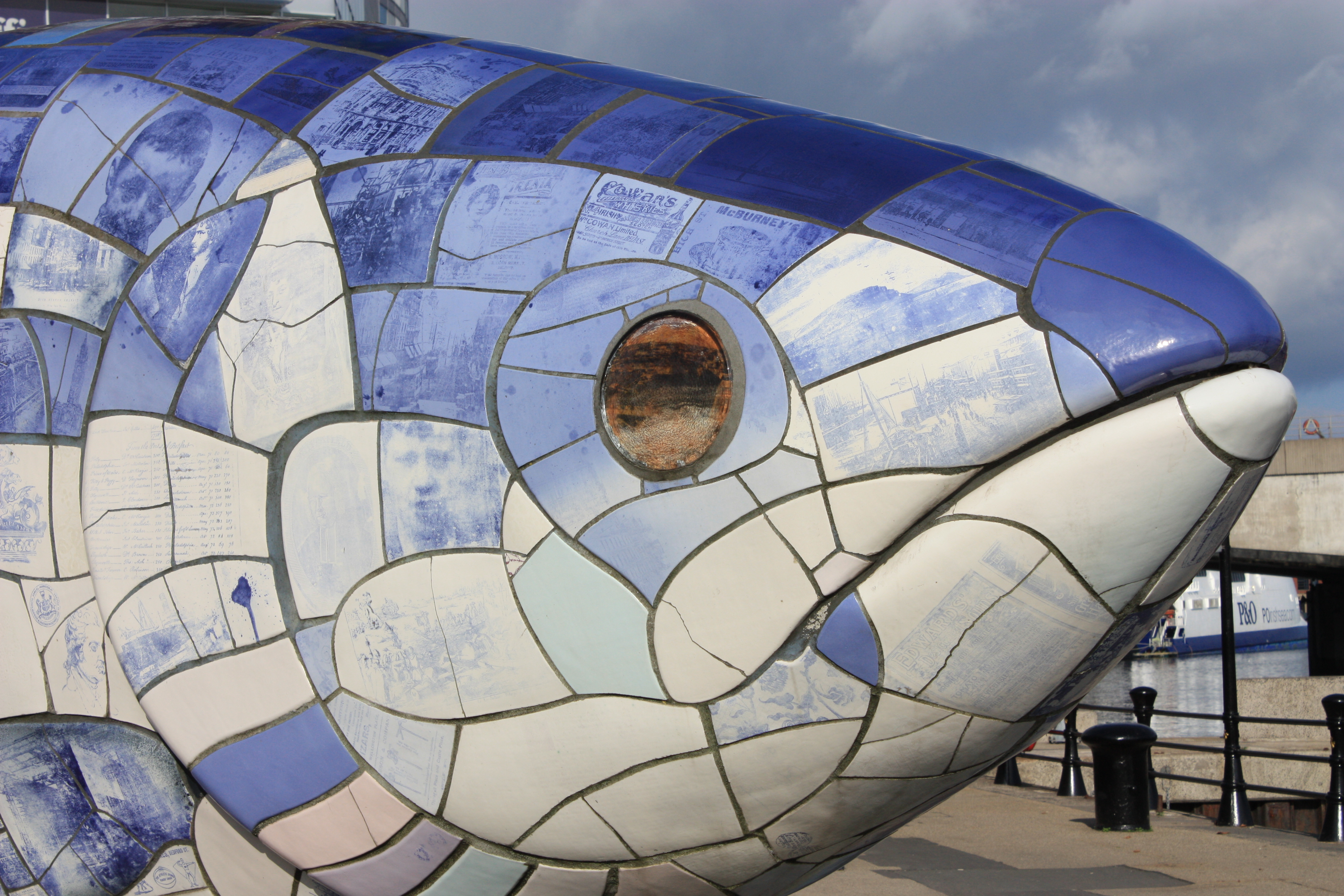
The Big Fish, Belfast, October 2009

- The Big Fish (1999), Donegall Quay, Belfast
- Romulus and Seamas (1992), F.E. McWilliam Gallery, Banbridge.
- Waterfall of Souvenirs (1991), (removed/missing 12 February 2022)
- The Art Council of Northern Ireland, including:
  - Hermes (1990)
- The Victoria and Albert Museum, London
- The Irish Museum of Modern Art, Dublin
- The Boston Museum of Fine Art, Boston
- The Ulster Museum, Belfast, including:
  - The Belfast Frescoes
- The Imperial War Museum, London, including:
  - Sectarian Armour (1994)
- The Hugh Lane Municipal Gallery, Dublin, including:
  - Monkey and Dog (1986)
- The Arts Council of Ireland:
  - Winged Sneaker (1990)
  - Design for a New Bridge Across the River Liffey

== See also ==
- List of Northern Irish artists
