= Penrose House =

Historic building in Cork, Ireland

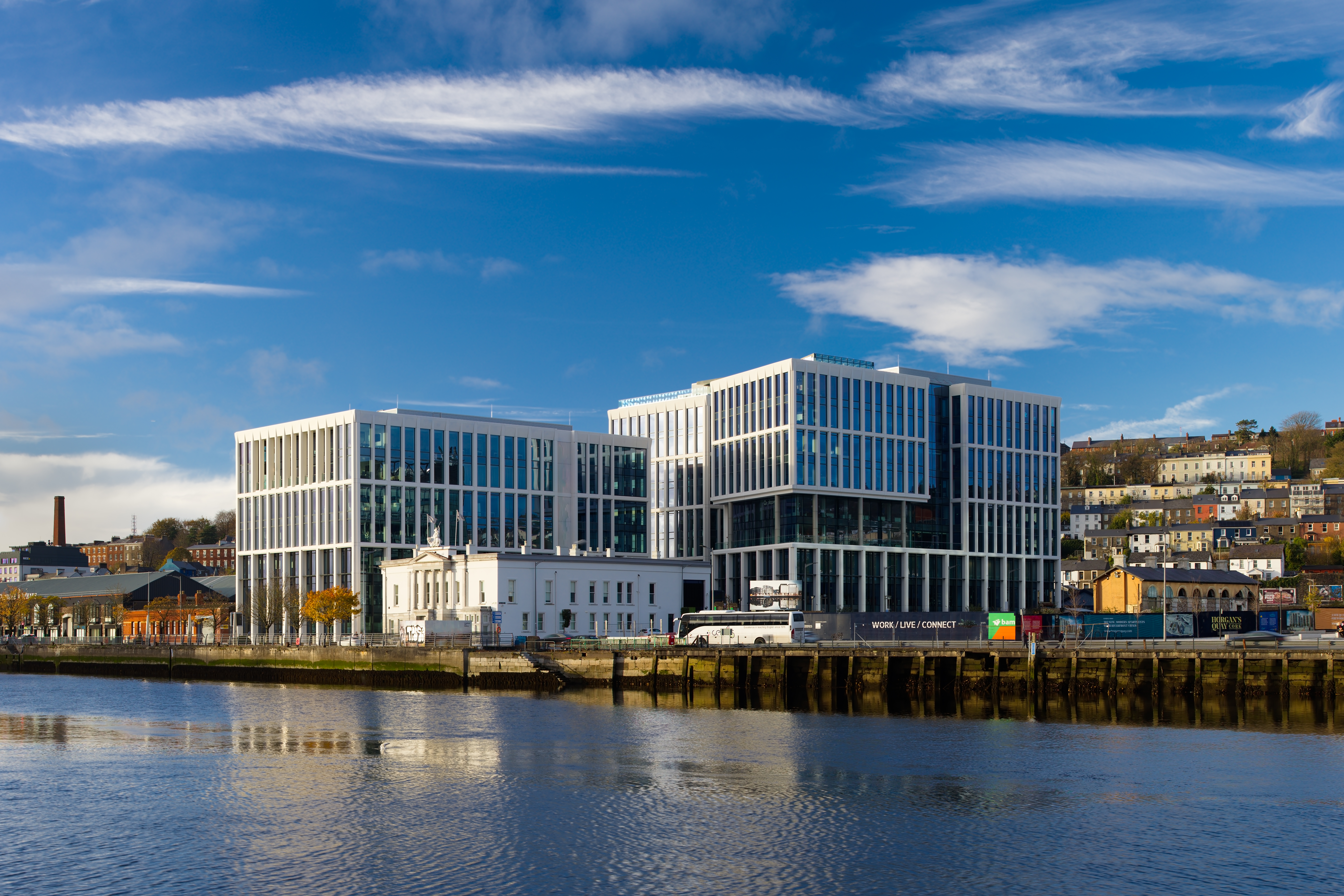
- Penrose House (smaller white building in the middle) in Cork's Horgan's Quay, dominated by surrounding new development called Penrose Dock (the larger modern building)

- Location within Ireland

General information
- Status: Commercial building
- Type: House
- Architectural style: Neoclassical
- Location: Cork, County Cork, Ireland
- Coordinates: 51.90023°N 8.46171°W
- Completed: c. 1833
- Renovated: 1998

Technical details
- Material: granite and limestone

Penrose House is a historic building in Penrose Quay, Cork, Ireland. Built in neoclassical style, it is prominently located on the northern bank of the River Lee.

Penrose House was designed by George R. Pain of the Pain brothers and the construction started in 1832. Built of granite and limestone, the five-bay structure has two storeys. Some of the façade elements, including a frieze and a bay to the right of the entrance, were added over the years, and many 19th century features have been preserved, including the sculpture of St. George defeating a dragon on the top of the portico, four marble columns, as well as timber carvings and staircase.

== Historic significance ==
Historically the building served various maritime enterprises, including its first tenant St. George Steam Packet Company founded in 1825, the City of Cork Steam Packet Company, and the southern headquarters of B&I Steam Company, and among other things tickets for emigrant transatlantic journeys on ocean liners were sold there. Because of its role and first tenants, the building was long referred to as the "Steampacket Office". Marine vessels, including large ones like one of the Innisfallen ships, would moor directly in front of the building.

== Modern development ==
Penrose House was renovated in 1998. Windows were replaced, plasterwork repaired, and the facade painted in white. Following a period of rentals to various commercial and non-profit tenants, the building with its 10,000 sq. ft. letting area was put up on sale on a private market in 1999 with the expectation of gaining prominence due to the planned development at the nearby Horgan's Quay. The building was sold in 2000 for close to 1 million pounds. Following approval by the Cork City Council in 2018, in the early 2020s commercial development was carried out in the areas within the curtilage of the protected historic building. Modern office buildings, named Penrose Dock, were raised in the direct vicinity of Penrose House, dominating over it from western and northern side. The concerns that the buildings would make the Penrose House appear "diminutive and insignificant" were dismissed. The architects Wilson Architecture who won an international architecture award for the two new blocks adjacent to Penrose House, also oversaw conservation and renovation of the historic building which is said to have served as an inspiration in the designing of the new blocks. Work on the rear portion including installing of insulation and floors while retaining old stone and brick finishes, and roof beams. Modern lighting, heating, air conditioning and lifts were installed. Penrose House itself also gained new high-profile tenants, including real-estate company Savills.
