= Titanic Kit =

Sculpture in Belfast, Northern Ireland

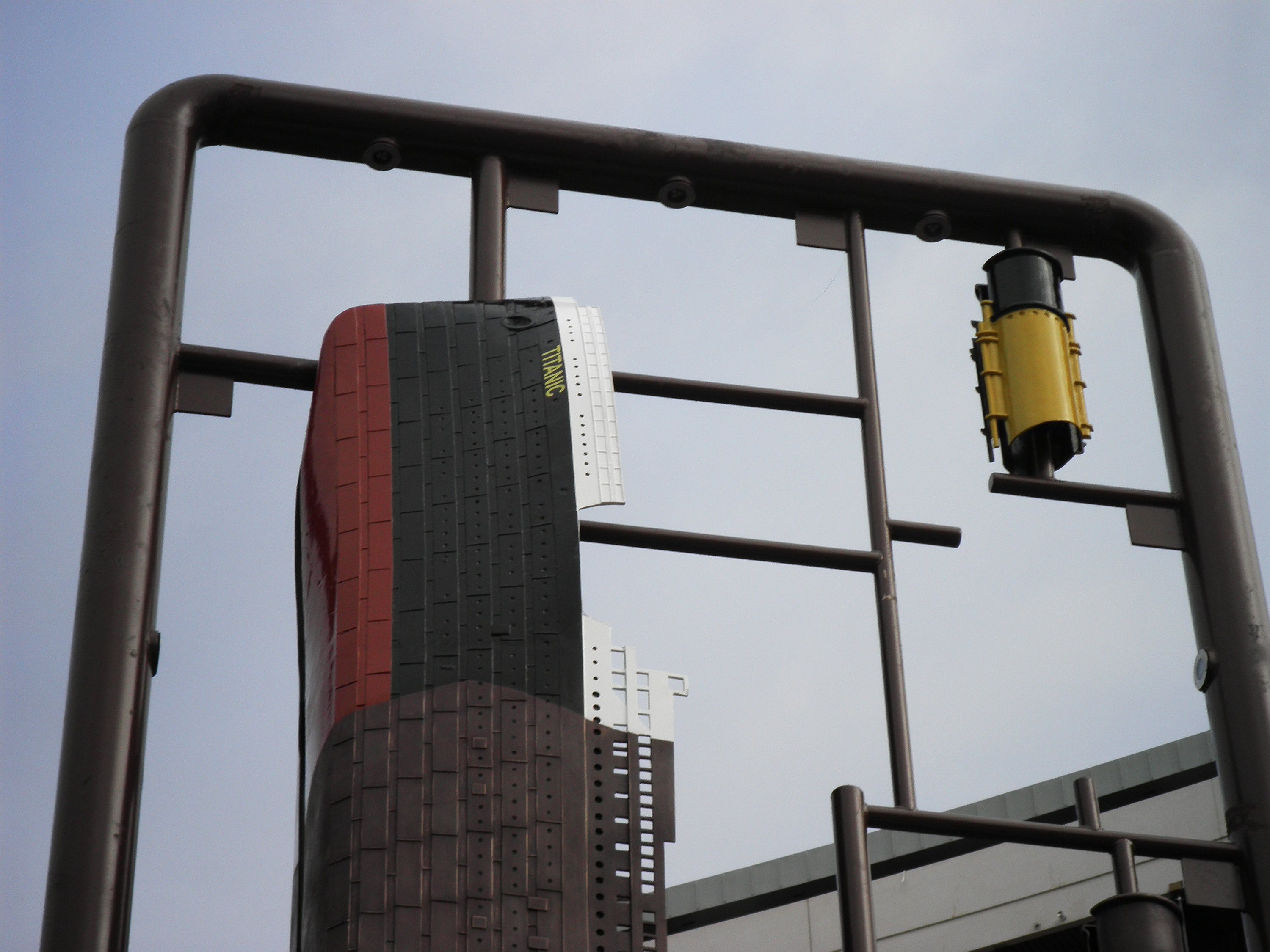
- Titanic Kit, October 2009

- Location within Northern Ireland

General information
- Type: Artwork
- Location: Titanic Quarter, Northern Ireland, BT3; United Kingdom BT3 9FD
- Coordinates: 54.604880°N -5.912590°E
- Construction started: 2008
- Completed: 2009

Design and construction
- Architect: Tony Stallard (artist)

The Titanic Kit is a contemporary sculpture, designed by Tony Stallard, located in the Titanic Quarter in Belfast, Northern Ireland, United Kingdom.

Completed in 2009, Kit is a bronze-and-steel sculpture of the RMS Titanic, 14 metres tall and 4 metres wide. The work is located on the quayside of the Abercon Basin, which is now known as Belfast Harbour Marina.

== Concept ==
According to Stallard, the artwork would symbolize the importance of Belfast as an industrial pioneer during the era when the Titanic was constructed. In addition, the sculpture would serve as a contemporary tribute as such to the shipbuilders and the shipbuilding industry. As a result, the piece is see-through to invoke a feeling of mythology and transience. Reference is also made to kit forms and toy structures, an attempt to bring the spirit of the ship back to the beginning of her journey.

== Construction ==
Work began on the project in 2008, and cost £200,000. The project was funded jointly by the Titanic Quarter and Arts And Business Northern Ireland. The work was completed and unveiled in November 2009.

The scale of the project meant that the sculpture underwent a complex and lengthy design process. This was a collaboration between engineers, architects and local stakeholders.

Kit takes the form of an oversized Airfix model kit and has a number of components recognizable as parts from the RMS Titanic. The structure of the artwork gives the illusion that pieces have been broken off for its construction. In recognition of its history, the original shipbuilders of the RMS Titanic, Harland & Wolff were commissioned to build the sculpture.

== See also ==
- Tony Stallard
- Titanic Quarter
