= The Frankenstein Project (sculpture) =

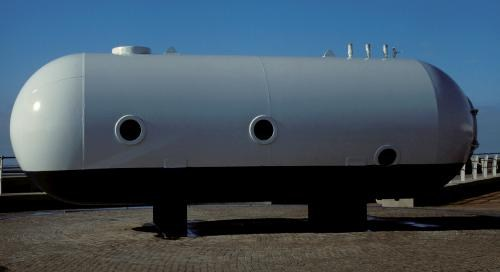
- The Frankenstein Project, November 2001

- Location within Blackpool

General information
- Type: Artwork
- Location: Blackpool Promenade, Lancashire, England
- Coordinates: 53.815884°N 3.055291°W
- Completed: 2001

Design and construction
- Architect: Tony Stallard (artist)

The Frankenstein Project is a contemporary sculpture by Tony Stallard, located on the Blackpool Promenade in Lancashire, England.

The work was permanently installed in 2001, and consists of a divers decompression chamber. Inside the chamber is a blue neon light which illuminates the skeletons and killer whale skull inside the chamber.

== Construction ==
The Frankenstein Project was executed as part of a four-part art scheme commissioned by Blackpool Council and a number of other art companies at a cost of £500,000, under the name of the Great Promenade Show. Implementation of the piece took six years in total and was Stallard's biggest project to date. Weighing seven tonnes, the piece consists of twenty-four foot long gas tank, donated by British Gas, with a replica killer whale inside. Portholes on the side of the tank allow visitors to peer inside the illuminated tank.

== Controversy ==
Stallard acknowledged that the piece would invite debate and the piece did indeed draw the most varied critical response. Despite being one of four new features on the promenade, The Frankenstein Project received most reaction.

In addition, the sculpture was the victim of persistent vandal attacks which required significant repairs and eventually caused the site of the artwork to be redeveloped and moved back to its location.

== See also ==
- Tony Stallard
- Blackpool
