= Albert Power (sculptor) =

Irish sculptor (1881–1945)

- Born: Albert George Power; 16 November 1881; Dublin, Ireland
- Died: 10 July 1945 (aged 63); Dublin
- Occupation: Sculptor
- Spouse: Agnes Kelly (m. 1903)
- Children: 10 including May Power and James Power

Albert George Power (16 November 1881 – 10 July 1945) was an Irish sculptor in the academic realist style. He is particularly known for his iconic statue of the Irish writer Pádraic Ó Conaire.

== Early life and family ==
Albert George Power was born at 8 Barrack Street (now Benburb Street) in Dublin on 16 November 1881. His parents were Mary (née Atkins), an embroideress, and Henry Power, watchmaker. He had one older brother, and one younger sister. He attended a Christian Brothers national school in North Brunswick Street. As a child he played in local clay brickyards and sculpted busts of his friends. After finishing his primary school education, he trained with a firm of sculptors run by Edward Smyth. In 1884 he enrolled as an evening pupil at the Dublin Metropolitan School of Art (DMSA), later attending as a full-time student from 1906 to 1911. During his time at the DMSA he was taught and strongly influenced by John Hughes, Oliver Sheppard and William Orpen. Power won a number of prizes during his time at the DMSA, including medals, 3 scholarships, book prizes, and the national gold medal for the best modelling of a nude figure, in Ireland, Scotland, and the Channel Islands in 1911.

Power married Agnes Kelly in 1903.The couple had 10 children, 4 daughters and 6 sons, including May and James who also became sculptors.

== Career ==
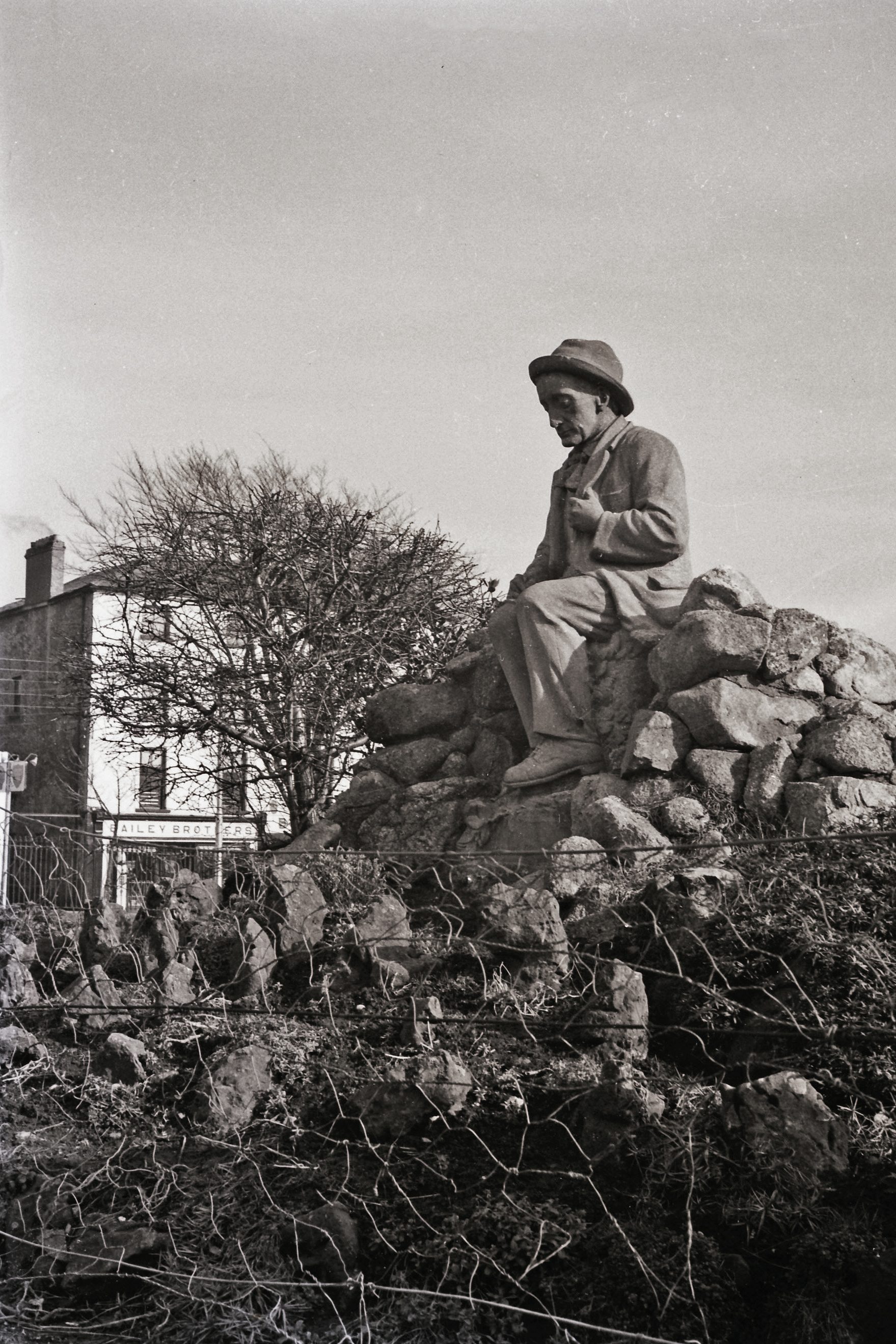
Statue of Pádraic Ó Conaire by Power that stood in Eyre Square, Galway. Now in Galway City Museum

Power established his own stone-carving business in 1912 from his new home at 18 Geraldine Street, Phibsborough. As the firm grew, it moved to premises nearby at 15 Berkeley Street from 1930. Power executed a wide range of works, including monuments and architectural features in bronze, marble, and stone. Among is notable works are the figure of "Science" designed by Sheppard from the façade of the new Royal College of Science (later Government Buildings) on Merrion Street, Dublin, carved motifs and sphinxes for the Gresham Hotel, O'Connell Street, and 4 statues on the dome of Christ the King church, Carndonagh.

Power was considered the leading Irish sculptor of the 1920s and 1930s. He was a nationalist and promoted the use of Irish materials such as limestone from Durrow and Connemara marble. He was noted for his academic realist style. He exhibited regularly with the Royal Hibernian Academy from 1906, becoming an associate member in 1911, and a full member in 1919. Among those he modelled sculptures for were James Stephens (1913), W. B. Yeats (1918), and Lord Dunsany (1920). Among his patrons was Oliver St. John Gogarty, and through Gogarty Power was commissioned to model a number of prominent Irish nationalists. Gogarty asked Power to carve a portrait of Terence MacSwiney in 1920, while MacSwiney was on hunger-strike in Brixton prison, London. Smuggled into the prison to do a thumbnail sketch, Power then carved a portrait in the form of a life mask.

On Gogarty's recommendation, Power was commissioned by the Irish Free State governments to create portraits of a number of leading politicians including Arthur Griffith (1922), Michael Collins (1936), and Austin Stack (1939). He was also privately commissioned to execute a portrait of Éamon de Valera in 1944. Among his monumental works were sculptures of Tom Kettle (1919) at St Stephen's Green, Dublin, Christ the King in Gort, Co. Galway, (1933), Pádraic Ó Conaire (1935) at Eyre Square, Galway, and W. B. Yeats (1939) at Sandymount Green, Dublin. He was one of the artists invited to submit designs for the new coinage of the Irish Free State in 1928.

== Death ==
Power died on 10 July 1945 following complications from a double hernia. His body was buried in Glasnevin Cemetery.

== Works ==
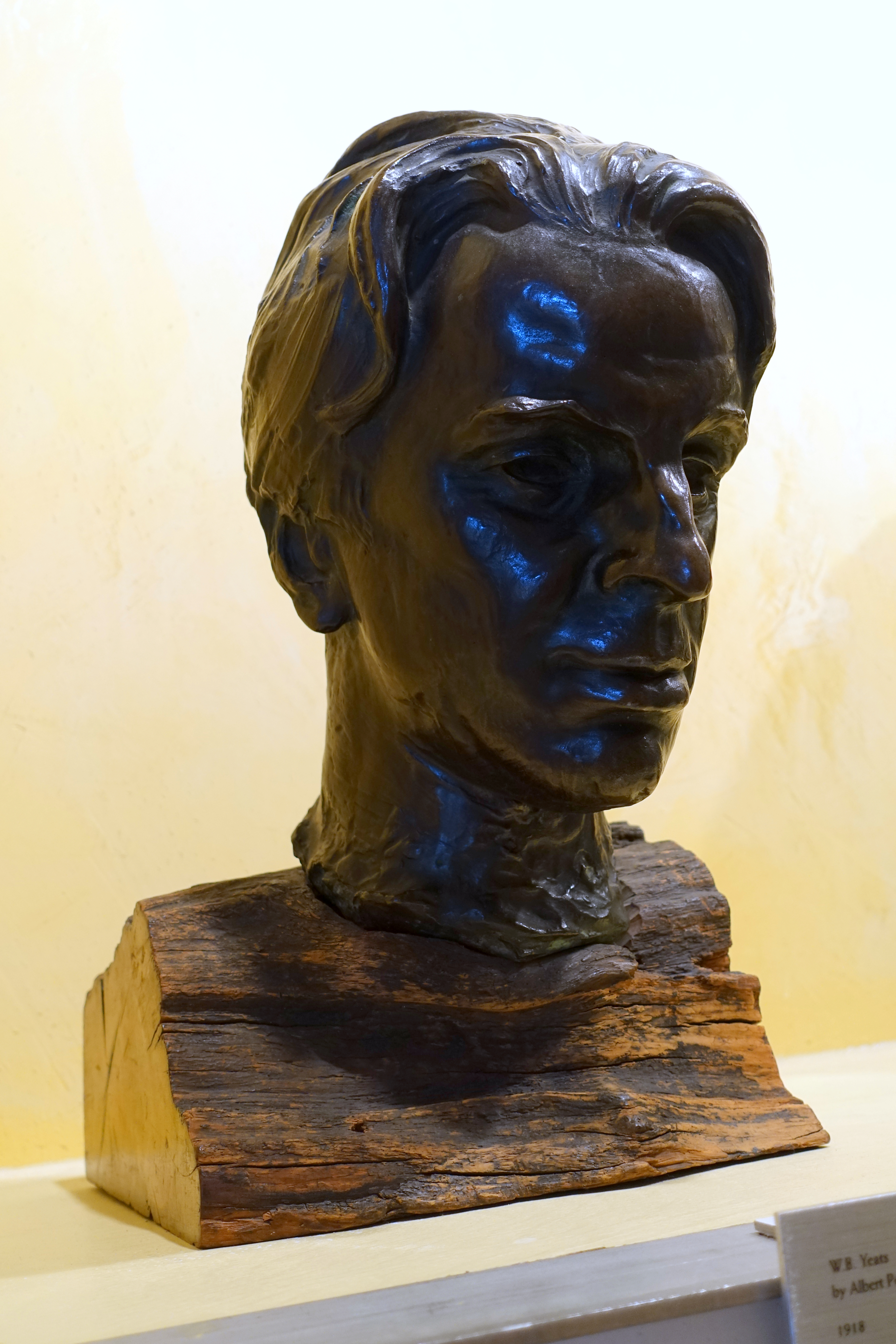
Bust of W. B. Yeats by Power (1918)
Displayed in the Harry Ransom Center, University of Texas at Austin, USA.

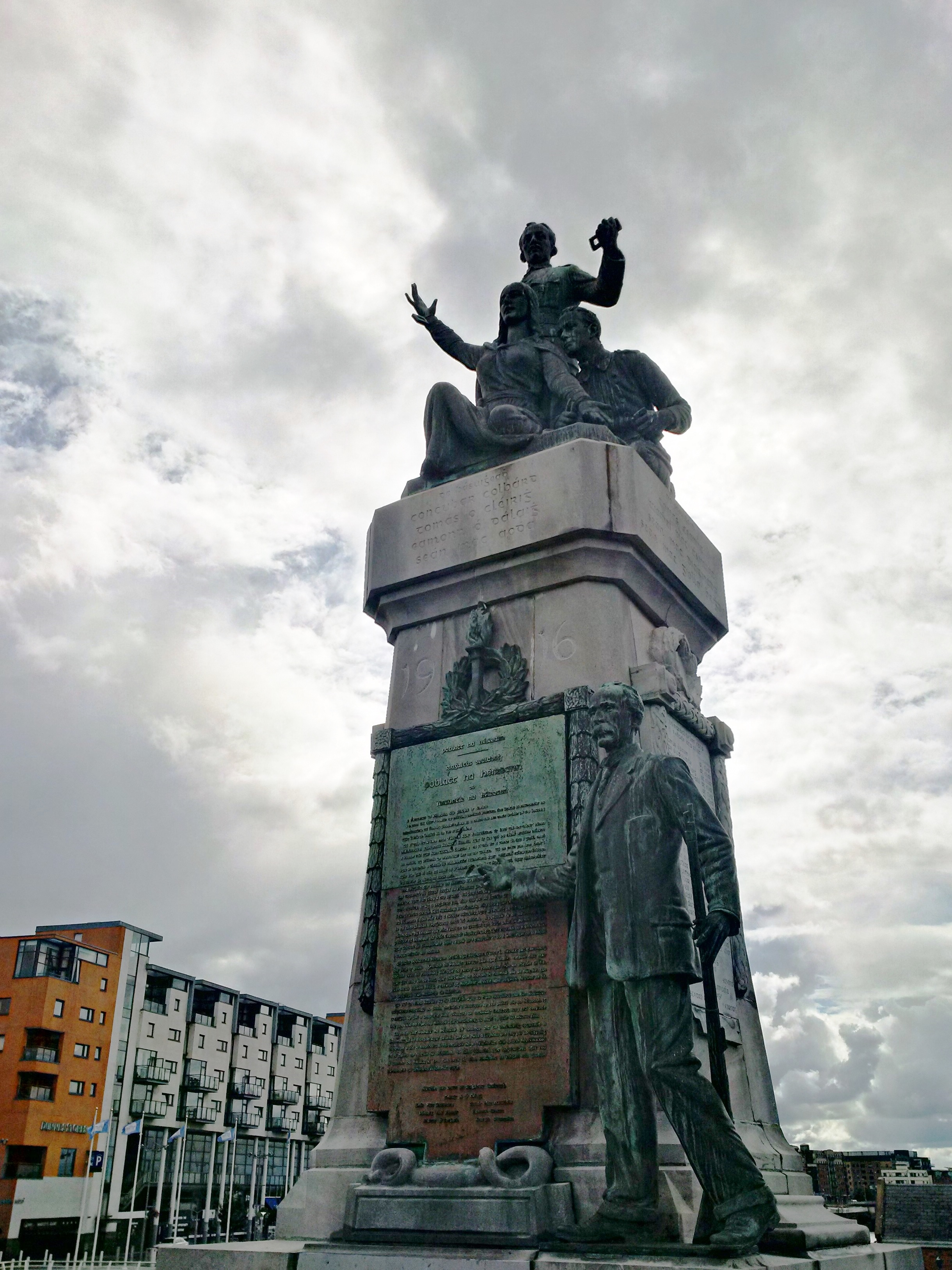
1916 memorial designed by Power
Erected in Limerick, Ireland

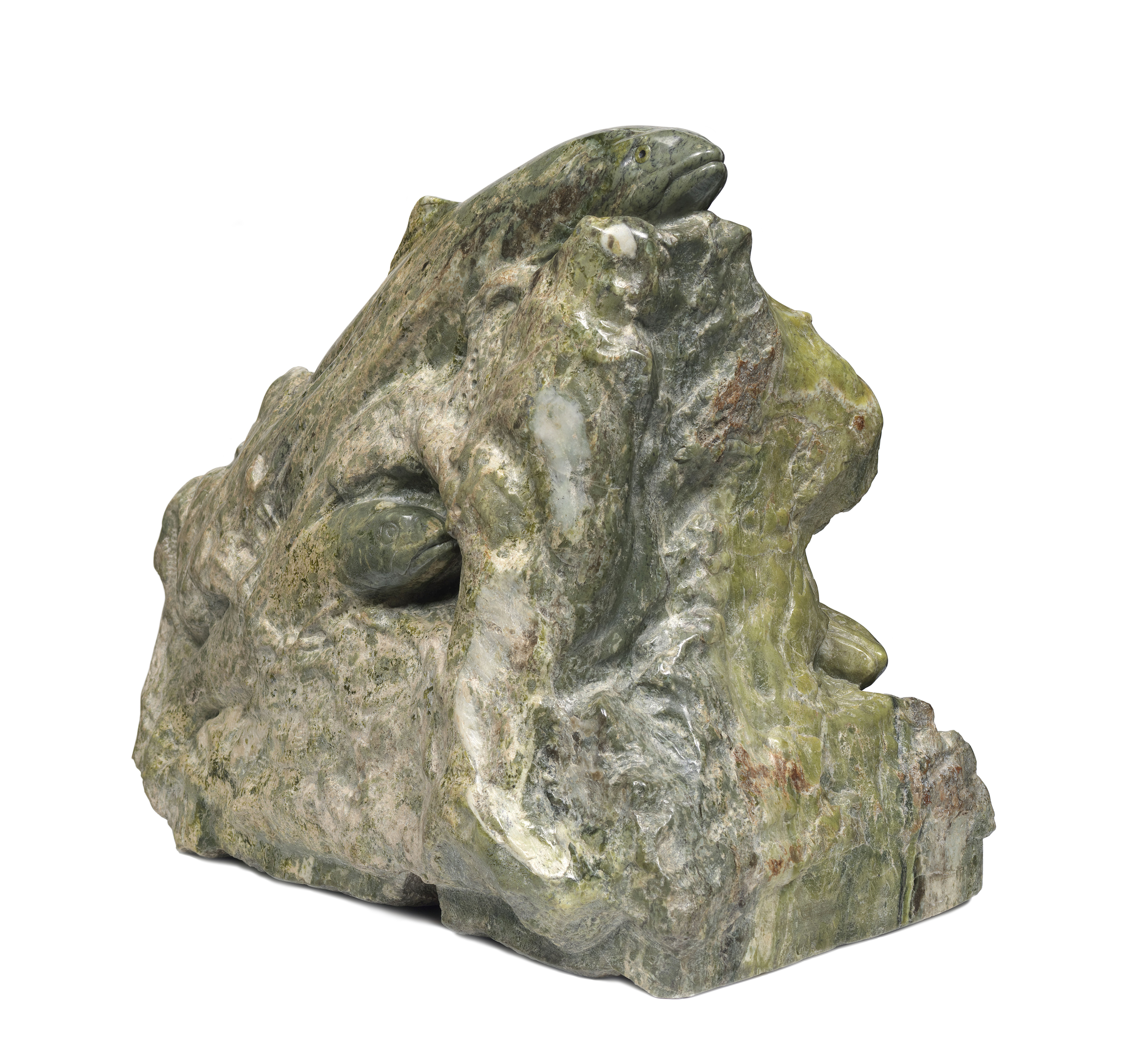
Connemara Trout (1944) by Power, now held in the National Gallery of Ireland

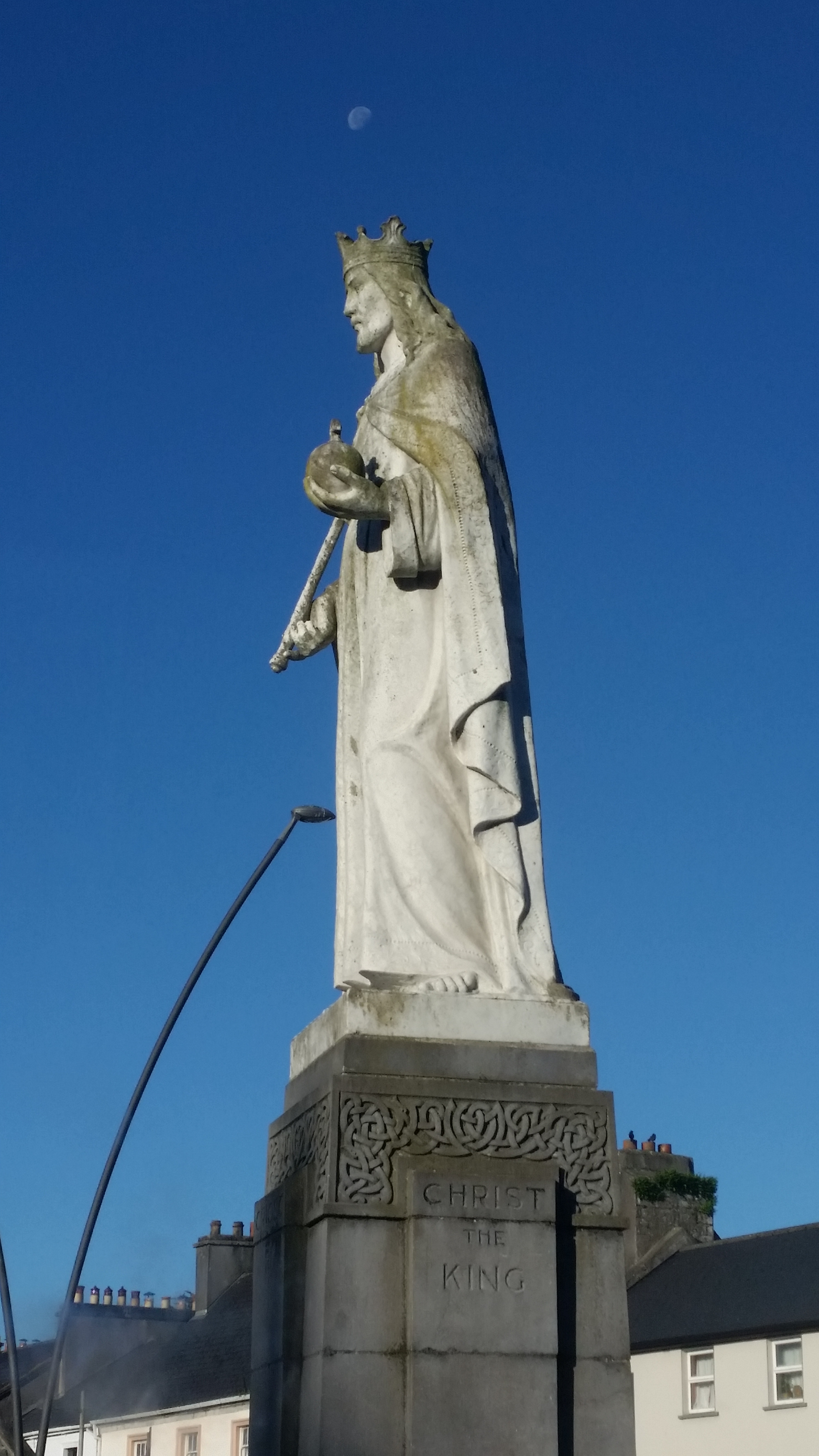
Christ the King in Gort, Co. Galway, marble, 1932.

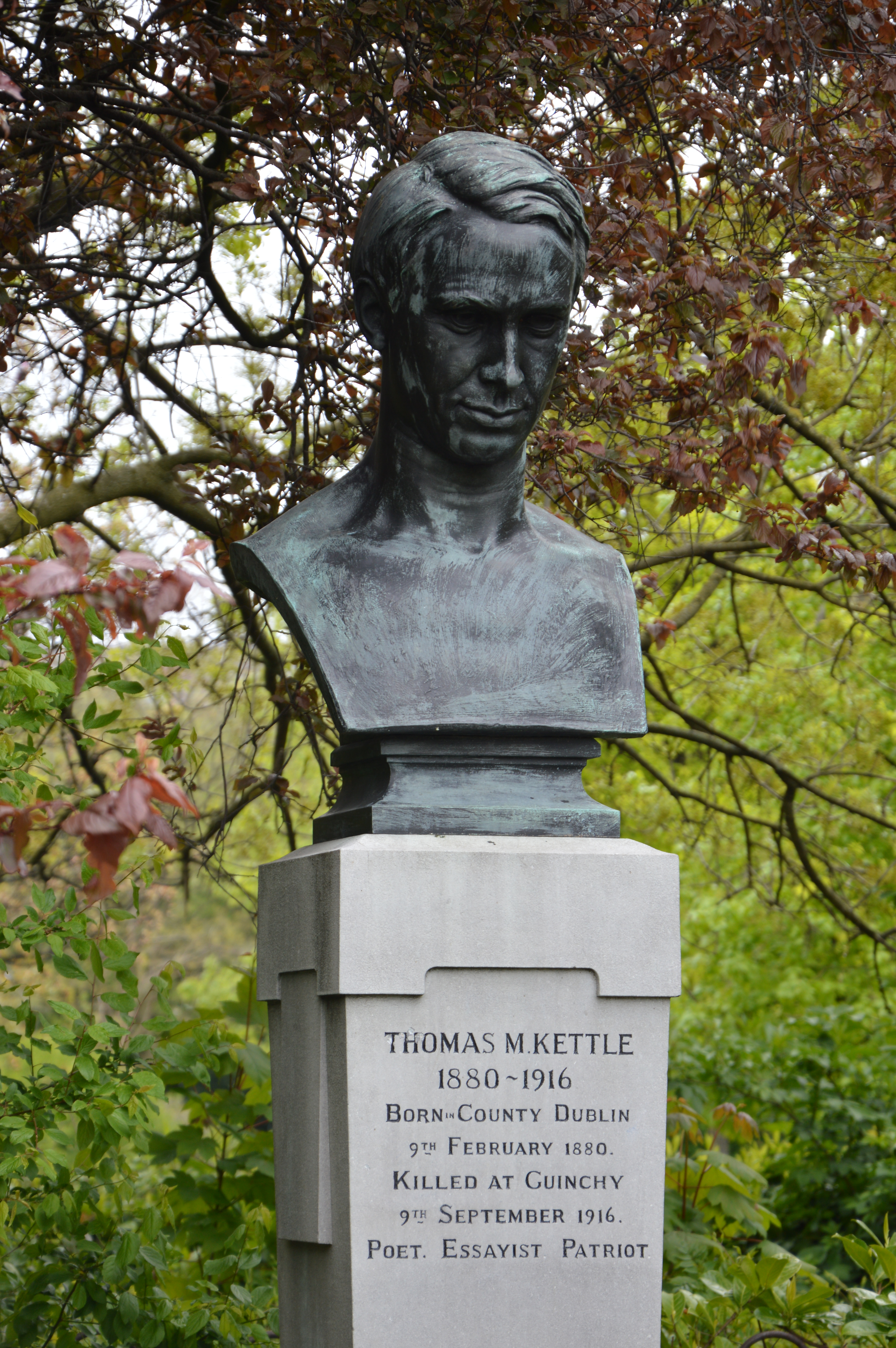
Power's 1919 bust of Thomas M. Kettle in St. Stephen's Green, Dublin.

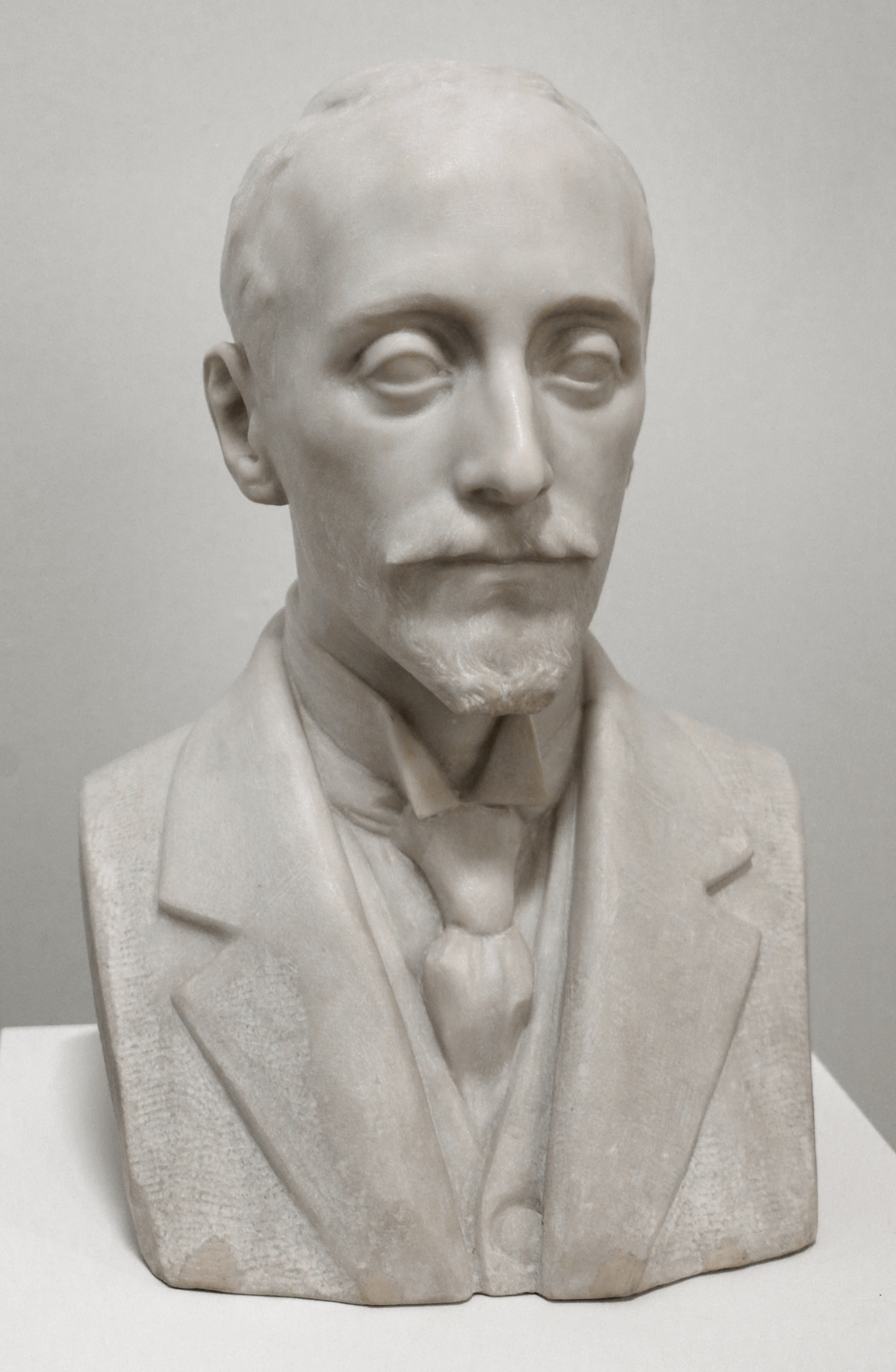
Bust of Hugh Lane, 1933

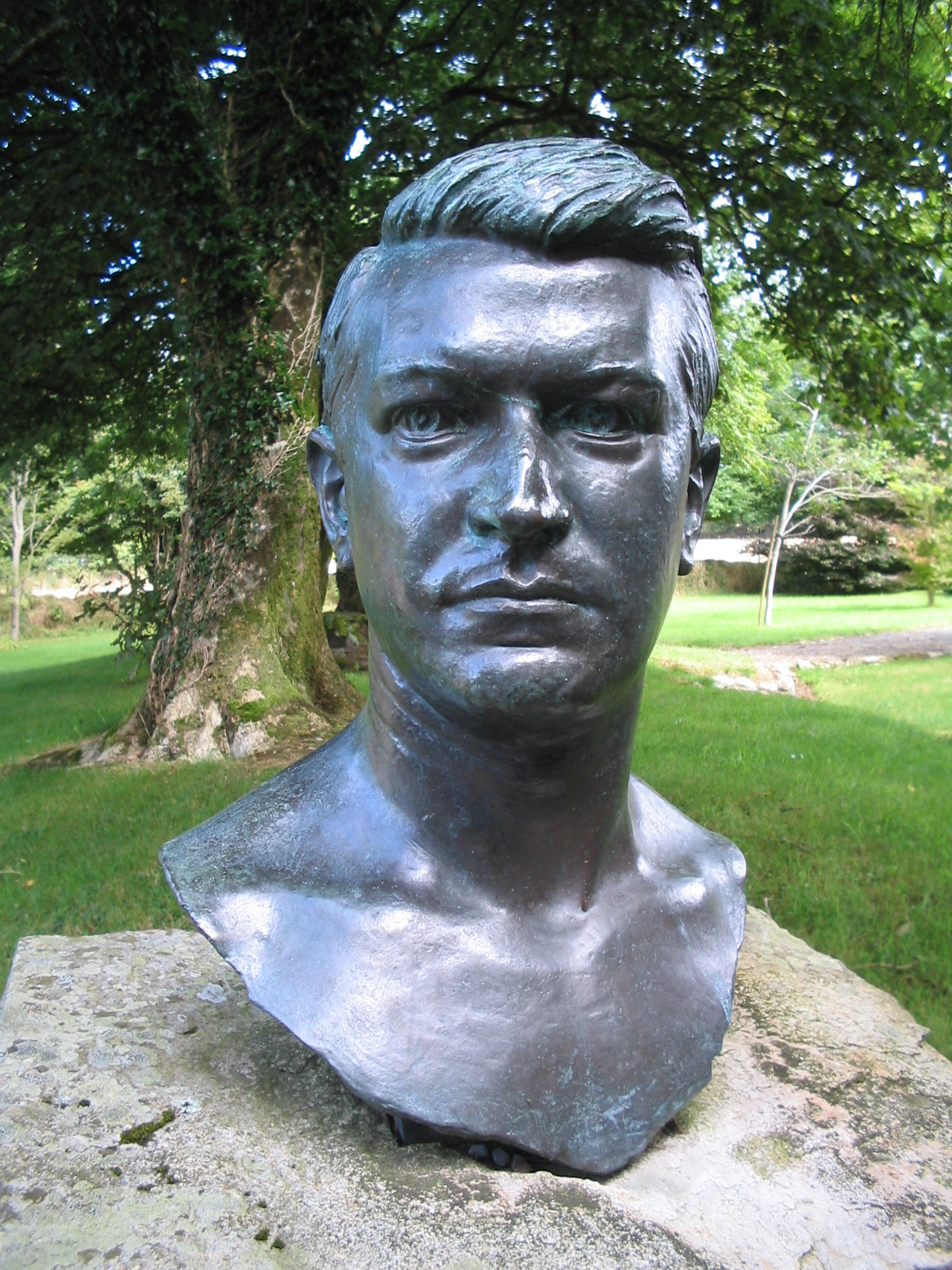
Bust of Michael Collins at the former place of his house of birth (County Cork), 1920's.
