= Michael Quane =

- Born: 1962 (age 63–64); Cork, Ireland
- Education: Crawford School of Art
- Known for: sculpture, equestrian sculpture
- Notable work: Figure Talking to a Quadruped; Horses and Riders; Carbon Sync; Tomás Ó Criomhthain
- Style: direct carving
- Movement: Modern sculpture, modernism
- Children: 2
- Elected: Aosdána (1998); Royal Hibernian Academy (2004)
- Website: michaelquane.com

Michael Quane RHA (/ˈkweɪn/; born 1962) is an Irish sculptor. He is a member of Aosdána, an elite Irish association of artists.

== Early life ==
Quane was born in Cork in 1962. He began to draw and carve wood aged 12 and briefly studied science at University College Cork before transferring to the Crawford School of Art and Design.

== Career ==
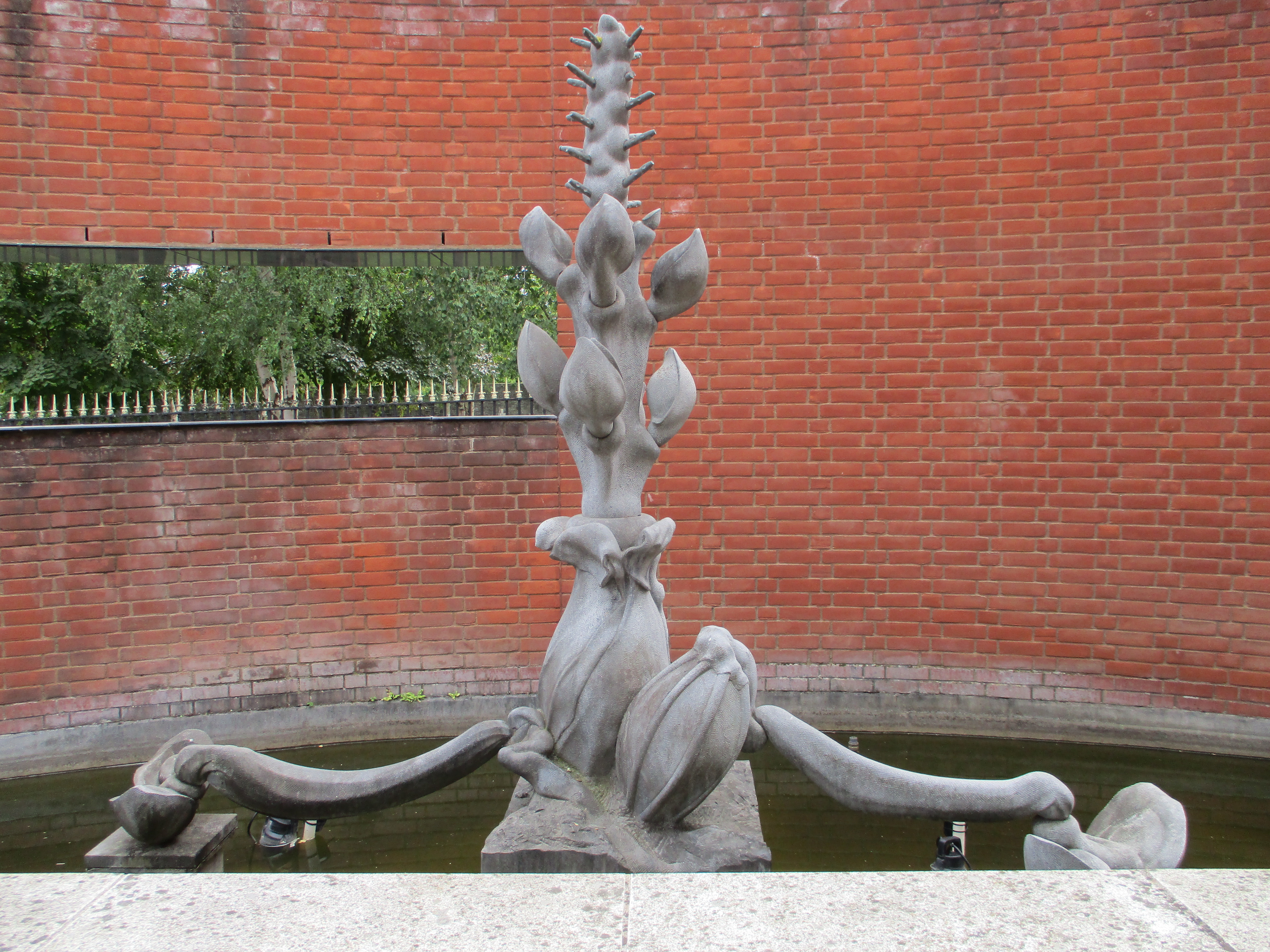
Kingdom of Plants Arising by Quane (National Botanic Gardens, Dublin)

Quane's professional career began in 1987; he was elected to Aosdána in 1998 and the Royal Hibernian Academy in 2004.

Quane works in materials such as elm wood, Kilkenny limestone, marble. Equids feature prominently in his work, inspired in part by a childhood experience of witnessing a donkey dying in a bog. According to Deborah Hickey (The Echo), "Michael’s work rebukes the traditionally classical theme of man’s power over animal. His human figures are anti-heroic as they navigate life with their fellow inhabitants of this planet." Quane practices direct carving, not making models or maquettes.

== Personal life ==
Quane lives in Leap, County Cork. He has two children.
