= List of public art in County Dublin =

This is a list of public art on permanent public display in County Dublin and the city of Dublin in Ireland. The list applies only to works of public art accessible in a public space; it does not include artwork on display inside museums. Public art may include sculptures, statues, monuments, memorials, murals and mosaics.

Public art in Dublin is a significant feature of the cityscape. The city's statues and other monuments have a long history of controversy about their subjects and designs, and a number of formerly prominent monuments have been removed or destroyed. Some of the city's monuments have nicknames, though many are not in popular use.

== North County Dublin ==
Image	Title / subject	Location and coordinates	Date	Artist / designer	Notes
	The Nature Goddess	Millennium Park, Blanchardstown 53.388719°N 6.398475°W	2018	Richie Clarke	
	Circuit	Blanchardstown 53.413917°N 6.362872°W	2026	Alex Pentek	
	Inverted Oil Rig	Father Collins Park, Clongriffin	2012	Alan Phelan	As of September 2020, it has been removed from the lake and is in storage in the park.
	Swans	Pinnock Hill, Swords 53.450278°N 6.225556°W	2017	Brian O'Loughlin	Bog oak sculpture of two swans flying towards the Broadmeadow Estuary with a calla lilly above.
	Thomas Ashe	Lusk	2017	Paul D'Arcy	
	The Raven	Lusk	2005	Bríd Ní Rinn	Bronze
	Torc	Lusk	2003	Liam Rimmer	Bronze sculpture of a torc with two hands clasped.
	Grotesque	Lusk 53.52540°N 6.16656°W	c. 1490	Unknown	Limestone, believed to have been moved from an earlier building.
	Easter Rising Memorial	Lusk	2018		
More images	Men of the Sea	Rush 53.522222°N 6.095°W	2013	Daniel A. Cullen	Twice fired clay.
	M1 Poppies	M1 Lissenhall exit to the R126	2012	Douglas Mooney	5 wind-moved solar-powered illuminated poppies
	Beehive huts	Balbriggan bypass, near the Meath border	2001	Robert McColgan and Irene Benner	Inspired by St. Molach, a beekeeper.
	Open Volumes	Balbriggan	2007	Mark Ryan	
	The Ammonite	Malahide Marina	2000	Niall O'Neill	
	Séamus Ennis	Naul			
	Eccentric orbit	Portmarnock Beach	2002	Rachel Joynt, Remco de Fouw	
	St. Doulagh's Cross	St Doulagh's Church, Malahide Road	Early Medieval	Unknown	
	James Hans Hamilton	Skerries	1870		Hamilton Monument in the shape of an obelisk
	Tidy Towns sculpture	Skerries	2016	Shane Holland	Commemorates Skerries winning the Tidy Towns competition in 2016
	The Skerries and Loughshinny Sea Pole	Skerries	2013	Shane Holland	A memorial for those lost to the sea. The climbable pole was a lifesaving part of the 'Apparatus' system used by the coastguard in the rescuing of ships in distress off the Skerries coast.
	Percy French	Skerries	2008	Bríd Ní Rinn	The view from Skerries inspired Percy French to write The Mountains of Mourne.
	Cormorant	Skerries	2002	Bríd Ní Rinn	
	Terns	Skerries	2004	Bríd Ní Rinn	
More images	May McGee	Floraville Park, Skerries	2025	Helen McLean	
	Embracing Seals	Floraville Park, Skerries	2015	Paul D'Arcy	
	Sculpture in memory of those lost at sea	Floraville Park, Skerries	2015	Angie Grimes	Bronze and Glass
	The Baron of Balrothery	Balrothery Tower	2016	Richie Clarke	Carved Tree Stump

=== Dublin airport ===
Image	Title / subject	Location and coordinates	Date	Artist / designer	Notes
	Hiroshima Memorial Sculpture	Dublin Airport		Vincent Browne	
	Mother and Child	Dublin Airport			
	The Spirit of the Air	Dublin Airport roundabout 53.428370°N 6.229659°W	1991	Richard Enda King	King's design was chosen from 97 entries, and was made from reinforced concrete and Dublin granite. It is 17 m high. In October 1989, Minister for the Environment Pádraig Flynn commented that the sculpture would be "a big attraction to all our visitors who come to visit Ireland – they will see that we are committed to not just the environment, but also to the cultural aspects".
	Forrest Tavern memorial	Dublin Airport, R108 53.431812°N 6.264591°W	1990		Previously located in what is now the North Runway, moved to its current location in 2017.
	Earthmother	Terminal 1 Short Term Car Park C, Dublin Airport 53.429246°N 6.243513°W	unknown	Dick Joynt	
	Turning Point	Terminal 2, Dublin Airport 53.426402°N 6.239861°W	2010	Isabel Nolan	

== Northside suburbs ==
Image	Title / subject	Location and coordinates	Date	Artist / designer	Notes
	Lock Keeper	10th lock, Royal Canal, Ashtown	2007		
	Martin Savage	Ashtown	1948		
	Eyes for You	Balgriffin	2018	Eileen MacDonagh	Wicklow granite sculpture commissioned by Cairn Homes and Dublin City Council. It is circa 3 m high and weighs 5 tonnes.
	Michael Cusack	Croke Park, Jones Road	2011	Paul Ferriter	
	Harry McEntee	St. Margaret's Road			Memorial to Harry McEntee killed during the Irish Civil War.
	Let the Life Flow Through	Ballygall	1996	Elizabeth McLaughlin	
	amaptocare	Ballymun	2003–2006 (and ongoing)	Jochen Gerz	Participative arts project in which members of the public sponsored trees (around 635 in all) to be planted across all neighbourhoods of Ballymun during the regeneration of the area; a plaza and map monumental aspect has yet to be completed.
	Another Sphere	Ballymun	2009	Kevin Atherton	Consists of a pair of stainless steel hemispheres sited in two different parts of Balcurris Park in Ballymun.
	Cathode/Anode	Main Street, Ballymun	2005	Andrew Clancy	
	Misneach	Trinity Comprehensive School, Ballymun	2010	John Byrne	
	Pisces	Chapelizod 53.350793°N 6.353066°W			Located on Kylemore Road near the corner with Lucan Road
More images	Moai sculpture	Clontarf Road	2004	Alejandro Pakarati	Moai is the correct name for an Easter Island statue. Donated by the Government of Chile to the City of Dublin
	Realt na Mára Mary, Queen of the Sea	Bull Wall, Clontarf	1972	Cecil King	
More images	Windsculpture	Clontarf Road / Alfie Byrne Road	1988	Éamonn O'Doherty	
	Sculpture in Mount Temple	Grounds of Mount Temple Comprehensive School	1999	Linda Brunker	
More images	Dancing Couple Stardust fire	Stardust Memorial Park, Coolock	1993	Robin Buick	
	Family Unit 1	Fairview Park	1988	Joe Moran	
More images	Seán Russell	Fairview Park	2009	Willie Malone	Original stone statue 1951
More images	Flags of the Easter Rising	Finglas	2016		
	Liam Mellows	Finglas	2019		
More images	Dick McKee	Finglas Village	1951		
More images	The Nethercross	St. Canice's graveyard, Finglas	9th century		In current location since 1806
	Niche	Finglas Road 53.379986°N 6.288938°W	2007	Orla de Brí	
	The Spirit of Finglas	Finglas village centre	1991	Leo Higgins	
	Finglas Village Clock	Finglas village centre	2018		
	The Bridge Fiacha Dhubha Fhionglaise ar Foluain	Kildonan Park, Finglas 53.392995°N 6.312254°W	2021	Sara Cunnigham-Bell	Finglas Ravens Soar
	Our Lady (Virgin Mary)	Our Lady's Park, Drumcondra	unknown - Marian year 1954?		
More images	The Ready Boat Pillar	Howth Harbour	1996	Sean O'Dwyer	
More images	Howth Fishermens' Association Memorial	Howth Harbour	1994		
	Realt na Mára Star of the Sea	Howth Fishing Pier	2013	Robert McColgan	
	River Run	Phibsborough Public Library, Phibsborough			'River Run' was designed by Dublin City Council Parks and Landscape Services to honour Dublin's designation as a UNESCO City of Literature. It is an element of a quote from James Joyce's Finnegans Wake
	Grass Seed	Saint Anne's Park, Raheny	early 1970s	unknown	
	The Mad Cow	Saint Anne's Park	1996	St. John Hennessy	
	Tree of Life	Saint Anne's Park	2015	Tommy Craggs	Carved out of a dead Monterey cypress
	Phoenix Folly	Santry Demesne 53.402062°N 6.245553°W			
	Temple Folly	Santry Demesne			The original folly was taken from Templeogue house and later moved to Luggala where it remains as a protected structure as of 2023. The current temple is a facsimile of the original.
	Oscar Traynor	Santry	2016		
	Luí-na-Gréine	Carrickbrack Road, near Sutton Strand	Mid 2000s	Cliodhna Cussen	Granite carved Winter Solstice Sunset marking stone and viewing bench
	RMS Tayleur	Portrane			

=== Phoenix Park ===
Image	Title / subject	Location and coordinates	Date	Artist / designer	Notes
More images	Wellington Monument	Phoenix Park	1861	Robert Smirke	
More images	Phoenix Column	Phoenix Park	1747		
More images	Papal Cross Visit by John Paul II to Ireland	Phoenix Park	1979	Paschal Clarke	
	Memorial Cross Phoenix Park Murders	Phoenix Park	1883		
More images	Seán Heuston	Phoenix Park	1943	Laurence Campbell	
	Plinth of former statue of George Howard	Phoenix Park	1870		Statue blown up in 1958
	The People's Acorn (Dearcán na nDaoine)	Áras an Uachtaráin	2017	Rachel Joynt	

=== Farmleigh ===
Image	Title / subject	Location and coordinates	Date	Artist / designer	Notes
	Convergence	Farmleigh	2004	Brian King	Commissioned to celebrate the accession of 10 new states to the EU in 2004
	Statue in Fountain	Farmleigh			Carved carrara marble fountain with putti figures
		Farmleigh		Tony Cragg	
	Éan Mór	Farmleigh		Breon O'Casey	Part of a series of bird statues in bronze and wood
	Remembering	Farmleigh		John Wiedman	Inspired by a machine that made milk substitute for Air Force personnel stationed in Newfoundland, Canada
	Hybrid Vigour	Farmleigh		James Gannon	

=== Glasnevin Cemetery ===
Image	Title / subject	Location and coordinates	Date	Artist / designer	Notes
More images	O'Connell Tower	Glasnevin Cemetery			
	Young Irelanders and Fenians Memorial	Glasnevin Cemetery			
	Great War Monument	Glasnevin Cemetery			
	Easter Rising Necrology Wall	Glasnevin Cemetery	2016		
	Cross of Sacrifice	Glasnevin Cemetery	2014		
	16th Irish Division Memorial	Glasnevin Cemetery	2016		
	Great Famine Memorial	Glasnevin Cemetery	2016		
	1916 Easter Rising Memorial	St Paul's, Glasnevin Cemetery	2016		

=== National Botanic Gardens, Glasnevin ===
Image	Title / subject	Location and coordinates	Date	Artist / designer	Notes
	De Rerum Natura	National Botanic Gardens			Plaque on ground at entrance from carpark
	Between art and nature	National Botanic Gardens	2001	O'Connor	Alternative Latin title 'Inter artes et naturam'
	Socrates	National Botanic Gardens			
	Sepian Blue	National Botanic Gardens	2007	Nasser Azam	
	Kingdom of Plants Arising	National Botanic Gardens		Michael Quane	
	Child and Ball Trough	National Botanic Gardens			
	Craobh	National Botanic Gardens	1995	Gerard Cox	
	Sensory Garden Sculpture	National Botanic Gardens			
	Two Women	National Botanic Gardens			
	Chinese Lion	National Botanic Gardens			
	Double Helix	National Botanic Gardens	2013	Charles Jencks	

== North city centre ==
=== O'Connell Street ===
Image	Title / subject	Location and coordinates	Date	Artist / designer	Notes
More images	Monument to Daniel O'Connell	O'Connell Street 53.347725°N 6.259314°W	1882	John Henry Foley (and later Thomas Brock)	
More images	William Smith O'Brien	O'Connell Street 53.348250°N 6.259538°W	1870	Thomas Farrell	Previously on D'Olier Street from 1870–1929
More images	Sir John Gray	O'Connell Street 53.3485433°N 6.259705°W	1879	Thomas Farrell	
More images	James Larkin	O'Connell Street 53.349085°N 6.259963°W	1980	Oisín Kelly	
More images	Spire of Dublin	O'Connell Street 53.349803°N 6.260249°W	2003	Ian Ritchie Architects	
	Cú Chulainn	GPO, O'Connell Street 53.349334°N 6.261075°W	1911	Oliver Sheppard	Installed at the GPO in 1935
	Easter Rising Plaque	GPO, O'Connell Street			
More images	Father Theobald Mathew	O'Connell Street	1893	Mary Redmond	Removed in 2014 to make way for the Luas extension. Restored in 2018 to new location near The Spire.
More images	Monument to Charles Stewart Parnell	O'Connell Street 53.3525785°N 6.2614683°W	1911	Augustus Saint-Gaudens (statue) and Henry Bacon (obelisk)	
	Cathal Brugha	O'Connell Street	1956	Gabriel Hayes	
	Mr. Screen	Lobby of Savoy Cinema, O'Connell Street	1988	Vincent Browne	Previously on Hawkins Street, outside the Screen Cinema from 1988–2016.
	Paweł Strzelecki	Sackville Place	2015		
More images	Joyce Trail	O'Connell Street (and 13 other locations)	1988	Robin Buick	14 bronze plaques set into the streets of Dublin, commemorating Ulysses (1922)

=== North Quays ===
Image	Title / subject	Location and coordinates	Date	Artist / designer	Notes
More images	Famine Great Famine	Custom House Quay	1997	Rowan Gillespie	
	World Poverty Stone UN International Day for the Eradication of World Poverty	Custom House Quay	2008	Stuart McGrath	The Stone is inscribed with the words "Wealth and Poverty," along with the coordinates of Dublin and an excerpt from a poem by Seamus Heaney. The monument was commissioned by the United Nations World Food Programme (WFP).
More images	Fr. Pat Noise plaque	O'Connell Bridge	2004	unknown	
More images	Meeting Place	Lower Liffey Street 53.346673°N 6.263329°W	1988	Jackie McKenna	Nicknamed "The Hags with the Bags"
More images	Anna Livia The River Liffey	Croppies Memorial Park, Wolfe Tone Quay 53.347716°N 6.290292°W	1988	Éamonn O'Doherty	Previously in O'Connell Street 1988–2001. At Wolfe Tone Quay since 2011. "The Floozie in the Jacuzzi"
	Fountain at Croppies Memorial Park	Croppies Memorial Park, Wolfe Tone Quay 53.347604°N 6.290676°W	1983	unknown	Financed by a £7,000 donation from the Dublin Chamber of Commerce to mark their bicentenary. Stones cut from Wolfe Tone quay wall during the installation of Frank Sherwin Bridge were used for the fountain pool's retaining wall.
More images	1798 Rebellion Bicentennial memorial	Croppies Acre Memorial Park 53.347482°N 6.285936°W	1998	Edward Delaney	Includes a full inscription of the poem 'Requiem for the Croppies' by Seamus Heaney
More images	1798 Memorial Stone	Croppies Acre Memorial Park 53.347232°N 6.287608°W	1985	unknown	Erected by Soldiers of the Eastern Command, Irish Army
	Rutland Fountain, Barrack Street	Rutland Fountain, Barrack Street	1785	unknown	Erected in 1785 as a drinking fountain on Barrack Street (now Benburb Street) and moved inside the Royal Barracks (now Collins Barracks) in 1889 where it remains today.
	Flow	North Wall, Dublin in front of Dublin Landings	2008	Martin Richman	Recalls the banded wrapping of the freight containers that would have been shipped into this part of the River Liffey. It was commissioned by the Dublin Docklands Development Authority in 2008 to animate the Bord Gáis above Ground Installation (AGI), which is in fact a depressurisation installation for the distribution of gas within the North Lotts area in the Docklands.
	A Double Rainbow	Dublin Landings back of Central Bank of Ireland	2022	Eva Rothschild	
	Restless: Liffey Love	North Wall, Dublin	2024	Rhona Byrne	Benches made of recycled plastic recovered from the River Liffey.
More images	Triumphal arch	George's Dock near river Liffey	1813, repositioned 1998	Unknown	Rusticated limestone ashlar arch built in 1813 and until 1998 stood in Amiens Street until it was relocated to the newly redeveloped Custom House Quay area in 1998. A plaque attached to the arch indicates that the arch was re-dedicated to Pat O'Shea for his community work and is dated April 2002. It is said to have originally been constructed to celebrate Wellington's victory at the Battle of Salamanca and acted for many years as the principal entrance gate to Custom House Quay.
	Free Flow	Customs House Quay to the Point Theatre along Dublin Dock 53.348170°N 6.251252°W		Rachel Joynt	900 small glass cobbles set into light fittings along 1 km of the docks, with small metal silver and copper fish set inside them.
	Justice	Four Courts Dublin	1796	Edward Smyth	
	Mercy	Four Courts Dublin	1796	Edward Smyth	
	Authority	Four Courts Dublin	1796	Edward Smyth	
	Moses	Four Courts Dublin	1796	Edward Smyth	
	Wisdom	Four Courts Dublin	1796	Edward Smyth	
More images	14 Sculptures of river gods at the Custom House, Dublin	Custom House Quay		Edward Smyth	A number of these river gods featured on the Irish Series A banknotes.
	Allegorical sculpture of Commerce, Custom House, Dublin	Custom House Quay		Edward Smyth	
	Allegorical sculpture of Plenty with cornucopia, Custom House, Dublin	Custom House Quay		Edward Smyth	
	Sculpture of Mercury, Custom House, Dublin	Custom House Quay		Edward Smyth	
	Allegorical sculpture of Industry (with beehives), Custom House, Dublin	Custom House Quay		Edward Smyth	
	Allegorical sculpture of Neptune, Custom House, Dublin	Custom House Quay		Edward Smyth	
	The then Irish Coat of Arms, Custom House, Dublin	Custom House Quay		Edward Smyth	
	Hibernia and Britania embrace while Neptune casts away Famine	Custom House Quay		Edward Smyth	

=== City North East ===
This area of the city is bounded to the west by O'Connell Street, Parnell Square East, North Frederick Street, and Lower Dorset Street. To the north it is bounded by the Royal Canal, and to the south by the Liffey Quays. To the east it includes the North Wall.

Image	Title / subject	Location and coordinates	Date	Artist / designer	Notes
More images	James Joyce	North Earl Street	1990	Marjorie FitzGibbon	Nicknamed "The Prick with the Stick"
	Margaret Ball and Francis Taylor	Cathedral Street	2001	Conall McCabe	
	The Three Graces	Cathal Brugha Street	1941	Gabriel Hayes	
More images	The Wishing Hand	Marlborough Street	2001	Linda Brunker	
	Talking Heads	Abbey Street	1990	Carolyn Mulholland	
More images	Chariot of Life	Irish Life Centre, Lower Abbey Street	1982	Oisín Kelly	"Bronze male nude figure on stylized chariot with two galloping horses surrounded by geysers and set in rectangular basin"
More images	James Connolly	Beresford Place	1996	Éamonn O'Doherty	
More images	Universal Links on Human Rights Jails holding prisoners of conscience	Amiens Street	1995	Tony O'Malley	
	Battle of the Custom House Memorial	Memorial Road	1957	Yann Goulet	
	Scáthán	Store Street	2007	Robert McColgan	
More images	Luke Kelly	Sheriff Street	2019	Vera Klute	Installed in the community where Kelly was born.
	NC Iris	Mayor Square, Dublin Docklands	2006	Vivienne Roche	Commissioned by the National College of Ireland on their move to the IFCS. Built by Steel & Co.
	Strong Striking Bear of Great Deeds	IFSC House	1999	Don Cronin	Part of a pair 'Bear and Bull'. Bull sculpture is in lobby on other side of building.
	Bull	IFSC House	1999	Don Cronin	Part of a pair 'Bear and Bull'. Bear sculpture outside the other side of building.
More images	Dublin and Monaghan bombings Memorial	Talbot Street	1997	Oisín Kelly	
	Dublin and Monaghan bombings Memorial	Parnell Street	2008	unknown	
	Easter Rising Memorial	Parnell Square		unknown	
	1972 and 1973 Dublin bombings Memorial	Sackville Place	2004	Thomas Duffy	
	Summerhill Group	Summerhill	1991	Cathy Carman	Bronze work on Kilkenny limestone. It was commissioned by Dublin Corporation as part of the Per Cent for Art Scheme. The work invokes the history of the street, before its redevelopment when children would play on the street.
	Beds	Portland Row	1993	Fred Conlon	
	Home	Buckingham Street	2000	Leo Higgins	Commemorates lives lost in the area due to the heroin epidemic.
More images	The Five Lamps General Henry Hall Memorial	Amiens Street/North Strand	c. 1880	George Smyth	
	North Strand Bombing Memorial	North Strand Road	1991	unknown	
	Hexagon (This could be it)	North Strand Bombing Memorial Garden	2014	Steven Doody	Formerly in the National Botanic Gardens. Made from weathered steel (COR-TEN)
	Sundial	Mountjoy Square	1988	unknown	Polar Sundial and Tempus - is inscribed on it.
	Mosaic tile and concrete tree	Mountjoy Square		unknown	There are two of these in the centre of the square and both were created by the nearby Pavee Point centre
	Drop	Maritime Sculpture Garden, Dublin Port	2017	Eimear Murphy	
	The Mariner	Maritime Sculpture Garden, Dublin Port	1975	John Behan	Made of scrap metal
	2 × stone plaques commemorating the opening of Spencer Dock	Royal Canal lifting bridge	15 April 1873	unknown	Made from carved limestone
	Metal Plaque and cross on ground commemorating Matt Talbot	Matt Talbot Court, Seán O'Casey Avenue 53.356750°N 6.255111°W	August 1971	unknown	Inscription reads "These flats have been named Matt Talbot Court to commemorate the servant of God Matt Talbot who for the last 25 years of his life lived in a single room in 18 Upper Rutland Street. This house with many others was demolished to make room for these flats. Its site is marked to the left of this plaque."
	Marian shrine	Liberty Park, Foley Street 53.352068°N 6.252311°W	1954?	unknown	

=== City North West ===
This area of the city is bounded to the east by O'Connell Street, Parnell Square East, North Frederick Street, and Lower Dorset Street. To the north and west it is bounded by the North Circular Road and to the south by the Liffey Quays.

Image	Title / subject	Location and coordinates	Date	Artist / designer	Notes
More images	Easter Rising Memorial	Arbour Hill Cemetery			
	The Healing Hands	Mater Plot/Berkeley Road	2000	Tony O'Malley	
	Noyeks fire memorial	Parnell Street at junction with Kings Inn Street			
	Tom Clarke commemorative plaque	Parnell Street at junction with O'Connell Street			
	Four Masters Memorial	Four Masters Park (former Mater Plot)	1876	James Cahill	
	The Green Light (Solas na Glasraí)	Father Matthew Square off Church Street	1990 (relocated to Church Street in 2005)	Rachel Joynt	A bronze "market lamp" which was originally on Moore Street, and depicts fish, fruit, weights and fruit packaging. Executed in an Art Nouveau style.
More images	Children of Lir	Garden of Remembrance, Parnell Square	1966	Oisín Kelly	
	Irish Volunteers memorial	Parnell Square East	1960	Werner Schurmann	
	Easter Rising memorial	Rotunda Hospital gardens			
	Suzanne Walking in Leather Skirt	Parnell Square north	2006	Julian Opie	Two-sided animated LED display outside the Hugh Lane Gallery
More images	Let's Dance Memorial to the Miami Showband killings	Parnell Square north	2007	Redmond Herrity	
	Proclamation of the Republic Memorial	21 Henry Street	1991		Home of John Wyse Power and Jennie Wyse Power where the Proclamation of the Irish Republic was signed in April 1916.
More images	Brendan Behan	Royal Canal, Dorset Street	2003	John Coll	
	Peadar Kearney	Lower Dorset Street			
	The Soldier War of Independence Memorial	Blessington Street Park	1939	Leo Broe	
More images	Natural Histories	Blessington Street Basin 53.35754°N 6.270686°W	1994	Austin McQuinn	
More images	Éire 1798 Memorial	St. Michan's Park	1903	Unknown	
	Our Lady, Queen of Peace	Broadstone	unknown - Marian year 1954?		
	The O'Rahilly	O'Rahilly Parade	2005	Shane Cullen	
	Demolition Dave	Smithfield Luas stop	2004	James Gannon	Commissioned by the Railway Procurement Agency to celebrate the life of demolition manager Dave Conway
	Utah teapot	Smithfield, Dublin	2021	Alan Butler	
	Jerome Connor	Infirmary Road, Dublin 7		Unknown	Bronze plaque overlooking phoenix park
	Spiderweb Sculpture	Corner of Western Way and Mountjoy Street	2003	Kathleen O'Brien	An iron representation of a spiders webs affixed across the side of 53 Mountjoy Street. Commissioned by Dr Austin O'Carroll, whose GP practice used to be located inside the building.
	Hungry Tree	King's Inns Park	20th Century	King's Inns Park staff	A London plane which has been allowed to partially consume an adjacent park bench over the decades.
More images	Dublin's Last Supper	The Italian Quarter (Bloom Lane)	2004	John Byrne	Depicting a modern-day re-enactment of Leonardo da Vinci's 'The Last Supper', Byrne added an 'Irish twist' by replacing the Biblical characters with a cast of local Dubliners that reflected a "changing society and the growing cultural mix in Dublin".

== South city centre ==
=== Trinity College ===
Image	Title / subject	Location and coordinates	Date	Artist / designer	Notes
More images	Edmund Burke	Trinity College, west front (left) 53.344574°N 6.259191°W	1868	John Henry Foley	
More images	Oliver Goldsmith	Trinity College, west front (right) 53.344381°N 6.259210°W	1864	John Henry Foley	
More images	William Lecky	Trinity College	1904	Goscombe John	
More images	George Salmon	Trinity College	1911	John Hughes	
	Campanile	Trinity College	1853	Charles Lanyon, Thomas Kirk	
More images	Sphere Within Sphere	Trinity College 53.343812°N 6.255903°W	1982	Arnaldo Pomodoro	
More images	Reclining Connected Forms	Trinity College	1969	Henry Moore	
More images	Cactus Provisoire	Trinity College	1976	Alexander Calder	
	The Double Helix	Trinity College	2003	Brian King	
	Chac Mool	Trinity College	2015	Sebastián	
More images	Apples and Atoms Ernest Walton	Trinity College 53.343575°N 6.252427°W	2013	Eilis O'Connell	
	Countermovement	Trinity College	1985	Michael Warren	

=== St. Stephen's Green ===
Image	Title / subject	Location and coordinates	Date	Artist / designer	Notes
More images	Fusiliers' Arch Royal Dublin Fusiliers	St Stephen's Green	1907	John Howard Pentland	
More images	Jeremiah O'Donovan Rossa	St Stephen's Green			
More images	James Joyce	St Stephen's Green	1982	Marjorie FitzGibbon	
More images	Lord Ardilaun	St Stephen's Green	1891	Thomas Farrell	
More images	Fianna Éireann memorial	St Stephen's Green	1966		
More images	Robert Emmet	St Stephen's Green	1916 (original)	Jerome Connor	See Robert Emmet (Connor)
More images	Tom Kettle	St Stephen's Green	1919 (bust); 1927 (memorial)	Albert G. Power	
More images	Constance Markievicz	St Stephen's Green			
More images	Three Fates	St Stephen's Green	1956	Joseph Wackerle	
More images	Lady Laura Grattan Font	St Stephen's Green North	1880		
More images	James Clarence Mangan	St Stephen's Green	1909	Oliver Sheppard	
More images	Standing Figure: Knife Edge W. B. Yeats memorial	St Stephen's Green	1961	Henry Moore	
More images	Rabindranath Tagore	St Stephen's Green	2011		
More images	Rose Bowl	St Stephen's Green	2006	Sandra Bell	
More images	Wolfe Tone	St Stephen's Green	1967	Edward Delaney	
More images	Great Famine Monument	St Stephen's Green	1967	Edward Delaney	
More images	Anna and Thomas Haslam Memorial	St Stephen's Green	1923		
	Louie Bennett and Helen Chenevix Memorial	St Stephen's Green	1958		The memorial is located at a garden for the blind, where the names of scented plants are labelled in braille
More images	Eqyptian and Nubian noblewomen	Shelbourne Hotel, St Stephen's Green	1867	Mathurin Moreau	4 statues outside the Shelbourne Hotel

=== Merrion Square Park ===
Image	Title / subject	Location and coordinates	Date	Artist / designer	Notes
More images	Oscar Wilde Memorial Sculpture	Merrion Square Park 53.340806°N 6.250545°W	1997	Danny Osborne	
More images	Constance Lloyd Companion piece to the Oscar Wilde Memorial	Merrion Square Park 53.340857°N 6.250486°W	1997	Danny Osborne	
	Dionysus Companion piece to the Oscar Wilde Memorial	Merrion Square Park 53.340853°N 6.250590°W	1997	Danny Osborne	
More images	Michael Collins	Merrion Square Park	1990	Dick Joynt	
More images	Joker's Chair Dermot Morgan	Merrion Square Park 53.339917°N 6.248921°W	2002	Catherine Greene	
More images	Éire sculpture	Merrion Square Park	1974	Jerome Connor	
More images	Bernardo O'Higgins	Merrion Square Park	1995	Francisco Orellano Pavez	
	Henry Grattan	Merrion Square Park	1982	Peter Grant	
More images	The Victims	Merrion Square Park	1976	Andrew O'Connor	
More images	An Dún Cuimhneachán	Merrion Square Park	2008	Brian King	National Memorial to Members of the Defence Forces who died in the service of the state
	Mother and Child	Merrion Square Park	1985	Patrick Roe	
More images	Tribute Head II	Merrion Square Park	1983	Elisabeth Frink	
More images	George William Russell (Æ)	Merrion Square Park	1985	Jerome Connor	
More images	Rutland Fountain, Merrion Square	Merrion Square Park	1792	Francis Sandys	

=== Iveagh Gardens ===
Image	Title / subject	Location and coordinates	Date	Artist / designer	Notes
	John McCormack	Iveagh Gardens	2008	Elizabeth O'Kane	
	Neptune × 2	Iveagh Gardens	1865	Unknown	Two statues of Neptune Roman god of fresh water which are broken. The remains lie covered by undergrowth
	Unknown	Iveagh Gardens	1865	Unknown	Headless classical statue - likely Roman goddess on a granite plinth. Other similar statues are dotted around the park and are also in poor condition
	Venus	Iveagh Gardens	1865	Unknown	Nose has been broken off at some stage.
More images	Fountain × 2	Iveagh Gardens	1865	Ninian Niven	
	Sundial	Iveagh Gardens	Unknown		Sundial at the centre of an ornamental hedgerow maze
More images	Memorial to Human Rights Defenders	Iveagh Gardens	2020	Grafton Architects	

=== South Quays ===
Image	Title / subject	Location and coordinates	Date	Artist / designer	Notes
	Matt Talbot	City Quay	1989	James Power	Unveiled by Lord Mayor of Dublin Ben Briscoe, and funded with the help of the Matt Talbot Retreat Groups in the United States.
More images	Irish Merchant Navy Memorial	Elizabeth O'Farrell Park on City Quay	1990		
More images	Admiral William Brown	Sir John Rogerson's Quay 53.346040°N 6.239526°W	2006		
	Gaswork	Sir John Rogerson's Quay 53.34591°N 6.235546°W	2012	John Kindness	Commissioned by Bord Gáis to commemorate the history of gas in Dublin
More images	The Linesman	City Quay 53.347082°N 6.249143°W	1999	Dony MacManus	
More images	Patrick Sheahan Memorial	Hawkins Street	1906	W.P. O'Neill	
	People's Island (Oileán Na Ndaoine)	Traffic island at junction of D'Olier Street and Westmoreland Street	1988	Rachel Joynt	400 concrete paving slabs inlaid with bronze and aluminium footprints and bird and paw impressions. Temporarily relocated during the Luas Cross City project, but reinstated in summer 2017.
More images	Sunlight Chambers	Essex Quay 53.345289°N 6.267759°W	1902	Edward Ould	
More images	Wood Quay	Wood Quay	2002	Michael Warren	
	Báite (Viking ship)	Essex Quay	1988	Betty Newman-Maguire	
More images	Woodkey Walk	Wood Quay	1992	Rachel Joynt	18 slabs of black granite, bronze and stainless steel depicting Viking-era artefacts, creating a trail around the perimeter of Christchurch and Dublin Corporation Civic Offices.
More images	Ag Crú na Gréine	Wood Quay Park	2003	Jackie McKenna	"Enjoying the sun"

=== City South East ===
This area of the city is bounded to the west by Westmoreland Street, Trinity College, Grafton Street, St. Stephens Green West, and Harcourt Street. To the north it is bounded by the Liffey Quays, and to the south by the Grand Canal. To the east it includes Irishtown and Ringsend. Locations within this area with their own article subsections such as St. Stephen's Green are excluded.

Image	Title / subject	Location and coordinates	Date	Artist / designer	Notes
More images	Thomas Moore	College Street	1857	Christopher Moore	
	Long Stone replica	College Street	1986	Cliodhna Cussen	The Steine of Long Stone (Ivar the Boneless' Pillar). The original Long Stone it replaced was located near this spot from around the 10th or 11th century and stood 12–14 ft (3.7–4.3 m) high. It was removed in the early 18th century and its whereabouts are now unknown.
	Seán Mac Diarmada Memorial	12 D'Olier Street			
More images	Constance Markievicz	Townsend Street	1998	Elizabeth McLaughlin	Also show her cocker spaniel dog called Poppet.
	Harmony	Pearse Square, Pearse Street	1998	Sandra Bell	
	Units of Potential	Pearse Street	2011	Alice Rekab	
	Patrick and Willie Pearse	27 Pearse Street	1952	Desmond Broe	
More images	Táin Mosaic	Nassau Street	1974	Desmond Kinney	
More images	William Plunket	Kildare Street	1901	Hamo Thornycroft	
More images	Thomas Heazle Parke	Natural History Museum, Merrion Street			
	William Dargan	National Gallery, Merrion Street	1853		
	The Kiss	Earlsfort Terrace	1989	Rowan Gillespie	
	Lean	Earlsfort Terrace	2017	Caoimhe Kilfeather	Commissioned by the law firm Arthur Cox
	An SpéirBhean	Windsor Place, Pembroke Street	1990	Robin Buick	Also called Sky Woman or Heavenly Woman
More images	Reflections	Miesian Plaza, Baggot Street Lower	1978	Michael Bulfin	
More images	Red Cardinal	Miesian Plaza, Baggot Street Lower	1978	John Burke	
	Catherine McAuley	Baggot Street Lower	1994	Michael Burke	
	Somewhere between Andromeda and Vulpecula: Sky Atlas	Percy Place, off Haddington Road 53.334452°N 6.244131°W	2014	Isabel Nolan	
	Birdy	Upper Mount Street	1997	Rowan Gillespie	
	Memories of Mount Street	Upper Mount Street	1988	Derek A. Fitzsimons	
	Brian Friel and John B. Keane	Upper Mount Street 53.336593°N 6.243247°W	1994	Neil C. Breen	Previously the statues were inside the window of a nearby building. Moved outside c. 2017
	Easter Rising	Mount Street Bridge			
	Michael Malone Memorial	Northumberland Road			
	Love is the natural in between	John Scottus School, Northumberland Road			
	Carnac	Upper Leeson Street	1979	Bob Mulcahy	Granite abstract sculpture located on the traffic island.
More images	Patrick Kavanagh	Grand Canal	1991	John Coll	
	Overflow	Grand Canal Street	1997	Linda Brunker	
	Grand Canal Square	Grand Canal Dock	2008	Martha Schwartz	
	Dodder Buoy	Grand Canal Dock			
More images	More Equal	Grand Canal Plaza	1999	Eilis O'Connell	
	Queen Maedbh	Burlington Road	2004	Patrick O'Reilly	
	Barge Horse	Herbert Place	1999	Maurice Harron	
	An Gallán Gréine	Sean Moore Park, Irishtown	1983	Clíodna Cussen	"Sun Stone"
	Irish Mercantile Marine World War II memorial	Irishtown 53.337867°N 6.219618°W	1984		
	William Ashford	Irishtown 53.339345°N 6.223015°W	1893		
	James Joyce	Grounds of the Merrion Hotel		Rowan Gillespie	2 m high bronze statue titled Ripples of Ulysses
	Bláthú	South Bank House, Barrow Street		Sean Atmos	
	Stone etched map of Dublin	Boland's Mills 53.3421° N, 6.2372° W		unknown	

=== Leinster House ===
Image	Title / subject	Location and coordinates	Date	Artist / designer	Notes
More images	Prince Albert	Leinster Lawn, Leinster House	1868	John Henry Foley	Companion piece to statue of Queen Victoria which stood outside Leinster House on Kildare Street side. See Past Public Art section below.
	Industry and Fame (originally part of the Statue of Queen Victoria)	Leinster House	1908	John Hughes	Originally part of the Queen Victoria statue which stood outside Leinster House on Kildare Street side. See Past Public Art section below. Returned to Leinster House in 2001.
	Constance Markievicz	Leinster House	1930s	Leo Broe	
More images	Leinster Lawn Cenotaph: Arthur Griffith; Michael Collins; Kevin O'Higgins	Leinster Lawn, Leinster House	1923	Raymond McGrath	A temporary structure was erected in 1923 on Leinster Lawn, this was replaced by this more modern version in 1950. Four wreathed bronze plaques are inset in its base, three bear a low-relief profile of Griffith, Collins and O'Higgins. The fourth contains an inscription in Irish: "Do chum glóire Dé agus onóra na hÉireann". (Note: For the glory of God and the honour of Ireland)
	Robert Prescott Stewart	Leinster Lawn, Leinster House		Thomas Farrell	The base of the statue of Robert Prescott Stewart with the Dáil bike shed in the background

=== City South West ===
This area of the city is bounded to the east by Westmoreland Street, Trinity College, Grafton Street, St. Stephens Green West, and Harcourt Street. To the north it is bounded by the Liffey Quays, and to the south by the Grand Canal. To the west it is bounded by the South Circular Road.

Image	Title / subject	Location and coordinates	Date	Artist / designer	Notes
More images	Henry Grattan	College Green	1876	John Henry Foley	
	Thomas Davis	College Green	1966	Edward Delaney	
More images	Four Angels Fountain Secondary piece to Davis Memorial	College Green	1966	Edward Delaney	
More images	Crann an Óir	Central Plaza, Dame Street 53.344431°N 6.262783°W	1991	Éamonn O'Doherty	
More images	Bronze Palm Tree seat	Temple Bar 53.345608°N 6.262580°W		Vincent Browne	
	Iris	Photo Museum Ireland Meeting House Square, Temple Bar			
	Love Lane tiles	Crampton Court 53.344666°N 6.266604°W	2014	Anna Doran	A selection of ceramic tiles with quotes about love and heartbreak, lyrics, poetry and Irish wit submitted by the public to the artist via social media.
	Oliver St. John Gogarty and James Joyce	Temple Bar			
	Sir William Temple Plaque	Temple Bar/Temple Lane			
	The Dublin D	Grafton Street	2026		
More images	Molly Malone	Suffolk Street, 53.343753°N 6.260939°W	1988	Jeanne Rynhart	Previously on Grafton Street from 1988 to 2014
More images	Luke Kelly	South King Street	2019	John Coll	
	Dublin Yeomanry Memorial	St. Andrew Street			
	St Andrew	St. Andrew Street	1803		
More images	Phil Lynott	Harry Street	2005	Paul Daly	"The Ace with the Bass"
	Why go Bald	Dame Lane, off South Great Georges Street 53.343972°N 6.264270°W	1962		An advertising sign for the Universal Hair and Scalp Clinic. It was restored in 1999.
More images	Veronica Guerin	Dubhlinn Gardens, Dublin Castle	2001	John Coll	
More images	Garda Memorial Garden	Dubhlinn Gardens, Dublin Castle	2010	Anna Dolan	
More images	Serpent Water Feature	Dubhlinn Gardens, Dublin Castle	1994	Killian Shurmann	
More images	Special Olympics	Dubhlinn Gardens, Dublin Castle	2003	John Behan	
More images	Gate of Fortitude	Dublin Castle	1750	John van Nost the younger	
More images	Homeless Jesus	Christ Church Cathedral	2015	Timothy Schmalz	Donated to Dublin by "an anonymous North-American Episcopalian benefactor."
More images	Millennium Child	Christchurch Place 53.342802°N 6.271502°W	2000	John Behan	
	Tree of Life	Peace Park, Christ Church Cathedral	1988	Leo Higgins, Colm Brennan	
	Liberty Bell	St. Patrick's Park, St Patrick's Cathedral 53.340023°N 6.270563°W	1988	Vivienne Roche	A steel and bronze hanging bell
More images	The Literary Parade: Samuel Beckett; Austin Clarke; Brendan Behan; James Joyce; Seán O'Casey; John Millington Synge; W. B. Yeats; George Bernard Shaw; Oscar Wilde; James Clarence Mangan; Eilís Dillon; Jonathan Swift	St. Patrick's Park, St Patrick's Cathedral	1988	Colm Brennan, John Coll	
More images	Benjamin Guinness	St Patrick's Cathedral	1875	John Henry Foley	
More images	Sentinel	Patrick Street 53.339854°N 6.272160°W	1994	Vivienne Roche	
	1916 Children's Remembrance Play Garden	St. Audoen's Church, Park	2019		Memorial to the children who died in the Easter Rising, Inscription in Irish: Gairdín Súgartha i gCuimhne ar na Páistí a Cailleadh in 1916 (Playground in memory of the children who died in 1916)
More images	John Field	Golden Lane 53.34053°N 6.269918°W			
	Gulliver's Travels	53–58 Golden Lane 53.34071°N 6.26954°W	1996	Michael C Keane	Eight terracotta plaques, or roundals, affixed to the second floor of a red brick building depicting scenes from Jonathan Swift's Gulliver's Travels, specifically the first part of the book, entitled 'A Voyage to Lilliput'. Swift was Dean of nearby St Patrick's Cathedral. The works were commissioned by Dublin Corporation, and awarded to Terry Cartin of Cartin Ceramics, whom Michael C Keane and Mo Maloney worked with "on many projects".
More images	The Obelisk Fountain	James's Street 53.343295°N 6.290281°W	1790	Francis Sandys	
	Sacred Heart of Jesus	The Liberties	1929		Originally a Victorian drinking fountain, it was re-purposed in 1929, to mark the centenary of Catholic emancipation.
	Robert Emmet Memorial	Saint Catherine's Church, Thomas Street	1978		Erected by Dublin Corporation and the American Irish Foundation
	Adult and Child Seat	St. Catherine's Park, Thomas Street 53.342305°N 6.281440°W	1988	Jim Flavin	A bronze curvilinear seat, commissioned as part of the Dublin Millennium Sculpture Symposium 1988.
	Mirror Granite	In the small unnamed triangular park between Kevin Street Lower and Kevin Street Cross 53.337747°N 6.268897°W	1984	Kevin Buckley	
More images	Irish Writers: Brendan Behan; Con Houlihan; Patrick Kavanagh; Flann O'Brien	The pavement in front of The Palace Bar on Fleet Street 53.34584°N 6.25960°W	2011	Jarlath Daly	Four bronze plaques dedicated to Irish writers (Flann O'Brien, Con Houlihan, Brendan Behan and Patrick Kavanagh) set into the pavement in front of The Palace Bar
	Rory Gallagher	Rory Gallagher Corner, Temple Bar 53.34531°N 6.26543°W			A life-size bronze statue in the shape of Gallagher's Fender Stratocaster guitar
More images	Local businesses and trades in 1989	Temple Bar 53.34573°N 6.26285°W	1989	Rachel Joynt	Fifteen pieces of work embedded, or etched, into the pavement. "They include various designs sandblasted into the granite kerbstones on-site by the artist. Each design represents a business which was located nearby at the time; however some of these businesses are no longer here. The work includes a set of hoof prints leading to the Bad Ass Café; a fishing rod outside Rory's Fishing Tackle shop; a foot outside Leo Burdock's, which used to be a shoe shop; a bracelet outside No. 5, which used to be a bead shop; and an elephant outside No. 15, which used to be Rudyard's restaurant."
	The Green Machine	The Green Building, Crow Street, Temple Bar 53.34467°N 6.26381°W	1994	Remco de Fouw	One of the doors to the Green Building, an environmentally friendly urban building. de Fouw fashioned a "self-watering tree" into the door, made from recycled copper pipes and which sources its water from a recycled sink. "The work is placed on a copper background with machinery icons, creating the sense of a mechanical yet organically operating system."
	Absolute Jellies Make Singing Sounds	The Green Building, Temple Lane, Temple Bar 53.34468°N 6.26421°W	1994	Maud Cotter	One of the doors to the Green Building, an environmentally friendly urban building. Cotter described the work as "a vertical wall of beached objects or collectable pieces of crap layered behind glass, like pickles in a jar. An exercise in aesthetic recycling, finding a new meaning and use for the discarded, a place for the particular in a wave of change."
	Shutter	Outside the Irish Film Institute, Eustace Street 53.34465°N 6.26484°W	1994	Rachel Joynt	
	Viking Centre concrete mural	Rear of Smock Alley Theatre (originally part of the Viking Centre), Essex Street West 53.344738°N 6.268822°W	1997	Grace Weir	A concrete mural of constellations. Designed in collaboration with Gilroy McMahon Architects during the major urban revitalization of Temple Bar.
	1534 siege of Dublin Castle	Ship Street Little 53.34241°N 6.26867°W		Grace Weir	
	Rialto	Rialto 53.336249°N 6.298801°W	2000	Sandra Bell	

== Southside suburbs ==
Image	Title / subject	Location and coordinates	Date	Artist / designer	Notes
More images	Proclamation group Proclamation of the Irish Republic	Kilmainham Gaol	2007	Rowan Gillespie	
	Cross of Sacrifice	Irish National War Memorial Gardens, Islandbridge	1940	Edwin Lutyens	
	Stone of Remembrance	Irish National War Memorial Gardens, Islandbridge	1940	Edwin Lutyens	
	Sunken Rose Garden and granite Bookrooms	Irish National War Memorial Gardens, Islandbridge	1940	Edwin Lutyens	
	Domed Temple	Irish National War Memorial Gardens, Islandbridge	1940	Edwin Lutyens	
	Freedom	Facebook campus, Merrion Road		Alexandra Wejchert	
	Síol	Glencar House, Ballsbridge	2024	Rachel Joynt	4 m high sycamore seed, cast in bronze
	Stable Rocks	Entrance to apartments, Simmonscourt Road, Ballsbridge		Rachel Joynt	Bronze blocks incorporated into four granite pillars at entrance to an apartment complex, with "fossil-like" objects embedded into them pertaining to horse-riding (stirrups etc.)
	Keepsake (Cuimhneachán)	Lansdowne pl residential development, Ballsbridge		Rachel Joynt	Bronze arbutus berries from the strawberry tree patinated red/orange. Located in a residential development on site of the former Trinity College Dublin Botanic Gardens (1806–1966).
More images	An Cailín Bán	Sandymount Strand	2002	Sebastián	
More images	W. B. Yeats	Sandymount Green	1921	Albert Power	
	Seamus Heaney	Sandymount Green	2016	Carolyn Mulholland	
	Nothing Left	Sandymount			
	Wave	Park West	2001	Angela Conner	
	Dublin Brigade IRA Memorial	Harold's Cross	1954		
	Robert Emmet	Harold's Cross Road	2003		Erected by the Robert Emmet Association to commemorate his arrest at Palmer's House in 1803.
More images	Éamonn Ceannt	Éamonn Ceannt Park, Harold's Cross 53.322214°N 6.294121°W	1960s		
	Arthur Morrison Monument	Donnybrook	1838		Monument in the shape of a small obelisk.
More images	Who Made The World	Ballsbridge 53.328514°N 6.231763°W		Cliodna Cussen	
	Horse (stallion)	Ballsbridge	1984		In the grounds of the Bewleys/Clayton Hotel. Formerly the Masonic Female Orphan School of Ireland.
	Bird	Herbert Park, Ballsbridge	1990	Eoin Byrne	
More images	Richard Crosbie	Ranelagh Gardens	2008	Rory Breslin	
	A Rhinoceros	Classon's Bridge, Milltown 53.307935°N 6.254403°W	2002	unknown	
	unknown	Corner of Con Colbert Road and Chapelizod Bypass (R148 road) 53.342765°N 6.320170°W	unknown	unknown	A sculpture of a Knight on a horse
	Our Lady	Ballyfermot roundabout, in front of the Church of Our Lady of the Assumption 53.342328°N 6.348819°W	1954 (replaced 1978)		The parish of Ballyfermot was dedicated to Our Lady in 1953, and a temporary statue was installed on the roundabout until a permanent replacement in 1954. It was replaced again in August 1978.
	Easter Rising Memorial	Dean's Grange Cemetery			

=== University College Dublin ===
Image	Title / subject	Location and coordinates	Date	Artist / designer	Notes
	Noah's Egg	Veterinary building, UCD	2004	Rachel Joynt	
	Judgement	Sutherland School of Law, UCD	2013	Rowan Gillespie	Donated to UCD by Peter Sutherland. It is based on a small sculpture made by Rowan Gillespie in 1991 in response to a philosophical argument about the Iraq war.
	Iphigenia	Restaurant Building, UCD	1984	Tom Glendon	

== South County Dublin ==
Image	Title / subject	Location and coordinates	Date	Artist / designer	Notes
	Famine cross	Ballinascorney	c. 1850		
	Blackrock Dolmen	Blackrock	1987	Rowan Gillespie	
	Market Cross	Blackrock	8th or 9th Century	unknown	
	Lord Edward FitzGerald	Frescati Shopping Centre, Blackrock			FitzGerald live at Frescati House, near the site of the current shopping centre.
More images	Killiney Hill Obelisk	Killiney Hill	1742	John Mapas	
	Patrick Sarsfield	Lucan	c. 1790		
	The Marker Tree	Kingswood Interchange (N7 and R136), Citywest 53.302978°N 6.416075°W	2011	Andreas Kopp	"A distinctive gateway to South Dublin County. Based on the outlines of a tree the Marker Tree comprises an industrial style "trunk", embellished with brightly coloured steel "cushions" in place of branches and leaf clusters. The idea marks the merging of rural and urban boundaries which are key to the identity of the county."
	Anne Devlin	Rathfarnham	2003	Clodagh Emoe	Erected by the Anne Devlin Commemoration Association. Life-size bronze statue of Anne Devlin, Robert Emmet's loyal friend and supporter.
	Breaking Emmet's Block	Rathfarnham	2016	Alice Rekab	Inspired by the megalithic follies in Saint Enda's Park and Emmet's Block in the Pearse Museum.
	Love All	Templeogue 53.298334°N 6.303925°W	2007	Rachel Joynt	
More images	Stillorgan Obelisk	Stillorgan	1727	Edward Lovett Pearce	
	William Orpen	Stillorgan	2018	Rowan Gillespie	
	The Fiddler of Dooney	Stillorgan Shopping Centre		Imogen Stuart	
	St. Maelruan's Losset	Tallaght	Unknown but possibly ancient	Unknown	
More images	Three Bears With Attitude	Tallaght University Hospital	2009	Patrick O'Reilly	Originally at 3 Arena. Moved to Tallaght University Hospital.
	Cliabhan (cradle)	Tymon Park, Tallaght 53.295868°N 6.327205°W	2006	Linda Brunker	Large bronze leaves which take the form of an arm extending from the ground up into three hands, which support a golden bronze baby in a nest of leaves. Commissioned by Pact to commemorate their 50th anniversary and 50 years of adoption in Ireland.
	Node 81	Glenview Roundabout, Tallaght	2025	Liam O'Callaghan	
	The Victors	Main Street, Tallaght Village 53.287666°N 6.362055°W	1989	Dick Joynt	4 m high limestone totem pole consisting of four figures "standing back to back, with their hands raised aloft, holding up two children on a base featuring Celtic-style spirals"
	The Dancers	Katharine Tynan Memorial Plot, Greenhills Road, Tallaght Village 53.288292°N 6.358891°W	1988	Antoinette Fleming	Two bronze figures, linking arms in a dance swing, stand on a circular base.
	Tallaght X	Tallaght Cross East square, Tallaght 53.288200°N 6.374003°W	2008	Eileen MacDonagh	Four rectangular stainless-steel forms which lean against each other and bend near the top, forming an X shape.
	Interaction	In front of South Dublin County Council offices, Parthalán Place, Tallaght 53.288618°N 6.373043°W	c. 1994	Michael Bulfin	Two stainless-steel poles, approximately 6 m high, support overlapping 2 m steel rings set at different angles, forming an arrangement of intersecting curves.
	The Quality Phree	Outside Tallaght Social Services Centre, Belgard Square South, Tallaght 53.286839°N 6.368943°W		Vivienne Roche	Three large geometric forms made from patinated Corten steel arranged in a line, incorporating tetrahedral and triangular shapes.
	A Monument for Two Communities	Rathcoole Park, Rathcoole 53.283798°N 6.455659°W	2000	Maurice O'Connell	A mound in the form of a "mock burial chamber", in which a time capsule is interred, containing records of the two communities of Rathcoole and Saggart.
	Blip	Clondalkin Civic Centre, Ninth Lock Road, Clondalkin 53.323586°N 6.395056°W	2002	Corban Walker	Four stainless steel elements, one of which is installed in the River Camac, and three standing 6.5 m high on the paved plaza and illuminated with LED units.
	Cats and Dogs Do Yoga	St. Mary's Senior School, Collinstown Road, Dublin 22 53.343089°N 6.395670°W	2007	Michael Disley	A yellow sandstone depiction of two dogs and a cat doing handstands, and scaled to a child's size.
	Life Lines	Under a waterfall in Rathcoole Park, Rathcoole 53.282211°N 6.456523°W	1999	Patricia McKenna	A series of bronze overlapping hands, cast from people from Rathcoole and Saggart
	Moon Bench and Stools	Sacred Heart School, Killinarden, Tallaght 53.277158°N 6.381854°W	2006	Tom Dalton	The Moon Bench, made of beaten and layered stainless steel, and smaller mosaic stools nearby.
	One Metre of Personal Space	South Dublin County Council Offices, Parthalán Place, Tallaght 53.288713°N 6.373038°W	2005	Fiona Mulholland	3 mm laser-cut stainless steel, in a 1 m by 1 m square, set into the pavement outside the main door to the South Dublin County Council Offices
	Rowlagh Belltower	Church of the Immaculate Heart of Mary, Rowlagh, Ronanstown 53.344120°N 6.395203°W	2006	Cecilia Moore	Two colourful mosaic panels located either side of the bell tower at its base made up of blue, green and purple glass tiles and inset with bronze.
	Sugar and Spice	St Finian's Avenue, Esker South, Lucan 53.348458°N 6.441868°W	1999	Louise Walsh	Two bronze sculptures of children which act as traffic calming devices sited either side of a ramp in a housing estate.
	Unity	Cherrywood 53.242272°N 6.139242°W	2021	Sandra Bell	
	Sycamore tree-stump carvings: Fionn mac Cumhaill; Queen Medb; Brian Boru; Danu; Cú Chulainn	Brittas 53.236981°N 6.454554°W	2018	Richie Clarke	Five sycamore tree-stump carvings of Gaelic warriors. Commissioned in 2017 by 'Brittas and District Residents Association' and 'Brittas Tidy Towns Group', and funded under the Towns and Villages Renewal Scheme, administered by the Local Enterprise Office.
	The Wave	Junction 13, Sandyford Interchange, M50 53.270848°N 6.215493°W	2008	Mark Joyce	250 coloured aluminium columns that point upwards from flat granite
	Usher Monument	Opposite Dundrum Town Centre, Main Street, Dundrum 53.292094°N 6.245607°W	unknown	unknown	A granite obelisk which was erected to the memory of Dr. Isaac Usher, one of the early motor-vehicle fatalities in Ireland (1917)
	Pater and Ned	Sandyford Road, Sandyford Village 53.269929°N 6.224763°W	1996	Rowan Gillespie	Inspired by a sketch on the Gerry Ryan Show called 'Sil, Pater and Ned'
	Stonecutter memorial	Sandyford	2022	Seamus Boylan	
	Kilgobbin Cross	Stepaside 53.256478°N 6.217806°W	10th century		
	Conversation	Árd Lorcan Villas housing estate, Stillorgan 53.286595°N 6.196986°W	unknown	Julie Merriman/Nicos Nicolaou	A wall-mounted piece based on the structure of a crossword. The work was commissioned for the "residents of the three purpose-built homes for senior citizens at Ard Lorcan Villas."
	Cut Out People	Blackrock Park, Rock Road, Blackrock 53.304771°N 6.185492°W	unknown	Dan McCarthy	A pair of two-dimensional human profiles, intersected at right angles
	Face the Earth	Brookfield Grove, Sweetmans Avenue, off Carysfort Avenue, Blackrock 53.296909°N 6.176952°W	unknown	Nicos Nicolaou	A low-relief of straight lines and small circles based upon the "abstract patterns formed by the roads, paths and streets" of a new housing development
	Eclipse	Marlay Park 53.275860°N 6.265743°W	unknown	Eileen MacDonagh	A cylindrical sculpture, standing upright with a "thinner tube form emerging from its side on the same plane."
	Stele	Otranto Park, Sandycove	2022	Imogen Stuart	Designed by Imogen Stuart with collaboration from Ciaran Byrne, Aisling Stuart, and Tim O'Neill.

=== Dún Laoghaire ===
Image	Title / subject	Location and coordinates	Date	Artist / designer	Notes
More images	Queen Victoria Fountain	Dún Laoghaire			
More images	Capt. J. McNeil Boyd Obelisk	Dún Laoghaire Harbour		Royal St. George Yacht Club	
More images	George IV Testimonial	Dún Laoghaire	1823	Aird-engineer	Granite obelisk which commemorates King George IV and the renaming of Dunleary to Kingstown. It also records the laying of the first stone of Dún Laoghaire Harbour in 1817.
More images	Christ the King	Dún Laoghaire	1978	Andrew O'Connor	
More images	Archer II	Dún Laoghaire		Niall O'Neill	Originally sited in Marlay Park.
More images	Roger Casement	Dún Laoghaire	2021	Mark Richards	
	Commemorative Trees Stone	People's Park, Dún Laoghaire			
More images	Mothership	Glasthule	1999	Rachel Joynt	Cast bronze and stainless steel sea urchin seashell
	Thus Daedalus Flew	Killiney Hill	1986	Niall O'Neill	
	Sun Worshipper	Crosthwaite Park 53.286756°N 6.134243°W	unknown	Noel Scullion	A sculpture replicating a solid shadow of a seated woman which is aligned in a north-south direction with the noon summer solstice.
	Old Dalkey Head	Glenageary Road Upper, Glenageary 53.278468°N 6.131402°W	unknown	Tom Glendon	A sculpture reminiscent of a Moai from Easter Island

== Past public art ==
Image	Title / subject	Location and coordinates	Date	Artist / designer	Notes
	Equestrian statue of George I	Initially at Essex Bridge, later at the Mansion House	1722–1755, 1789–1922	John Nost	Initially erected on Essex Bridge (now Grattan Bridge) in 1722, and removed in 1753. It was later re-erected in the garden of the Mansion House in 1789, where it stood until 1922. In 1937, it was sold to the Barber Institute of Fine Arts in Birmingham, England, where it stands since 1937.
	George II	St Stephen's Green	1758–1937	John van Nost the younger	Blown up on 13 May 1937, the day after the coronation of George VI.
	Archibald Montgomerie	St Stephen's Green	1866–1958	Patrick MacDowell	Destroyed in August 1958 in an explosion by the IRA, two Gardaí and a civilian were injured in the bombing.
	William of Orange	College Green	1701–1929	Grinling Gibbons	Damaged after explosion on anniversary of Armistice Day in 1928, and subsequently removed in 1929. Melted down in 1946.
	Sir Philip Crampton	College Street	1862–1959 replacing the original Viking Long Stone	John Kirk	Collapsed in 1959 and subsequently removed. Nicknames included "The Pineapple" and "The Cauliflower". It was subsequently replaced by The Steine of Long Stone by Cliodhna Cussen in 1986.
	Griffith-Collins Cenotaph	Leinster House, Kildare Street	1923–1939	George Atkinson	Structure had become dilapidated and was removed in 1939. It was replaced in 1950 by current obelisk on Leinster Lawn (see above)
	Steine of Dublin	College Street, Dublin	9th century to early 1700s	Unknown	Norse era structure to mark the domain of Viking Dublin which was removed at some stage in the early 1700s.
	The Market Cross	The junction of High Street and Skinner's Row (now Christchurch Place) near the city tholsel	Early Medieval	Unknown	Its earliest confirmed identification is from a public punishment in 1571. The last remaining drawing of the cross is by John Simmons in 1776. It was then taken down sometime in the late 18th or early 19th century and its whereabouts are unknown.
	Statue of Queen Victoria	Leinster House, Kildare Street 53.340713°N 6.254616°W	1908–1948	John Hughes	Removed in 1948 as part of moves by the Irish State towards declaring a Republic, put on display in Sydney, Australia in 1987. The smaller bronze statues are held in storage within the grounds of the National museum overflow facility at St Conleth's Reformatory School.
	Nelson's Pillar	O'Connell Street 53.349817°N 6.260268°W	1809–1966	Francis Johnston; William Wilkins; Thomas Kirk	Blown up in 1966 on the 50th anniversary of the 1916 Rising. The head of Nelson's statue was rescued, and is currently on display in the Dublin City Library and Archive on Pearse Street
	William Blakeney	O'Connell Street	1759–1782	John van Nost the younger	Removed sometime before 1782
	Bowl of Light	O'Connell Bridge	1953–1963	Unknown	Erected to mark inauguration of An Tóstal festival. Flames of sculpture thrown into the Liffey in 1953. Remainder dismantled in 1963.
	Sir Alexander Macdonnell	Marlborough Street	1878–1958	Thomas Farrell	Originally located in front of Tyrone House within the grounds of the Department of Education. Now stored in the grounds of the National museum overflow facility at St Conleth's Reformatory School.
	Monument to Hugh Gough, 1st Viscount Gough	Phoenix Park	1878–1957	John Henry Foley	Blown up in 1957, it was later restored and re-erected in the grounds of Chillingham Castle, England, in 1990. (Note: Bought by a member of the Guinness family from the Office of Public Works. It was loaned to Humphrey Wakefield of Chillingham Castle. It is on loan until the people of Ireland want it returned.)
	William Shakespeare	Riversdale House, Kilmainham	1725–1969	Unknown	The house was built around 1725 in stone for Dublin lawyer John Fitzpatrick who sold it shortly after to a legal colleague Simon Bradstreet. The house had extensive formal gardens and a stone statue of Shakespeare on the front. It later became tenements in the late 19th and early 20th century. The whereabouts of the statue today are unknown. In the manner of a similar statue by Peter Scheemakers.
	George II	Weavers' Hall, The Coombe	1750–1937	John van Nost the younger	It was erected in a niche on the front of Weavers' Hall in the Coombe to mark the 50th anniversary of the Battle of the Boyne. It was taken down as it was feared that it may be blown up by Republicans and today the remains are held within the collections of the Dublin Civic Museum.
	Frederick the Great	Prussia Street	1760–?	Patrick Cunningham	Metal bust installed on the niche of a house on Cabragh Lane, which was then to be renamed Prussia Street in honour of Frederick the Great who was celebrating his 49th birthday. The bust was apparently executed by Patrick Cunningham a former apprentice of John van Nost the younger.
	George Howard	Phoenix Park	1870–1958	John Henry Foley	The statue was dislodged by a bomb 28 July 1958 and moved to Castle Howard in Yorkshire. The pedestal remains in place as a memorial.
	George IV	Linenhall, Dublin	1824	Thomas Kirk	In black marble with inscription - "This statue of his majesty George IV was erected by the merchants engaged in the linen trade of Ireland to commemorate his majestys gracious visit to the linen hall, on the 23rd of August 1821.
	George IV	RDS Main Hall, Ballsbridge	1846–?	William Behnes and Constantine Panormo	"In the Hall is a large Statue of George IV., by Behnes, and busts of many eminent men." (1890)
	Millennium Clock	River Liffey	Mar. to Aug. 1996		
	The Point Rocket	Point Theatre	2006–?		
	Aspiration – Liberty Scaling the Heights	Grand Canal Street	1995–2020	Rowan Gillespie	Removed in 2020
	Gateway	Marine Road, Dún Laoghaire 53.294358°N 6.133614°W	2002–2009	Michael Warren	Removed in 2009. Returned to the artist in 2015 in exchange for an alternative work entitled 'Angel Negro'.
	The Claddagh Embrace	Corner of Dame Street and South Great George's Street 53.344059°N 6.264302°W	10–29 April 2015 (approx.)	Joe Caslin	Installed during the night on Friday 10 April 2015 in the weeks prior to the 2015 Irish constitutional referendum on same-sex marriage on 22 May 2015. "After 19 days, the wind and the rain began to take it (the mural) down".
	Trace	Junction of Stephen's Green and Merrion Row 53.338553°N 6.255432°W	c. 1988–2013	Grace Weir	A pair of arches made from limestone, Portland stone and bronze, commissioned in 1988 as part of Dublin's millennium celebrations. Permanently decommissioned according to Dublin City Council Public Art Manager Ruairí Ó Cuiv.
	A Walk Among Stone	In front of the Ballymun Flats, Ballymun	c. 1988–?	Michael Bulfin	Granite boulders and concrete chunks set into the earth on the crest of a small rise. The piece won the Concrete Society of Ireland Sculpture Award in 1990.It was subsequently irreparably damaged during removal during the regeneration of the Ballymun district.
	Parable Island	Pimlico, behind Thomas Street	c. 1988–?	Peter Fink	A large red, scaffolding-like structure incorporating geometric steel forms and angular projections. Local children used it as a climbing frame and it was removed.
	Chair	"bottom of George's Street, off Dame Street"	c. 1988–?	Carolyn Mulholland	A bronze chair set into the pavement.
	RGB Sconce, Hold Your Nose	City Hall 53.344020°N 6.267367°W	Sept. 2021 – Sept. 2022	Alan Phelan	5 m high candelabra (temporary artwork) which occupied the O'Connell Plinth.

== See also ==
- List of public art in Belfast
- List of public art in Cork city
- List of public art in Galway city
- List of public art in Limerick
