= Vivienne Roche =

Irish sculptor and art critic

- Born: 1953 (age 72–73); Cork, Ireland
- Education: Crawford School of Art
- Website: http://www.vivienneroche.com

Vivienne Roche (born 1953) is an Irish sculptor and art critic.

== Biography ==
Born in Cork in 1953, the daughter of an engineer, Roche was educated in Miss O'Sullivan's primary and secondary school before studying first at the Crawford School of Art from 1970 to 1974 and then the School of the Museum of Fine Arts in Boston graduating in 1975. She was awarded an honorary doctorate by University College Cork in 2006.

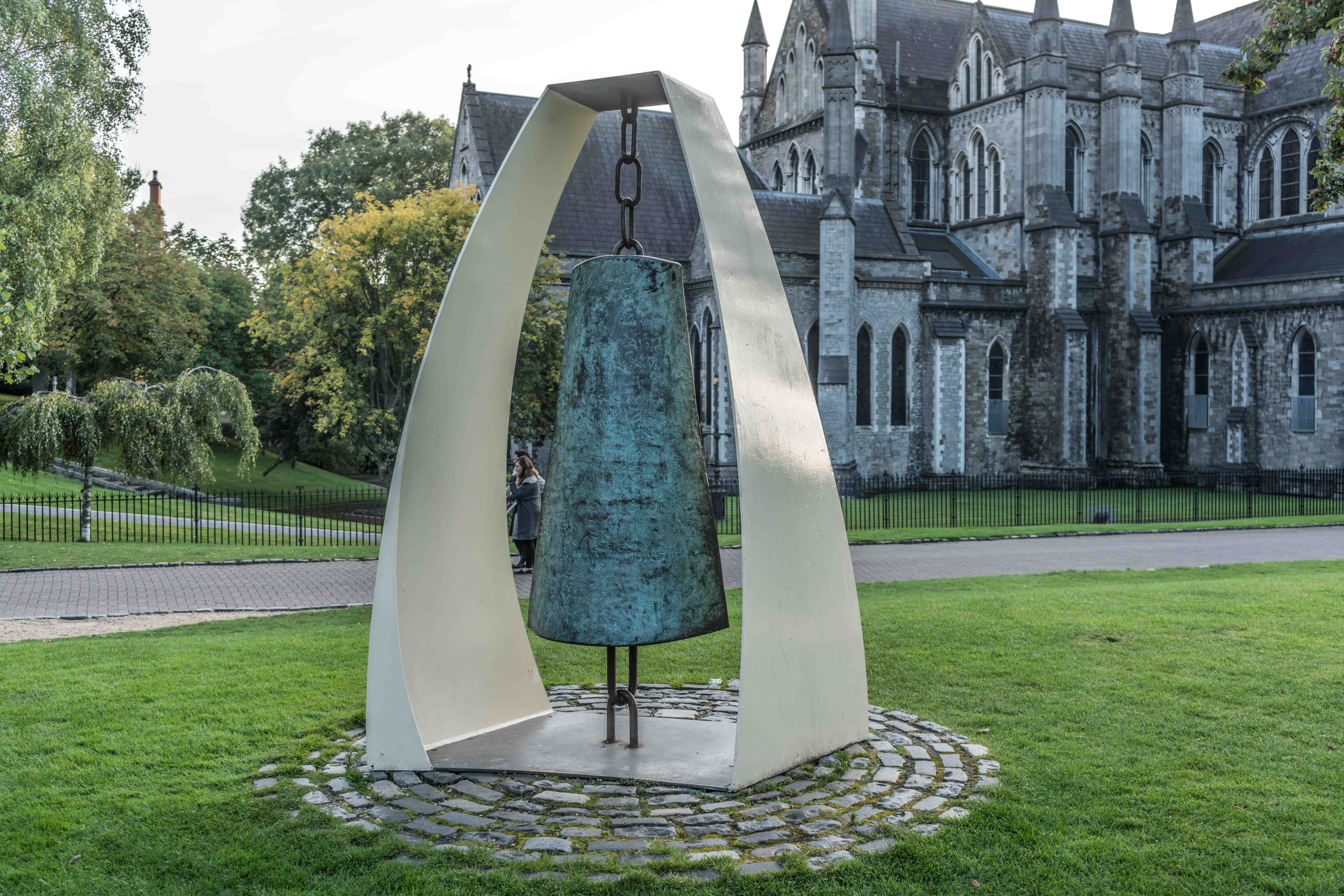
Roche's Liberty Bell (1998) in Dublin's St. Patrick's Park

She began her creative life as an artist but moved into sculptor and is considered one of Ireland's foremost sculptors. Roche was one of the founders of the National Sculpture Factory in Cork and was the chair from 1989 to 1997. She also was on the national Arts Council from 1993 to -1998 as well as on the governing body of Cork Institute of Technology. She is a member of Aosdána and the Royal Hibernian Academy. She is on the board of the Hugh Lane Gallery and the Dublin City Gallery. Roche remains active in creating national cultural policy.

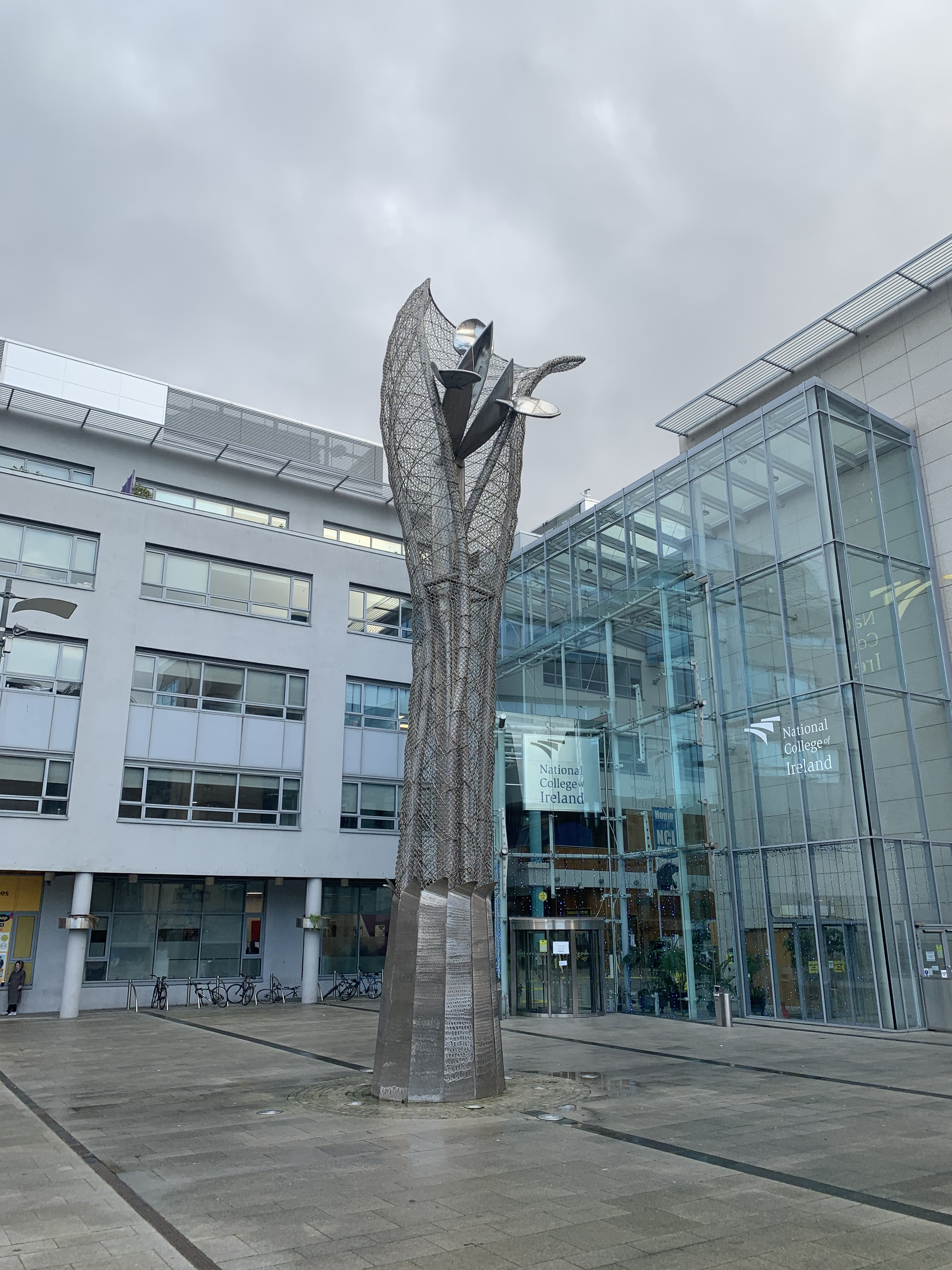
Roche's NC Iris (2006) outside National College of Ireland in Mayor Square, Dublin

Roche has participated in exhibitions in multiple countries like France, Finland, Sweden, England, and the U.S. Her work has been presented by the President of Ireland to other national heads of state. She lives in County Cork.
