= Cliodhna Cussen =

Irish sculptor

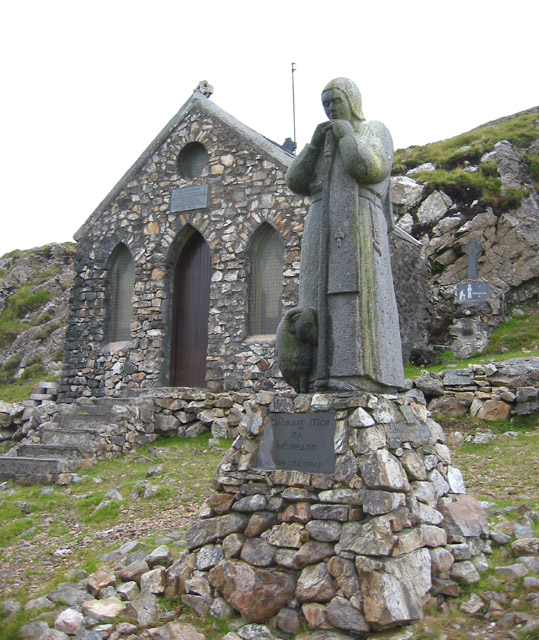
Cussen's statue of Saint Patrick, Máméan in Connemara.

Cliodhna Cussen (18 September 1932 – 2 August 2022) was an Irish sculptor, artist and author. She was born in Newcastle West, County Limerick in 1932 to a prominent local family and died on 2 August 2022. She was married to Pádraig Ó Snodaigh, a poet, writer and publisher. She was mother of Sinn Féin TD for Dublin South Central Aengus Ó Snodaigh.

== Early life and family ==
Cliodhna Cussen was born on 18 September 1932 in Newcastle West, County Limerick. Her parents were Kathleen (nee McCartan) and Robert Cussen, a solicitor. She had 6 siblings. She attended Laurel Hill Convent secondary school, Limerick, and University College Dublin to study history to Masters level. She worked in UCD as a tutor for a period, she went on to qualify as a solicitor, but during her time in UCD she enrolled at the National College of Art specialising in wood carving. In 1955, she travelled to Florence on a scholarship to study.

== Career ==
One of her most prominent pieces of public art is at the intersection of Pearse and College Streets in Dublin. The Long Stone replica (Ivar the Boneless' Pillar) was erected in 1986 and marks the site of an original Viking long stone to prevent their longships from running aground. She also created the 'Who Made The World' sculpture in Ballsbridge.

She has received many public work commissions which can be found around Ireland. She is known for working mainly in stone and bronze. In 1986, she added a statue of Saint Patrick depicted as a shepherd with a sheep at his feet at the pilgrimage site of Máméan in Connemara.

She is the author of the novel, An Eochair (the key), a fictional account of the life of Eibhlín Dubh Ní Chonaill (especially her relationship with Art Ó Laoghaire), author of Caoineadh Airt Uí Laoghaire, one of the greatest laments in Irish literature. She has authored three collections of poetry published by Coiscéim, Sifíní (2001), Turasanna (2011) and Idir Dhá Sháile (2018).

== Books ==
- Trupall Trapall, Oifig an tSoláthair (1972)
- Síle Bhuí, Oifig an tSoláthair (1975)
- Buile Shuibhne, Conradh na Gaeilge (1976)
- Tomhais, Oifig an tSoláthair (1977)
- Éalú ón gCaisleán, Oifig an tSoláthair (1978)
- Mat agus Muta, Clódhanna Teoranta (1978)
- Gearóid Iarla, Clódhanna Teoranta (1978)
- An Droch Shaol, Clódhanna Teoranta (1980)
- Bainne na Bó (i dteannta Mairéad ní Chinnéide), An Gúm (1986)
- Inniu an Luan, Coiscéim (1987)
- Some Observations on Stone, Aisling Press, (1988)
- Torfinn, Coiscéim (1988)
- An Bhean úd Thall, Bord na Gaeilge (1990)
- Soraidh Slán, Coiscéim (1993)
- Teacht na nGael go hÉireann, Coiscéim (1995)
- An Eala Dubh, Coiscéim (1996)
- Sifíní, Coiscéim (2001)
- Cath Chluain Tarbh, Coiscéim (2003)
- Conal agus Údaí, Coiscéim (2005)
- Ar Dheisiúr na Gréine, Coiscéim (2006)
- Síoda ar Shíoda - Rogha Dánta ó 700-2000, Eag. le Mícheál Ó Ruairc, Coiscéim (2008)
- Turasanna, Coiscéim (2011)
- An Eochair, Coiscéim (2014)
- Tiompán Tráthnóna, Coiscéim (2017)
- Idir dhá Sháile, Coiscéim (2018)
- Bhíodar Aréir Ann, Coiscéim (2019)

== See also ==
- List of public art in Dublin
