= Church of Our Lady of the Assumption, Ballyfermot =

Church in Dublin, Ireland

Church of Our Lady of the Assumption
- Church of Our Lady of the Assumption, Ballyfermot
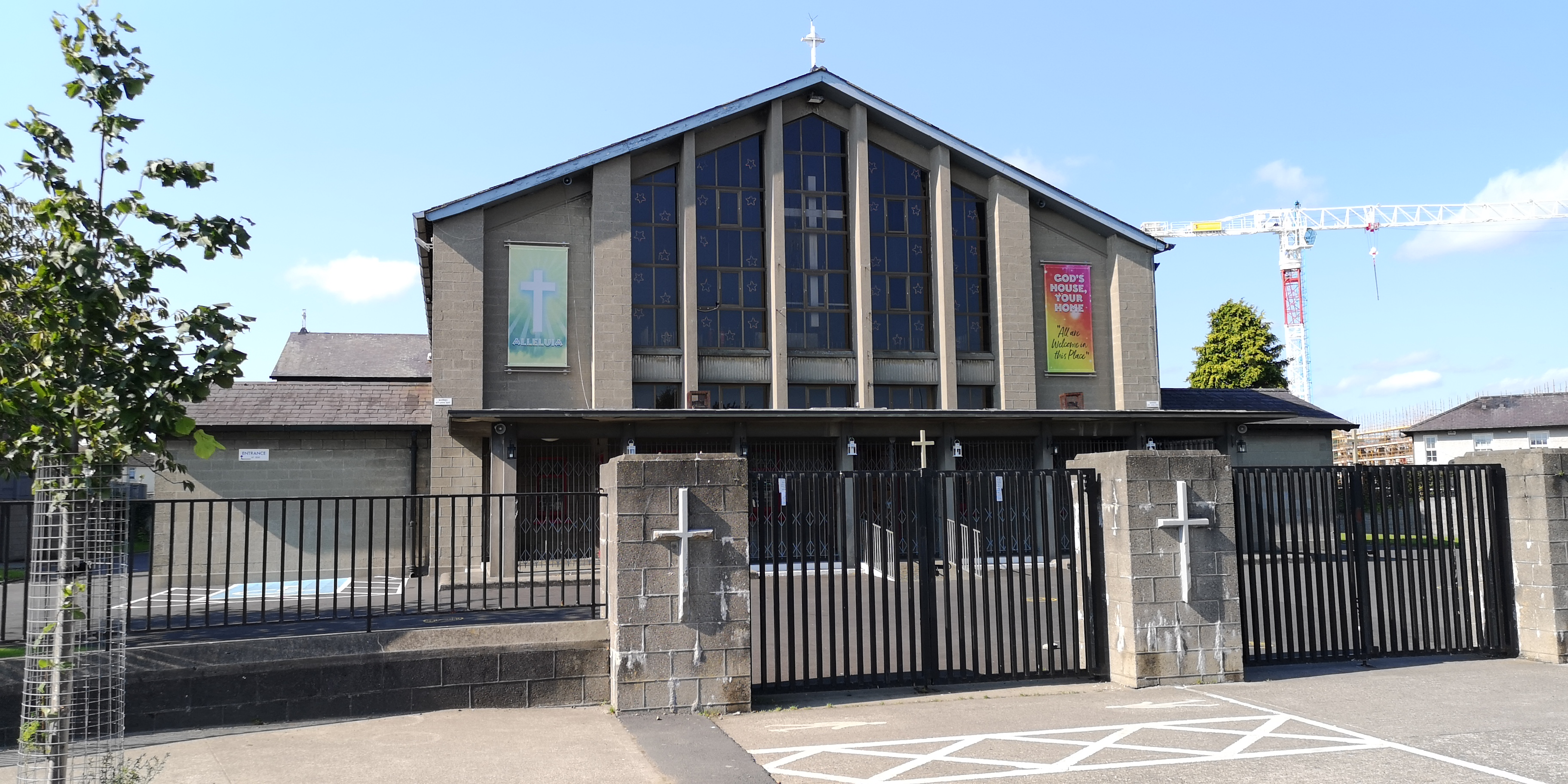
- Church of Our Lady of the Assumption
- 53.3428°N 6.3500°W
- Location: Ballyfermot; County Dublin; D10 NC84
- Country: Ireland
- Denomination: Roman Catholic
- Website: https://assumptionballyfermot.ie/

History
- Founded: 15 March 1953 (73 years ago)
- Dedication: Our Lady and the Feast of the Assumption

Administration
- Archdiocese: Dublin
- Deanery: Maynooth
- Parish: Ballyfermot Assumption

The Church of Our Lady of the Assumption is a Roman Catholic church in Ballyfermot, Dublin, Ireland. It is next to St. Raphael's National School.

== History ==
=== First church ===
The first church in modern-day Ballyfermot existed in a former Dublin Corporation paint depot on O'Hogan Road which Father Donal O'Scannaill had purchased from Dublin Corporation c. 1950 for £200. This building had originally been a storage unit known as 'the painters hut' during the first housing phase of Ballyfermot. It was used from 1950 until Our Lady of the Assumption Church opened in 1953. This shed was also used as a soup kitchen, nicknamed in the locality the 'Stew House', where the Daughters of Charity of Saint Vincent de Paul served soup to the needy of the area. 'Our Lady's of Victories Youth Club' began there also.

=== Fundraising for modern church ===
Éamonn MacThomáis, the Dublin historian and author, recalled in The Irish Press how Ballyfermot got its new church. Mac Thomáis' parish church was the nearby St. Michael's in Inchicore and one Sunday at mass Father Donal O'Scannaill (one of the curate’s in St Michael's and also assigned to help initialise the new parish of Ballyfermot) appealed over the altar for door-to-door collectors to help collect money to build a church in Ballyfermot. Mac Thomáis offered his services and within a week received his collector’s book to collect from what were then known as the 'newly wed houses' on Muskerry Road.

There were many other events organised by Father Donal O'Scannaill and the community to raise funds for the new church, such as social evenings which included dances and rounds of the game Take Your Pick!, named after a popular radio show of the time. This was a game where the person playing had the choice to take money that was offered to them or open a box which could result in winning nothing. The biggest fundraiser for the building of Our Lady of the Assumption Church was the ‘Buy a Block’ campaign whereby cement blocks were sold to the public at the cost of £1 each. 3,300 blocks were eventually sold in this way, raising much needed funds. People who could not afford to pay the £1 in one go were allowed to pay in instalments of 6d. a week until the block was paid off. Once a block had been paid for in full, the buyer received a souvenir receipt saying that they owned one cement block in the church.

=== Construction and opening ===
The church was designed by Robinson, Keefe and Devine and built by John Hughes & Son. Work started in May 1951. The church cost £68,000 to build. The mahogany seats cost £10,000. Seating capacity in 1952 was for 1,980 people. The first mass was celebrated in the new church on 15 March 1953.

Father Donal O'Scannaill later wrote in a 25th anniversary article about his joy in bringing the blessed sacrament in a "solemn procession from the painters hut to our lovely new church" and how the memory would abide with him forever.

=== Statue of Our Lady ===
In 1953, a temporary statue of Our Lady was installed in the middle of the roundabout in front of the church, until a permanent replacement was made and erected in 1954, funded by the Archdiocese. This was replaced again in August 1978 to celebrate 25 years of the church opening. In 2022, it was reported that plans were in place to move the statue as part of a redesign of the roundabout for a new bus corridor.

== See also ==
- List of public art in County Dublin
