= Joyce Trail =

Artwork in Dublin, Ireland

Map of central Dublin showing the locations of 13 of the plaques (No. 12 is missing)

The Joyce Trail is a 1988 artwork by artist Robin Buick consisting of 14 separate bronze plaques set into the streets of Dublin, Ireland at locations relevant to scenes from the novel Ulysses (1922) by James Joyce.

According to the book The Complete Guide to The Statues and Sculptures of Dublin City published in 2015:

In Chapter 8, 'Lestrygonians', Leopold Bloom makes his way from Middle Abbey Street on the north side of the city to Kildare Street on the south side. This journey is marked by fourteen bronze plaques inlaid on the pavement at the various stops that Bloom made in Chapter 8. Each plaque has a quote from the book relevant to the stop where the plaque is located.

According to a 1990s Dublin Tourism publication, the series of plaques, designed by Buick, "trace the route of Leopold Bloom in the lunch-time section of the book" from Abbey Street to the gate of the National Museum.

The plaques were sponsored by Cantrell & Cochrane (Dublin) Limited, an Irish manufacturer, marketer and distributor of alcoholic and soft drinks.

== List of locations ==
Order	Photograph	Location and coordinates	Extract from Ulysses	Notes
1		Middle Abbey Street 53.348366°N 6.260461°W	"AEOLUS - the offices of the Evening Telegraph"	
2		O'Connell Street Lower 53.347991°N 6.259802°W	"Pineapple rock, lemon platt, butter scotch... among the warm sweet fumes of Graham Lemon's"	Situated in front of the former 'Confectioners Hall' of Lemon & Co. confectioners (as of 2026 in use as a Foot Locker store)
3		Bachelors Walk 53.20507°N 6.15337°W	"As he set foot on O'Connell bridge a puffball of smoke plumed up from the parapet"	
4		Aston Quay 53.346745°N 6.259326°W	"Mr Bloom smiled O rocks at two windows of the ballast office"	
5		Westmoreland Street 53.346276°N 6.258935°W	"Hot mockturtle vapour and steam of newbaked jampuffs rolypoly poured out from Harrison's"	
6		College Street 53.345187°N 6.258972°W	"He crossed under Tommy Moore's roguish finger. They did right to put him up over a urinal: meeting of the waters"	Situated in front of a statue of Thomas Moore (1779–1852), Irish writer and poet
7		Grafton Street 53.343137°N 6.259293°W	"He crossed at Nassau street corner and stood before the window of Yeates and Son, pricing the field glasses"	
8		Grafton Street 53.342842°N 6.259401°W	"Mr Bloom, quick breathing, slowlier walking, passed Adam court"	
9		Grafton Street 53.342373°N 6.259600°W	"He passed, dallying, the windows of Brown Thomas, silk mercers"	Situated in front of Brown Thomas department store
10		Duke Street 53.341925°N 6.259379°W	"He entered Davy Byrne's. Moral pub. He doesn't chat"	Situated in front of Davy Byrne's pub
11		Duke Street 53.341855°N 6.258682°W	"His heart astir he pushed in the door of the Burton restaurant"	
12	TBC	Dawson Street 53.20302°N 6.15295°W	"-You're in Dawson street, Mr. Bloom said. Molesworth street is opposite. Do you want to cross? There's nothing in the way"	Outside of Butler's cafe.
13		Molesworth Street 53.341208°N 6.256812°W	"Walking by Doran's publichouse he slid his hand between waistcoat and trousers and, pulling aside his shirt gently, felt a slack fold of his belly"	Situated in front of Anglo Irish Bank head office, as of 2026
14		Kildare Street 53.340599°N 6.255264°W	"His hand looking for the where did I put found in his hip pocket soap lotion have to call tepid paper stuck. Ah soap there I yes. Gate. Safe!"	Situated in front of the entrance to the National Museum of Ireland – Archaeology

== See also ==
- List of public art in Dublin
