= Grace Weir =

Irish visual artist

Grace Weir (fl. 1990's – present) is an Irish sculptor and interdisciplinary artist from Dublin. She is a member of Aosdána. She created "Wavelength", the winners' trophy for the 1994 Eurovision Song Contest.

She represented Ireland at the Biennale in 2001, and was featured as The Guardian's "artist of the week" in April 2009.

Her sculpture, Trace, outside St. Stephen's Green stood for 25 years until 2017. She has also created films such as "A Reflection on Light" in 2016 for Trinity College and "Time Tries All Things" in 2019 for the Institute of Physics.
