= Peter Grant (sculptor) =

Irish sculptor (1915–2003)

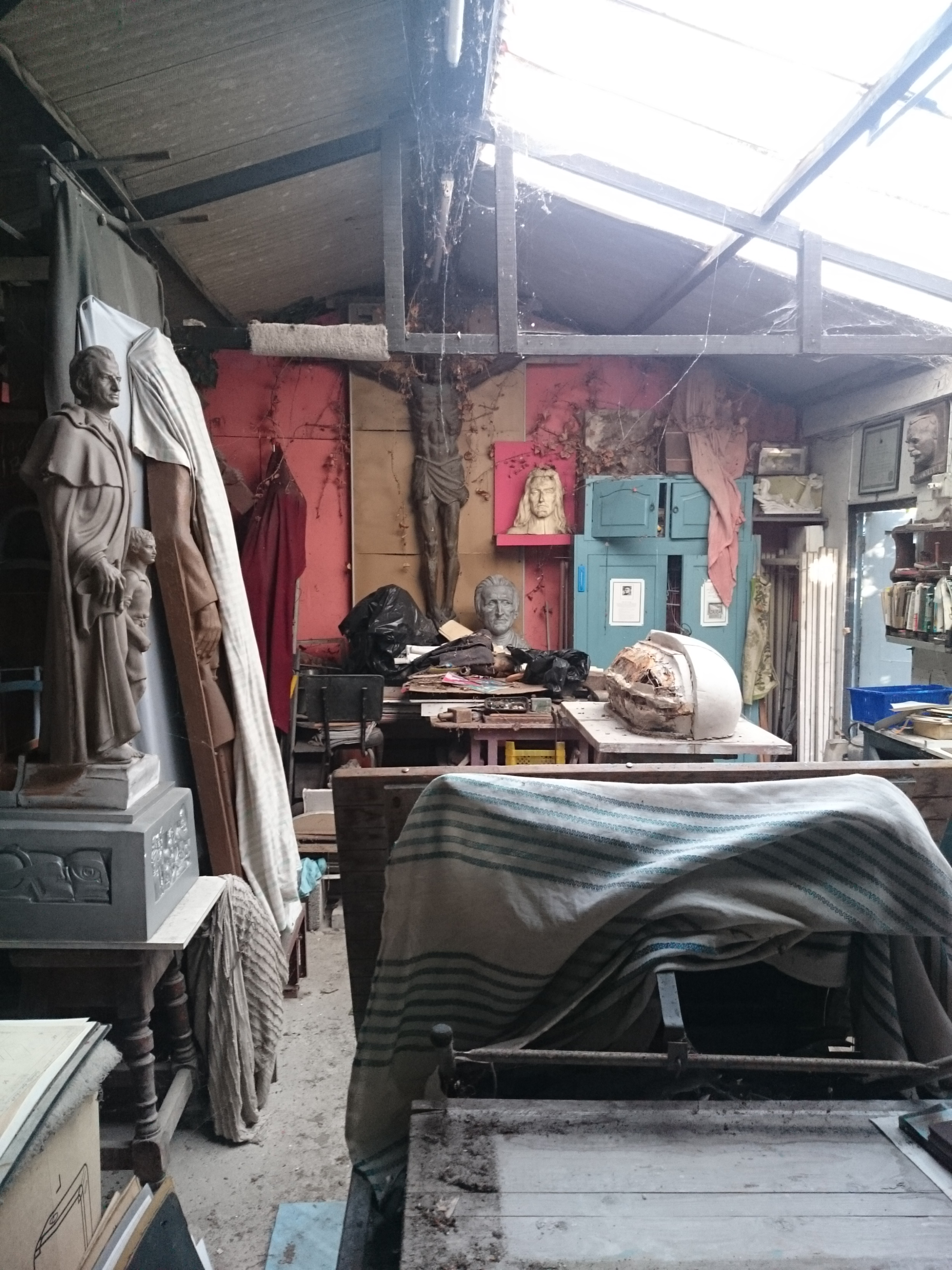

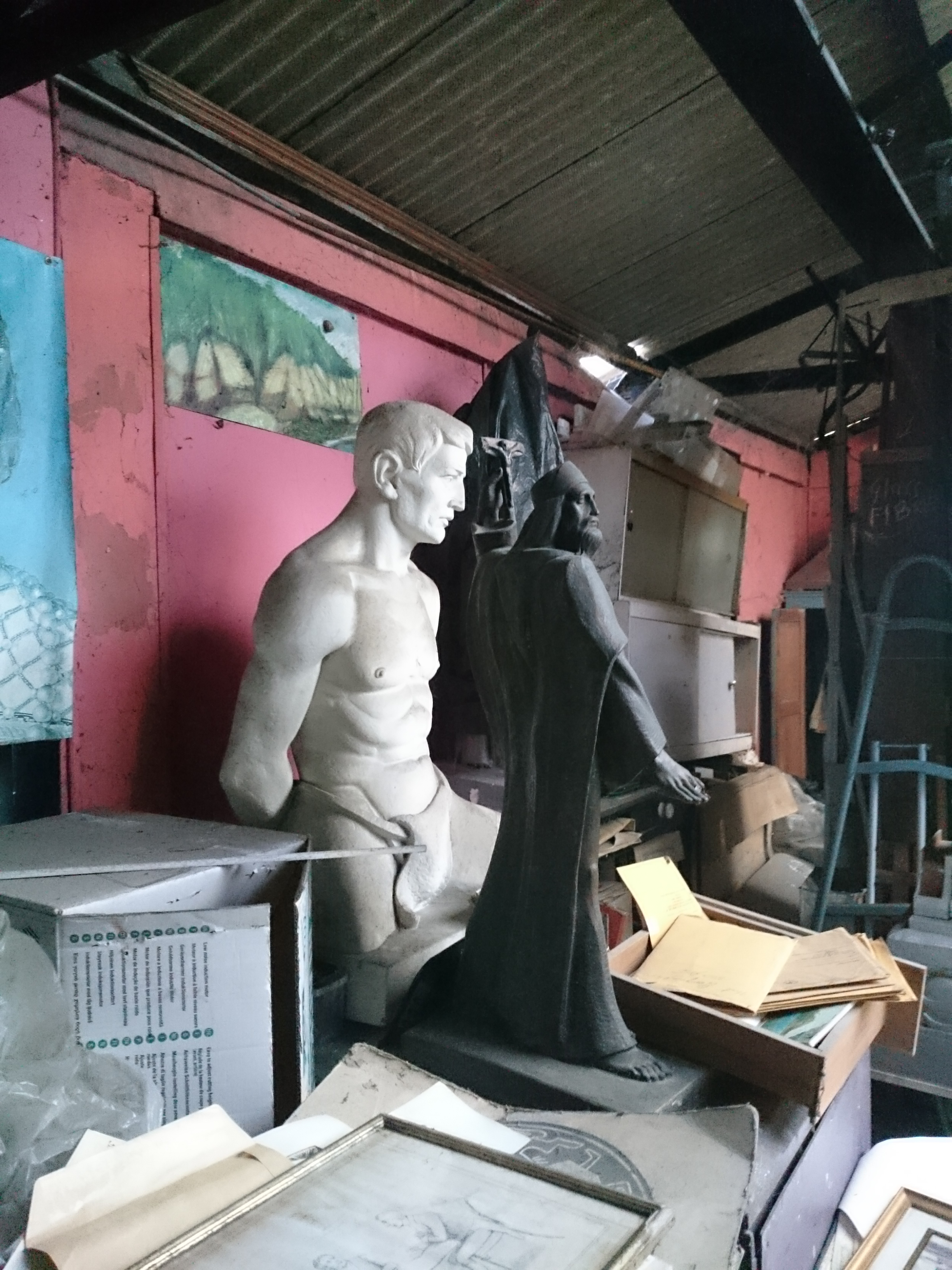

Peter Grant (5 December 1915 – 12 February 2003) was an Irish sculptor. He was born at Pomeroy, County Tyrone, Grant moved to Dublin with his family in 1922. He studied at the Dublin Metropolitan School of Art (National College of Art) from 1933. He received prize medals for modelling in 1935 and 1936. He won a scholarship for 1935–38. His work was influenced by Middle Eastern art. This is visible in Moses the Lawgiver, which won the Taylor Art scholarship at the RDS in 1937. He was commissioned to model the 'Warrior of Ancient Ireland' for the 1939 New York World's Fair. His bust of Joseph Mary Plunkett, one of the signatories of the 1916 Easter Rising, is exhibited in Dáil Éireann.

Grant was a founding member, and first chairman, of the Institute of Sculptors of Ireland. He was married to Una Mac Eoin on 26 January 1960. He retired from the National College of Art and Design in 1980 but continued to work in his studio in Clontarf. He died on 12 February 2003.

His life and work are recounted in 'Peter Grant: a Dublin sculptor' by John Turpin. His work was also the subject of a documentary, "The Sculptor Peter Grant" by Dominique Davoust.
