= Remco de Fouw =

Irish sculptor

Remco de Fouw (born 1962) is an Irish sculptor. He has created on commission many sculptures, which stand in locations in Ireland and the UK.

== Life ==
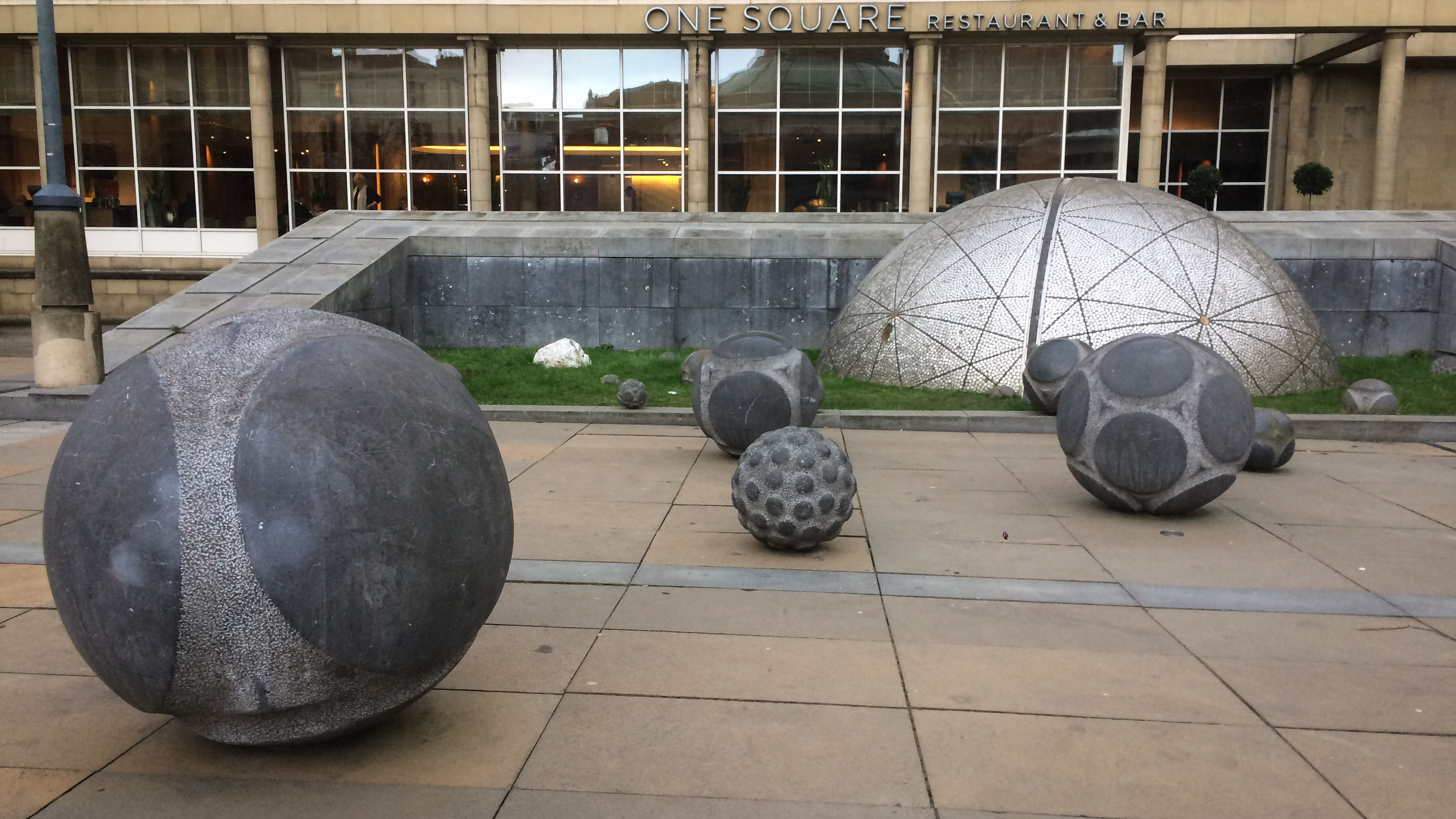
"First Conundrum", in Festival Square, Edinburgh

De Fouw initially trained as a carpenter, later graduating from the National College of Art and Design in 1991. He has given several solo exhibitions and has taken part in group exhibitions. Awards include the Cream of Irish Award in Sculpture in 1997, and he has received three Arts Council Bursaries. He has produced many sculptures by public commission.

== Works ==
De Fouw's works include the following:

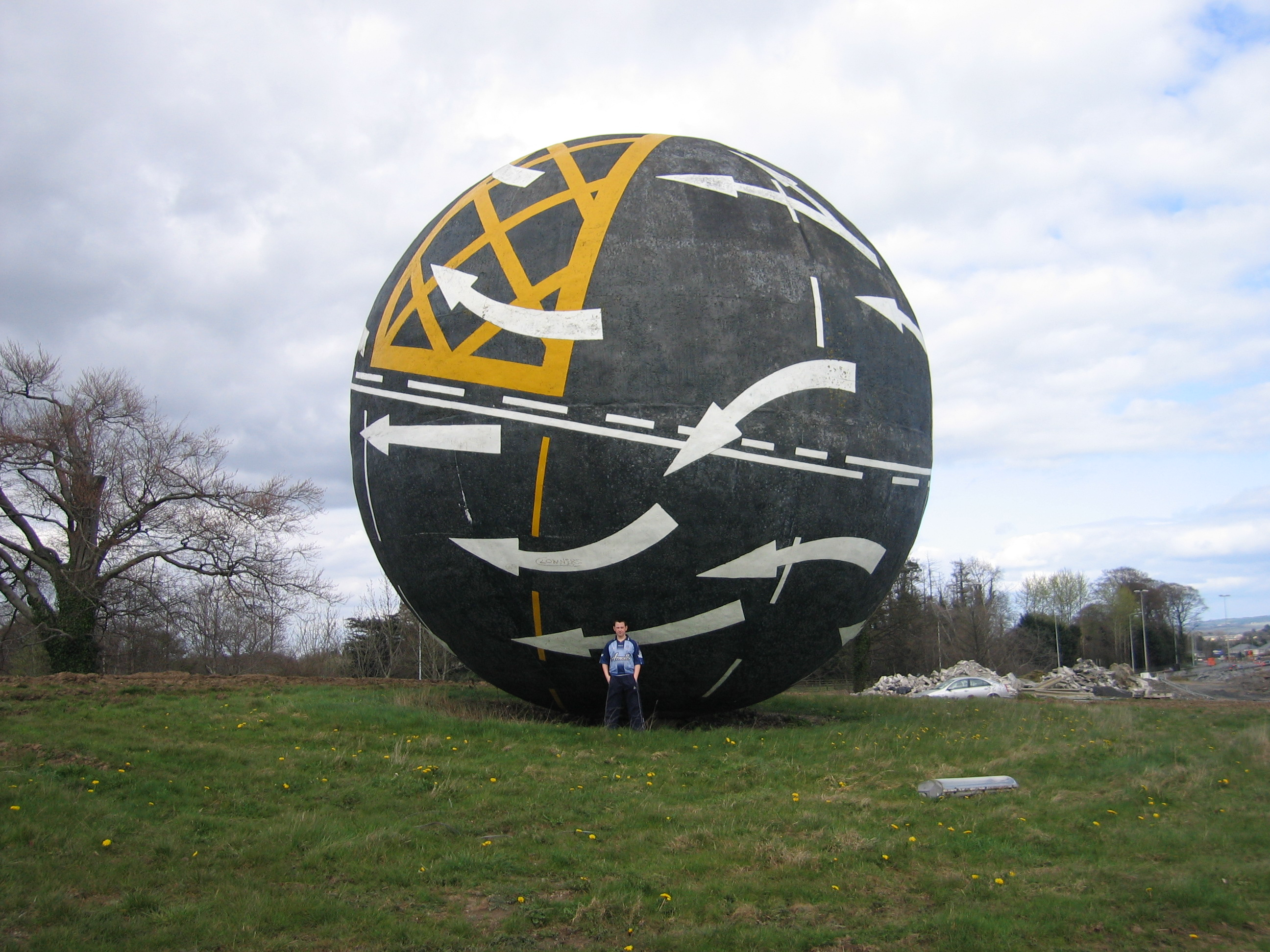
"Perpetual Motion", near the M7 motorway in County Kildare

"Perpetual Motion" (1996) by de Fouw and Rachel Joynt, was commissioned by Kildare County Council. It is by the M7 motorway near Naas in County Kildare. It is a sphere, diameter 9 metres (30 ft), on which various road markings are depicted, suggesting movement around a globe. It is described in publicart.ie as "probably Ireland's best known sculpture".

"First Conundrum" (2001) is in Festival Square, Edinburgh, and was commissioned by the City of Edinburgh Council and Scottish Enterprise. It is a group of spherical forms of varied size and material.

"Waggle Dance" (2015}, by de Fouw and Rachel Joynt, is in front of the Iontas Building at Maynooth University, County Kildare. The sculpture, diameter 3 metres (9.8 ft), has a large aperture showing an internal cellular structure, as might be seen in a beehive (hence the term "waggle dance"). Its geometry and complexity relates to the intellectual endeavour of the university.

"Random Access Memory V" won the inaugural Royal College of Surgeons in Ireland Art Award in 2016. It was chosen from a shortlist of five works shown at the annual exhibition of the Royal Hibernian Academy. The award included a commission for a new work that would be housed in the college.
