= Linda Brunker =

Irish sculptor

- Education: National College of Art and Design
- Notable work: The Wishing Hand, Spirit of Speed
- Relatives: Amanda Brunker
- Website: www.lindabrunker.com

Linda Brunker (born 13 March 1966) is an Irish sculptor. She has received several high profile commissions, including public sculptures.

== Early life ==
Brunker grew up in Glasnevin, Dublin. Brunker went to Mount Temple Comprehensive School and then attended the National College of Art and Design from 1983 to 1988. Her sister is Amanda Brunker, a journalist, novelist and former Miss Ireland.

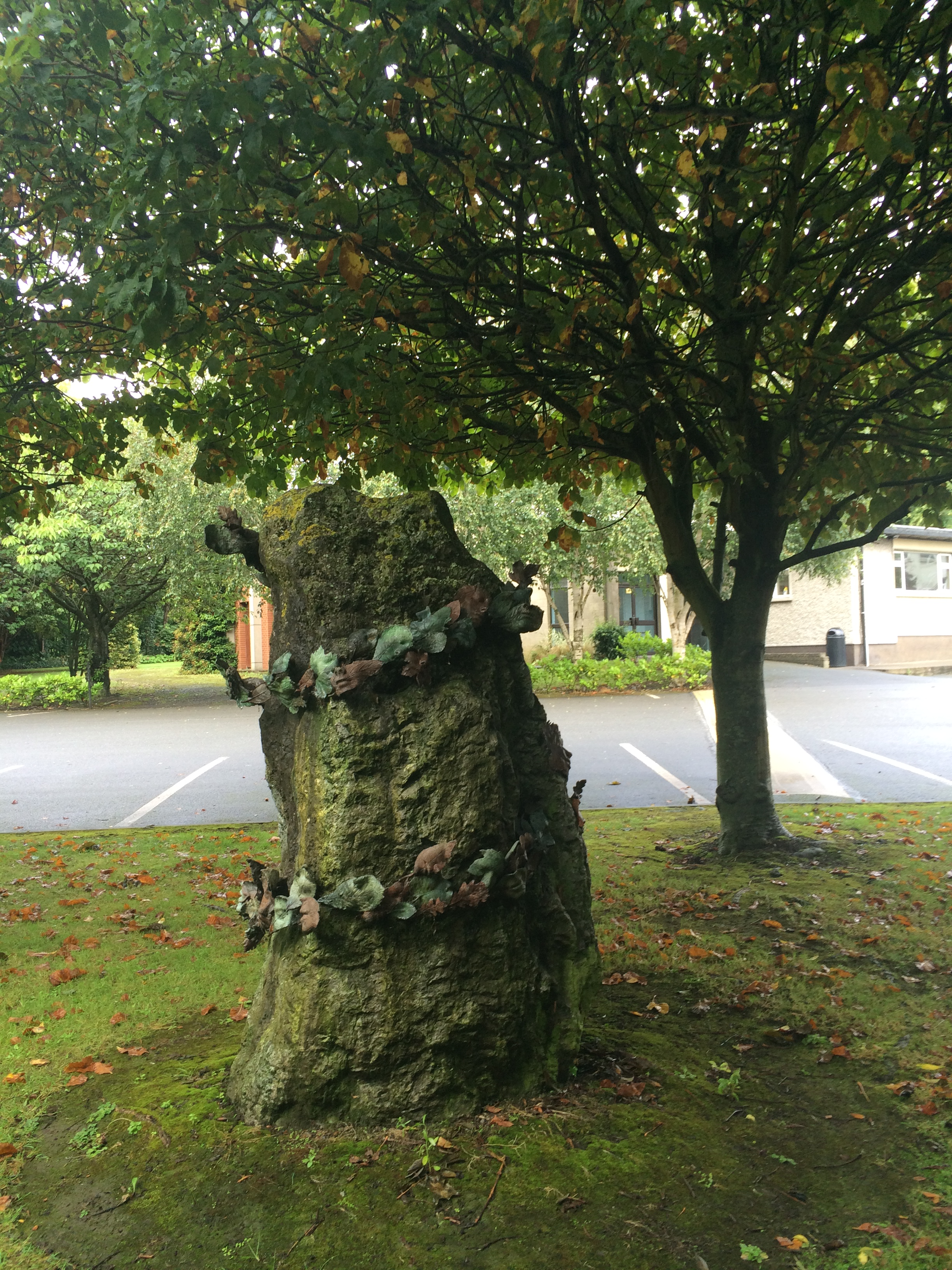
A sculpture by Linda Brunker in the grounds of Mount Temple Comprehensive School

== Career ==
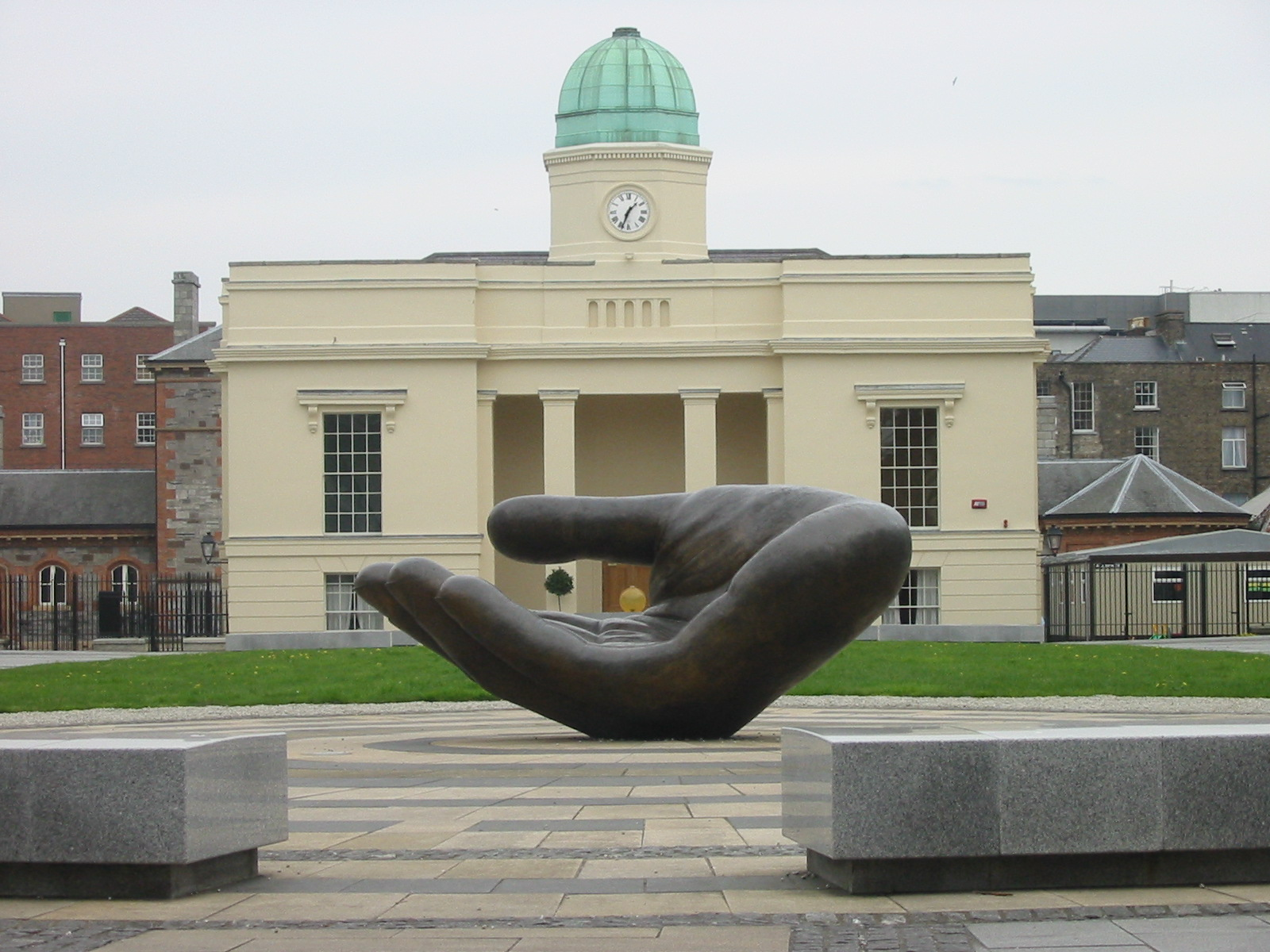
The Wishing Hand sculpture, by Linda Brunker, in the grounds of the Department of Education

After leaving the National College of Art and Design in 1988, Brunker became a full-time sculptor, initially taking commissions from a number of clients. Her art favours figures expressing movement, often in bronze. Brunker's work has been acquired by private collectors, and commissioned for corporations and public artworks. Some examples of her public art include the Voyager 1 at Laguna Beach, California, The Wishing Hand at the Department of Education and Youth in Ireland and Gaia's Garden in Suzhou, China.
