= Brian King (sculptor) =

Irish sculptor (1942 – 2017)

- Born: 13 October 1942; Dublin, Ireland
- Died: 16 April 2017 (aged 74)
- Education: National College of Art and Design
- Known for: sculpture, land art
- Movement: Modern sculpture
- Children: 3
- Elected: Aosdána

Brian King (13 October 1942 – 16 April 2017) was an Irish sculptor. He mostly worked in large-scale metal sculptures in an abstract, minimalist style, as well as in environmental art and land art.

== Early life ==
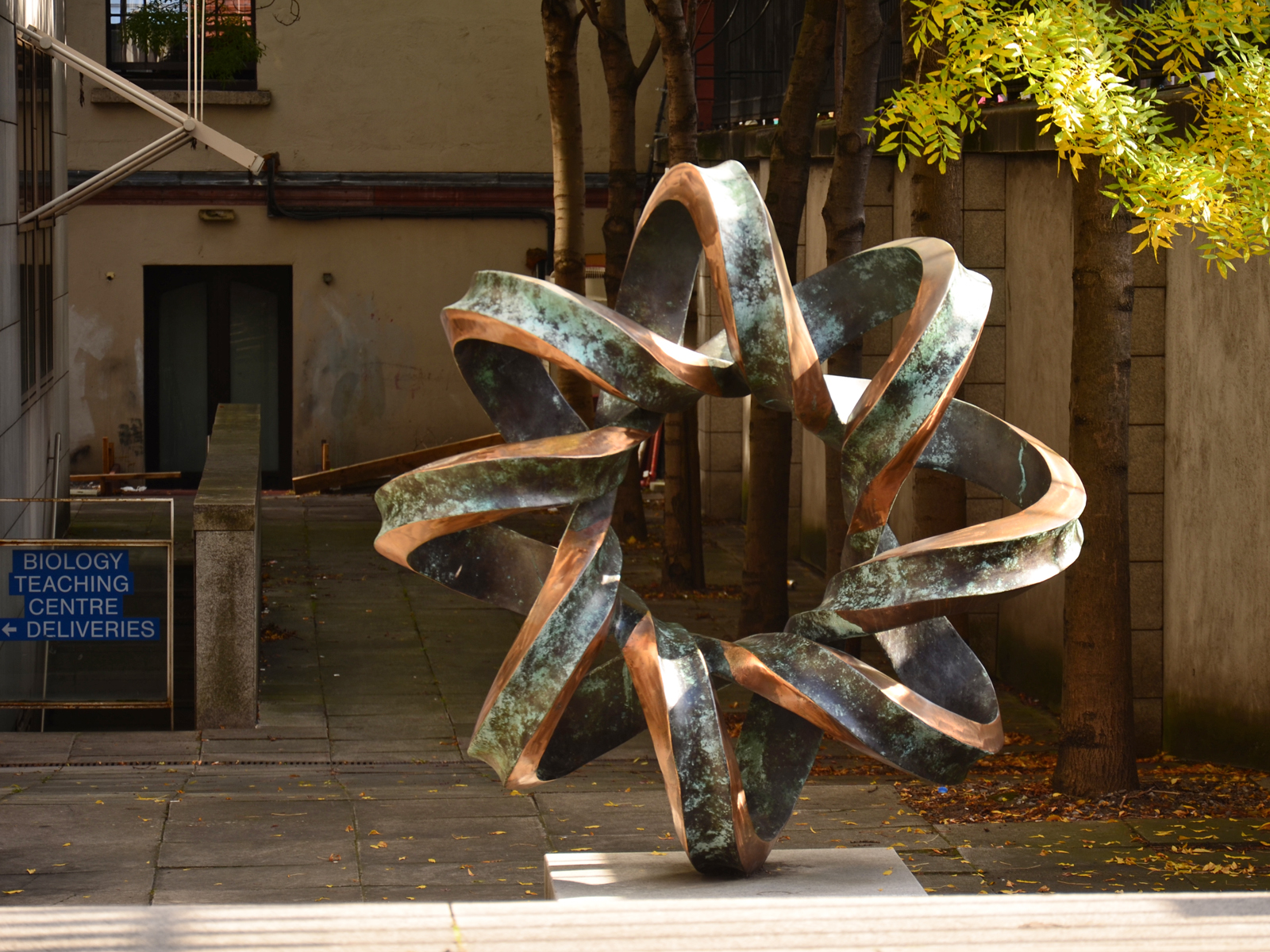
Double Helix (Trinity College, Dublin)

Brian King was born in Dublin in 1942. He graduated from National College of Art and Design (NCAD, Dublin) in 1963.

== Career ==
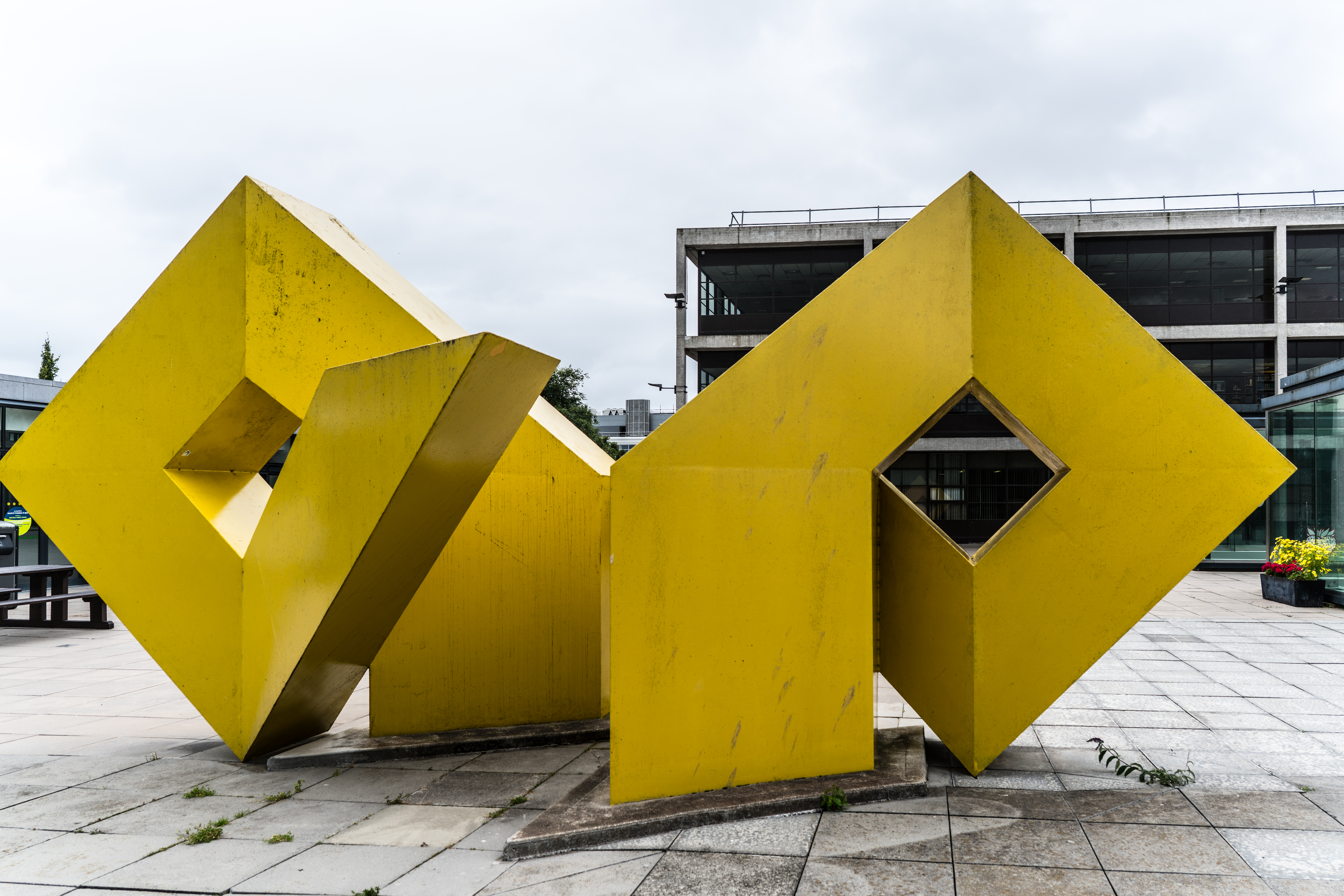
Galway Yellow (NUI Galway)

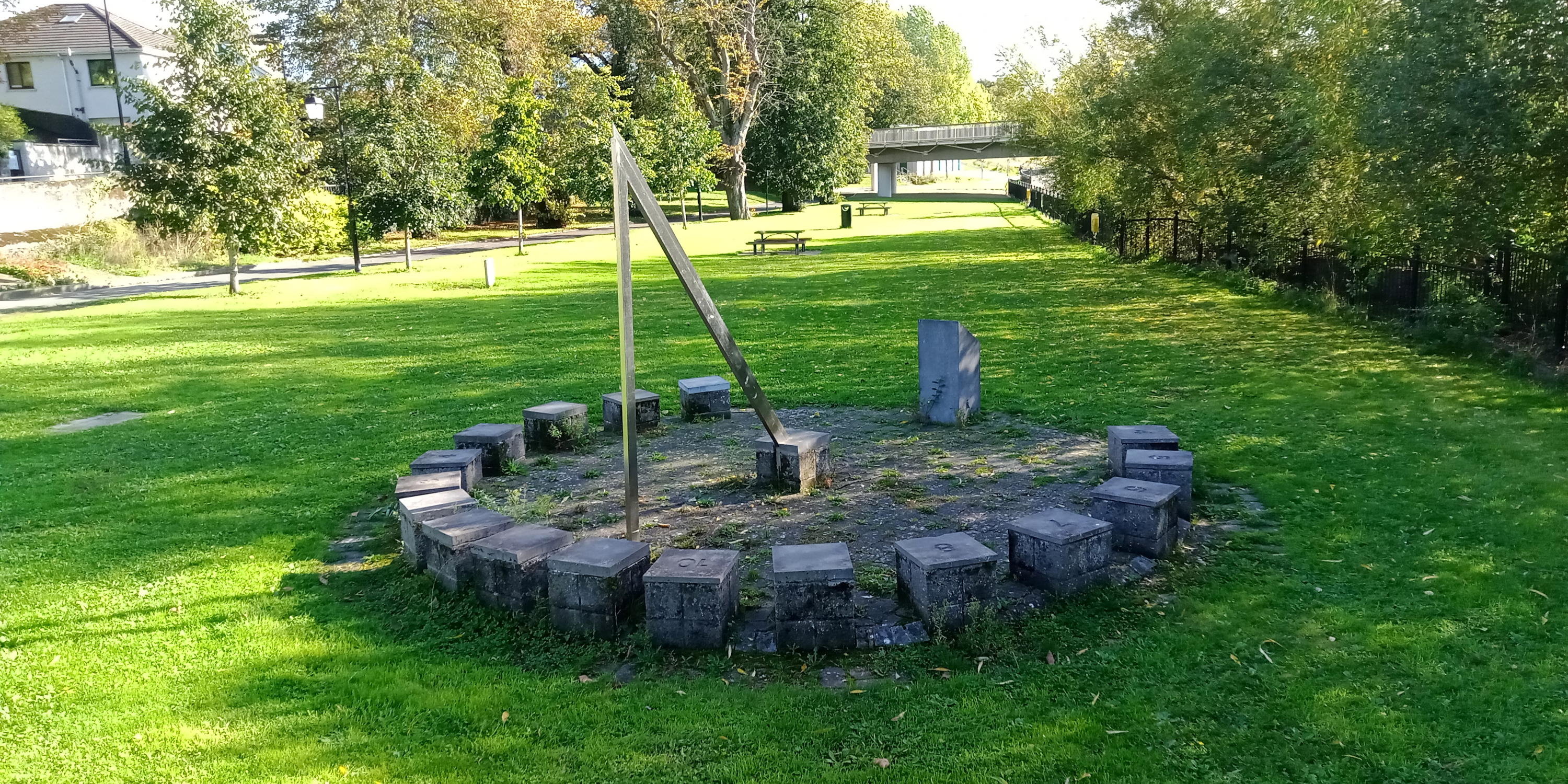
Title, X and O by King (Peace Park, Kilkenny)

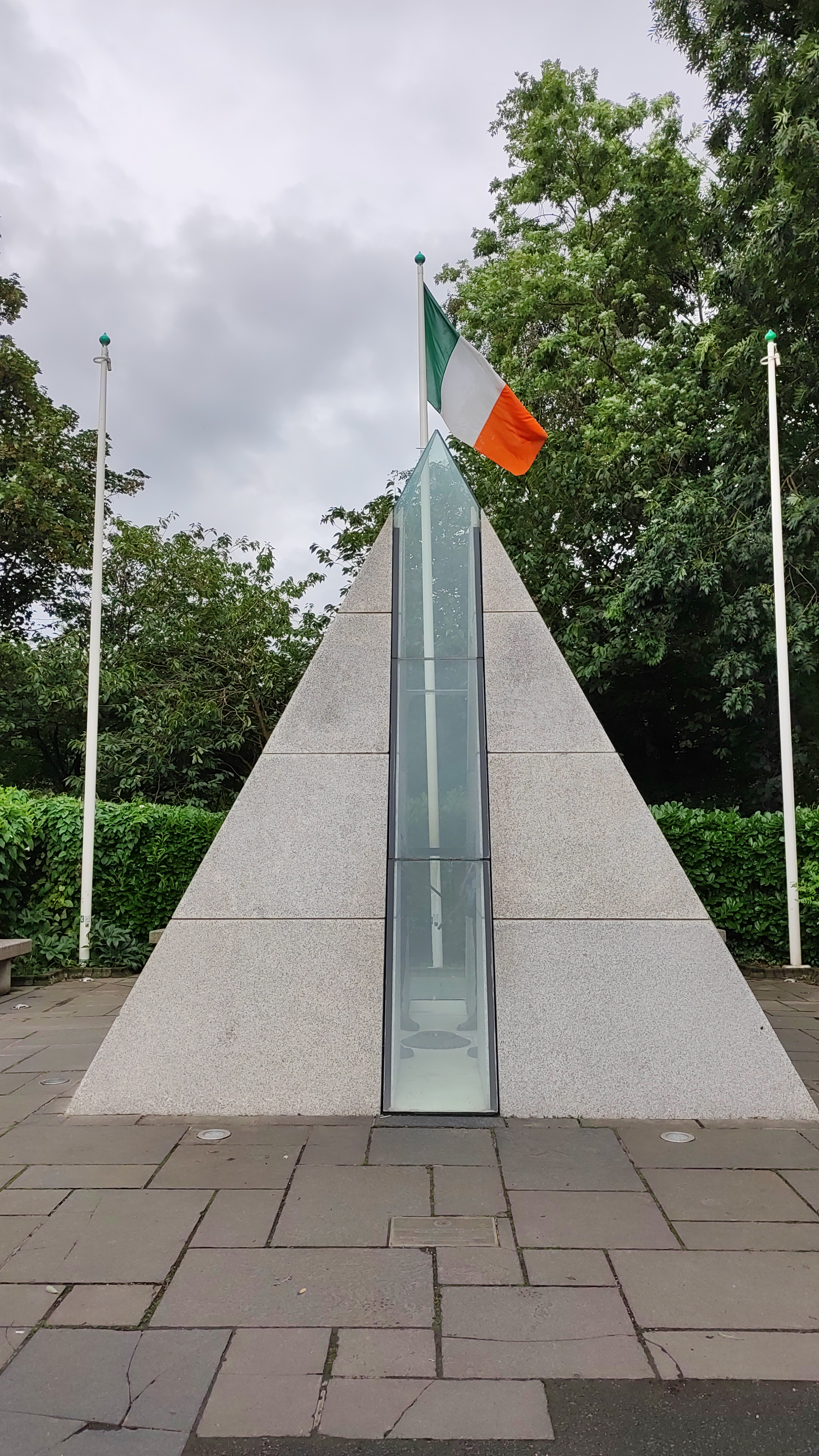
Memorial to deceased members of the Irish Defence Forces (Merrion Square, Dublin)

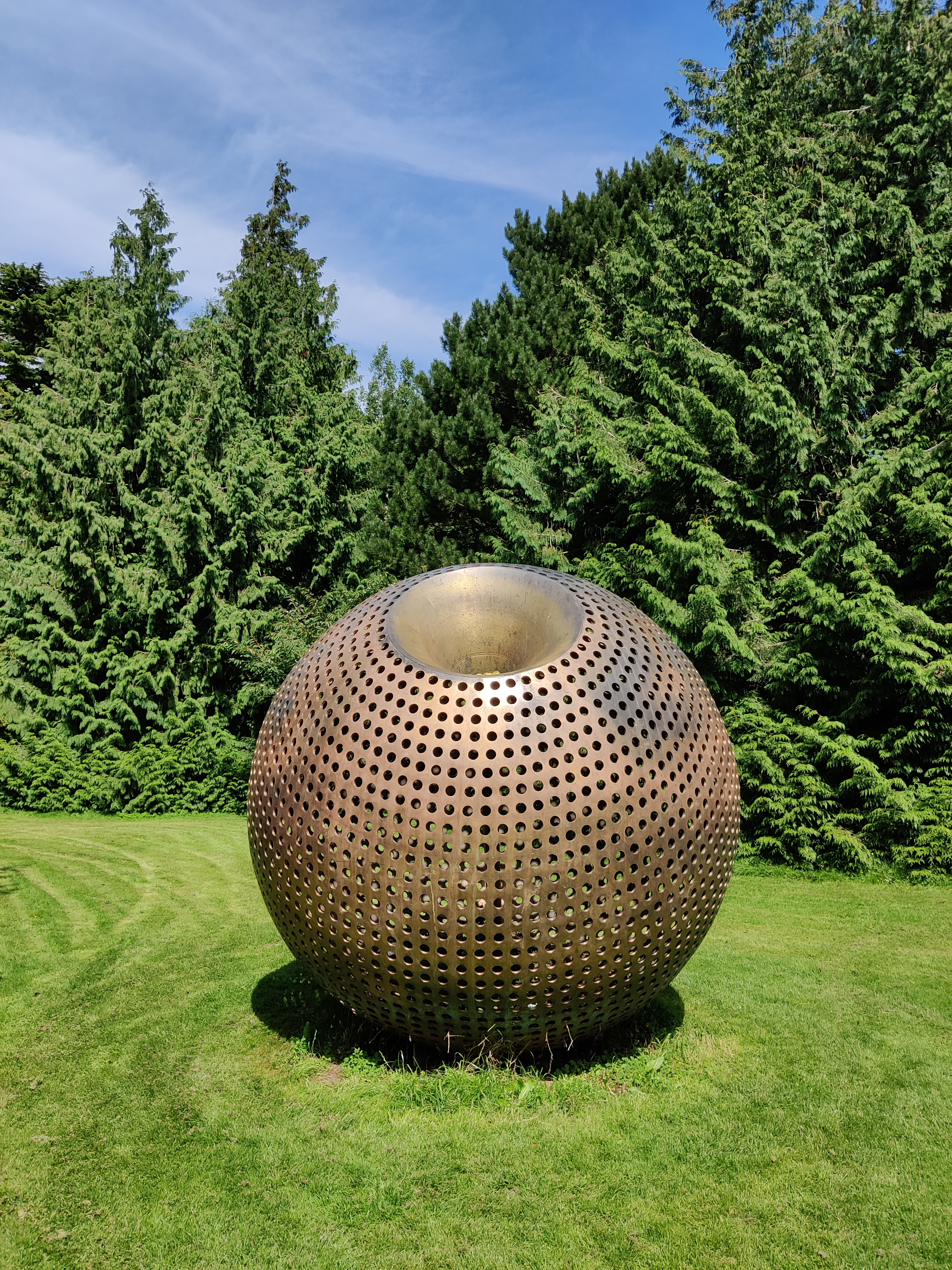
Farmleigh Convergence (Farmleigh House, Dublin)

King participated in the Irish Exhibition of Living Art from 1964 to 1978, winning the Carroll Award there in 1965. He was the event's presiding officer from 1968 to 1978. In 1969 and 1983 he represented Ireland at the Paris Biennale; he won the Biennale's major individual prize in 1969, the first Irish artist to do so.

His early work was minimalist and was compared to J. S. Bach's music.

He taught at NCAD from 1984 to 2004, becoming head of the sculpture department.

=== Holdings ===
King produced many pieces of public art, found around Ireland. King's work is also held in many public collections, including those of Dublin's Hugh Lane Municipal Gallery, Cork's Crawford Municipal Gallery, University College Dublin and the University of Ulster, as well as the semi-public collection of RTÉ and the private collections of Bank of Ireland and Allied Irish Banks.

== Personal life ==
King suffered ill health due to working with resin without proper protection. He died in 2017.
