= Mayor Square =

Square in Dublin, Ireland

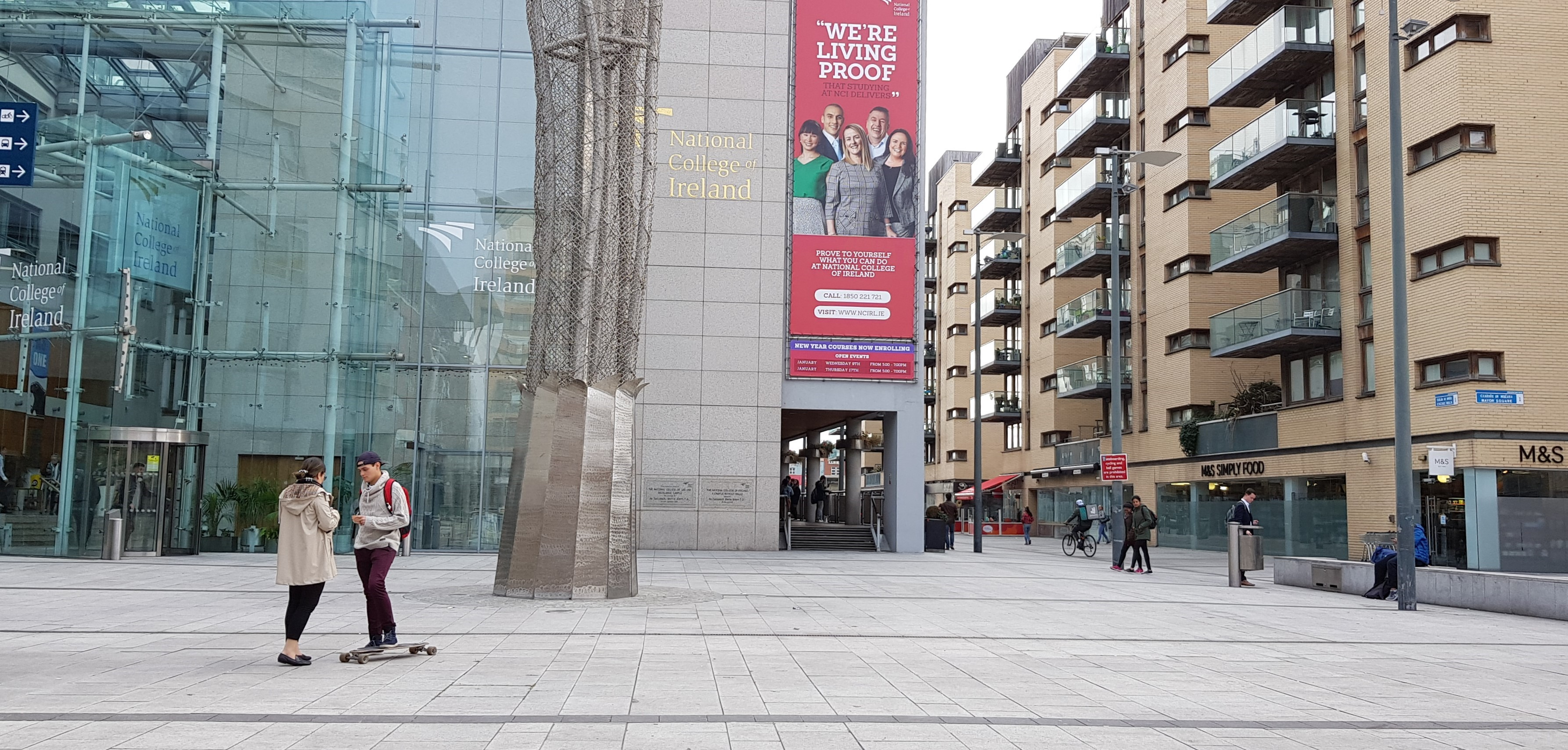
- NCI at Mayor Square, Dublin

- Location within Central Dublin
- Native name: Cearnóg an Mhéara (Irish)
- Namesake: Mayor Street
- Area: 2,000 square metres (0.49 acres)
- Location: Dublin, Ireland
- Postal code: D01
- Coordinates: 53.3492°N 6.2433°W

Mayor Square (Irish: Cearnóg an Mhéara) is in Dublin, in the Docklands area. The National College of Ireland is based there.

Since December 2009, the Mayor Square - NCI Luas stop has been served by the Luas Red Line tram which runs from Tallaght or Saggart to Connolly and the Docklands branch line from Busáras to The Point (3Arena). Dublin Bus serves nearby North Wall Quay with the 33d, 33x, 53a, 90, 142 and 151 bus services, as well as Guild Street with the 757 Airlink service to Dublin Airport.
