= Carmel Gunning =

Irish composer and musician

- Born: Carmel Gunning; Geevagh, County Sligo, Ireland
- Occupations: Musician and Music Teacher
- Years active: 1969–present

Carmel Gunning is an Irish composer and musician, from Sligo, Ireland. Gunning is one of Ireland's most accomplished tin whistle players who is also known for her singing and flute playing and also plays guitar and button accordion. Gunning's rich stylised form of whistle playing and tradition stems from her homeland of Geevagh in South County Sligo. This background and tradition aided Gunning's introduction to traditional Irish music which took place at an early age.

== Musical beginnings ==
Gunning was introduced to traditional Irish music as a child when her father, Tom Nangle, would teach her old tunes by lilting or whistling them to her.

In 1969 she sang in her first band, "Carmel and the Chrystals", and played at local dances in Keadue, Geevagh, Boyle and surrounding areas. Playing in the band with Gunning was her brother, Tom Nangle Jnr., Tony Mullaney, Kevin Conlon and his brother. Gunning won the All-Ireland tin whistle slow airs competition at the Fleadh Cheoil in 1976 and senior Scór title for "Music Instrument" section, which incorporates all musical instruments used in traditional Irish music including the fiddle, uilleann pipes, accordion and harp as well as the tin whistle.

Throughout the late 1970s and the 1980s Gunning could be frequently found with P. J. Hernon, Mick Shannon, Joe O'Dowd and others at the famous sessions which took place at the Trades Club in Sligo Town.

== Musical style ==
Gunning is noted for her fast-paced tin whistle style common of fiddle, flute and tin whistle of the "South Sligo" tradition or style. Gunning's reputation in the wider world was expanded by the release of her first solo recording, The Lakes of Sligo, which features four unaccompanied songs as well as 14 tracks of virtuosic tin whistle playing.

A reviewer of her music noted that "no modern tin whistler can escape comparison to Mary Bergin, and Carmel's playing does indeed remind some of the Dublin-born star. If anything, however, Gunning plays reels with a more insistent headlong drive. Her ornamentation is also more diverse, featuring many tongued triplets in imitation of the bowed embellishments popular among Sligo fiddlers".

== Teaching and instructing ==
Gunning has tutored MA and BA music students at the University of Limerick. She recently celebrated her 45th anniversary as a music teacher in 2014 and has endeavoured to pass on the Sligo musical tradition to younger players. Among former pupils of the Carmel Gunning School of Music is flute and whistle master Liam Kelly of the group Dervish, Orlaith McAuliffe, London, Olivia McTernan and June McCormack among others.

She has played Irish music around the world playing concerts from Norway to Australia and from America to Japan. In 2006, Gunning lead the St. Patrick's Day parade and played a number of concerts in Perth, Australia and in March 2007 she undertook a tour of Massachusetts, USA where she played a various venues giving masterclasses to experienced student and playing concerts.

She is the organiser of Carmel Gunning School of Music, Sligo Town. Gunning founded a summer school festival in the 1990s and it attracts pupils from across Ireland, the United Kingdom, Europe and the United States.

== Discography ==
=== Albums ===
- The Lakes of Sligo (1995)
- Around St. James's Well (1995)
- Carmel Sings Country (2002)
- The Sligo Maid (2004)
- Lament for the Birds Jack Harte Featured Appearance (2005)
- The Sound of Coleman Country Various Artists Featured Appearance (2006)
- Corran Hill

   Cathair Shligigh.(2019)

=== Albums and track lists ===
Information
The Lakes of Sligo
- Accompanied by Altan guitar player Mark Kelly and Robbie Walsh on bodhran
- Released 1990
- Track list:
  - 1. The Pidgeon on the Gate, The Devils of Dublin 2:14
  - 2. The Castleblayney Piper, The Road to Maugheraboy 2:05
  - 3. McDermotts Reel, The Old Maid 2:13
  - 4. Siuil a Riuin 3:01
  - 5. O'Carolans Concerto 3:09
  - 6. The Swallows Nest, The Geevagh Jig 2:23
  - 7. The Lakes of Sligo 3:00
  - 8. The Sweeps 2:21
  - 9. The Dublin Reel, Title Unknown 2:05
  - 10. The Fiddler of Dooney, The Connaught Man's Rambles 2:02
  - 11. The Name Unknown 2:11
  - 12. The Lady's Earring, Ailbhe Kate 2:16
  - 13. The lamb's on the Green Hills 5:02
  - 14. The Sligo Maid, The Boys of Ballisodare 1:55
  - 15. Bean Dubh aGhleanna 3:02
  - 16. Paddy Get Up, Burke's Jig 2:05
  - 17. The Grave of Wolfe Tone 4:33
  - 18. Tom Ward's Downfall, The House of Hamill 1:58
Around St.James's Well
- Released 1995
- Accompanied by Neil Mulligan (uilleann pipes), Vincent Harrison (fiddle), Mark Kelly (guitar) and Eric Doyle and Ronald Flanagan on bodhran.
- Track list:
  - 1. Reels: Caher Rua / The Bucks of Oranmore
  - 2. Jigs: Name Unknown / The Lads on the Mountain / Bride's Favourite
  - 3. Reels: Quinn's / Devanney's Goat / The All Ireland Fleadh Cheoil in Sligo
  - 4. Song: Around St. James' Well
  - 5. Bardance: The Curlew Hills
  - 6. Air: Lament for Fred Finn
  - 7. Hornpipes: Carmel Gunning's / Callaghan's
  - 8. Song: There's a Path across the Ocean
  - 9. Reels: Charlie Lennon's / Mason's Apron
  - 10. Jigs: Fintan's Favourite / Tatter Jack Walsh
  - 11. Reels: Paddy O'Brien's / That the Velvet
  - 12. Song: Lament for Laurence McDonagh
  - 13. Reels: Willie Coleman's / The Star of Munster
  - 14. Air: Roisin Dubh
  - 15. Hornpipes: Dunphy's / The Fairy Hornpipe
  - 16. Songs: The Banks of the Roses
  - 17. Waltzes: Mrs. Kenny's Waltz / Aursundyals
  - 18. Reels: Sally Gardens / Sligo Dandy
Carmel Sings Country
- Released 2002
- Track list:
  - 1. There You Go
  - 2. You Hurt Me Once – No More
  - 3. Good Friendship Is The Best
  - 4. My Old Sligo Home
The Sligo Maid
- Accompanied by Charlie Lennon on Piano and Junior Davey on Bodhran.
- Released 2004
- Track list:
  - 1. Reels: Mrs. McLeod's / Queen Maeve
  - 2. Jigs: John Paul & Leonard / The Geevagh Jig
  - 3. Reels: Fr. O'Grady's Farewell to Baca / New Year's Night
  - 4. Slip Jigs: Hardiman the Fiddler / Fig for a Kiss
  - 5. Air: Lament for Paddy Tunney
  - 6. Reels: The Master's Return / The Mossy Banks
  - 7. Flings: Were You at the Fair / Willie Clancy's Fling
  - 8. Reels: The Glencar / Cregg's Pipes / Killoran's
  - 9. Jigs: Let Us Be Drinking / Noon Day Feast / The Horse that Mada a Hames of his Winkers
  - 10. Reels: The Mayo Lassies / The Star of Munster / The Red Bee
  - 11. Hornpipes: Pretty Maggie Morrissey / Murphy's Hornpipe
  - 12. Reels: The Maid of Mt Kisco / The Foxhunter
  - 13. Reels: Dan Breen's / Martin Wynne's No. 3
  - 14. Reels: Lord Gordon / The Mason's Apron
Lament for the Birds
- Artist Jack Harte (spoken word), featuring Carmel Gunning (music and song)
- Released 2005
  - This CD of stories and songs, thematically structured and integrated, features the author reading some of his stories set in his native Sligo,
  - Sligo singer/musician, Carmel Gunning, singing his lyrics and playing the traditional airs to which the songs were set.
  - The focus of the compilation is the sense of a tradition in Sligo stretching back to the era of mythology. The album was produced, edited and mastered by Jho Harris of All Points West in Culfadda in County Sligo
The Sound of Coleman Country
- Released 2006
- Artists Carmel Gunning, P.J. Hernon, Peter Horan, John Dwyer, Collette Gaffney, Colm O'Donnell, Verona Ryan, Kevin Henry, Junior Davey, Hazel Shannon and Declan Folan
  - Review By Geoff Wallis at mustrad.org.uk
  - "This was the first, and perhaps still, in some ways, the best CD to be issued by the Coleman Heritage Centre in Gurteen, County Sligo".
  - "This extensive 20-track survey of the state of music in South Sligo is sponsored by Gurteen's Teach Murray pub"
  - "The liner notes state, the Centre's aim is to "promote the living tradition" and this CD is, in reality, an extensive tribute to the strength of the local musical heritage".
  - "tracks by singer and flute player Colm O'Donnell and his brother Séamuson flute, whistler and singer Carmel Gunning, the fiddles of Andrew Davey and Declan Folan and the presence of accordionist P.J Hernon, playing both with his son Domhnaill and the Swallows Tail Céilí Band.
  - "Flute player Peter Horan, accompanied twice each by guitarist Hazel Shannon and bodhrán player Junior Davey (son of Andrew)"

"Corran Hill", released in 2008. This is Carmel Gunnings 5th solo CD. It is a mixture of contemporary and Irish music and song.

Track list:

1. Song: Erin Gra Mo Chroi.
2. Song: An Greasai Brog.
3. Flings: Were You at the Fair
4. Song: Donal Og.
5. Song: Around St. James's Well.
6. Slow Air:An Chulfhionn.
7. Song: Katie Daly.
8. Reels:The Moving Cloud/The Old Bush.
9. Song: The Exile Far Away.
10. Reels Jean's Reel/Colonel Frazer's.
11. Song: The Geevagh Prisoners.
12. Jigs: Roger Sherlock's/Corran Hill (own composition)

Carmel is accompanied on her CD by Brendan Emmett and Paul Gurney. Special Guest: Orlaith McAuliffe, London.

== Books ==
Gunning, Carmel, ed. (2006). The Mountain Top. Sligo: Coleman Heritage Centre.
The book was launched at The Coleman Music Centre, Gurteen, County Sligo. It contains over sixty tunes popular in South Sligo and beyond with design and setting by Adrienne Lee.

Gunning, Carmel, ed. (2007). The Maid of Sweet Gurteen. Sligo: Coleman Heritage Centre. Shamrocks from Geevagh. This book of 40 songs was published by Carmel Gunning in 2019. The Sligo Maid – this book was published by Carmel Gunning in 2019 and consists of 64 of her compositions to mark her 50th year in the music industry.

== Podcast ==
Interview with Carmel Gunning recorded in May 2010 at http://www.podcasts.ie/featured-musicians/carmel-gunning/

Preceded by W. Paton	All-Ireland Fleadh tin whistle (slow air) Champions; 1976	Succeeded by Kevin Whitty

== See also ==
- Celtic music
- Irish Recorded Music Association
- Irish topics
- Irish traditional music session
