= Xiaonan Lu =

Canadian chemist and microbiologist

Xiaonan Lu is a Canadian microbiologist and chemist. He is a professor at the Faculty of Agricultural and Environmental Sciences of McGill University who is active in the field of food science.

== Awards ==
- Member, College of the Royal Society of Canada (2025)
- Fellow, American Chemical Society/AGFD (2025)
- Tier-1 Canada Research Chair in Food Safety (2025)
- W.J. Eva Award, Canadian Institute of Food Science & Technology (2024)
- Foods Young Investigator Award (2022)
- McGill Sustainability Education Fellow (2022)
- McGill William Dawson Scholar (2021)
- Young Scientist Award, Agricultural & Food Chemistry Division, American Chemical Society (2021)
- Samuel Cate Prescott Award, Institute of Food Technologists (2021)
- NSERC Discovery Accelerator Award (2019)
- UBC Peter Wall Scholar (2017)
- Larry Beuchat Young Researcher Award - International Association for Food Protection (2017)
- Young Scientist Excellence Award - International Union of Food Science and Technology (2015)

== See also ==
- Roman M. Balabin
- Colm O'Donnell

== Literature ==
- Brandie Weikle (2016-12-02) Is chocolate really good for you? UBC scientists make new tool to measure antioxidants // CBC/Radio-Canada.
- Anna Dimoff (2018-01-26) DNA barcoding reveals widespread seafood fraud in Metro Vancouver // CBC/Radio-Canada.

== Web-sources ==
- "Xiaonan Lu: Associate Professor, Food Science". Faculty of Land and Food Systems, University of British Columbia (UBC). 4 March 2016. Archived from the original on 2018-10-07.
