= Michael Bulfin =

Irish sculptor

- Born: 1939 (age 86–87)
- Education: University College Dublin; Yale University
- Known for: Sculpture

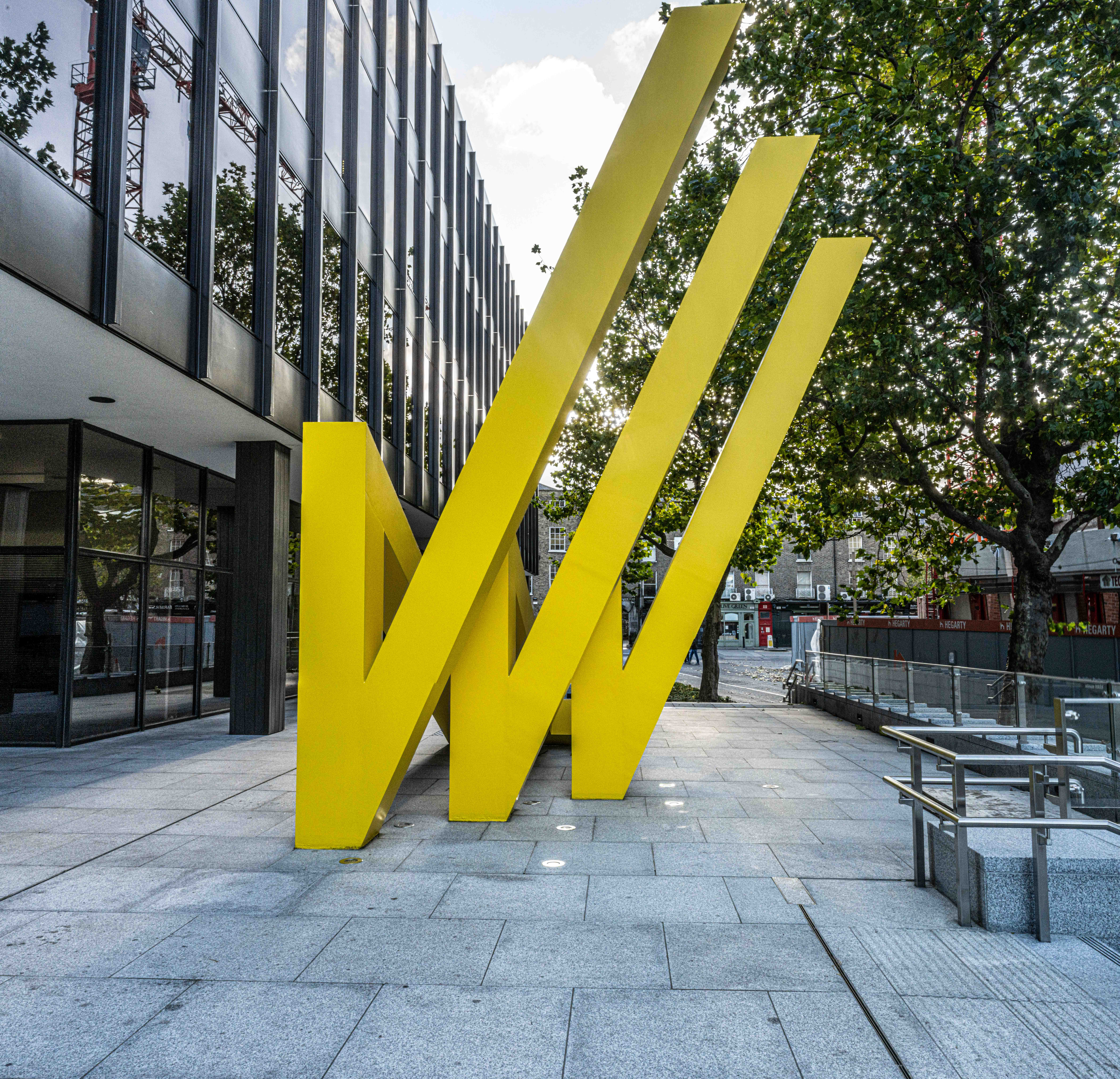
Bulfin's sculpture Reflections at Miesian Plaza, Dublin

Michael Bulfin (born 1939) is an Irish sculptor and visual artist, based in Dublin. He is the son of Irish republican Éamonn Bulfin and grandson of William Bulfin of Derrinlough, Birr, County Offaly. He was educated at University College Dublin and Yale University, Connecticut, USA. He was awarded a German Government Scholarship in 1965 to study at a research laboratory in Hamburg, Germany, German Academic Exchange Service (Deutsche Akademische Austauschdienst DAAD). He was chairman of the Project Arts Centre and the Sculptors Society of Ireland, and is a member of Aosdána.

His notable works include Reflections (1975) at the former Bank of Ireland Headquarters on Baggot Street, Dublin, A Walk Among Stone (1988) at Ballymun Flats (the sculpture and flats both since demolished), and Sky Train (2002) at Sculpture in the Parklands.

== Life and career ==
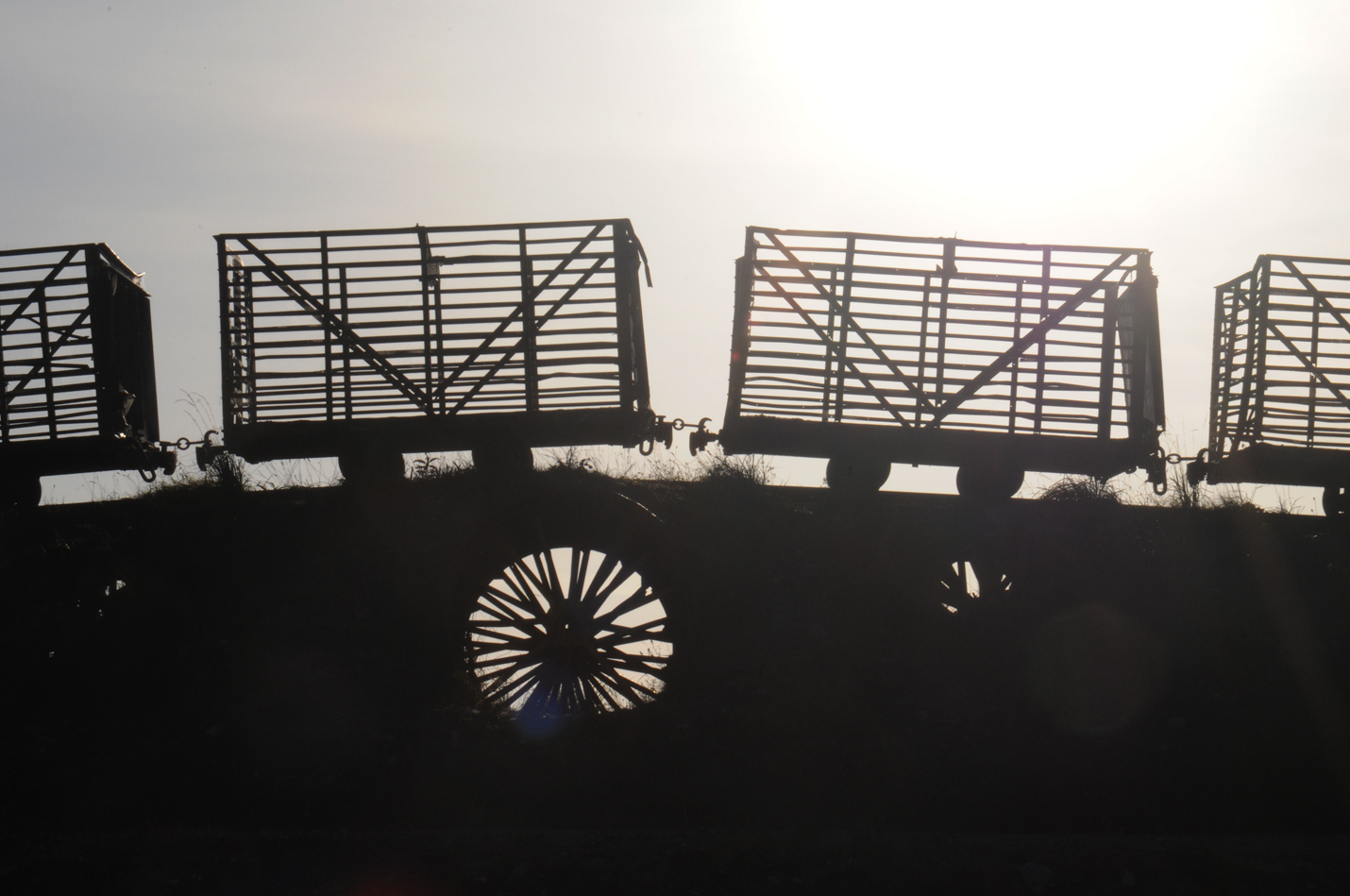
Sky Train at Sculpture in the Parklands

Bulfin's artistic career has been greatly influenced by the imagery he has encountered in his scientific career. While not his field he has also followed developments in astronomy, cosmology and nuclear science. As well as these influences his paintings and graphics - in particular - have been influenced by two different sources of scientific imagery: laboratory-created thin sections of soils and minerals viewed, through the microscope, under polarised light, which he studied in the laboratory in Germany. These slides which yielded abstract imagery of wondrous colour were a major influence on his early paintings. Satellite and air photo imagery of the earth's surface, which revealed shapes, colours and forms unseen from the surface were an influence on his later painting and graphic work.

For his contribution to the arts he was elected as a foundation member of Aosdana in 1981 Aosdana was established by the Irish Government, through the Arts Council of Ireland, in 1981 "to honour artists whose work has made an outstanding contribution to the creative arts in Ireland" He has had a lifelong dedication to contributing to the work of voluntary arts organisations. In 1967 he joined Project Arts Centre at its foundation and was executive chairman of Project from 1973 -1976 During his chairmanship of Project Arts Centre he moved the location of Project from its third temporary base on South King Street to its now permanent home on Essex Street in Temple Bar. He served as chairman of the Sculptors' Society of Ireland (now Visual Artists Ireland (1984-1992) In 1988 he was Chairman and chief organiser for the Sculptors' Society of the International Conference on Sculpture, Dublin - the first of its kind held in Europe. The three-day conference, held in Trinity College, Dublin, was attended by over 400 delegates from 38 countries. He has been on the advisory committees of various public art institutions including Dublin City Gallery The Hugh Lane. He has been an External Examiner for a number of Irish Colleges of Art.

== Public art ==
His sculpture - exemplified by the Crystic Series of sculptures - was influenced by the crystal shapes from his organic chemistry classes in university. The Electron Spin series (as seen in the OPW HQ sculpture in Trim) is based on the spin and movement of sub-atomic particles. The 'Reflections' series (Bank of Ireland Baggot Street, Dublin) is based on the path traced by light reflected from the different surfaces of the surrounding buildings.

=== Urban ===
His commissioned works on public view are listed below:

- Bank of Ireland HQ., Baggot St., Dublin (now Miesian Plaza)
- Garda Siochána HQ., Monaghan, Co, Monaghan
- Castlebar, Dublin Road Roundabout, County Mayo, Per Cent for Art Competition
- Dublin South County Council HQ Building, Per Cent for Art
- Office Public Works (OPW) HQ, Trim. County Meath

His competition-winning piece A Walk Among Stone (1988) in Ballymun, Dublin, won the Concrete Society of Ireland, Sculpture Award in 1990. (This piece was subsequently irreparably damaged during removal during the regeneration of the Ballymun district).

=== Land art ===
His scientific qualifications in environmental science, forestry and land use, which have given him a deep knowledge of landscape and its underlying landforms, geology and soil drew him inevitably to the whole field of Land art / Earth art / Environmental art / Site-specific art (often referred to as 'Art in Nature' in continental Europe). The pieces he contributed to this movement allowed him to combine both his scientific and artistic disciplines. As well as some small pieces he has contributed major pieces to several major Irish and European land art and environmental art symposia and projects. In these works, he has combined earthworks of soil with additions of stone or large found boulders to develop an integrated whole.

These works include:

- Our Shining Future Emerges?, West Cork Sculpture Trail
- Saurian Echos, Slate Quarries Sculpture Symposium, Ahenny, County Kilkenny
- Dreams and Stones, Castlewellan Forest Park, Castlewellan, County Down, Northern Ireland
- Deirbhile's Twist, Tir Saile, Mayo 5000 Sculpture Symposium, County Mayo
- Echoes of the past - Traces of the Future, Kraakamarken 'Art in Nature', Aarhus, Denmark
- Time Alone is Changeless, Sculpture in Woodland, Devil's Glen, Ashford, County Wicklow
- Sky Train, Lough Boora, Sculpture Park, County Offaly Sculpture in the Parklands.
