= Kevin O'Dwyer (silversmith) =

American silversmith

- Born: Kevin O'Dwyer; 1953 (age 72–73); Lindenhurst, New York, United States
- Education: Harriet Dreisseger, Chicago Bill Frederick, Chicago Heikki Seppa and John Cogswell, The School of the Art Institute, Chicago
- Known for: Design silversmithing sculpture
- Website: http://www.kevin-j-odwyer.com

Kevin O' Dwyer is an internationally exhibited artist whose works embrace the fields of design, metalworking and sculpture. He creates primarily in silver.

== Career ==
He began his training in 1979 with jeweller Harriet Dreissigger and continued his studies with silversmiths William Frederick and Heikki Seppä. He has also occupied roles as artist-in-residence in the U.S state of Georgia, and lecturer in design methods at the National College of Art and Design, Dublin, where he taught students business and product development skills. He works from his studio in Durrow, County Offaly.

== Works ==
O'Dwyer's artwork is influenced by Irish prehistoric art, bronze-age artefacts, early monastic metalwork, and 20th century design and architecture. His childhood was divided between the monastic ruins of Tipperary and the skyscrapers of Manhattan.and this has influenced the way he approached the creation of artefacts or site-specific installations.

== Exhibitions ==
His works have been featured in public collections including the High Museum (US), Racine Art Museum (US), The Victoria and Albert Museum (UK), Ulster Museum (Belfast), Espace Paul Ricard (France), Governor's Palace (Belgium) and the National Museum of Ireland. He founded Sculpture in the Parklands, a land-art sculpture park in Lough Boora Parklands, County Offaly, in 2002.

== Gallery ==
Architectural Salt and Peppers

Candlestick Centrepiece

Teapot on the Crest of a Wave
