= Geevagh =

Geevagh An Ghaobhach
- Village
- Location in Ireland
- Coordinates: 54°05′57″N 8°15′02″W
- Country: Ireland
- Province: Connacht
- County: County Sligo
- Elevation: 90 m (300 ft)
- Time zone: UTC+0 (WET)
  - Summer (DST): UTC-1 (IST (WEST))
- Irish Grid Reference: G835168

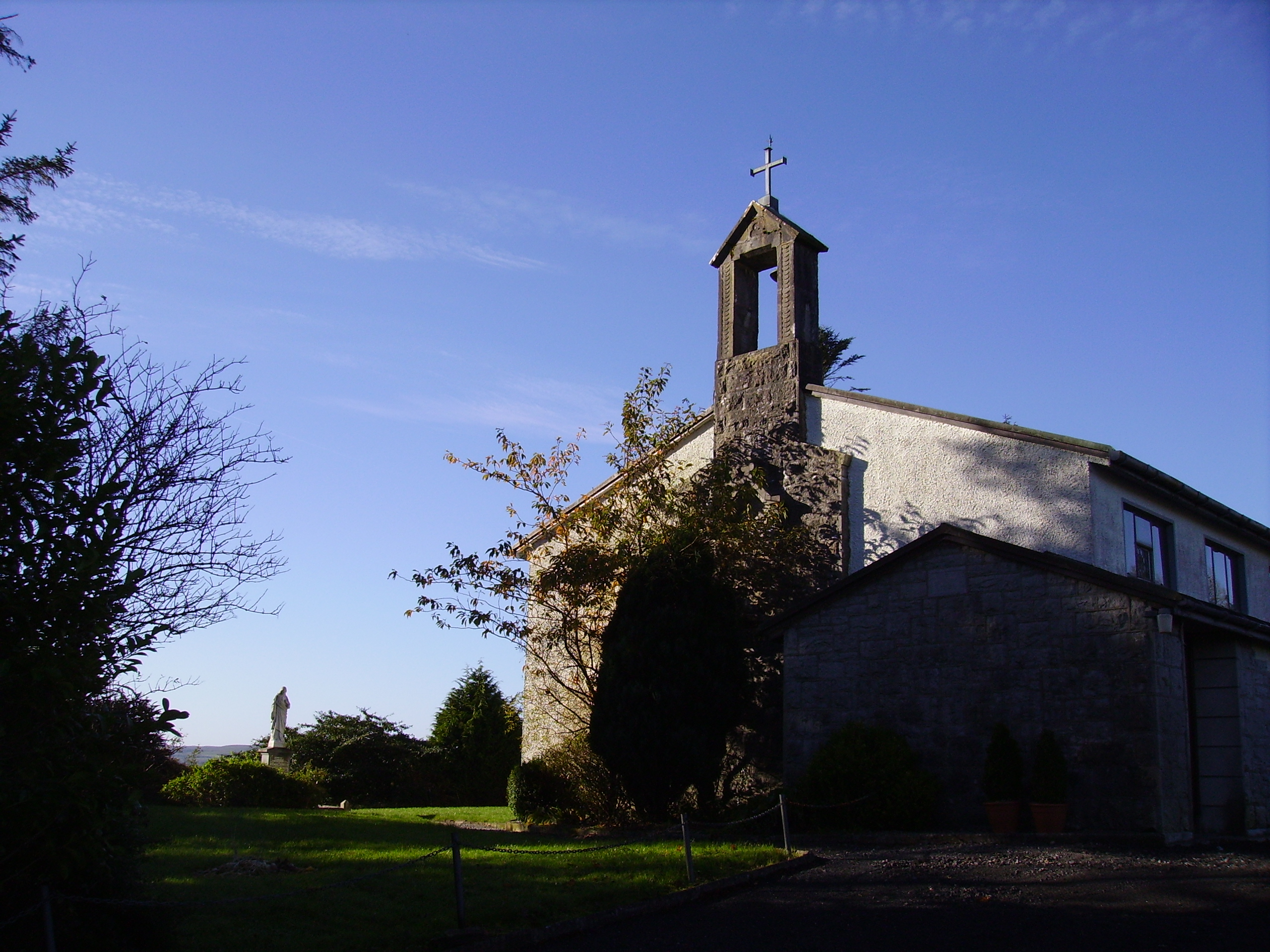
St Brigid's RC Church, Highwood, Geevagh

Geevagh (Irish: An Ghaobhach, meaning 'windy place') is a village in the south-east corner of County Sligo, Ireland, on the R284 regional road. The name, meaning "the windy (place)", describes a climatic feature of the village and its surrounding countryside. The name Geevagh also refers to the local Catholic parish, the boundaries of which are wider than those of the village itself.

== Geography ==
Geevagh and most of its surrounding parish lie wedged between Carrane Hill (458 m) to the north east and a series of drumlins to the south west, roughly 170 m in height. Two notable lakes lie encircled by these hills to the south west: Lough Bo (93 m) and Lough Nasool (109 m). Lough Nasool (Lake of the Eye) is unusual in that it has on several occasions drained away, and in the summer of 2006 it almost completely drained, diverted into underground channels.

Lying just beyond the southern borders of Geevagh lies a much larger lake: Lough Arrow. To the east lies the border with County Roscommon and to the north beyond Carrane Hill lies County Leitrim. To the west lies the village of Riverstown and most of County Sligo. The underlying rock structure is a combination of limestone, shale and sandstone, many examples of which can be seen in the local stone walls. A blanket bog covers the top of Carrane Hill and boggy land with poor quality soil is a feature of the local farms, the shallow soil being fertile enough to support only low density mixed farming of cattle and sheep. As a consequence of this, many local farmers supplement their meager income from farming with wages from jobs in the local big town of Sligo. One of the few local industries that supplied work to generations of men from the locality was the Arigna coal mines, located near the community of Glenkillamey to the north of Geevagh. This mine was in operation in one form or another since the 18th century and provided a low grade coal to a small power station operated by the ESB (Electricity Supply Board) since 1958. However the mine closed for the last time in 1990 hitting the local communities hard, particularly in the Arigna/Glenkillamey area. In keeping with its past involvement in power generation, 2005 saw the installation of six wind turbines at Carrownadargny. These electricity generating turbines are each capable of producing 0.85MW of power, and are manufactured by the Spanish company Gamesa. The towers on which the turbines stand are 44 metres high, with a combined blade diameter of 52 metres. The turbines can produce enough energy to save 13770 tonnes of CO_{2}.

== History ==
The headstone of Terence McDonough in Ballindoon Abbey

In common with much of County Sligo, there are many signs of ancient habitation in the locality, including cairns, megalithic tombs, and ring forts. Later signs of early Christian structures includes the ruins of a church attributed to Saint Patrick. Many of these old structures have spawned a rich story-telling tradition in the locality with many outlandish tales explaining their origins, such as the tale "Balor of the Evil Eye" being associated with the disappearance of Lough Nasool.

There is however evidence of many church ruins including in particular Ballindoon Abbey on the shores of Lough Arrow, a Dominican Priory from the early 16th century. It contains the grave of Terence McDonough, a member of the local clan that governed much of the area prior to the post-Cromwellian seizure of the land in the parish and its dispersal amongst English settler families such as King and Nicholson, and later its transfer to landlords such as Duke, Keogh and Whitney. Despite undoubted hardship, including sustained emigration, the community survived through resilience, finding sustenance in the family, the Roman Catholic church, the Gaelic Athletic Association, music and the local pubs, though not necessarily in that order.

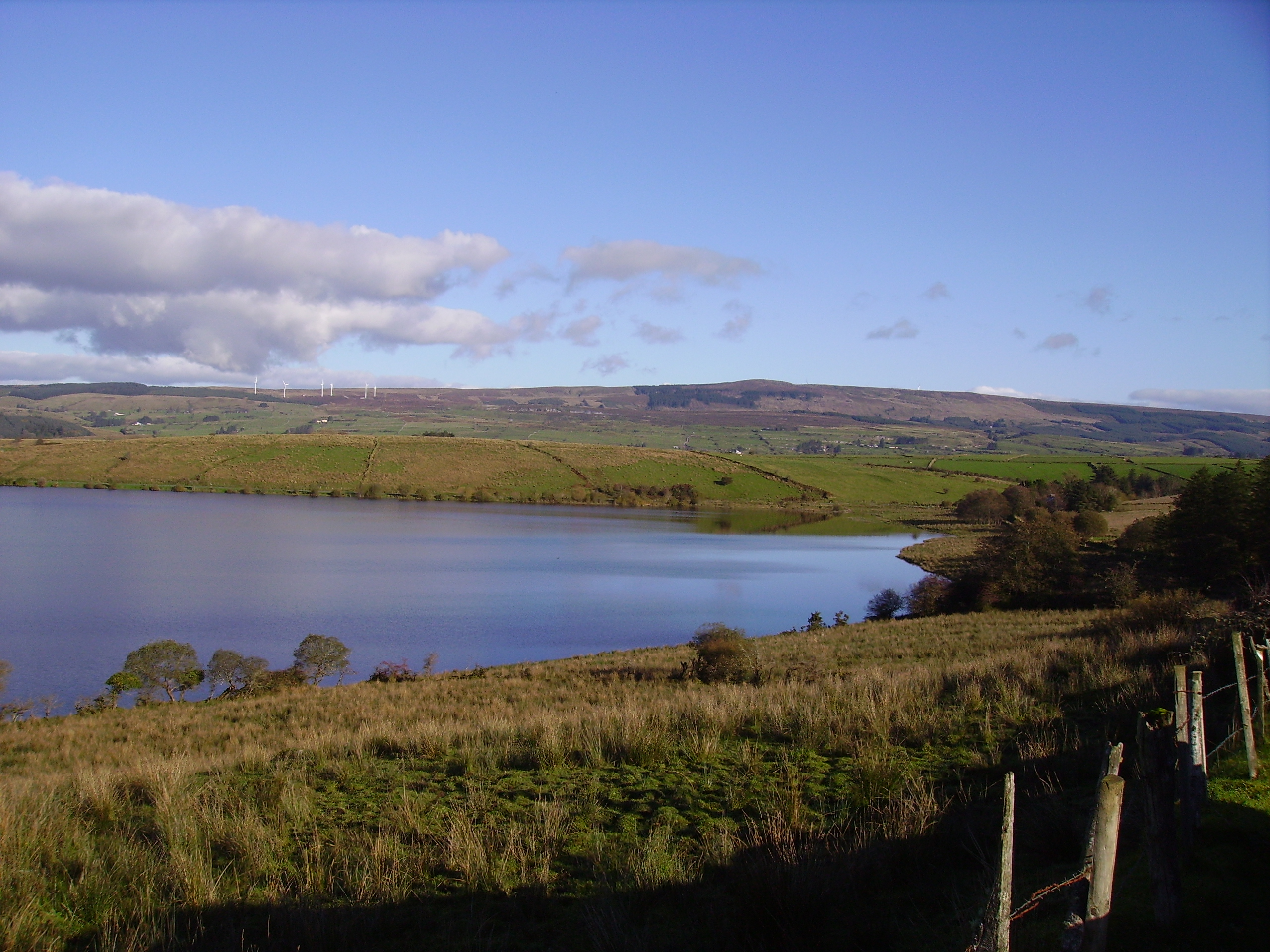
Geevagh: Carrane Hill with Lough Bo in the left foreground

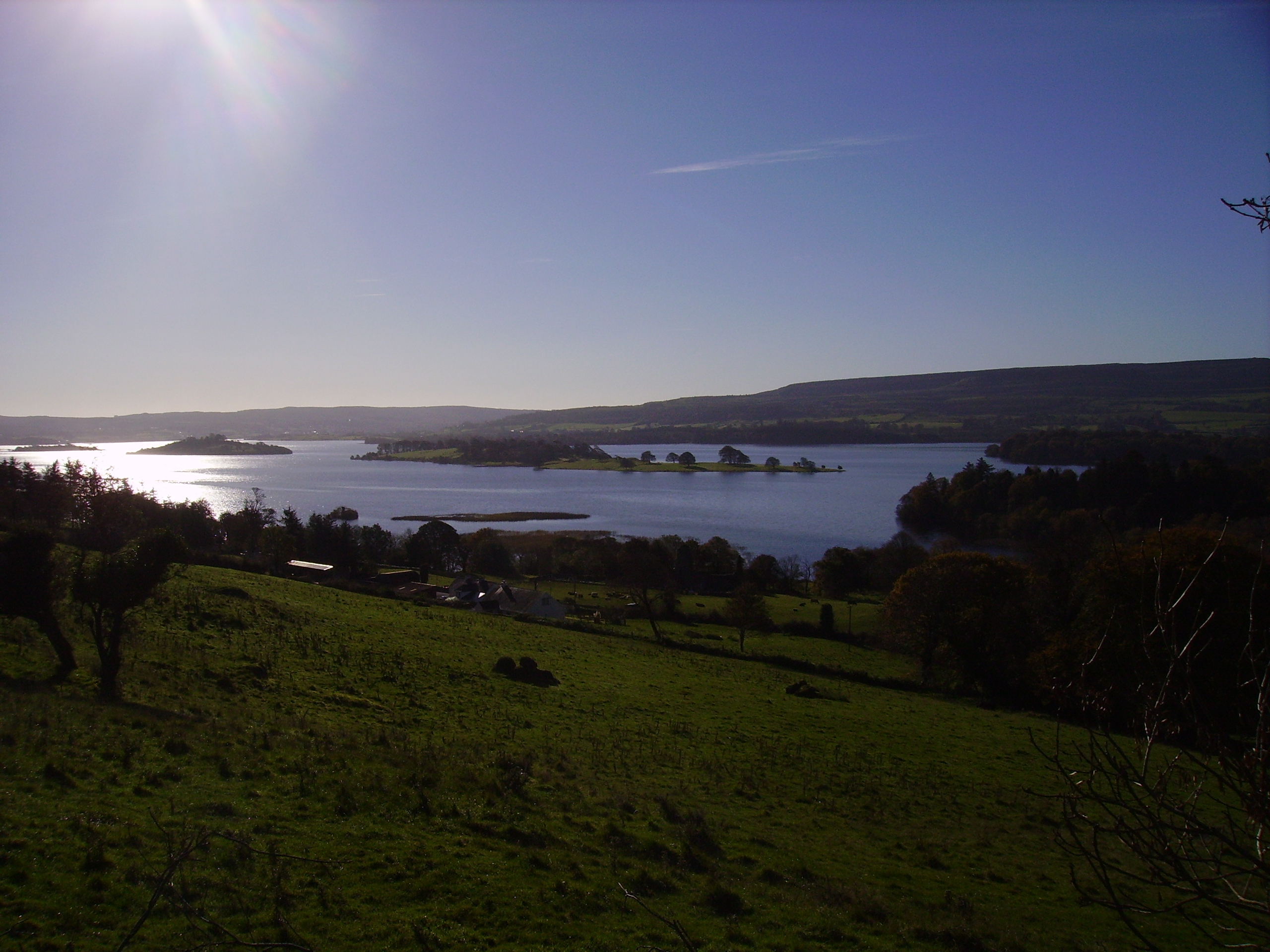
Lough Arrow with some of its many islands

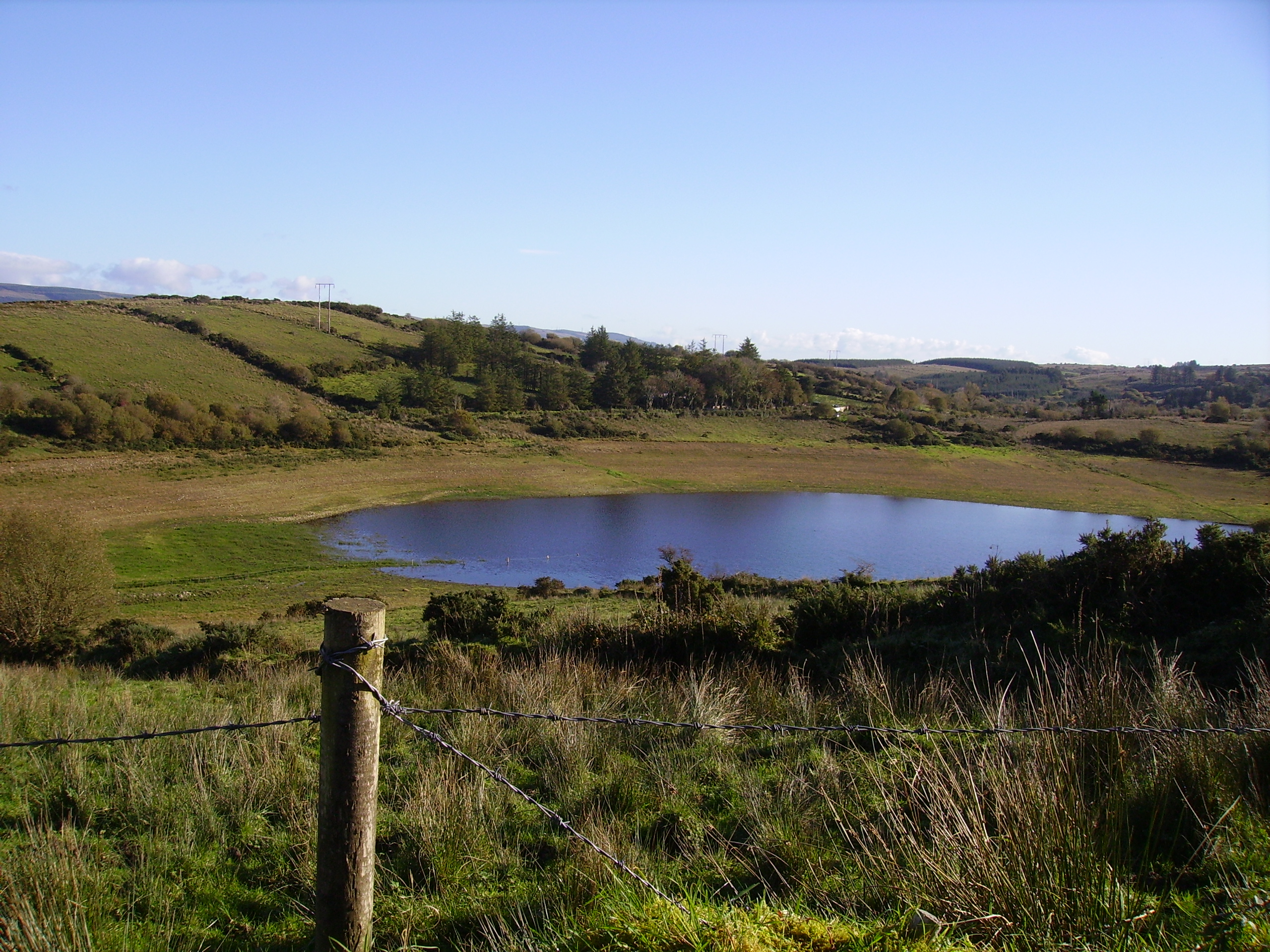
Lough Nasool, making a reappearance Nov 2006

2008 marked a centenary in the history of Geevagh. As of 1908, widespread evictions from the local Keogh estate meant many poor families eked out an existence of sorts on the rough barren slopes of Carrane Hill. A campaign of non-payment of rent exposed many families to such a fate, and in an effort to prevent further evictions, the Land League organised demonstrations to prevent delivery of eviction notices by local postmen, which led to several confrontations in January 1908 between a large number of citizens and the police. Court cases ensued against around two dozen locals, some of whom ended up serving hard labour in prison for up to six months. While the court cases and prison terms were ongoing, the local community rallied around the families of the prisoners, making sure their farms were worked and tilled. It was not until summer 1909 that a resolution came with the release of the last prisoners, to much local rejoicing by the parish as a whole. John C. Mc Ternan in his book Olde Sligo (1997) records the 1908 events in detail.

A new school was built in 2001, followed by several new building projects around Geevagh crossroads. However, in keeping with many other communities post the 2008 financial crisis, emigration became the only option for young people in a stagnant economy.

== Notable people ==
- Carmel Gunning, Traditional Irish musician
- Joe Costello, Former Labour TD for Dublin Central
- Eileen MacDonagh, Contemporary artist and sculptor
- Patrick J. McCarthy, Former Mayor of Providence, Rhode Island, USA in the mid-19th century

== See also ==
- List of towns and villages in Ireland
