= Eamon Bulfin =

Irish republican

- Born: 22 September 1892; Buenos Aires, Argentina
- Died: 24 December 1968 (aged 76); Meath Hospital, Dublin
- Other names: Éamonn Bulfin, Edmond Bulfin

Eamon Bulfin (also spelled Eamonn; 1892–1968) was an Argentine-born Irish republican. He was the son of writer William Bulfin (1864–1910) of Birr, in County Offaly (then called King's County). His father had emigrated to Argentina at the age of 20 and was a writer and journalist who became the editor/proprietor of The Southern Cross.

== Early life and family ==
Bulfin's first name is spelled with a double 'n' – Eamonn – in his marriage registration, death registration, and in the 1911 census, and is given in his signature on his Bureau of Military History witness statement and his military pension application.

Bulfin's mother, Annie O'Rourke, employed as a governess on the same estancia, crossed paths with his father, William Bulfin. As fellow Westmeath natives they found common ground and their relationship withstood distance when William left the gaucho lifestyle in the late 1880s to work at The Southern Cross newspaper in Buenos Aires. They tied the knot in approximately 1890 and established roots in Buenos Aires. Eamonn was born in 1892. Subsequently, they had four daughters named Catalina, Mary, Aileen, and Anita.

Bulfin studied at PH Pearse's school, Sgoil Éanna (in English, St Enda's), and at University College Dublin. One of headmaster Pearse's favourite pupils, he assisted with teaching after he graduated. He was recruited to the Irish Republican Brotherhood in 1913, and joined the Irish Volunteers, and along with some fellow St Enda's students created home-made bombs in the school's basement in preparation for the Easter Rising.

One of the flags raised by Bulfin during the Easter Rising of 1916.

In the Easter Rising of 1916, he served as an Irish Volunteers lieutenant in the GPO. Upon the arrival of the two flags, James Connolly requested that Bulfin raise the green flag bearing the words Irish Republic on the Prince's Street corner. The tricolour was then hoisted on the corner with Henry Street. Following the rising he was condemned to death, but was reprieved and deported to Buenos Aires after internment in Frongoch internment camp in Wales along with the other Irish soldiers of the Rising.

His sister Catalina (1901–1976) was secretary to Austin Stack. Catalina Bulfin married the Nobel Prize winner Seán MacBride, a founding member of Amnesty International, the son of Major John MacBride and Maud Gonne.

Bulfin married Nora Brick in 1927, and they had four children, one of them the sculptor Michael Bulfin.

== Career ==
Éamon de Valera made Bulfin Irish Representative to Argentina. De Valera described Bulfin's job as to "inaugurate direct trade between Ireland and the Argentine Republic… to co-ordinate Irish opinion in the Argentine, and to bring it into the Irish demand for a republic." While carrying out these duties, Bulfin maintained a close line of communication with Michael Collins in Ireland.

Bulfin was one of several representatives abroad appointed for that purpose during the War of Independence, and recognition of the importance of their work led to the establishment in February 1921 of a Department of Foreign Affairs.

In the 1920 County Council elections, Bulfin was nominated in his absence for a seat on the council of Offaly, his family's county of origin. He was elected and though he was in Argentina, immediately appointed chairman of the council. One of the first actions of the new council was to agree that King's County be renamed Offaly, from Uí Fáighle, the name of the ancient Gaelic kingdom from which part of the modern county was formed.

When Bulfin returned to Ireland during the Civil War he refused to take part in it - though he handed over £600 outstanding from the Argentine mission to the anti-Treaty forces. He was heartbroken by the death of Michael Collins during a gun battle in 1922.

In 1924, Bulfin joined the staff of The Southern Cross, becoming its London editor in 1933. From this post he wrote extensively on world politics and current affairs from a pro-Irish point of view. His columns focused on the causes of Irish independence and autonomy and even offered advice to other countries seeking self-determination. In addition to his political writings, he also published short stories and poetry in both English and Spanish.

On the formation of the Irish Free State, Bulfin returned to Ireland, and became a farmer, tax collector and one of those responsible for the administration of local old age pensions in Offaly.

== Later life, death and legacy ==
Bulfin worked at The Southern Cross newspaper until 1940 when he returned to Ireland due to ill health. During his time there, he made many contacts within the Argentine literary community who would later influence his work. After returning to Ireland he continued writing for publications including The Irish Press and Interim Magazine before retiring in 1954.

During his later years, Bulfin was hesitant to discuss his involvement in revolutionary activities. However, he participated in public events in Offaly commemorating the fiftieth anniversary of the Easter rising. Afterwards he retired from farming and relocated to 6 Smith's Cottages in Donnybrook, Dublin. Bulfin died on Christmas Eve 1968, and is buried in Eglish churchyard near Birr, Co Offaly. Bulfin Road in Inchicore, Dublin 8 is named after him. Bulfin Club de Deportes Gaélicos GAA Club in Buenos Aires was named in honour of the links shared between Ireland and Argentina, represented by the Bulfin family.

== See also ==
- Francis Bulfin
