= Eileen MacDonagh =

Irish sculptor (born 1956)

- Born: 20 July 1956 (age 69); Geevagh, County Sligo, Ireland
- Education: School of Art, Sligo; Limerick School of Art & Design
- Known for: Sculpture; Public Art; Stone sculpture International Sculpture Symposium
- Awards: Member of Aosdana since 2004

Eileen MacDonagh was born in Geevagh, County Sligo in 1956 and has worked as a sculptor since the 1980s. For her contribution to sculpture and the Arts in Ireland, MacDonagh was elected in 2004 to Aosdána, the Irish organisation that recognises artists that have contributed a unique body of work.

== Background ==
"Eileen MacDonagh's sculptures are candid, direct and ultimately rational. They spring from a harmonious and human-centred vision which seeks to charge natural materials with an aesthetic significance governed always by principles of clarity and formal coherence. Their major analogues derive from architecture and from craft... though never minimalist, the sculptures can sometimes be minimal, working to achieve a sort of meditative stillness where every details counts." —Medh Ruane.

MacDonagh's work has featured in many exhibitions, both in Ireland and abroad, including shows in Portugal, Scotland, India and Japan. Eileen has both organised and participated in the International Sculpture Symposium movement, in Ireland and abroad; her work is included in numerous collections, such as the Irish Office of Public Works (OPW), the Lough Boora Sculpture in the Parklands, County Offaly, Kilkenny and Cork County Councils, Marlay Park, Dublin and Tawara Newtown, Osaka, Japan.

MacDonagh works mainly in stone to produce large-scale sculptures. Due to the scale of her work, she has tended to concentrate on public art commissions although she has also exhibited in the context of the gallery exhibitions. She received a Diploma in Sculpture at the School of Art, Regional Technical College, Sligo, Ireland (1974–79) and an Art Teachers Certificate from the Limerick School of Art & Design (1979–80). MacDonagh's first solo exhibition in 1992,Truss, showed large-scale works made from both wood and stone. MacDonagh has continued through her career as a sculptor taking on large-scale projects and has built up a large body of public art since, across Ireland and in other countries.

Catherine Marshall, head of collections at Irish Museum of Modern Art, wrote in 2005 that:

"when MacDonagh talks about granite and limestone her language takes on a new dimension, introducing the listener to colour, texture, density and ultimately to the processes that working with them involve. 'Granite is the noblest of stones', she says, 'just the toughness of it. Every time you strike the stone you make fire. Granite is volcanic, it was born of fire and you need fire to form it.' She loves the challenge of working on a large scale, coaxing her vision out of unyielding, resistant stone. The circularity of the process, appeals to her sense of the invisible order that is a hall-mark of her work'."

MacDonagh is deeply influenced by books such as Robert Lawlor's Sacred Geometry and Fritjof Kapra's The Tao of Physics in which formal patterns are linked to ideas, religions and to the physical makeup of the universe. She has investigated the colour, texture and density of granite and limestone, as well as the challenge of working on a large scale. In recent years she has undertaken large-scale public works in stainless steel – The Medusa Tree (2009) for VISUAL, The Contemporary Art Centre, Carlow and – The Tallaght Cross (2008).

Many of MacDonagh's sculptures examine a fascination with geometry. She has long been inspired by the purity and ubiquity of geometric principles and the way in which geometric rules govern the universe. Her 2008 Fire from Stone show at the Centre Culturel Irlandais featured four major installations, the largest of which was composed of fifteen pieces of differing sizes. The individual pieces were based on icosahedral forms, a complex geometric shape, and were carved from over ten different types of Indian granite. They ranged in size from 4 feet in diameter to just 4 inches, and were all created when MacDonagh was on a residency in India.

== Career ==
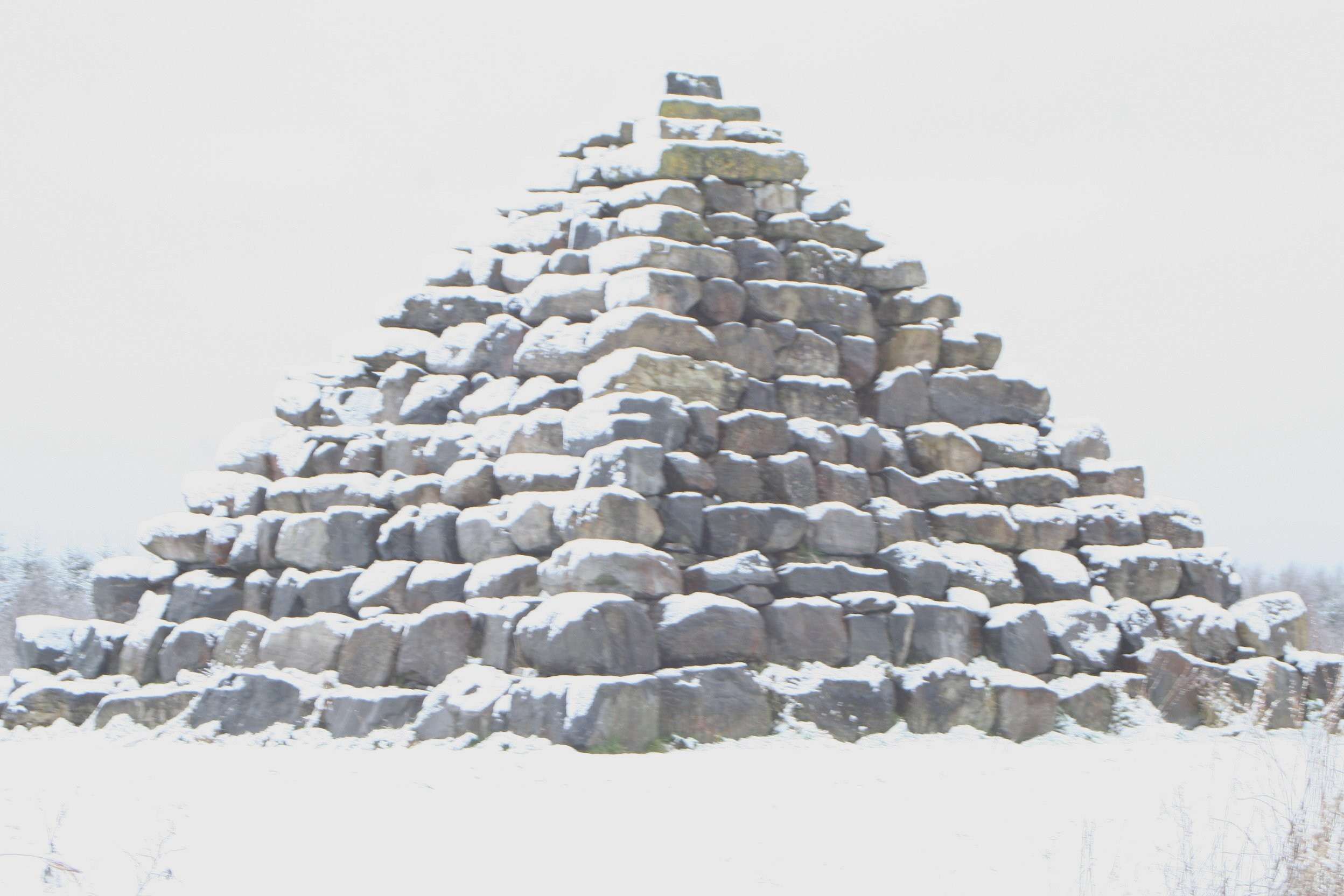
Snow on sculpture Boora Pyramid (2002) by Eileen MacDonagh at Sculpture in the Parklands in Ireland.

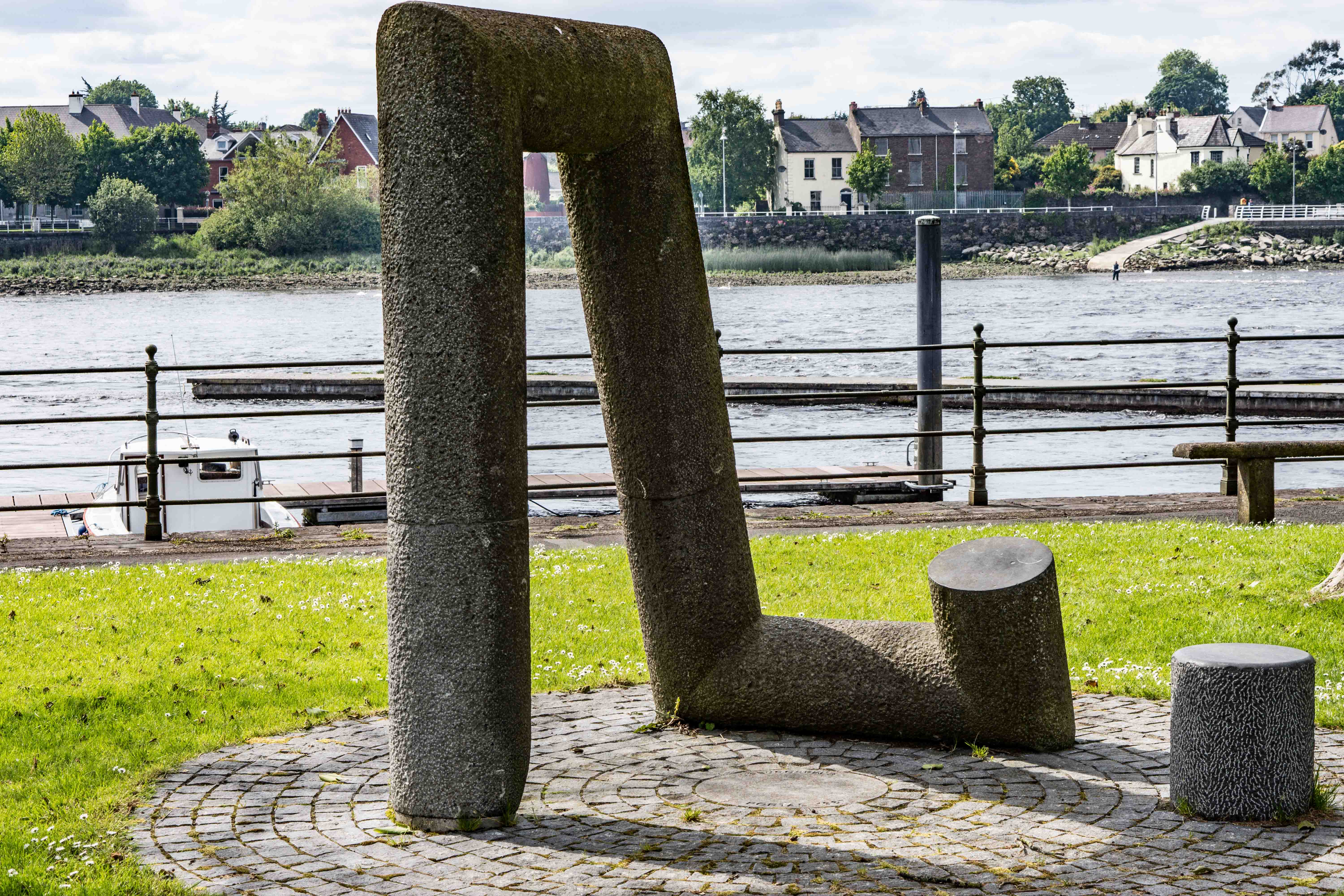
Poised Portal by Eileen McDonagh at Custom House Quay, Limerick

In February 2012 MacDonagh will be showcasing new original works alongside past works in a Retrospective Exhibition of her work at VISUAL, the Centre for Contemporary Art, Carlow, Ireland. The show is called Lithosphere, opening on 5 Feb 2012 at 3 pm. This exhibition will be open on public display for 3 months

=== Awards and public art commissions ===
- 2009 The Medusa Tree Commission VISUAL, the Centre for Contemporary Art, Carlow, Ireland
- 2008 Commission, Tallaght Cross, Dublin, Ireland
- 2006 Commission, Inst. Technology, Tralee, County Kerry, Ireland
- 2006 Commission, Innis Oirr, The Aran Islands, County Galway, Ireland
- 2005 Comm. National Maritime College, Ringaskiddy, County Cork, Ireland
- 2004 Commission, Dromahair/Leitrim, Ireland
- 2004 Elected as a member of Aosdana
- 2001 Commission, The Pyramid, Lough Boora, County Offaly, Ireland
- 2001 Commission, Kildavin, County Carlow, Ireland
- 2000 Commission, John Roberts Square, St, Waterford, Ireland
- 2000 Commission, Millennium Fountain, Boyle, County Roscommon, Ireland
- 1999 Commission, Market Square, Tullamore, County Offaly, Ireland
- 1998 Commission, Famine Stone, Eigse, Carlow, Ireland
- 1997 Commission, Carrigtwohill, County Cork, Ireland
- 1997 Commission, Dunlaoighre, County Dublin, Ireland
- 1996 Commission, Kilkenny City, Ireland
- 1995 Commission, Portlaoise, County Laois, Ireland
- 1994 Commission, Mallow Road, Cork, Ireland
- 1992 Commission, Dublin Corporation, Clanbrassil St., Dublin, Ireland
- 1991 Commission, Regional Technical College, Athlone, Ireland
- 1990+95 First Prize Sculpture, Iontas Exhibition, Sligo, Ireland
- 1989 Commission, Dublin Castle, Ireland

=== Key solo exhibitions ===
- 2008 Fire from Stone, Centre Culturel Irlandais, Paris
- 2005 From Another Constellation, Model and Niland Gallery, Sligo, Ireland
- 1992–1993 Truss Touring Exhibition Projects Arts Centre, Limerick City Art Gallery, Irelan

=== Collections ===
The following organisations have collections of MacDonagh's Public Art Sculpture work

Ireland

- Waterford Co. Council
- Carlow Co. Council
- Dun Laoghaire / Rathdown Co. Council
- Kilkenny Co. Council
- Cork Co. Council
- Mountmellick Library, County Laois
- Museum Park, Kiltimagh, County Mayo
- Harbour Board, Aberdeen, Scotland
- VEC County Sligo
- Letterfrack Centre, County Galway
- Dublin City Corporation, County Dublin
- Limerick City Corporation, County Limerick
- St. Patrick's Training College, Dublin
- OPW Dublin Castle
- Marley Park, Dublin
- Cork County Council

International

- Sendai : Peoples Park, Japan
- Tawara : Newtown, Osaka, Japan
- Regional : Technical College, Athlone
- Merzig, : Stones on the Border, Germany
- Gulbarga : India.

== Sources ==
- Lane, Ann. 2010. By the Way – a selection of Public Art in Ireland, ISBN 978-1-905569-44-1, pp. 14, 64, 66, 122, 131, 168, 170, 173, 234, 282.
- Dunne, Aidan. 2008. Rare encounter with sculpture in the spotlight. Irish Times, 6 Feb.
- Kenny, Padraig. 2008. The French Connection. Sunday Tribune, 28 Sep p3.
- Dunne, Aidan, 2005. The Art of Geometry. Irish Times, 23 May, p. 10.
- Woods, Suzanne and Marshall, Catherine. 2005. Eileen MacDonagh: Another Constellation. Model Arts and Niland Gallery, Sligo, Ireland ISBN 0-9540352-9-1. 24 pp.
- Anon. 2002. A Pyramid for Boora. Tribune, 21 Sep
- "A Landscape in Stone", Interview by Peter Murray, Irish Arts Review Volume 20, Number 2, Summer 2003. Retrieved 28 Jan 2010.
- Dunne, Aidan. 1992. Triumph of a Sculptural Purist. Sunday Tribune, 19 July.
- Anon. Dubliner's Diary, 10 July 1992.
- Anon. City Entertainer, Jul 1992.
- Project Press. 1992. Truss Project Arts Centre Ltd, Dublin, 32 pp. Essay by Medb Ruane. ISBN No. 1 872493 05 X.
- Sendai sculpture symposium catalogue, JAPAN, 1989.
- Die Spur Symposium, Lindabrunn, Austria.
- Sculpture Society Ireland. 1988. Meitheal Sculpture Symposium, Dublin.
- Collaboration, 1988. The Pillar Project, Dublin.
