= Miesian Plaza =

Office development in Dublin, Ireland

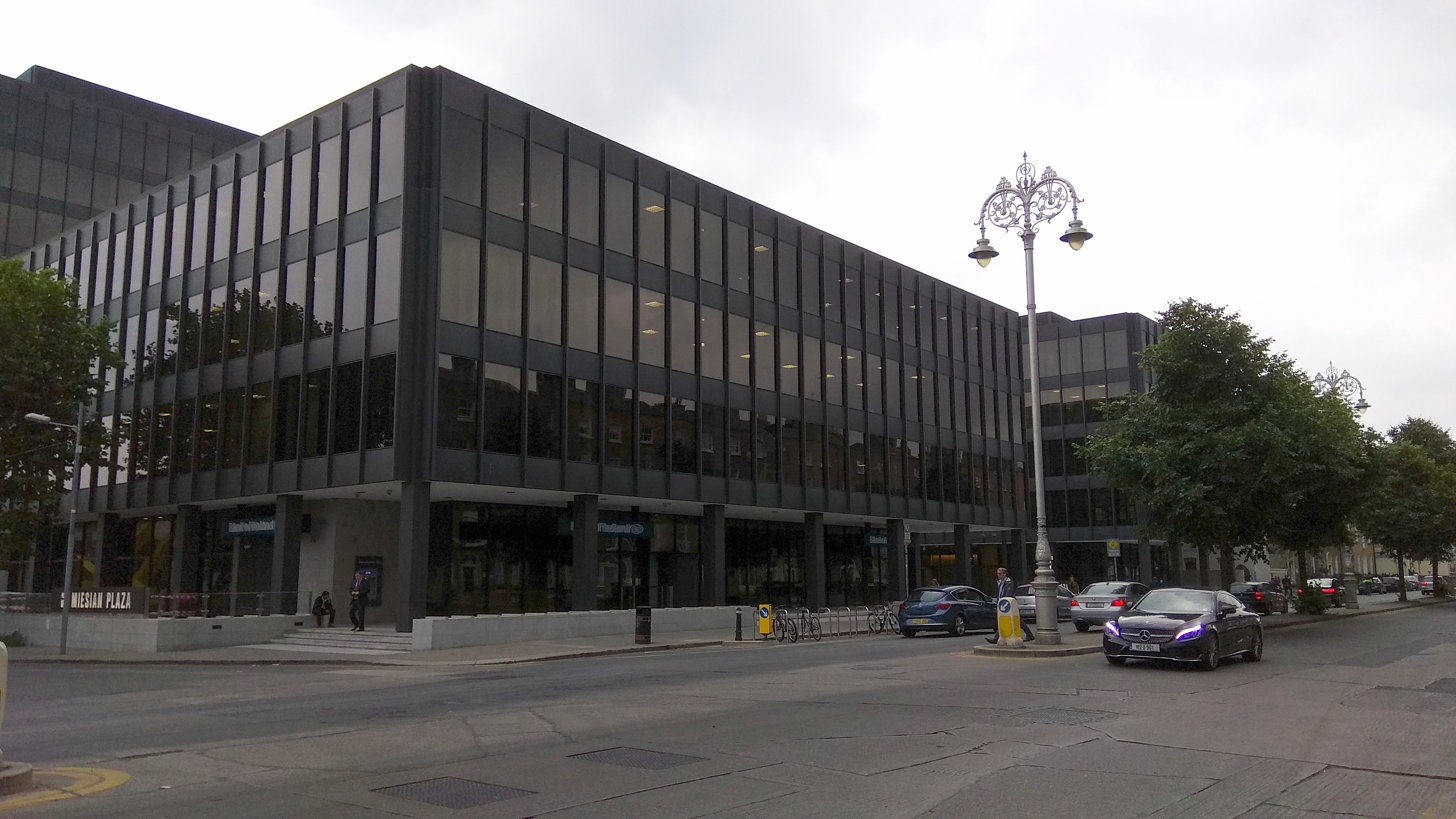
- Miesian Plaza in 2018

General information
- Status: Completed
- Type: Office
- Architectural style: International Style, Modernist
- Address: 50-58 Lower Baggot Street, Dublin 2
- Town or city: Dublin
- Country: Ireland
- Completed: 1968-1978
- Owner: Larry Goodman

Technical details
- Floor count: 8
- Floor area: 20,493 square metres (220,600 sq ft)

Design and construction
- Architect(s): Ronald Tallon (Scott Tallon Walker)
- Main contractor: G&T Crampton

Miesian Plaza (formerly known as the Bank of Ireland Headquarters) is an office building complex on Lower Baggot Street, Dublin. It is designed in the International Style by Scott Tallon Walker and inspired by the architect Ludwig Mies van der Rohe, particularly his Seagram Building. One of Scott Tallon Walker's founders, Robin Walker, had studied under and taught with Mies, though the building was chiefly designed by partner Ronnie Tallon. Dublin City Council described it as "one of the most important Modernist buildings in Ireland" and "Dublin’s finest example of the restrained and elegant Miesian style", and its facade and plaza are protected structures.

== History ==
The complex was built as the Bank of Ireland's headquarters, and it was known by that name for most of its history. Construction was controversial as it entailed the demolition of a block of Georgian homes. The project was said to have used so much bronze, £1.25 million worth of Delta manganese bronze, that the global price of bronze was impacted. The building was completed in 1972 and was the largest bronze-walled building in Europe. Costing a total of £4.6 million, it was the most expensive office development built in Ireland at the time.

The Bank of Ireland sold the property in 2006 at the height of the Celtic Tiger property boom and moved its headquarters from the building in 2010. An extensive redevelopment and expansion was proposed in 2008 but rejected by Dublin City Council due to the impacts on its protected architecture and surrounding area.

The complex was purchased by Larry Goodman in 2012 and extensive renovations were carried out under the original architects Scott Tallon Walker, respecting the complex's iconic design. Following the renovations carried out by John Paul Construction, the complex was renamed Miesian Plaza, and in 2019 became the first development in Ireland to achieve LEED Platinum v4 certification.

== Design ==
Miesian Plaza includes three buildings of four, five, and eight storeys in height, with a central plaza. The two shorter buildings are adjacent to Lower Baggot Street with the 8-story building behind them, minimising its towering effect on the street.

The plaza contains the sculptures Reflections by Michael Bulfin and Red Cardinal by John Burke.

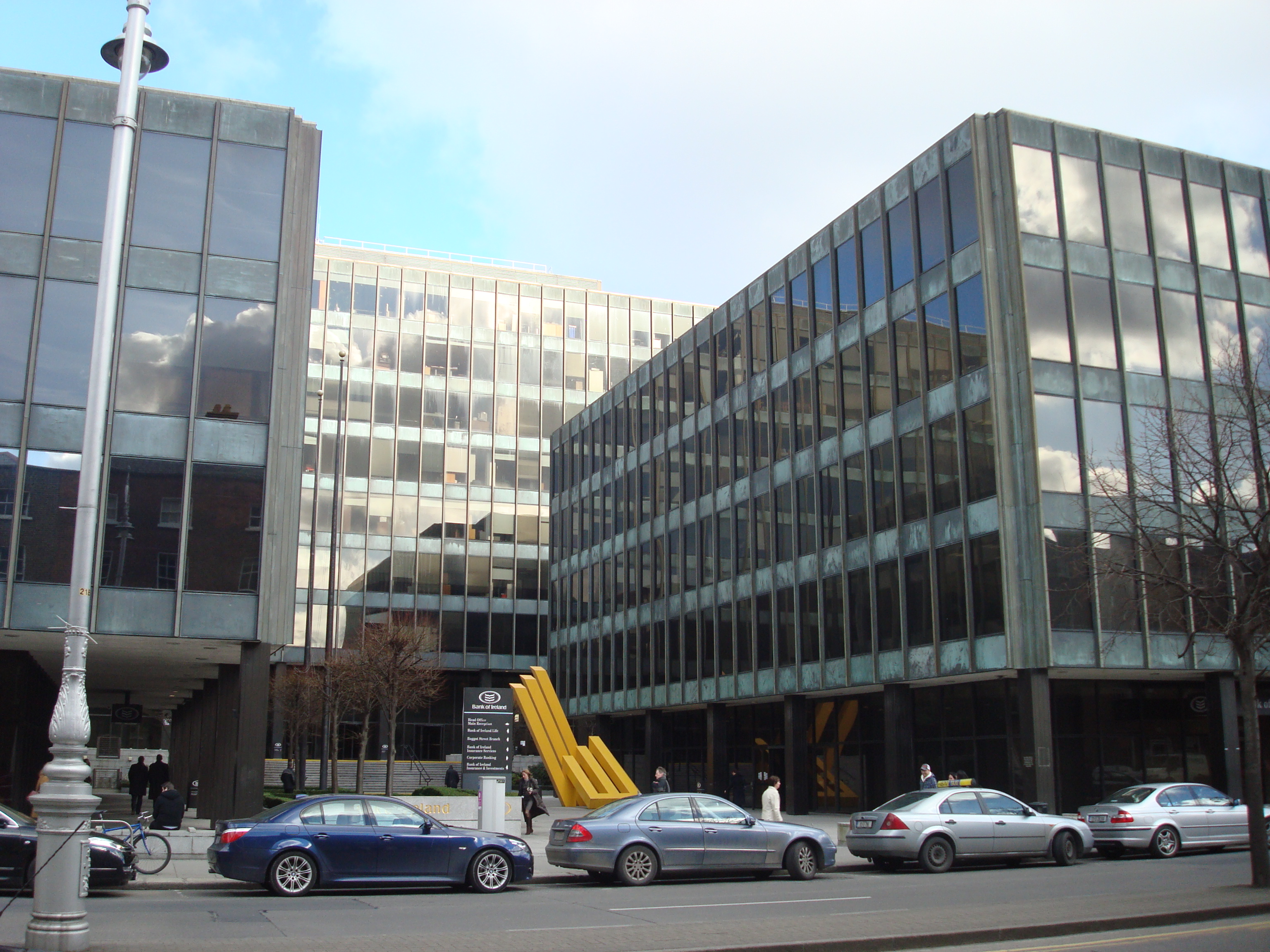
The Bank of Ireland Headquarters in 2010. The cladding shows patina prior to its mid-2010s refurbishment.

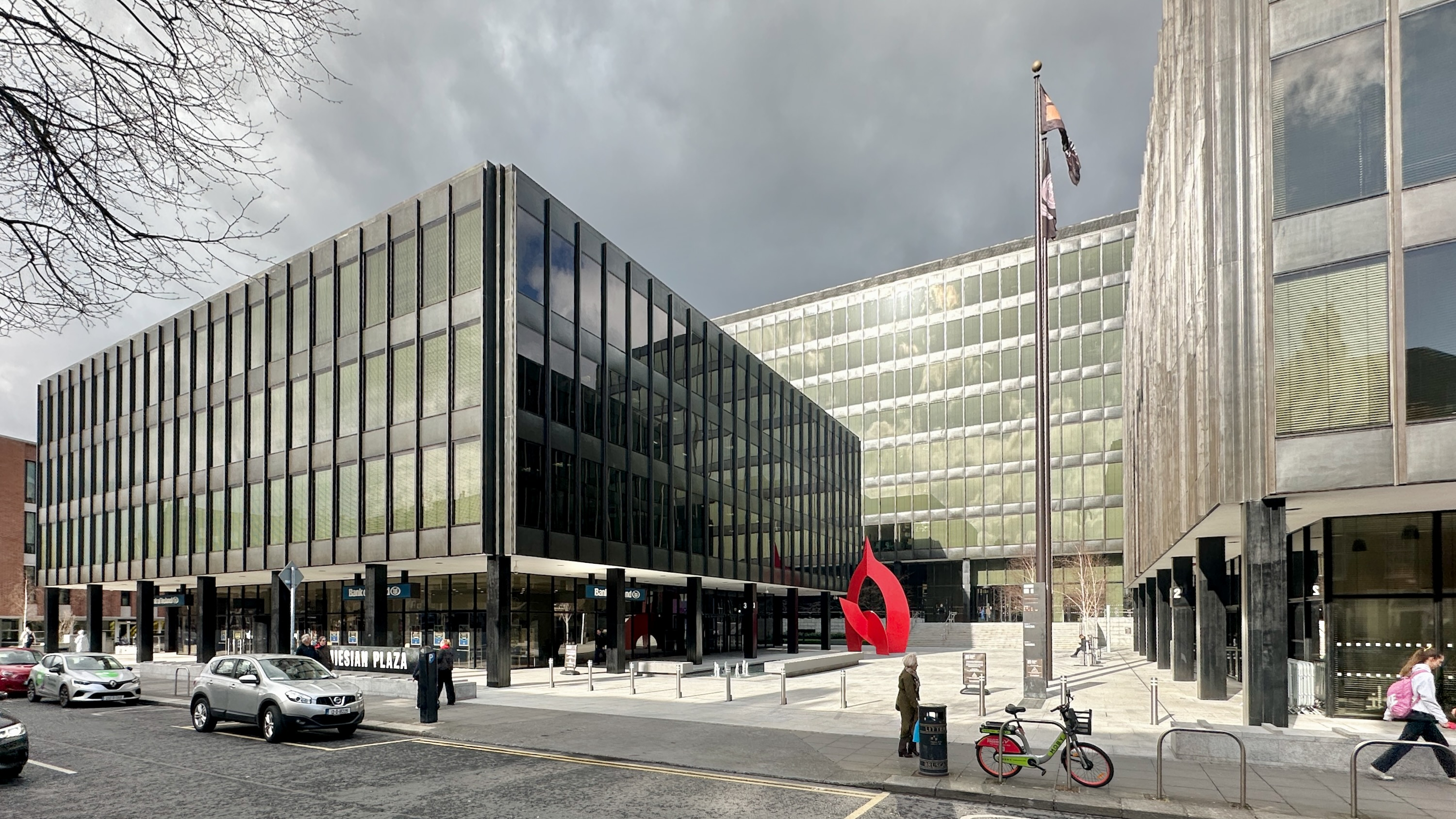
Miesian Plaza, the former Bank of Ireland in 2025.

The complex's facade and plaza were listed as protected structures in 2010. The facade is identical to that on Mies van der Rohe's Seagram Building.

== Tenants ==
The complex was the Bank of Ireland's headquarters from 1972 to 2010.

Miesian Plaza is the headquarters of pharmaceutical company Shire (since 2017) and of Ireland's departments of Children, Disability and Equality and of Health (both since 2018).
