= Sculpture in the Parklands =

Coordinates: 53.225°N 7.729°W

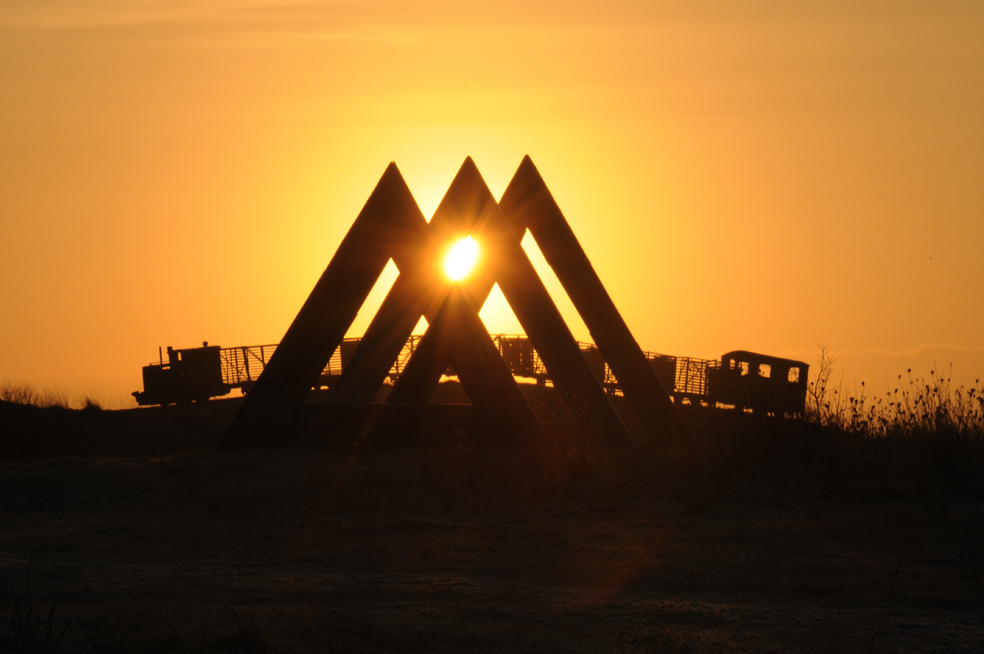
60 Degrees by Kevin O'Dwyer and Sky Train by Mike Bulfin

The Sculpture in the Parklands is a 50-acre (200,000 m^{2}) land and environmental sculpture park located in Lough Boora, County Offaly, Ireland. The park is open to the public 365 days of the year and admission is free. Sculpture in the Parklands was founded by sculptor Kevin O'Dwyer in partnership with Bord na Mona, Lough Boora Parklands Group, Offaly County Council and the Arts Council.

== Site ==
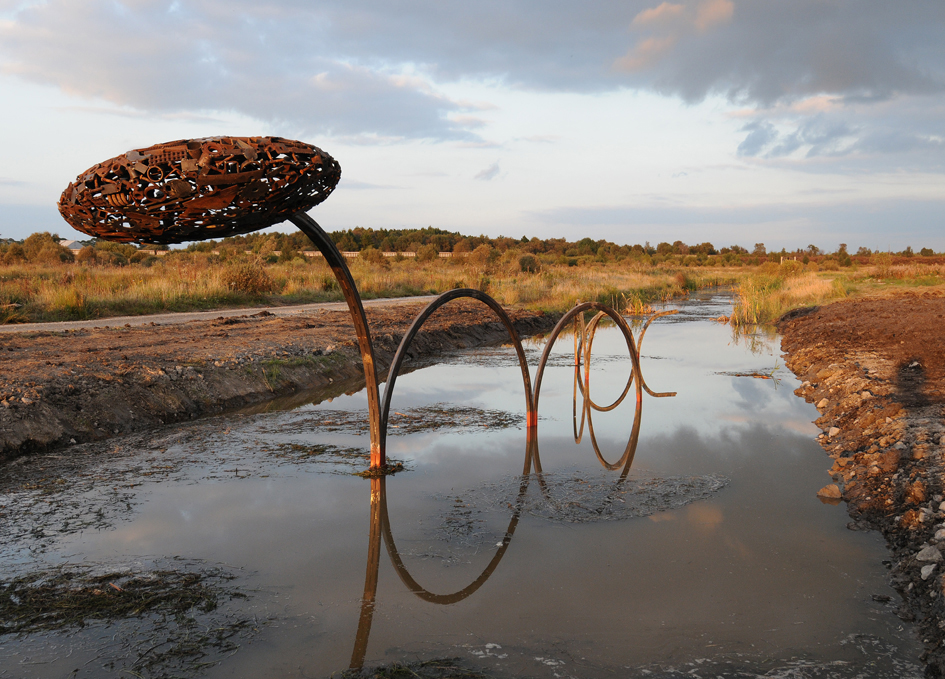
System no. 30 by Julian Wild

In the wetlands and wildlife wilderness of Lough Boora, inspired by the rich natural and industrial legacy of the boglands, the artists have created a series of large-scale sculptures that are now part of the Parklands' permanent collection. Sculpture in the Parklands began as an international sculpture symposium in 2002 when seven Irish and international artist created works of art over a three-week residency. The success of the symposium led to the formation of Sculpture in the Parklands and eight site-specific sculptures created during the symposium form the nucleus of the project. Currently there are 20 site-specific sculptures in the Parklands.

== Mission ==
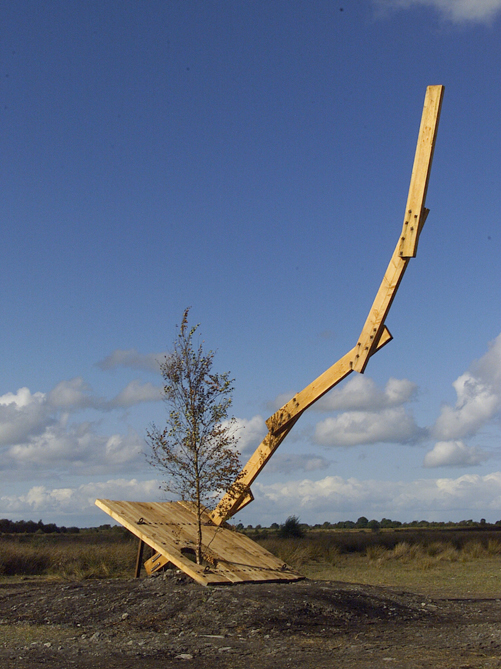
A Tree in a Sculpture by Naomi Seki

Inviting artists to create significant site-specific works of art during the artist in residency programme each year, the mission of Sculpture in the Parklands is to inspire artists to create artworks in response to the unique landscape and industrial heritage of the cut away bogland and to build awareness of the arts within the community through public participation and interaction. In addition to permanent sculpture and time-based work, the project has a commitment to commissioning video artists, composers, choreographers, and performance artists to interpret and document this unique landscape, folklore and industrial history.

== Gallery ==
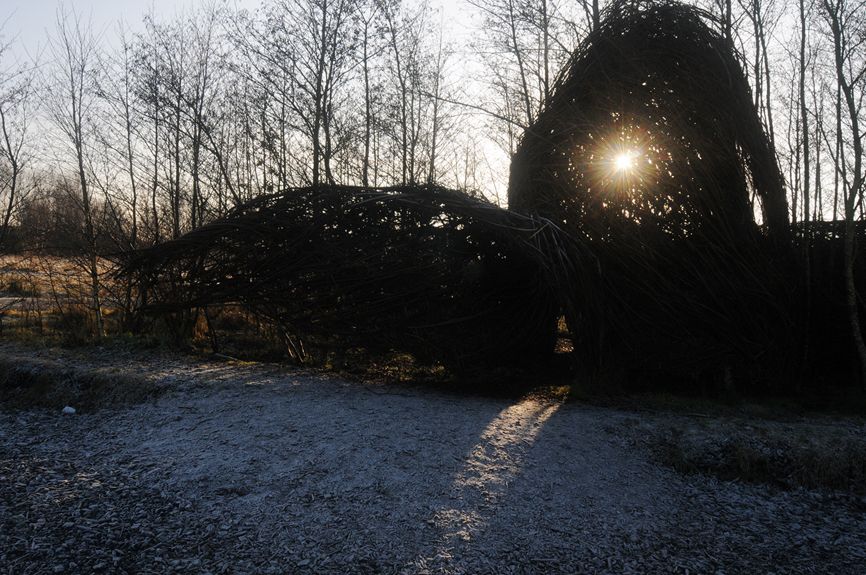
Sunrise at Ruaille Buaille by Patrick Dougherty

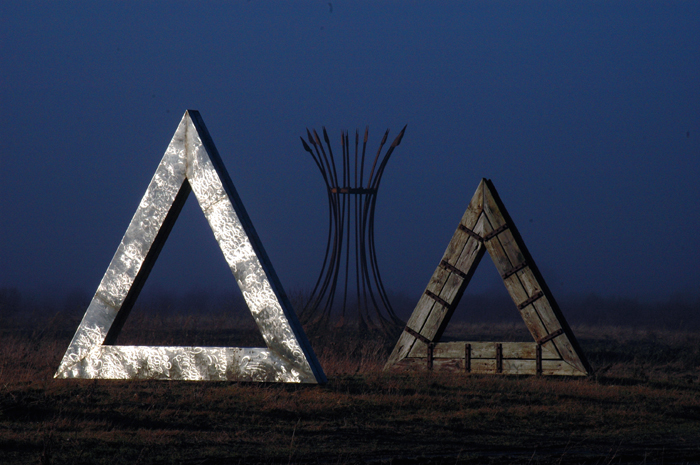
60 Degrees and Cycles by Caroline Madden

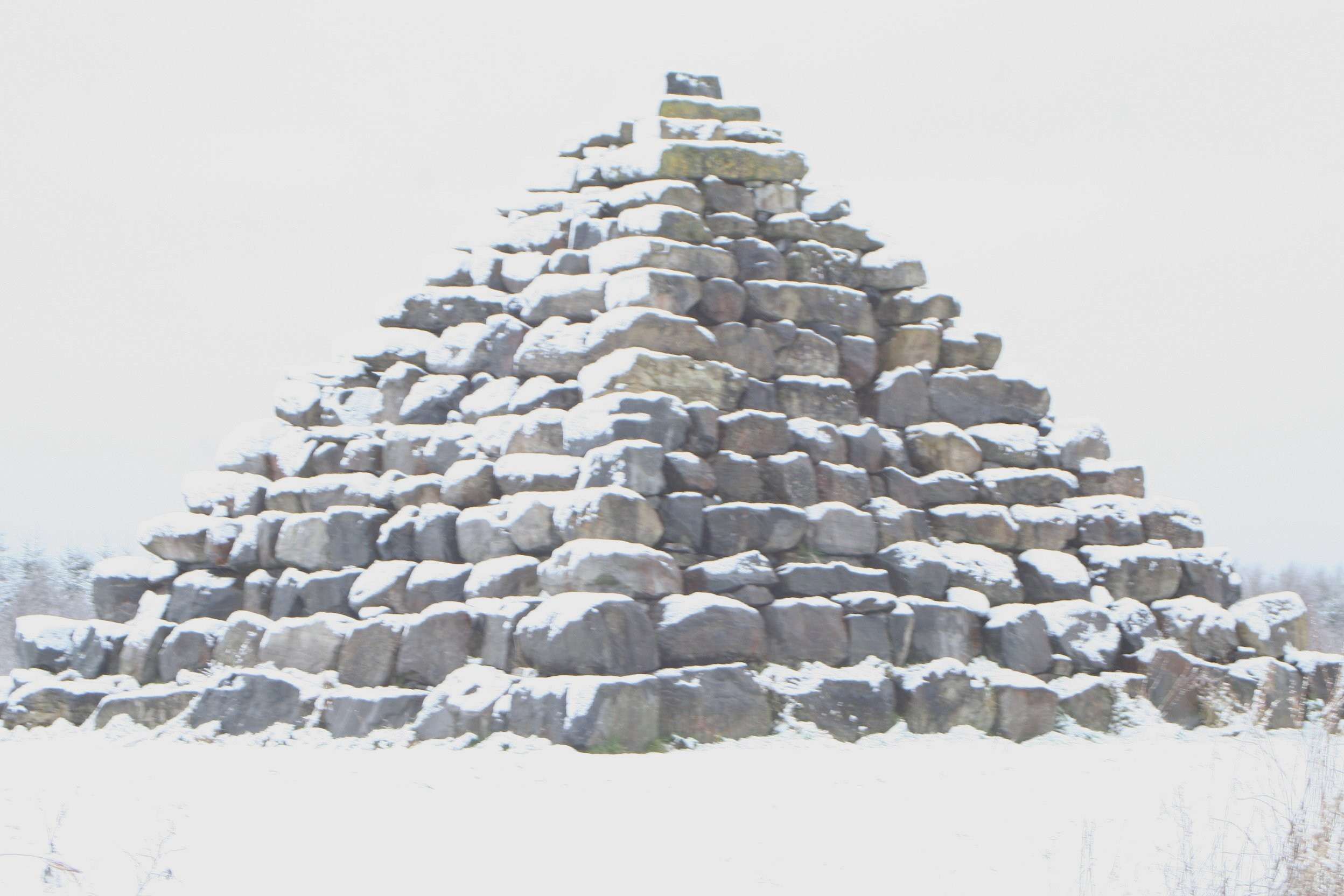
Boora Pyramid by Eileen MacDonagh

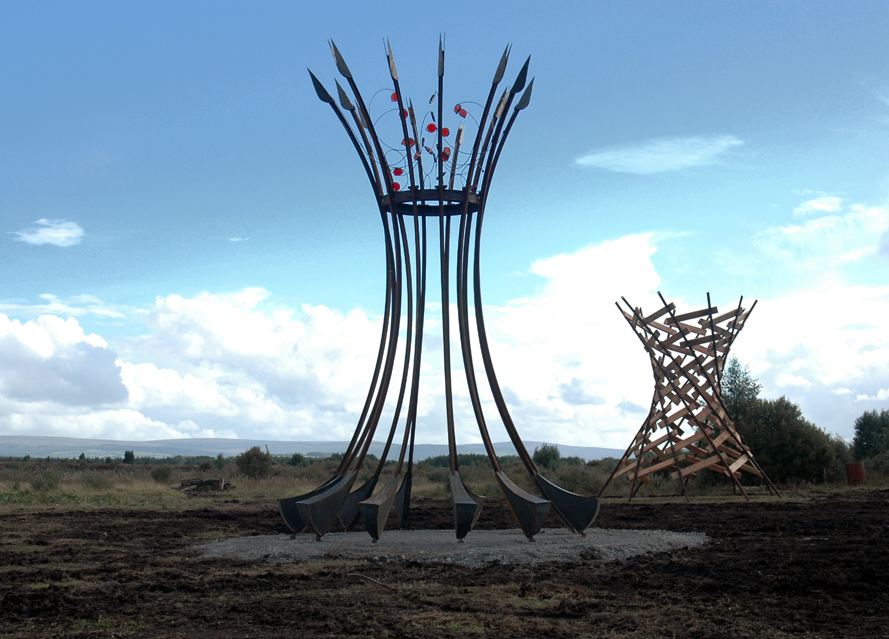
Cycles by Caroline Madden and Boora Convergence by David Kinane

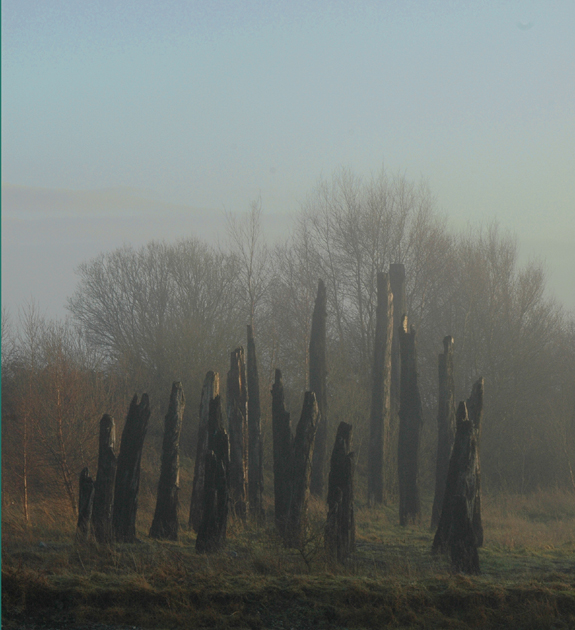
Bog Track by Johan Seitzema

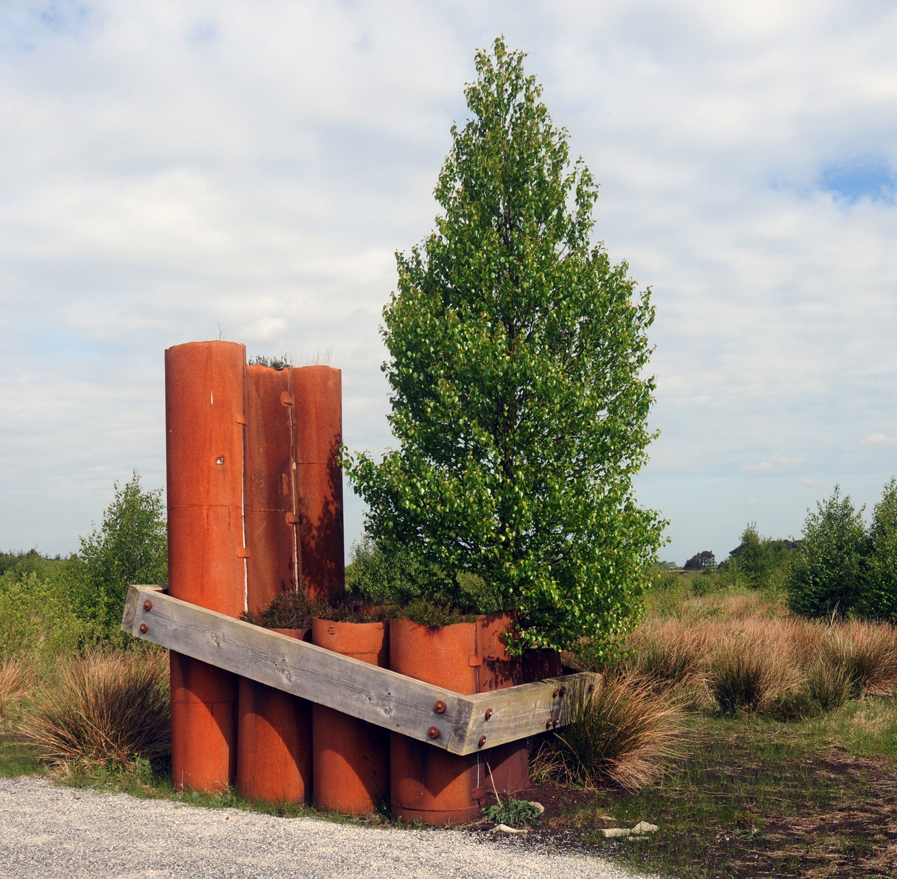
Boora Stacks by Naomi Seki

Passage by Alan Counihan

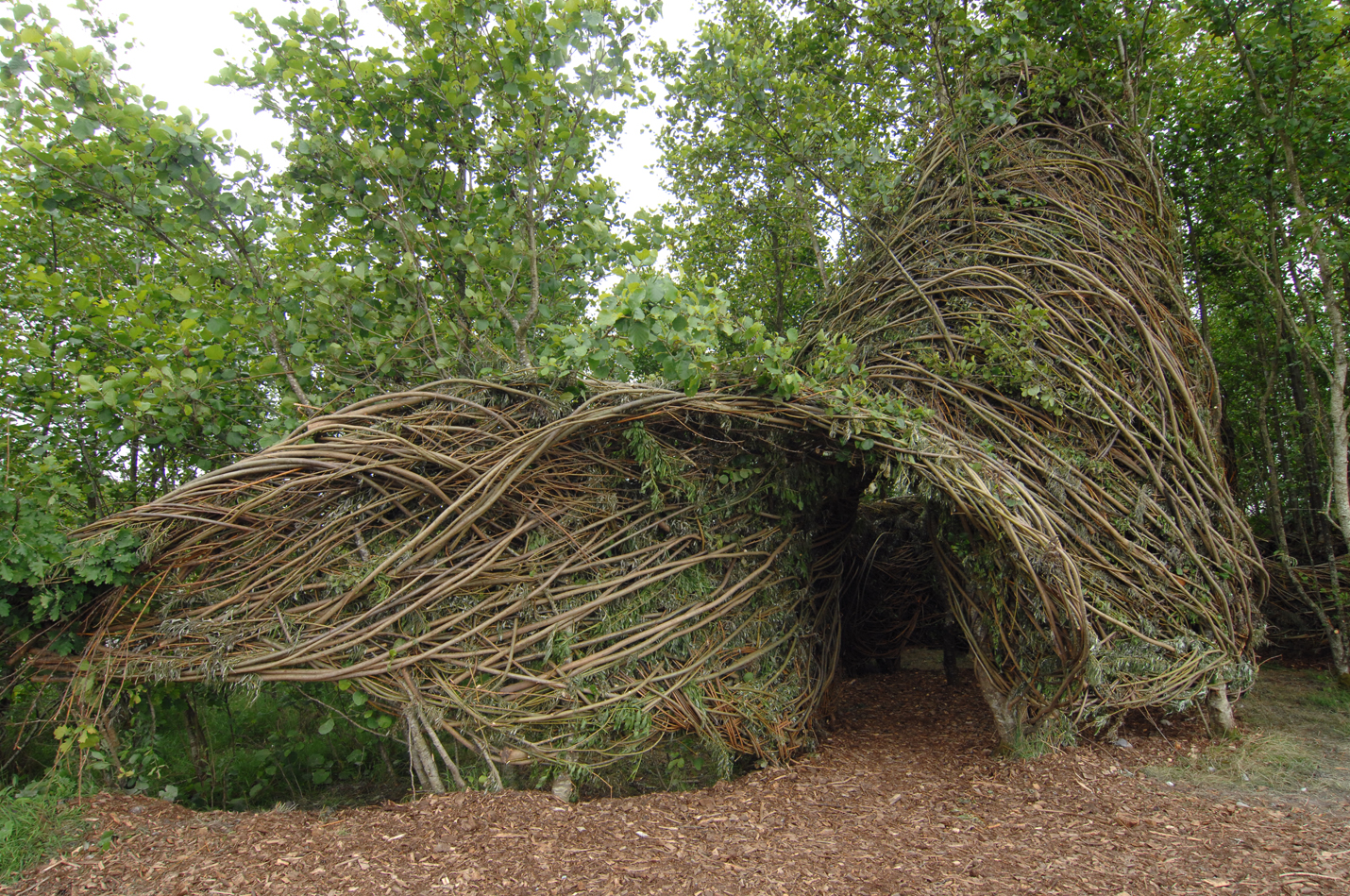
Ruaille Buaille by Patrick Dougherty

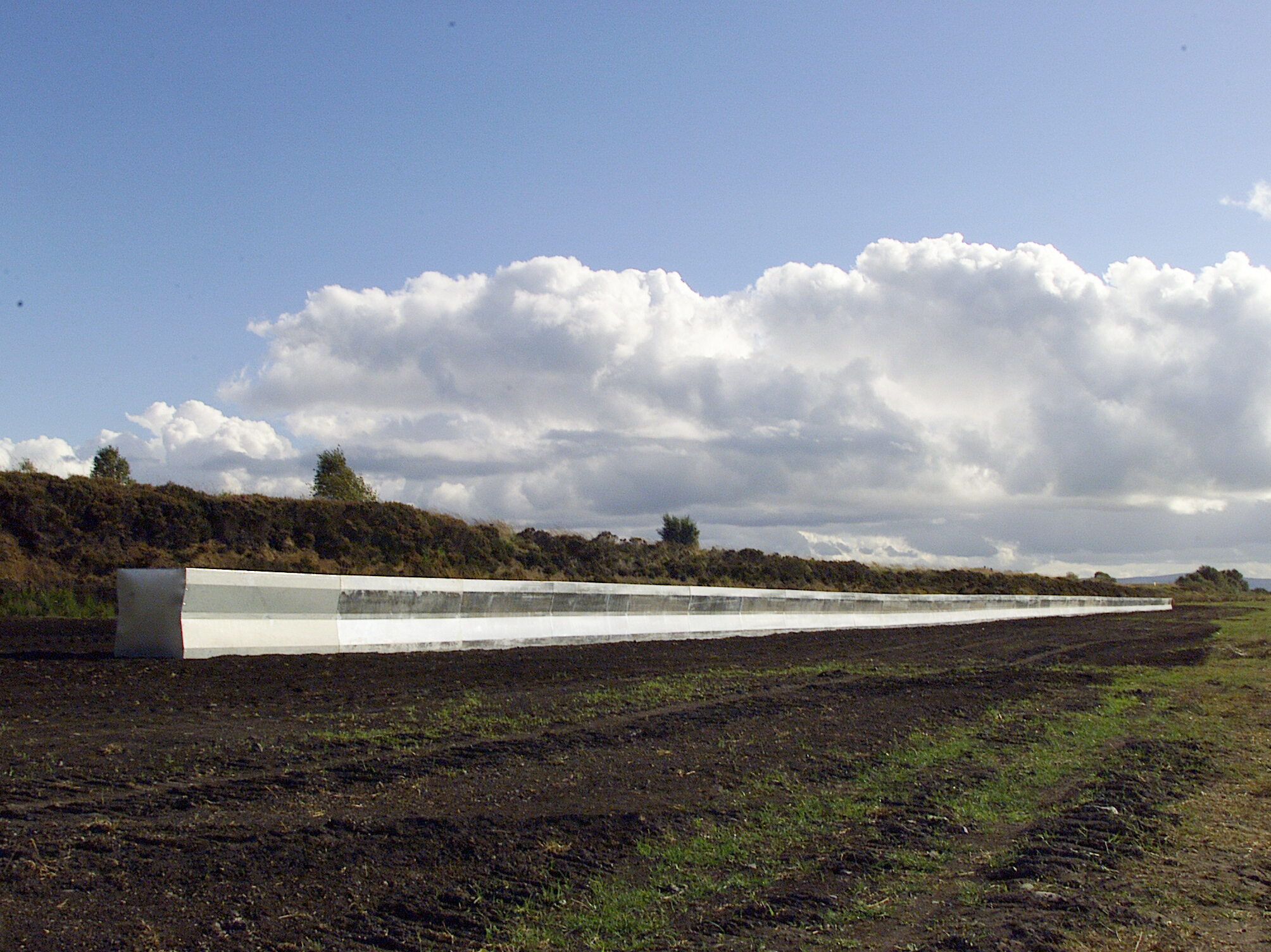
Raised Line by Maurice McDonagh

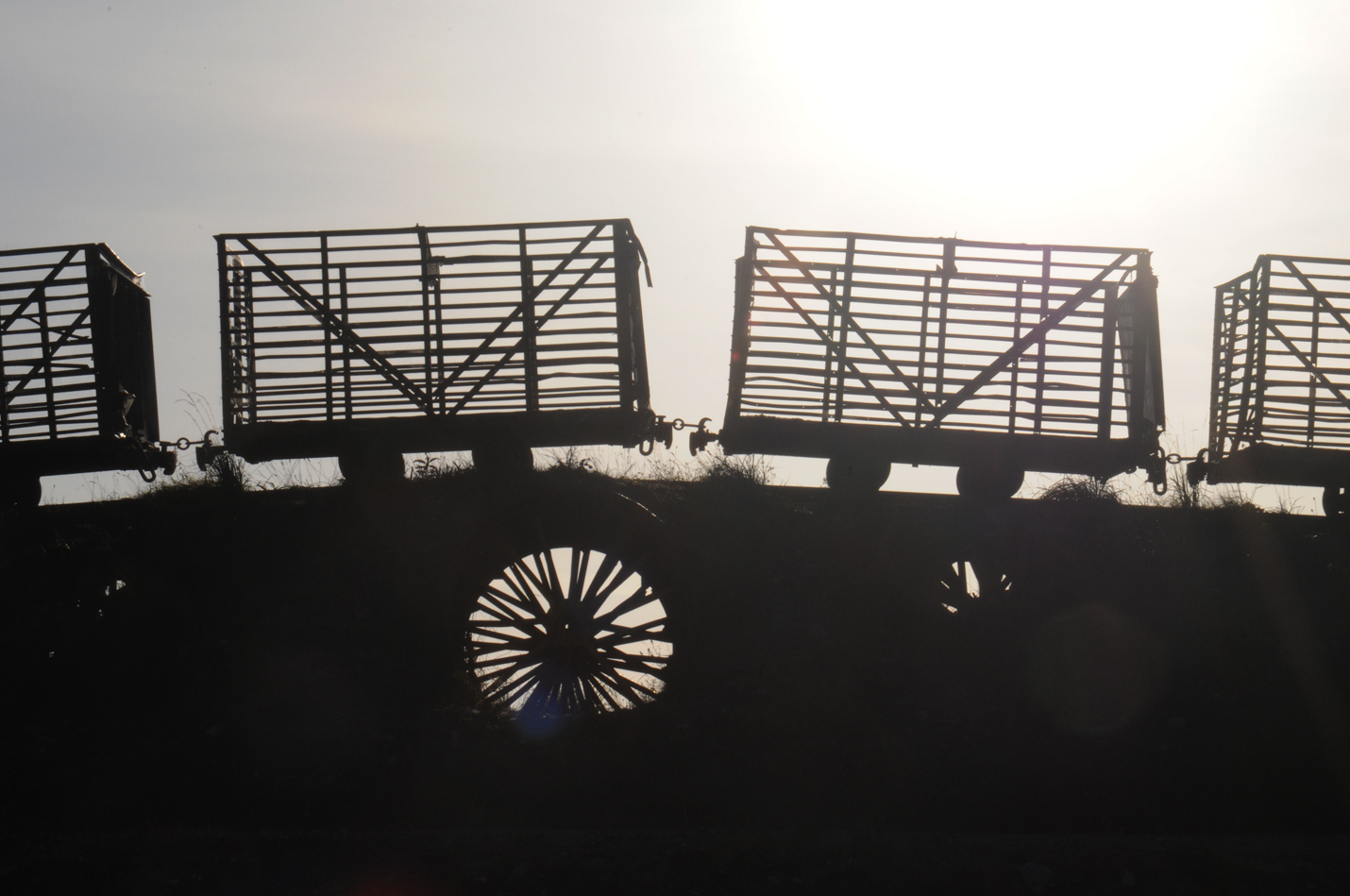
Sky Train by Mike Bulfin

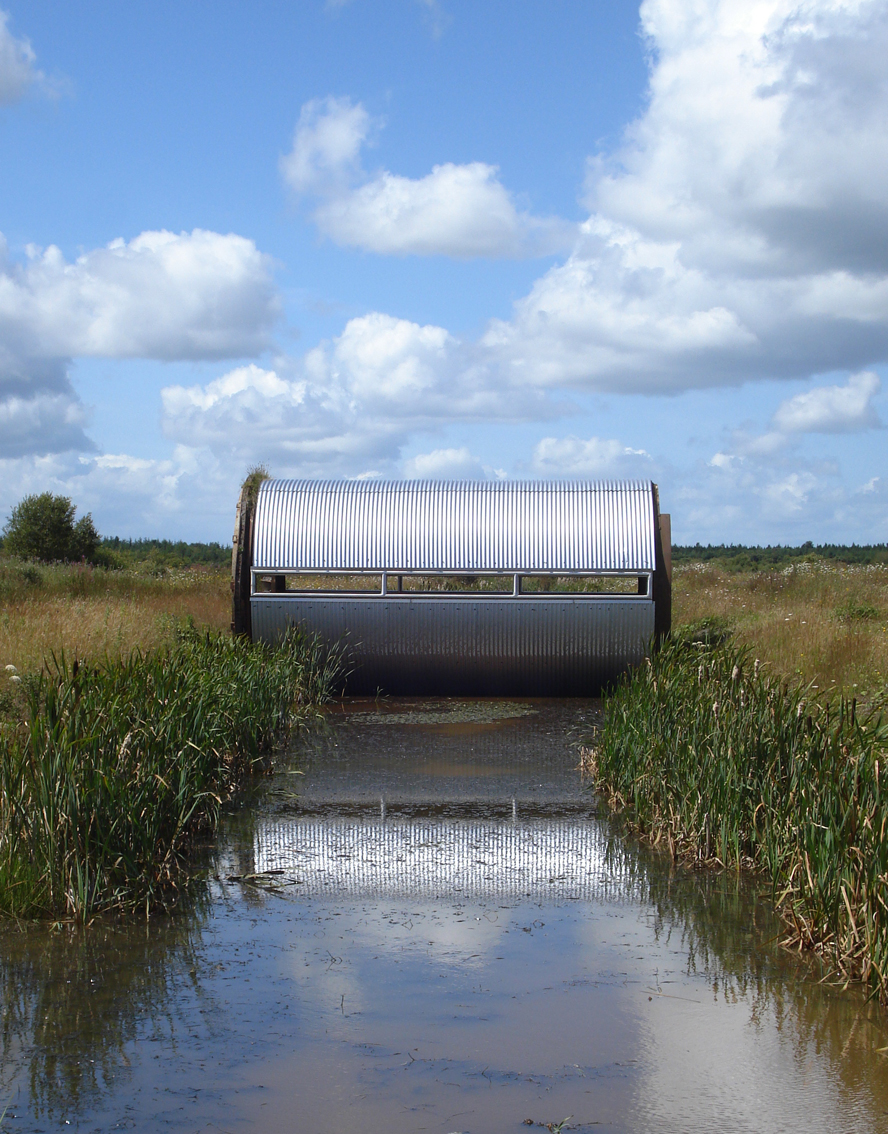
Tippler Bridge by Kevin O'Dwyer
