= John Burke (artist) =

Irish sculptor (1946–2006)

- Born: 11 May 1946; Clonmel, County Tipperary, Ireland
- Died: 11 Dec 2006

John Burke (11 May 1946 – 11 December 2006) was an Irish sculptor.

Burke studied at the Crawford School of Art and Design in Cork and at the Royal Academy of London. He spent most of his career in the Cork area and for a time taught at Crawford, where his students included Eilis O'Connell and Vivienne Roche. Burke was a founding member of Aosdána in 1981.

== Works ==
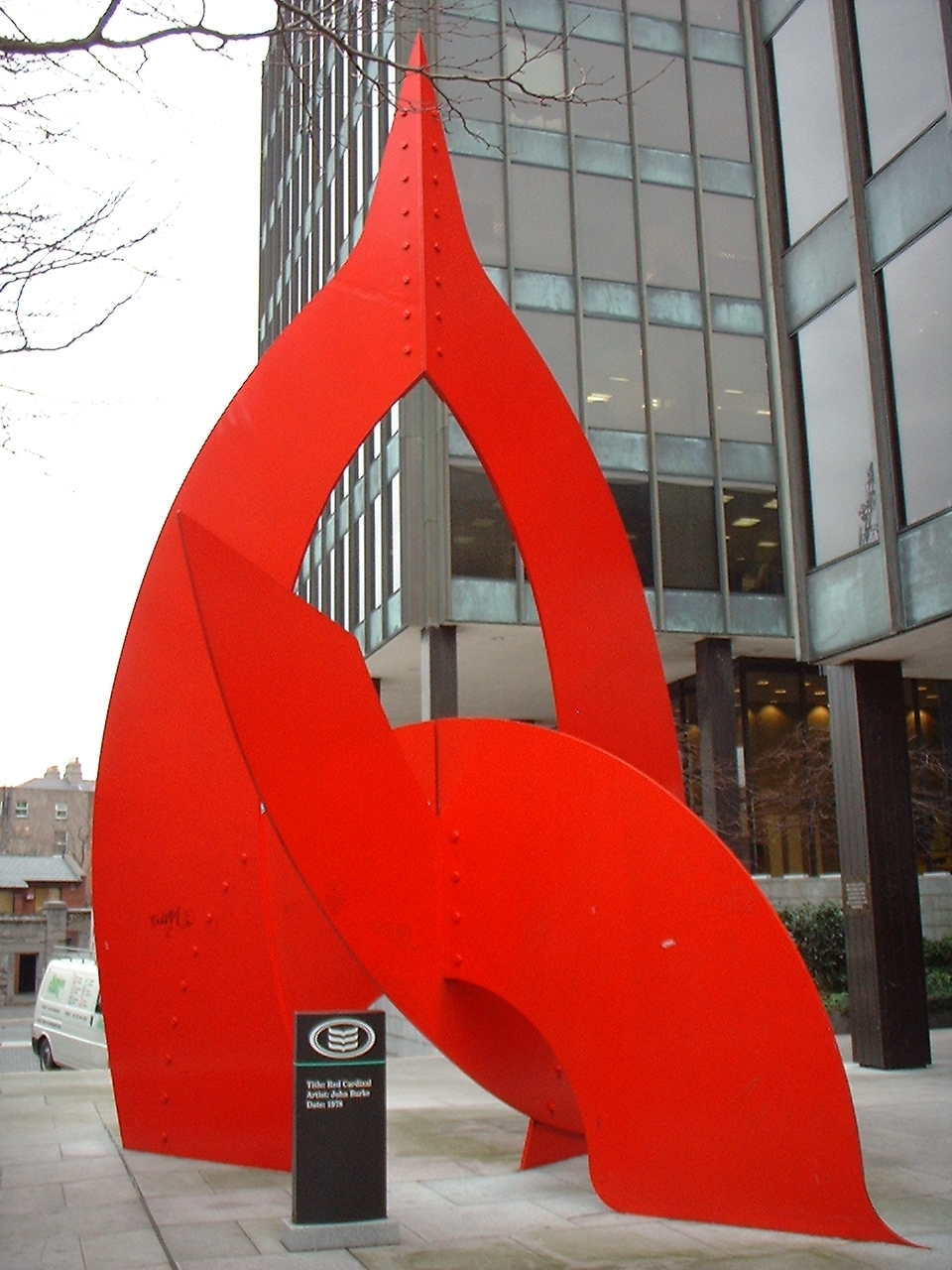
Red Cardinal (1978)

- Etsumi (1973, Belfast, Ulster Mus)
- Red Cardinal (1978, Dublin, Bank of Ireland Headquarters)
- Kingfisher (1984, Cork, Wilton Roundabout)
