= William Bulfin =

Irish-Argentine journalist

William Bulfin (1 November 1863 – February 1910) was an Irish, and later Argentine, author, journalist, newspaper editor and publisher. He was the fourth son in a family of nine boys and one girl, the children of William Bulfin, of Derrinlough, Birr, County Offaly, Ireland, and Margaret Grogan of Croghan, County Offaly.

== History ==
He attended the national school in Cloghan, where he is said to have been taught by the father of Easter Rising leader Thomas MacDonagh, the Classical Academy and the Presentation Schools in Birr, and the Royal Charter School at Banagher.

His maternal uncle, Father Vincent Grogan, was Provincial of the Passionist Fathers in a province that included a monastery in Buenos Aires, Argentina. Bulfin emigrated to Argentina in 1884 with his elder brother Peter and they moved to the pampas.

Hundreds of Irish emigrants from counties Longford and Westmeath had settled in Argentina. The Bulfins had with them letters of introduction to the Passionist Fathers in Buenos Aires, and went to the estancia (ranch) of one of these, Don Juan Dowling from Longford. There he met the woman he would marry, Anne O’Rourke from Ballacurra, Ballymore, County Westmeath.

On the pampas, his preference was for the company of the gauchos and the Irish. Observing his countrymen and the hard-riding Spanish-Indian cowboys he began to write homely sketches and stories about their lives for The Southern Cross, a weekly paper in Buenos Aires owned and edited by Michael Dineen from County Cork.

Years later, he wrote in The Southern Cross about the vanishing gaucho in a way that showed how closely he had observed and how he had been attracted by the vivid pattern of life on the Argentinian grasslands. "He had his ranch and his horses and his work at trooping or marking or herding sheep, and he drank his anis or cana, and took his mate under his own fig tree, and gambled with bone or cards or on horse-racing at the pulperías of all the camps from the Arroyo Luna to the Medano Blanco, and along the frontier from Gainza to Melincué."

In 1902, after relocating to Buenos Aires, he wrote:

It was a train brought me back to Buenos Aires from the camp. I mean it was the train which gave me the call ... [I]t happened that I had not seen a train for four years ... I went to a certain railway station one afternoon to send a telegram to Buenos Aires, and while I was there the train came in. I do not know whether it was the engine, or a look at the passengers, or the roar and rattle of the wheels, or all of these things together, that set the wheels of memory revolving. The city life of student days came back, the city began to call. As I galloped home it struck me that the camp was not meant for me, after all. It was telling me to clear out. ‘You are not good enough for me’, it seemed to be saying. ‘Go away, go back to your cities, and fair weather after you; don’t be afraid that I’II miss you or a thousand like you.’ And what the city said was this: 'Come back. For four and twenty years at home and abroad you have been keeping away from me. But it’s no use. You cannot help yourself. You were born in the open country ... but you are mine. You must come. I am the hag that men call the spirit of city life — ugly, selfish, corrupt, insincere, but I call you and you must come.

A year after his arrival in the city he was sub-editing on The Southern Cross, and shortly afterwards he was both proprietor and editor of that paper. The sketches he wrote were published in The Southern Cross and also, due to his friendship with Arthur Griffith, in the United Irishman and Sinn Féin. Eventually they reached the New York Daily News. They were published in book form in 1907 by Gill. In 1902 he wrote Rambles In Eirinn, a well-regarded account of his travels around Ireland by bicycle on his return to his homeland.

He became ill during a visit to the United States fundraising with The O'Rahilly for Arthur Griffith's newspaper Sinn Fein. Returned to Ireland on New Year's Day 1910, and died a month later. His children included Eamon Bulfin, an Irish republican and political activist following the Irish Civil War, and Catalina (d. 1976), an activist who would marry Seán MacBride, the son of Irish nationalist icons Major John MacBride and Maud Gonne. He had three other daughters: Mary (d. 1930), Aileen (d. 1985) and Anita Bulfin (died 1923). His brother Patrick died in 1916. His uncle, also Patrick Bulfin, was a Lord Mayor of Dublin in 1871 who died in office of typhoid after less than six months. The latter's son was the British general Sir Edward Bulfin.
