= Colm O'Donnell =

Irish chemist and engineer

- Education: University College Dublin
- Scientific career
- Workplaces: University College Dublin

Colm P. O'Donnell is an Irish chemist and engineer. He is a professor of biosystems and food engineering at the University College Dublin who is active in the field of process analytical technology (PAT). He is also a head of university School of biosystems and food engineering — as well as a chairperson of the Dairy processing technical committee of International Federation for Process Analysis and Control (IFPAC).
