= Afri (disambiguation) =

Afri may refer to:

- Afri, a people in north Africa after which the continent of Africa may be named
- Afri (organisation), an Irish organisation that promotes human rights, peace and justice
- Afri-can, also known as a ramkie, a type of guitar
- Afri-Cola, a cola soft drink produced in Germany
- Afriski, the only skiing resort in Lesotho
- Wadsworth Jarrell and the AFRI-COBRA movement about the African Commune of Bad Relevant Artists

== See also ==
- Afer (disambiguation)
- Africa
