= Great Famine (Ireland) =

1845–1852 mass starvation in Ireland

Great Famine An Gorta Mór
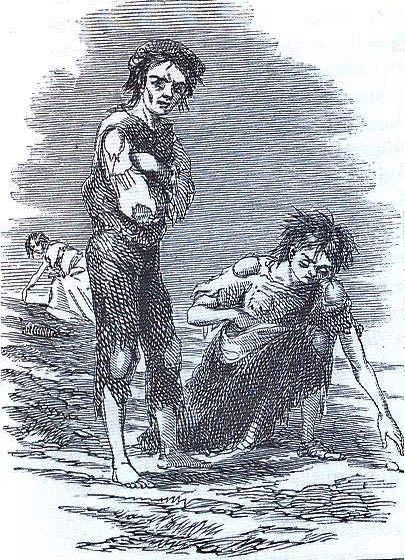
- Scene at Skibbereen during the Great Famine, The Illustrated London News, 1847
- Location: Ireland
- Period: 1845–1852
- Total deaths: 775,000–1,500,000
- Causes: Policy failure, potato blight
- Theory: Corn Laws; Gregory clause; Encumbered Estates' Court; Crime and Outrage Bill (Ireland) 1847; Young Irelander Rebellion of 1848; Three Fs; Poor Law Amendment Act
- Effect on demographics: Population fell by 20–25% due to death and emigration
- Consequences: Permanent change in the country's demographic, political, and cultural landscape
- Preceded by: Irish Famine of 1740–1741 (Bliain an Áir)
- Succeeded by: Irish Famine of 1879 (An Gorta Beag)

The Great Famine, also known as the Great Hunger (Irish: an Gorta Mór [ənˠ ˈɡɔɾˠt̪ˠə ˈmˠoːɾˠ]), the Famine and the Irish Potato Famine, was a period of mass starvation and disease in Ireland from 1845 to 1852. With an excess death impact of 775,000 to 1.5 million, and related mass emigration of 1 million or more, it constituted a major historical social crisis and had a significant impact on Irish society and history.

The proximate cause of the famine was the infection of potato crops by blight throughout Europe. The impact of blight on food supply caused 100,000 deaths outside Ireland, and influenced much of the unrest that culminated in European Revolutions of 1848. Longer-term reasons for the scale of the famine's impact included the system of absentee landlordism and single-crop dependence. Initial government actions to alleviate famine distress, which were constructive but limited, were ended by a new Whig administration in London that pursued a laissez-faire economic doctrine. Additionally, there was a widespread belief among members of the British upper class, and therefore among members of the British government, that the famine was divine judgement or that the Irish lacked moral character. Aid resumed only to some degree at a later stage. Large quantities of food were exported from Ireland during the famine, and the refusal of London to bar such exports, as had been done on previous occasions, was an immediate and continuing source of controversy. This controversy contributed to the exacerbation of the Irish issue in British politics, the intensification of Irish nationalism and of anti-British sentiment, and to the campaign for independence. Additionally, the famine indirectly resulted in the eviction of tens of thousands of households, a situation exacerbated by a provision that forbade access to workhouse aid for those possessing more than one-quarter acre of land, resulting in forced sale and surrender of land.

While crop failures began in 1845, the worst year of the famine was 1847, which became known as "Black '47". The population of Ireland on the eve of the famine was approximately 8.5 to 8.75 million. During the Great Hunger, roughly one million people died and over one million more emigrated, causing the country's population to fall by 20–25% between 1841 and 1871, with some towns' populations falling by as much as 67%. Between 1845 and 1855, at least 2.1 million people left Ireland, one of the greatest exoduses from a single island in history.

The famine is considered a defining moment in the history of Ireland. Its effects permanently changed the island's demographic, political, and cultural landscape, with the deaths and mass emigration spurring a century-long population decline. For both the native Irish and those in the resulting diaspora, the famine became part of folk memory. Strained relations between many Irish people and the then ruling British government worsened further because of the famine, heightening ethnic and sectarian tensions and boosting nationalism and republicanism both in Ireland and among Irish emigrants around the world. Considerable debate also exists regarding nomenclature for the event, including whether to use the terms "Famine", "Potato Famine" or "Great Hunger".

When the potato blight returned to Ireland in the 1879 famine, the Land League boycotted "notorious landlords", and its members physically blocked the evictions of farmers. The resulting reduction in homelessness and house demolitions led to a significant decrease in the number of deaths.

== Causes and contributing factors ==
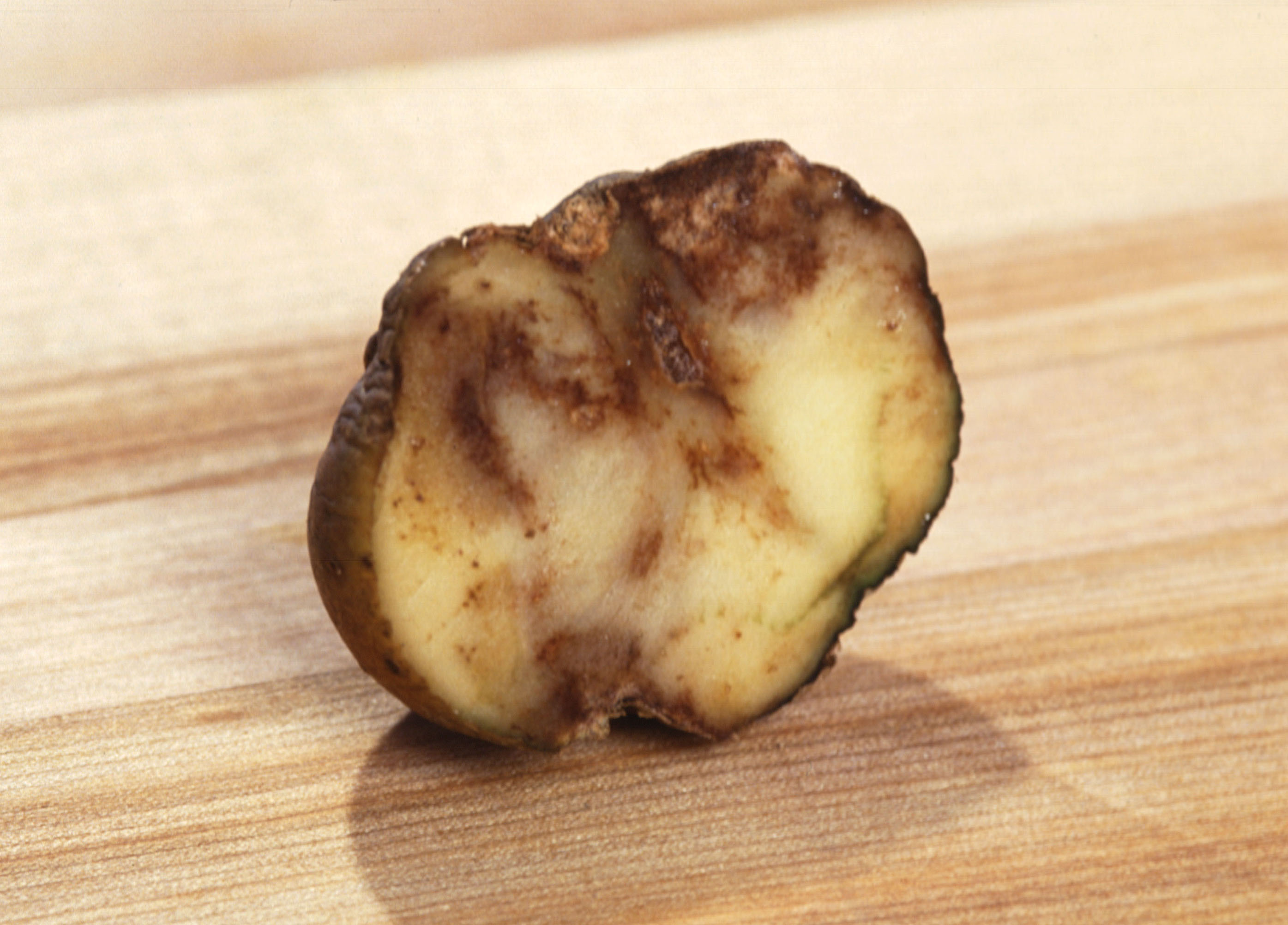
A potato infected with late blight, showing typical rot symptoms

Ireland was incorporated into the United Kingdom in January 1801 following the passage of the Acts of Union. Executive power lay with the Lord Lieutenant of Ireland and Chief Secretary for Ireland, who were appointed by the British government. Ireland sent 105 members of parliament to the House of Commons of the United Kingdom, and Irish representative peers elected 28 of their own number to sit for life in the House of Lords. Between 1832 and 1859, 70% of Irish representatives were landowners or the sons of landowners.

In the 40 years that followed the union, successive British governments grappled with the challenges of governing a country that had, as Benjamin Disraeli said in 1844, "a starving population, an absentee aristocracy, an alien established Protestant church, and in addition, the weakest executive in the world". One historian calculated that between 1801 and 1845 there had been 114 commissions and 61 special committees inquiring into the state of Ireland, and that "without exception their findings prophesied disaster; Ireland was on the verge of starvation, her population rapidly increasing, three-quarters of her labourers unemployed, housing conditions appalling and the standard of living unbelievably low".

Lectures printed in 1847 by John Hughes, Bishop of New York, provide a contemporary examination of the antecedent causes, particularly the political climate, in which the Irish famine occurred.

=== Landlords and tenants ===
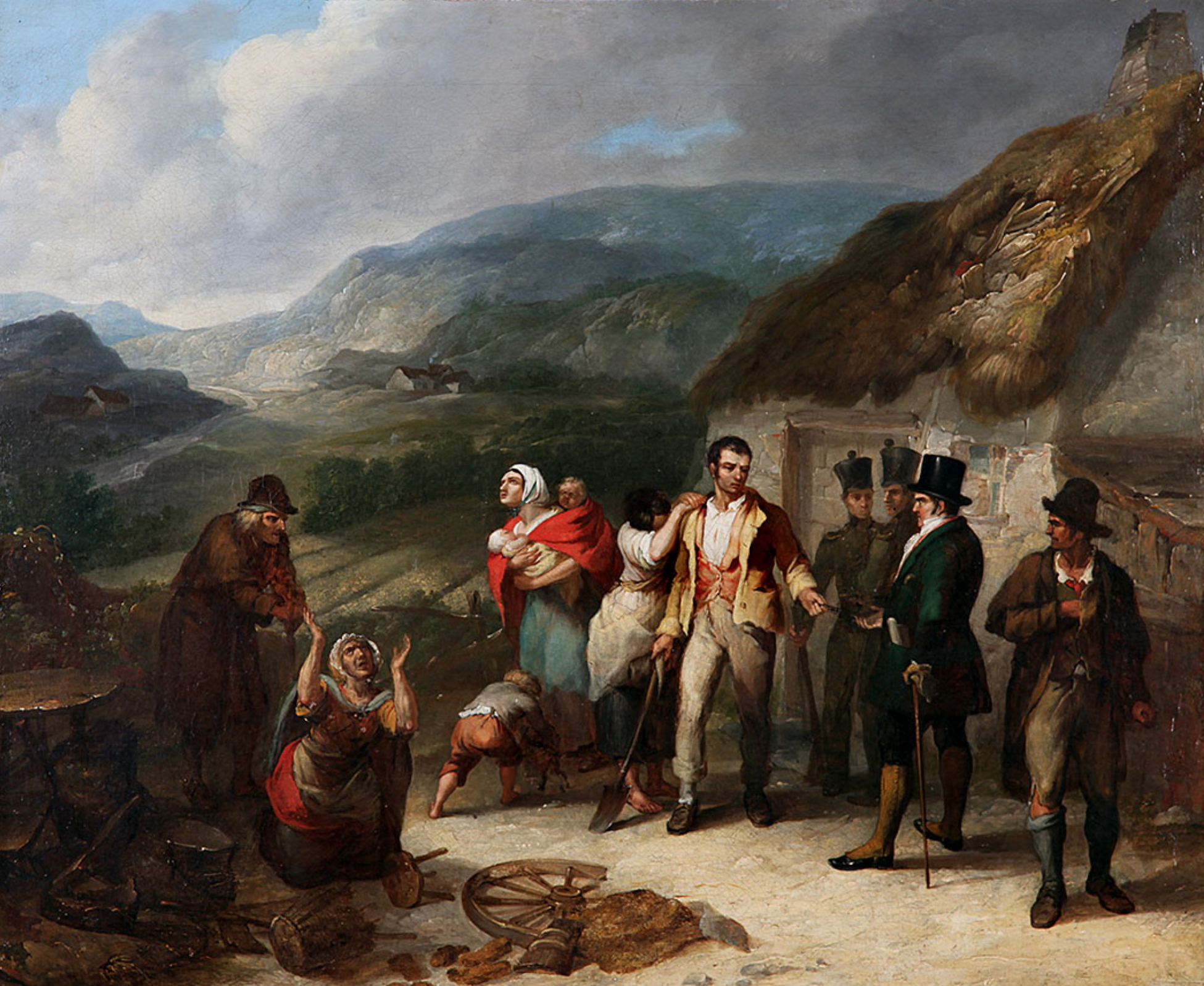
An 1845 painting depicting the forced eviction of Irish tenants during the Famine era

The "middleman system" for managing landed property was introduced in the 18th century. Rent collection was left to the landlords' agents, or middlemen. This system assured landlords of a regular income and relieved them of direct responsibility while leaving tenants vulnerable to exploitation by the middlemen. The effectiveness of middlemen was measured by the rental income they could extract from tenants. Middlemen leased large tracts of land from the landlords on long leases with fixed rents and sublet to tenants, keeping any money raised in excess to the rent paid to the landlord. This system, coupled with minimal oversight of the middlemen, incentivised harsh exploitation of tenants. Middlemen would split a holding into smaller and smaller parcels so as to increase the amount of rent they could obtain. Tenants could be evicted for reasons such as non-payment of rents (which were high), or a landlord's decision to raise sheep instead of grain crops. Cottiers paid their rent by working for the landlord, while spalpeens (itinerant labourers) paid for short-term leases through temporary day work.

A majority of Catholics, who constituted 80% of the Irish population, lived in conditions of poverty and insecurity. At the top of the social hierarchy was the Ascendancy class, composed of English and Anglo-Irish families who owned most of the land and held significant power over their tenants. Some of their estates were extensive; for example, the Earl of Lucan owned more than 60,000 acres (240 km^{2}). Many of these landowners lived in England and functioned as absentee landlords. The rental revenue was mostly sent to England.

In 1800, the 1st Earl of Clare observed of landlords that "confiscation is their common title". According to historian Cecil Woodham-Smith, landlords regarded the land as a source of income, from which as much as possible was to be extracted. With the peasantry "brooding over their discontent in sullen indignation" (in the words of the Earl of Clare), the landlords largely viewed the countryside as a hostile place in which to live. Some landlords visited their property only once or twice in a lifetime, if ever. The rents from Ireland were generally spent elsewhere; an estimated £6,000,000 was remitted out of Ireland in 1842. (Note: About £590 million in 2025.)

In 1843, the British government recognized that the land management system in Ireland was the foundational cause of disaffection in the country. The prime minister established a Royal Commission, chaired by the Earl of Devon (Devon Commission), to enquire into the laws regarding the occupation of land. Irish politician Daniel O'Connell called this commission "perfectly one-sided", noting that it was composed of landlords with no tenant representation.

In February 1845, Devon reported:

It would be impossible adequately to describe the privations which they [the Irish labourer and his family] habitually and silently endure ... in many districts their only food is the potato, their only beverage water ... their cabins are seldom a protection against the weather ... a bed or a blanket is a rare luxury ... and nearly in all their pig and a manure heap constitute their only property.

The Commissioners concluded they could not "forbear expressing our strong sense of the patient endurance which the labouring classes have exhibited under sufferings greater, we believe, than the people of any other country in Europe have to sustain". The commission stated that poor relations between landlord and tenant were principally responsible for this suffering. Landlords were described in evidence before the commission as "land sharks", "bloodsuckers", and "the most oppressive species of tyrant that ever lent assistance to the destruction of a country".

Because any improvement a tenant made on a holding became the landlord's property when the lease expired or was terminated, tenants had limited incentive to make improvements. Most tenants had no security of tenure on the land; as tenants "at will", they could be evicted at the landlord's discretion. The only exception to this arrangement was in Ulster, where, under a practice known as "tenant right", tenants were compensated for any improvements they made to their holdings. According to Woodham-Smith, the commission stated that "the superior prosperity and tranquillity of Ulster, compared with the rest of Ireland, were due to tenant right".

Landlords in Ireland often used their powers without compunction, and tenants lived in fear of them. Woodham-Smith writes that, under these circumstances, "industry and enterprise were extinguished and a peasantry created which was one of the most destitute in Europe".

=== Tenants and subdivisions ===
Immense population growth, from about 2 million in 1700 to 8 million by the time of the Great Famine, led to increased division of holdings and a consequent reduction in their average size. By 1845, 24% of all Irish tenant farms were of 0.4–2 hectares (1–5 acres) in size, while 40% were of 2–6 hectares (5–15 acres). Holdings were so small that no crop other than potatoes would suffice to feed a family. Shortly before the famine, the British government reported that poverty was so widespread that one-third of all Irish small holdings could not support the tenant families after rent was paid; the families survived only by earnings as seasonal migrant labour in England and Scotland. After the famine, reforms were implemented making it illegal to further divide land holdings.

The 1841 census showed a population of just over eight million. Two-thirds of people depended on agriculture for survival but rarely received a working wage. They had to work for their landlords in return for a small patch of land to farm. This forced Ireland's peasantry to practice continuous monoculture, as the potato was the only crop that could meet nutritional needs.

=== Potato dependency ===
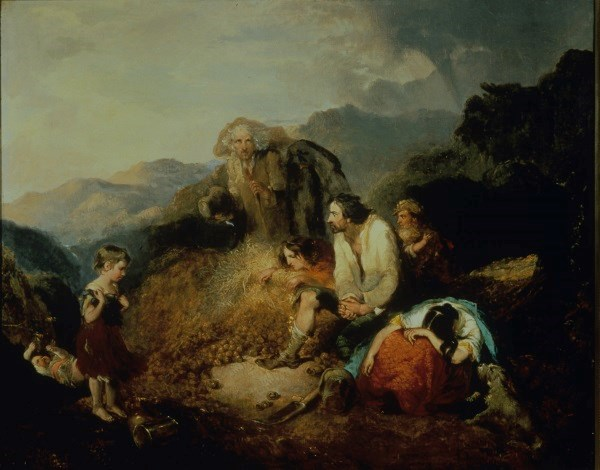
An Irish Peasant Family Discovering the Blight of their Store by Cork artist Daniel MacDonald, c. 1847

Walter Raleigh is often credited with introducing the potato to Ireland, bringing the first plants to this new estate, in Myrtle Grove, Youghal, Cork, sometime soon after 1586, and later his estate in Lismore, County Waterford. Though Anthony Southwell (1579-1623), a contemporary, Norfolk born, Munster Planter, or Francis Drake, are similarly credited with their introduction to County Cork, Ireland. The cultivation of the crop was promoted by the likes of The Royal Society, and John Haughton, from the 17th century. By the late 17th century, they had become widespread as a supplementary food, but the main Irish diet, at that time, was still based on butter, milk, and grain products.

The Irish economy grew between 1760 and 1815 due to infrastructure expansion and the Napoleonic Wars (1805–1815), which had increased the demand for food in Britain. Tillage increased so much that only a small amount of land was available to small farmers to feed themselves. The potato was adopted as a primary food source because of its quick growth in a comparatively small space. By 1800, it had become a staple food for one in three Irish people, especially in winter. It eventually became a staple year-round for farmers. A disproportionate share of the potatoes grown in Ireland were the Irish Lumper, creating a lack of genetic variability among potato plants, which increased vulnerability to disease.

Potatoes were essential to the expansion of the cottier system; they supported an extremely cheap workforce, but at the cost of lower living standards. For the labourer, "a potato wage" shaped the expanding agrarian economy. The potato was also used extensively as a fodder crop for livestock immediately before the famine. About 33% of production, amounting to 5,000,000 short tons (4,500,000 t), was typically used in this way.

=== Blight in Ireland ===
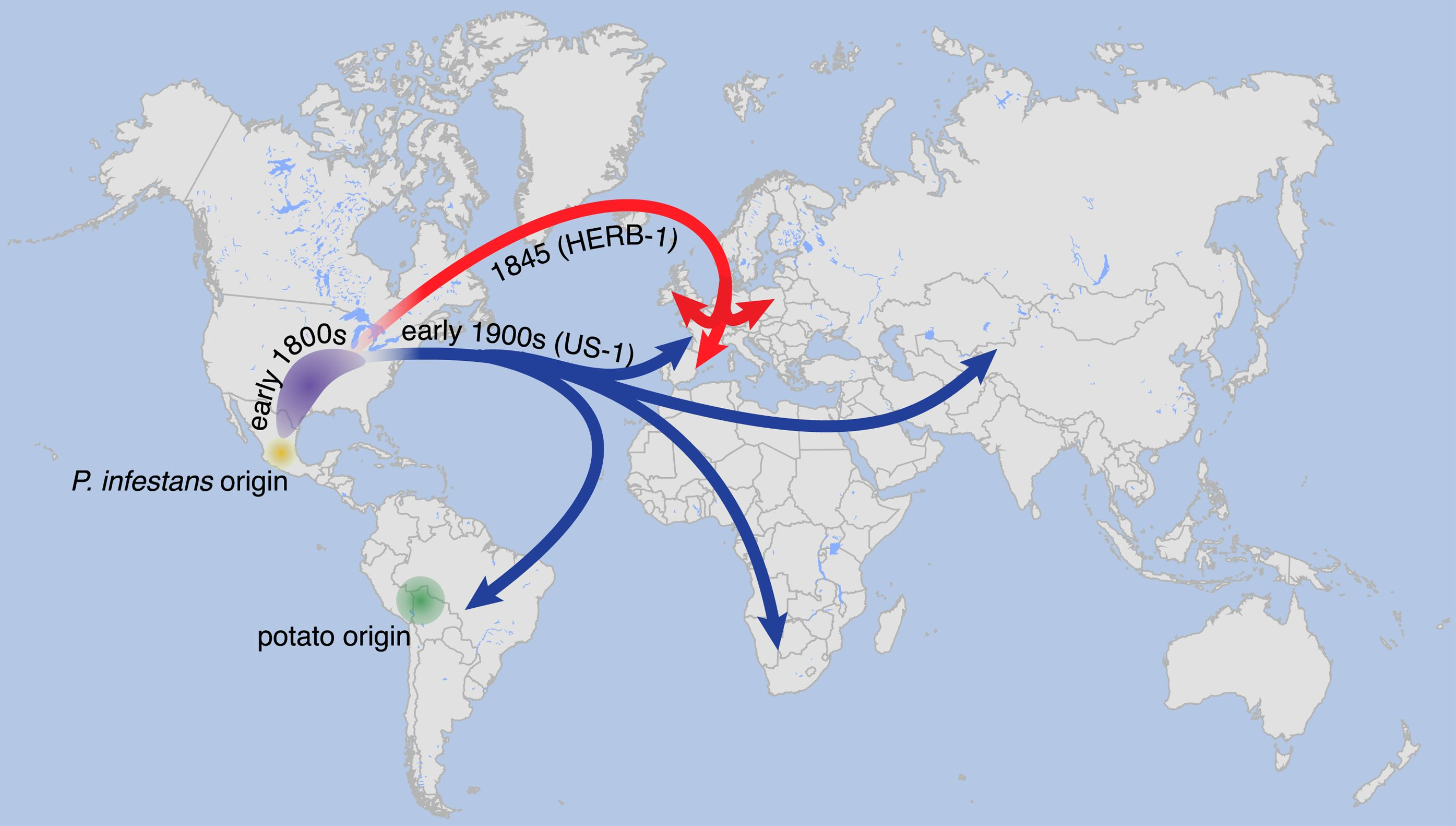
Suggested paths of migration and diversification of P. infestans lineages HERB-1 and US-1

Before the arrival of Phytophthora infestans, commonly known as "blight", only two main potato plant diseases had been discovered. One was "dry rot" or "taint", and the other was a virus known popularly as "curl". Phytophthora infestans is an oomycete (a variety of parasitic, non-photosynthetic organism closely related to brown algae, and not a fungus).

In 1851, the Census of Ireland Commissioners recorded 24 failures of the potato crop going back to 1728, of varying severity. General crop failures, through disease or frost, were recorded in 1739, 1740, 1770, 1800, and 1807. In 1821 and 1822, the potato crop failed in Munster and Connaught. In 1830 and 1831, counties Mayo, Donegal, and Galway suffered likewise. In 1832, 1833, 1834, and 1836, dry rot and curl caused serious losses, and in 1835 the potato failed in Ulster. Widespread failures throughout Ireland occurred in 1836, 1837, 1839, 1841, and 1844. According to Woodham-Smith, "the unreliability of the potato was an accepted fact in Ireland".

Experts are still unsure how and when blight arrived in Europe; it almost certainly was not present before 1842, and probably arrived in 1844. The pathogen has been traced to the Toluca Valley in Mexico, whence it spread within North America and then to Europe. The 1845–1846 blight was caused by the HERB-1 strain of the blight.

Potato production during the Great Famine. Note: years 1844, 1845, 1846, and 1848 are extrapolated.

In 1844, Irish newspapers carried reports of a disease that had attacked the potato crops in America for two years. In 1843 and 1844, blight largely destroyed the potato crops in the Eastern United States. Ships from Baltimore, Philadelphia, or New York City could have carried diseased potatoes from these areas to European ports. American plant pathologist William C. Paddock posited that the blight was transported via potatoes carried to feed passengers on clipper ships from America to Ireland. Once introduced in Ireland and Europe, blight spread rapidly. By mid-August 1845, it had reached much of northern and central Europe; Belgium, The Netherlands, northern France, and southern England had all already been affected.

On 16 August 1845, The Gardeners' Chronicle and Horticultural Gazette reported "a blight of unusual character" on the Isle of Wight. A week later, on 23 August, it reported that "A fearful malady has broken out among the potato crop ... In Belgium the fields are said to be completely desolated. There is hardly a sound sample in Covent Garden market ... As for cure for this distemper, there is none." These reports were extensively covered in Irish newspapers. On 11 September, the Freeman's Journal reported on "the appearance of what is called 'cholera' in potatoes in Ireland, especially in the north". On 13 September, (Note: Kinealy put the date at the 16th.) The Gardeners' Chronicle announced: "We stop the Press with very great regret to announce that the potato Murrain has unequivocally declared itself in Ireland."

Nevertheless, the British government remained optimistic over the next few weeks, as it received conflicting reports. Only when the crop was harvested in October did the scale of destruction become apparent. Prime Minister Robert Peel wrote to James Graham in mid-October that he found the reports "very alarming", but allayed his fears by claiming that there was "always a tendency to exaggeration in Irish news".

Crop loss in 1845 has been estimated at anywhere from one-third to one-half of cultivated acreage. The Dublin Mansion House Committee for the Relief of Distress in Ireland, to which hundreds of letters were directed from all over Ireland, claimed on 19 November 1845 to have ascertained beyond doubt that "considerably more than one-third of the entire of the potato crop ... has been already destroyed".

In 1846, three-quarters of the harvest was lost to blight. According to Cormac Ó Gráda, the first attack of potato blight caused considerable hardship in rural Ireland from the autumn of 1846, when the first deaths from starvation were recorded. Seed potatoes were scarce in 1847. Few had been sown, so, despite average yields, hunger continued. 1848 yields were only two-thirds of normal. Since over three million Irish people were totally dependent on potatoes for food, hunger and famine were widespread.

== Reaction in Ireland ==
In early November 1845, a deputation from the citizens of Dublin, including the Duke of Leinster, Lord Cloncurry, Daniel O'Connell and the Lord Mayor, went to the Lord Lieutenant of Ireland, Lord Heytesbury, to discuss the issue. They offered suggestions such as opening the ports to foreign corn, stopping distillation from grain, prohibiting the export of foodstuffs, and providing employment through public works. Lord Heytesbury urged them not to be alarmed, that they "were premature", that scientists were enquiring into all those matters. (Note: Lyon Playfair and John Lindley were sent from England to investigate with the local assistance of Robert Kane.)

John Mitchel, a leading Irish nationalist, wrote one of the first widely circulated tracts on the famine, The Last Conquest of Ireland (Perhaps), published in 1861. It contained a sentence that has since become famous: "The Almighty, indeed, sent the potato blight, but the English created the Famine." In 1848, Mitchel was charged with sedition because of his writings, but this charge was dropped. He was convicted by a packed jury under the newly enacted Treason Felony Act and sentenced to 14 years transportation to Bermuda.

According to Charles Gavan Duffy, The Nation insisted that the proper remedy, retaining in the country the food raised by her people until the people were fed, was one the rest of Europe had adopted, and one that even the parliaments of the Pale (i.e., before the union with Great Britain in 1801) had adopted in periods of distress.

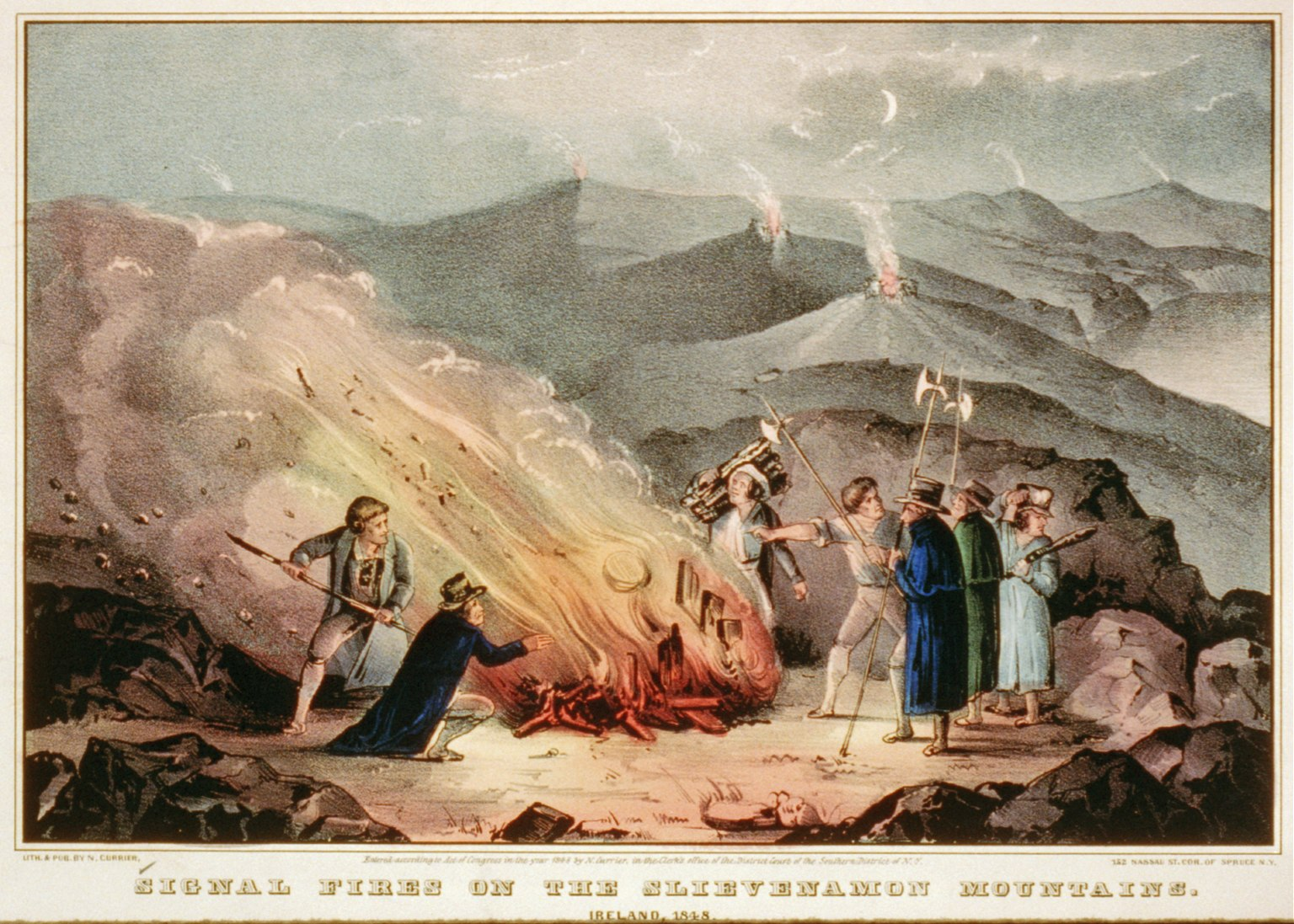
Signal fires on Slievenamon to signal the beginning of the Irish Rebellion of 1848

Contemporaneously, as found in letters from the period and in particular later oral memory, the name for the event is in Irish: An Drochshaol, though with the earlier spelling standard of the era, which was Gaelic script, it is found written as in Droċ-Ṡaoġal. In the modern era, this name, while loosely translated as "the hard-time", is always denoted with a capital letter to express its specific historic meaning.

The period of the potato blight in Ireland from 1845 to 1851 was full of political confrontation. A more radical Young Ireland group seceded from the Repeal movement in July 1846, and attempted an armed rebellion in 1848. It was unsuccessful.

In 1847, William Smith O'Brien, leader of the Young Ireland party, became one of the founding members of the Irish Confederation. He helped organise the short-lived Young Irelander Rebellion of 1848 in County Tipperary.

== Government response ==
=== Government responses to previous food shortages ===
When Ireland experienced food shortages in 1782–1783, ports were closed to exporting food by the British, with the intention to keep locally grown food in Ireland to feed the hungry. Irish food prices promptly dropped. Some merchants lobbied against the export ban, but the government overrode their protests.

=== Tory government ===
Historian F. S. L. Lyons characterised the initial response of the British government to the early, less severe phase of the famine as "prompt and relatively successful". Confronted by widespread crop failure in November 1845, Prime Minister Robert Peel purchased £100,000 worth of maize and cornmeal secretly from America with Baring Brothers initially acting as his agents. The government hoped that they would not "stifle private enterprise" and that their actions would not act as a disincentive to local relief efforts. Due to poor weather conditions, the first shipment did not arrive in Ireland until the beginning of February 1846. The initial shipments were of unground dried kernels, but the few Irish mills in operation were not equipped for milling maize and a long and complicated milling process had to be adopted before the meal could be distributed. In addition, before the cornmeal could be consumed, it had to be "very much" cooked again, or eating it could result in severe bowel complaints. Due to its yellow colour, and initial unpopularity, it became known as "Peel's brimstone".

In October 1845, Peel moved to repeal the Corn Laws—tariffs on grain which kept the price of bread high—but the issue split his party and he had insufficient support from his own colleagues to push the measure through. He resigned the premiership in December, but the opposition was unable to form a government and he was re-appointed. In March, Peel set up a programme of public works in Ireland, to include road improvement and the building of piers and fishing harbours, but the famine situation worsened during 1846, and the repeal of the Corn Laws in that year did little to help the starving Irish; the measure split the Conservative Party, leading to the fall of Peel's ministry. On 25 June, the second reading of the government's Irish Coercion Bill was defeated by 73 votes in the House of Commons by a combination of Whigs, Radicals, Irish Repealers, and protectionist Conservatives. Peel was forced to resign as prime minister on 29 June, and the Whig leader, Lord John Russell, became prime minister.

=== Whig government ===
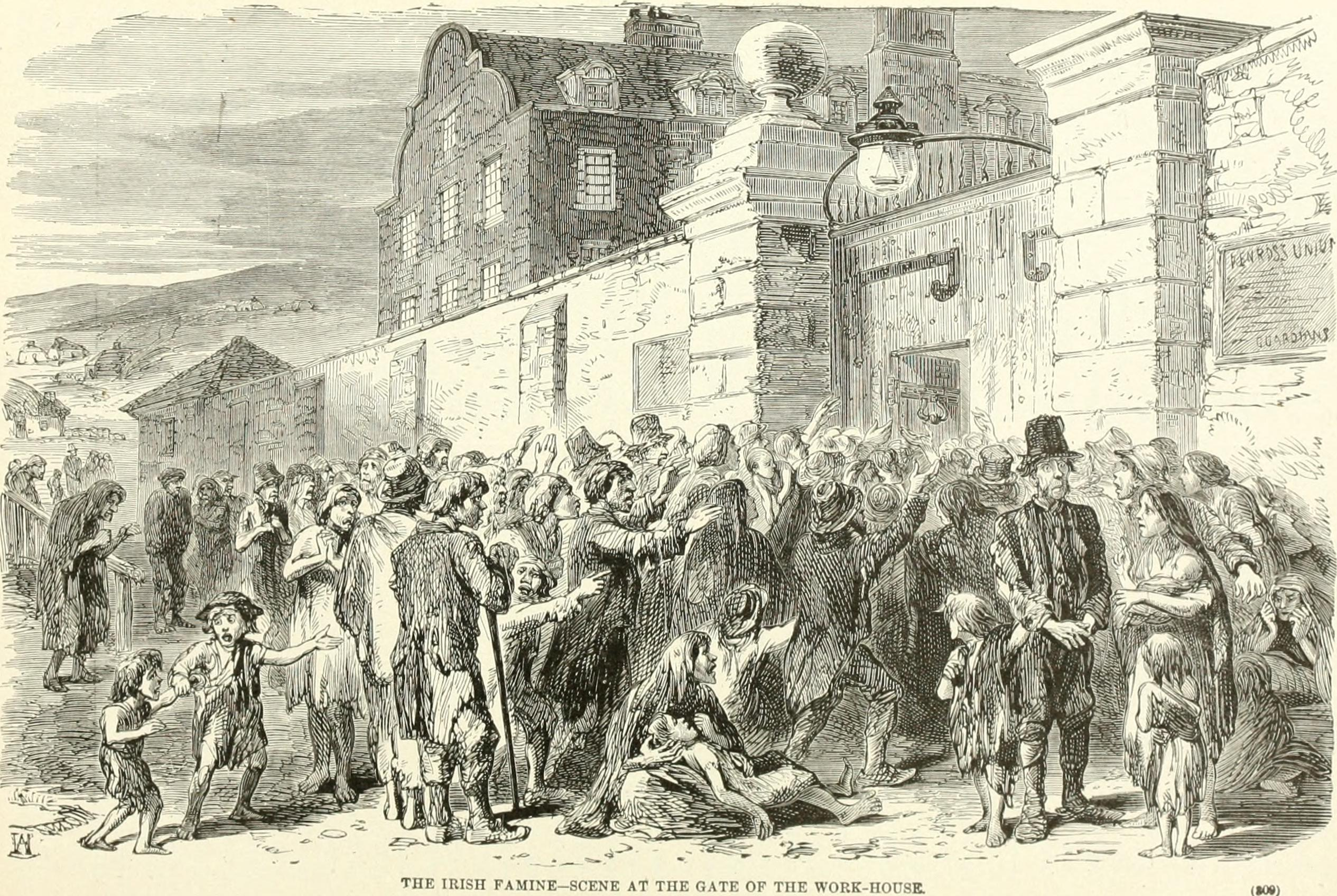
Scene at the gate of the workhouse, published 1890

The measures undertaken by Peel's successor, Russell, proved inadequate as the crisis deepened. The new Whig administration, influenced by the doctrine of laissez-faire, assumed that the market would provide the food needed. They refused to interfere with the movement of food to England, and then halted the previous government's food and relief works, leaving many hundreds of thousands of people without access to work, money, or food. Russell's ministry introduced a new programme of public works that by December 1846 employed a third or half a million people but proved impossible to administer effectively.

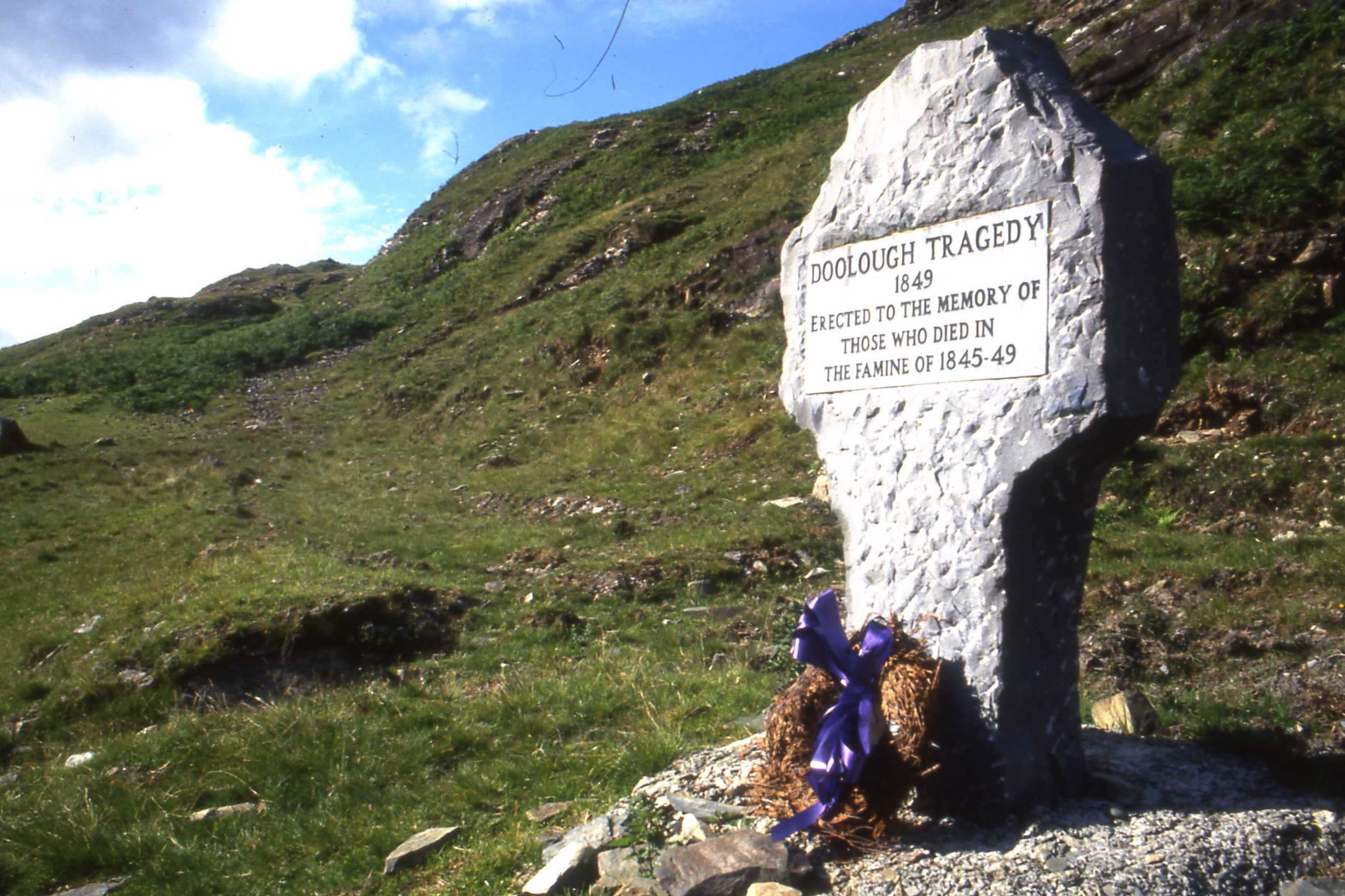
A memorial to the victims of the Doolough Tragedy (30 March 1849). To continue receiving relief, hundreds were instructed to travel many miles in bad weather. A large number died on the journey.

Charles Trevelyan, who was in charge of the administration of government relief, limited the Government's food aid programme, claiming that food would be readily imported into Ireland once people had more money to spend after wages were being paid on new public-works projects.

In a private correspondence, Trevelyan explained how the famine could bring benefit to the English; as he wrote to Edward Twisleton:

We must not complain of what we really want to obtain. If small farmers go, and their landlords are reduced to sell portions of their estates to persons who will invest capital we shall at last arrive at something like a satisfactory settlement of the country.

In January 1847, the government abandoned its policy of noninterference, realising that it had failed, and turned to a mixture of "indoor" and "outdoor" direct relief; the former administered in workhouses through the Irish Poor Laws, the latter through soup kitchens. The costs of the Poor Law fell primarily on the local landlords, some of whom in turn attempted to reduce their liability by evicting their tenants or providing some relief through the conversionist practice of Souperism.

On 1 March 1847, the Bank of England announced plans to raise a loan of £14 million to relieve the Irish crisis, and also for unfunded tax cuts. This led to the Panic of 1847, in which gold was withdrawn from circulation, so reducing the amount of bank notes that the bank could legally circulate. By 17 April 1847 the bullion reserve of the Bank of England had diminished from £15 million in January to some £9 million, and it was announced that the cost of famine relief would be transferred to local taxes in Ireland. The financial crisis temporarily improved, but the intended relief for Ireland did not materialise.

In June 1847, the Poor Relief (Ireland) Act 1847 (10 & 11 Vict. c. 31) was passed which embodied the principle, popular in Britain, that Irish property must support Irish poverty. The landed proprietors in Ireland were held in Britain to have created the conditions that led to the famine. However, it was asserted that, since the Acts of Union 1800, the British Parliament was partly to blame. This point was raised in The Illustrated London News on 13 February 1847: "There was no law it would not pass at their request, and no abuse it would not defend for them." On 24 March, The Times reported that Britain had permitted in Ireland "a mass of poverty, disaffection, and degradation without a parallel in the world. It allowed proprietors to suck the very life-blood of that wretched race".

The "Gregory clause" of the Poor Law, named after William H. Gregory, MP, (Note: William H. Gregory became the husband of Lady Gregory. He was heir to a substantial Galway estate in 1847, which he dissipated by gambling debts on the turf in the late 1840s and early 1850s.) prohibited anyone who held at least 1/4 acre (0.1 ha) from receiving relief. In practice, this meant that the many farmers who had to sell all their produce to pay rent and taxes, would have to deliver up all their land to the landlord to qualify for public outdoor relief. These factors combined to drive thousands of people off the land: 90,000 in 1849, and 104,000 in 1850.

The Incumbered Estates (Ireland) Act 1849 (12 & 13 Vict. c. 77) allowed landlord estates to be auctioned off upon the petition of creditors. Estates with debts were then auctioned off at low prices. Wealthy British speculators purchased the lands and "took a harsh view" of the tenant farmers who continued renting. The rents were raised, and tenants evicted to create large cattle grazing pastures. Between 1849 and 1854, some 50,000 families were evicted.

=== Military response ===
The Royal Navy squadron stationed in Cork under the command of Rear-Admiral Hugh Pigot undertook significant relief operations from 1846 to 1847, transporting government relief into the port of Cork and other ports along the Irish coast, being ordered on 2 January 1846 to assist distressed regions. On 27 December 1846, Trevelyan ordered every available steamship to Ireland to assist in relief, and on 14 January 1847, Pigot received orders to also distribute supplies from the British Relief Association and treat them identically to government aid. In addition, some naval officers under Pigot oversaw the logistics of relief operations further inland from Cork. In February 1847, Trevelyan ordered Royal Navy surgeons dispatched to provide medical care for those suffering from illnesses that accompanied starvation, distribute medicines that were in short supply, and assist in proper, sanitary burials for the deceased. These efforts, although significant, did not prevent mass mortality from famine and disease.

== Food exports ==
Irish grain trade in units of 1,000 quarters
Year	Exports	Imports	Surplus	Maize imports
1842	2,538	280	+2,258	20
1843	3,206	74	+3,132	3
1844	2,801	150	+2,651	5
1845	3,252	147	+3,105	34
1846	1,826	987	+839	614
1847	970	4,519	−3,549	3,287
1848	1,953	2,186	−233	1,546
1849	1,437	2,908	−1,471	1,897
1850	1,329	2,357	−1,028	1,159
1851	1,325	3,158	−1,833	1,745

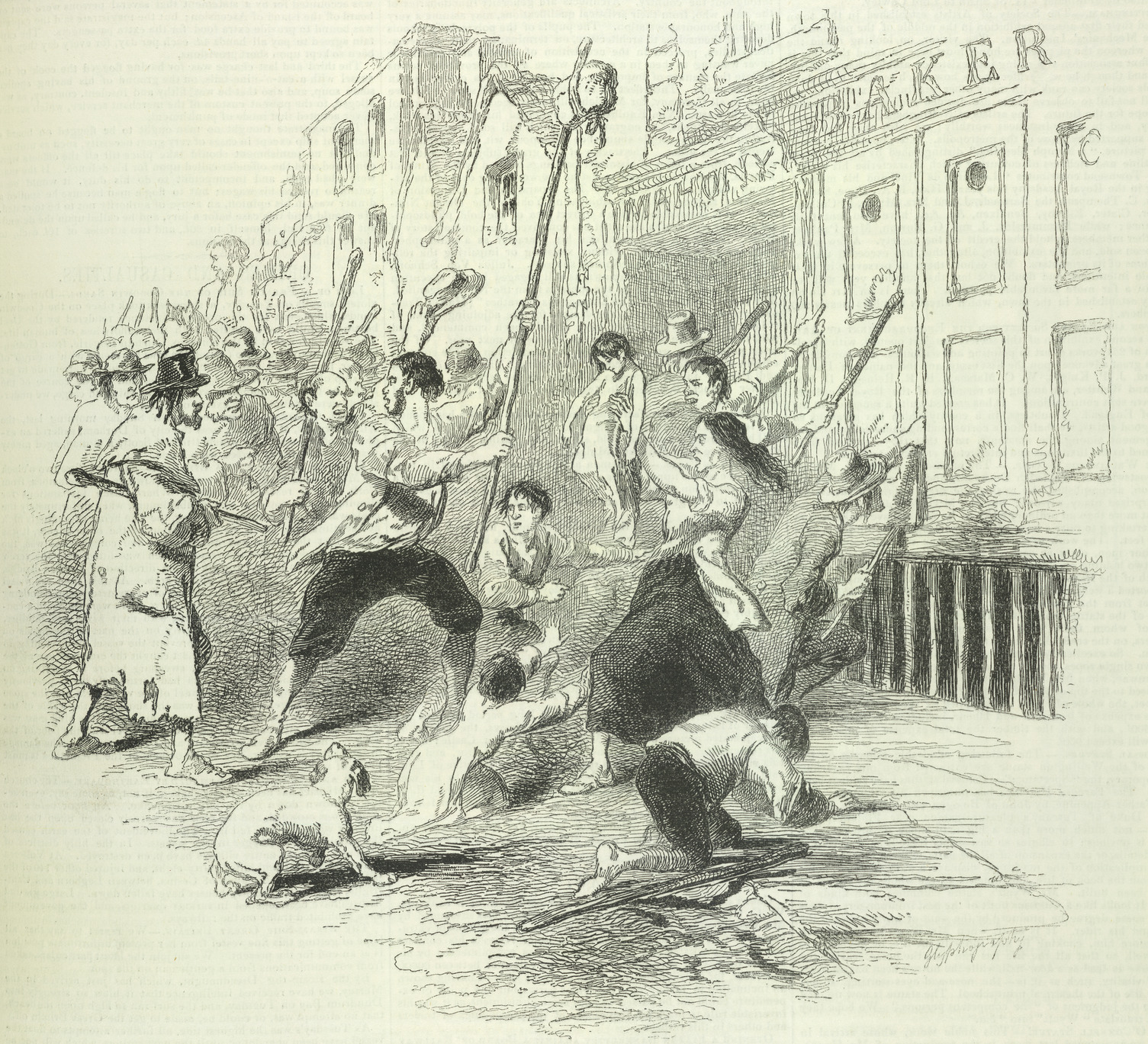
Rioters in Dungarvan attempt to break into a bakery; the poor could not afford to buy what food was available. (The Pictorial Times, 1846).

The historian Cecil Woodham-Smith wrote in The Great Hunger: Ireland 1845–1849 that no issue has provoked so much anger and embittered relations between England and Ireland "as the indisputable fact that huge quantities of food were exported from Ireland to England throughout the period when the people of Ireland were dying of starvation". While in addition to the maize imports, four times as much wheat was imported into Ireland at the height of the famine as exported. Woodham-Smith added that provision via the Poor law union workhouses by the Poor Relief (Ireland) Act 1838 (1 & 2 Vict. c. 56) had to be paid by rates levied on the local property owners, and in areas where the famine was worst, the tenants could not pay their rents to enable landlords to fund the rates and therefore the workhouses. Only by selling food, some of which would inevitably be exported, could a "virtuous circle" be created whereby the rents and rates would be paid, and the workhouses funded. Relief through the workhouse system was simply overwhelmed by the enormous scale and duration of the famine. Nicolas McEvoy, parish priest of Kells, wrote in October 1845:

On my most minute personal inspection of the potato crop in this most fertile potato-growing locale is founded my inexpressibly painful conviction that one family in twenty of the people will not have a single potato left on Christmas day next. Many are the fields I have examined and testimony the most solemn can I tender, that in the great bulk of those fields all the potatoes sizable enough to be sent to table are irreparably damaged, while for the remaining comparatively sounder fields very little hopes are entertained in consequence of the daily rapid development of the deplorable disease.

With starvation at our doors, grimly staring us, vessels laden with our sole hopes of existence, our provisions, are hourly wafted from our every port. From one milling establishment I have last night seen not less than fifty dray loads of meal moving on to Drogheda, thence to go to feed the foreigner, leaving starvation and death the sure and certain fate of the toil and sweat that raised this food.

For their respective inhabitants England, Holland, Scotland, Germany, are taking early the necessary precautions—getting provisions from every possible part of the globe; and I ask are Irishmen alone unworthy the sympathies of a paternal gentry or a paternal Government?

Let Irishmen themselves take heed before the provisions are gone. Let those, too, who have sheep, and oxen, and haggards. Self-preservation is the first law of nature. The right of the starving to try and sustain existence is a right far and away paramount to every right that property confers.

Infinitely more precious in the eyes of reason in the adorable eye of the Omnipotent Creator, is the life of the last and least of human beings than the whole united property of the entire universe. The appalling character of the crisis renders delicacy but criminal and imperatively calls for the timely and explicit notice of principles that will not fail to prove terrible arms in the hands of a neglected, abandoned starving people.

In the 5 May 2020 issue of the Dublin Review of Books, Editor Maurice Earls wrote:

Dr. McEvoy, in his grim forebodings and apocalyptic fear, was closer to the truth than the sanguine rationalists quoted in the newspapers, but McEvoy, like many others, overestimated the likelihood of mass rebellion, and even this great clerical friend of the poor could hardly have contemplated the depth of social, economic and cultural destruction which would persist and deepen over the following century and beyond. It was politics that turned a disease of potatoes and tomatoes into famine, and it was politics which ensured its disastrous aftereffects would disfigure numerous future generations.

According to historian James Donnelly, "the picture of Irish people starving as food was exported was the most powerful image in the nationalist construct of the Famine". Grain imports increased after the spring of 1847 and much of the debate "has been conducted within narrow parameters," focusing "almost exclusively on national estimates with little attempt to disaggregate the data by region or by product."

== Charity ==
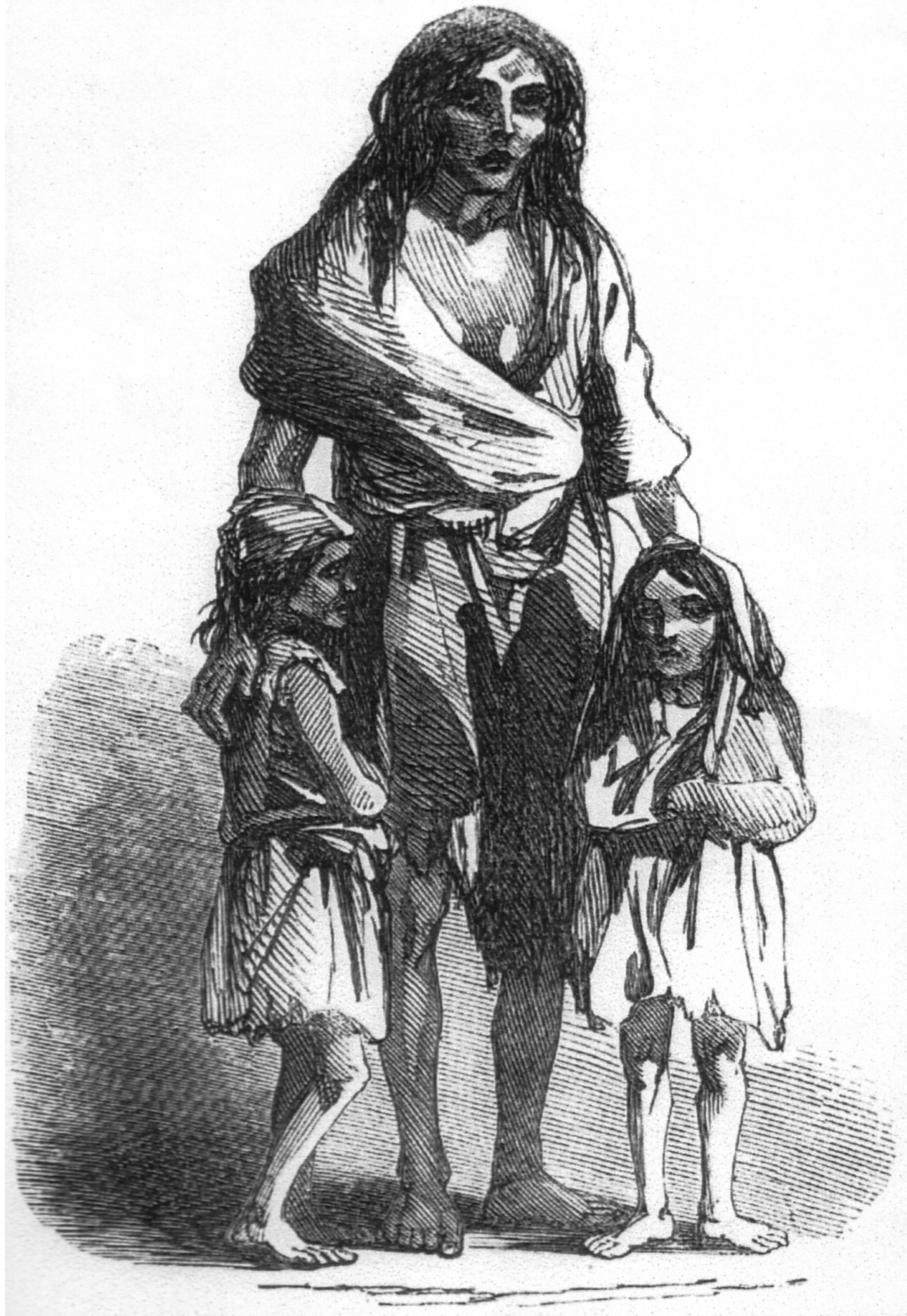
An 1849 depiction of Bridget O'Donnell and her two children during the famine

Total charitable donations for famine relief might have been about £1.5 million, of which £856,500 came from outside Ireland. Donations within Ireland are harder to trace; £380,000 of donations were officially registered but once some allowance is made for less formal donations the Irish total probably exceeds that of Britain (£525,000). People of Irish descent also contributed to funds raised outside of Ireland and those donations would be included in the region where the donation was made. English Protestants donated more to Irish famine relief than any other source outside of Ireland.

Donations by region excluding Ireland
Region	Contribution
Britain	£525,000
US	£170,000
Indian Ocean	£50,000
France	£26,000
Canada	£22,000
West Indies	£17,000
Italy	£13,000
Australia	£9,000
The Netherlands, Belgium and Denmark	£5,000
Germany and Switzerland	£4,500
South Africa	£4,000
Latin America	£3,500
Russia	£2,500
The Ottoman Empire	£2,000
Other British Dependencies	£2,000
Spain and Portugal	£1,000
Total	£856,500

Large sums of money were donated by charities; the first foreign campaign in December 1845 included the Boston Repeal Association and the Catholic Church. Calcutta is credited with making the first larger donations in 1846, summing up to around £14,000. (Note: equivalent to £1,411,000 in 2025) The money raised included contributions by Irish soldiers serving there and Irish people employed by the East India Company. Russian Tsar Alexander II sent funds and Queen Victoria donated £2,000. (Note: equivalent to £201,584 in 2025) According to legend, Sultan Abdülmecid I of the Ottoman Empire originally offered to send £10,000 (Note: equivalent to £896,957 in 2025) but was asked either by British diplomats or his own ministers to reduce it to £1,000 (Note: equivalent to £89,696 in 2025) to avoid donating more than the Queen. U.S. president James K. Polk donated $50 (Note: equivalent to $1,728 in 2025) and in 1847 Congressman Abraham Lincoln donated $10, (Note: equivalent to $346 in 2025) or £5. (Note: equivalent to £448 in 2025)

International fundraising activities received donations from locations as diverse as Venezuela, Australia, South Africa, Mexico, Russia and Italy. In New Brunswick, at the time a British colony, the House of Assembly voted to donate 1,500 to the British Relief Association.

Pope Pius IX also made a personal contribution of 1,000 Scudi (approximately £213) for famine relief in Ireland and authorized collections in Rome. Most significantly, on 25 March 1847, Pius IX issued the encyclical Praedecessores nostros, which called the whole Catholic world to contribute moneywise and spiritually to Irish relief. Major figures behind international Catholic fundraising for Ireland were the rector of the Pontifical Irish College, Paul Cullen, and the president of the Society of Saint Vincent de Paul, Jules Gossin.

In addition to the religious, non-religious organisations came to the assistance of famine victims. The British Relief Association was the largest of these groups. Founded on 1 January 1847 by Lionel de Rothschild, Abel Smith, and other prominent bankers and aristocrats, the association raised money throughout England, America, and Australia; their funding drive was benefited by a "Queen's Letter", a letter from Queen Victoria appealing for money to relieve the distress in Ireland. With this initial letter, the association raised £171,533. (Note: equivalent to £17,289,000 in 2025) A second, somewhat less successful "Queen's Letter" was issued in late 1847. In total, the association raised approximately £390,000 for Irish relief. (Note: equivalent to £39,309,000 in 2025) Several British relief initiatives, including the British Relief Association, the Queen's Letters, and the governmental soup kitchen programme, were inspired by initiatives originating in Skibbereen, one of the areas hardest hit by the famine during the winter of 1846–47.

Private initiatives such as the Central Relief Committee of the Society of Friends (Quakers) attempted to fill the gap caused by the end of government relief, and eventually, the government reinstated the relief works, although bureaucracy slowed the release of food supplies. Thousands of dollars were raised in the United States, including $170 ($5,218 in 2019 value) collected from a group of Native American Choctaws in 1847. Judy Allen, editor of the Choctaw Nation of Oklahoma's newspaper Biskinik, wrote that "It had been just 16 years since the Choctaw people had experienced the Trail of Tears, and they had faced starvation ... It was an amazing gesture." To mark the 150th anniversary, eight Irish people retraced the Trail of Tears.

Contributions by the United States during the famine were highlighted by Senator Henry Clay who said; "No imagination can conceive—no tongue express—no brush paint—the horrors of the scenes which are daily exhibited in Ireland." He called upon Americans to remind them that the practice of charity was the greatest act of humanity they could do. In total, 118 vessels sailed from the US to Ireland with relief goods valued at $545,145. (Note: equivalent to $19,534,000 in 2025) Specific states which provided aid include South Carolina and Philadelphia, Pennsylvania. Pennsylvania was the second most important state for famine relief in the US and the second-largest shipping port for aid to Ireland. The state hosted the Philadelphia Irish Famine Relief Committee. Catholics, Methodists, Quakers, Presbyterians, Episcopalians, Lutherans, Moravian and Jewish groups put aside their differences in the name of humanity to help the Irish. South Carolina rallied around the efforts to help those experiencing the famine. They raised donations of money, food and clothing to help the victims of the famine—Irish immigrants made up 39% of the white population in the southern cities. Historian Harvey Strum claims that "The states ignored all their racial, religious, and political differences to support the cause for relief."

== Eviction ==
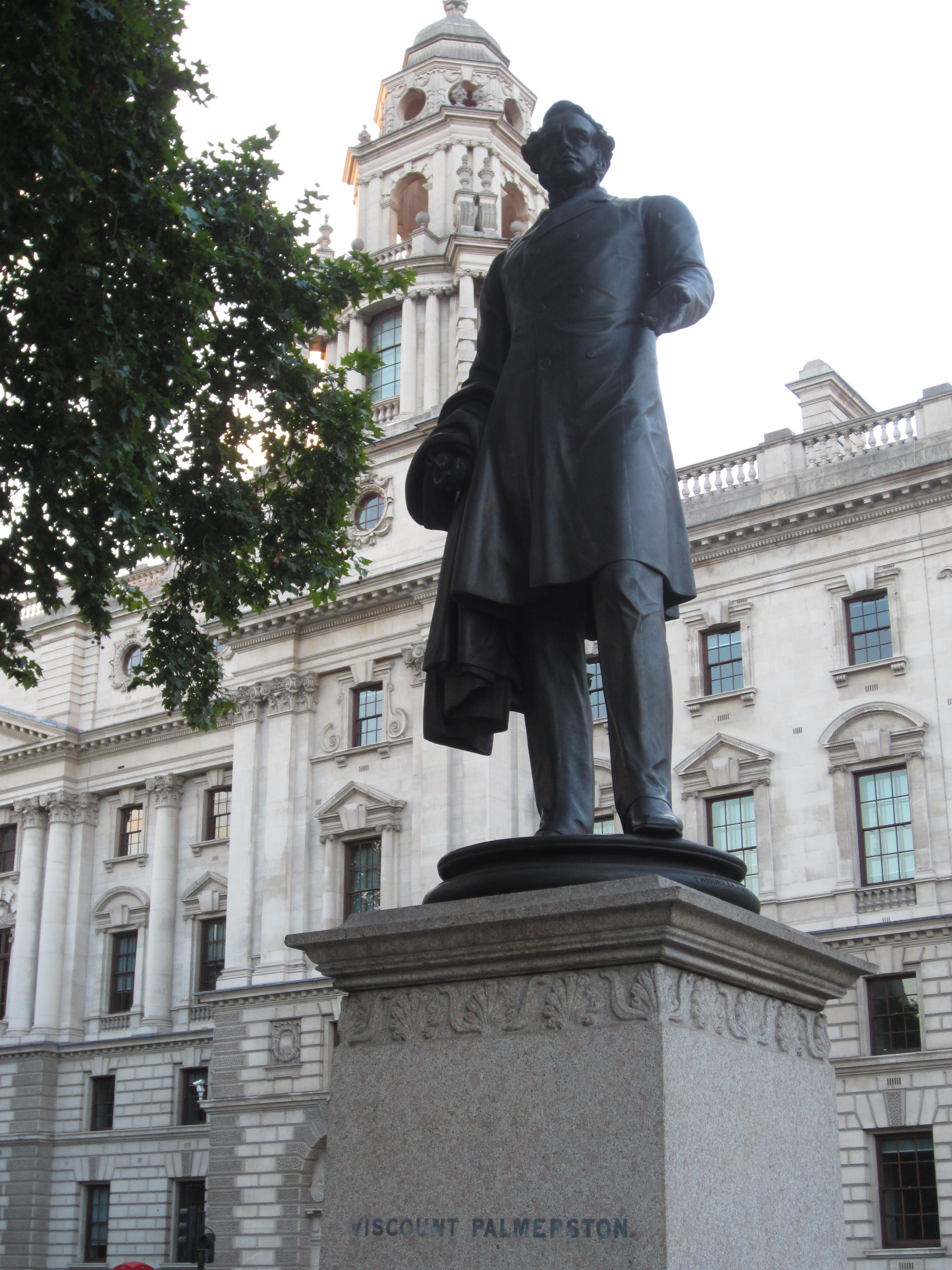
Lord Palmerston, then British Foreign Secretary, evicted some 2,000 of his tenants.

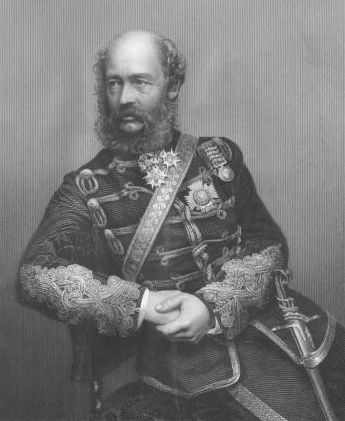
George Bingham, 3rd Earl of Lucan

Landlords were responsible for paying the rates of every tenant whose yearly rent was £4 or less. Landlords whose land was crowded with poorer tenants were now faced with large bills. Many began clearing the poor tenants from their small plots and letting the land in larger plots for over £4 which then reduced their debts. In 1846, there had been some clearances, but the great mass of evictions came in 1847. According to James S. Donnelly Jr., it is impossible to be sure how many people were evicted during the years of the famine and its immediate aftermath. It was only in 1849 that the police began to keep a count, and they recorded a total of almost 250,000 persons as officially evicted between 1849 and 1854.

Donnelly considered this to be an underestimate, and if the figures were to include the number pressured into "voluntary" surrenders during the whole period (1846–1854), the figure would almost certainly exceed half a million persons. While Helen Litton says there were also thousands of "voluntary" surrenders, she notes also that there was "precious little voluntary about them". In some cases, tenants were persuaded to accept a small sum of money to leave their homes, "cheated" into thinking that they would be taken into the workhouses.

West Clare was one of the worst areas for evictions, where landlords turned thousands of families out and demolished their derisory cabins. Captain Kennedy in April 1848 estimated that 1,000 houses, with an average of six people to each, had been levelled since November. The Mahon family of Strokestown House evicted 3,000 people in 1847 and were still able to dine on lobster soup.

After Clare, the worst area for evictions was County Mayo, accounting for 10% of all evictions between 1849 and 1854. George Bingham, 3rd Earl of Lucan, who owned over 60,000 acres (240 km^{2}), was among the worst evicting landlords. He was quoted as saying that "he would not breed paupers to pay priests". Having turned out in the parish of Ballinrobe over 2,000 tenants alone, he then used the cleared land as grazing farms. In 1848, the Marquis of Sligo owed £1,650 to Westport Union; he was also an evicting landlord, though he claimed to be selective, saying that he was only getting rid of the idle and dishonest. Altogether, he cleared about 25% of his tenants.

In 1846 the future Prime Minister of the United Kingdom John Russell, 1st Earl Russell reported that in one year more than 50,000 Irish families had been "turned out of their wretched dwellings without pity and without refuge...we have made it the most degraded and most miserable country in the world...all the world is crying shame upon us."

In 1847, Bishop of Meath, Thomas Nulty, described his personal recollection of the evictions in a pastoral letter to his clergy:

Seven hundred human beings were driven from their homes in one day and set adrift on the world, to gratify the caprice of one who, before God and man, probably deserved less consideration than the last and least of them ... The horrid scenes I then witnessed, I must remember all my life long. The wailing of women—the screams, the terror, the consternation of children—the speechless agony of honest industrious men—wrung tears of grief from all who saw them. I saw officers and men of a large police force, who were obliged to attend on the occasion, cry like children at beholding the cruel sufferings of the very people whom they would be obliged to butcher had they offered the least resistance. The landed proprietors in a circle all around—and for many miles in every direction—warned their tenantry, with threats of their direct vengeance, against the humanity of extending to any of them the hospitality of a single night's shelter ... and in little more than three years, nearly a fourth of them lay quietly in their graves.

The population in Drumbaragh, a townland in County Meath, plummeted 67% between 1841 and 1851; in neighbouring Springville, it fell 54%. There were 50 houses in Springville in 1841 and only 11 left in 1871.

According to Litton, evictions might have taken place earlier but for fear of the secret societies. However, they were now greatly weakened by the Famine. Revenge still occasionally took place, with seven landlords being shot, six fatally, during the autumn and winter of 1847. Ten other occupiers of land, though without tenants, were also murdered, she says.

One such landlord reprisal occurred in West Roscommon. The "notorious" Major Denis Mahon enforced thousands of his tenants into eviction before the end of 1847, with an estimated 60 per cent decline in population in some parishes. He was shot dead in that year. In East Roscommon, "where conditions were more benign", the estimated decline in population was under 10 percent.

Lord Clarendon, alarmed at the number of landlords being shot and that this might mean rebellion, asked for special powers. Lord John Russell was not sympathetic to this appeal. Lord Clarendon believed that landlords themselves were mostly responsible for the tragedy in the first place, saying, "It is quite true that landlords in England would not like to be shot like hares and partridges ... but neither does any landlord in England turn out fifty persons at once and burn their houses over their heads, giving them no provision for the future." The Crime and Outrage Act was passed in December 1847 as a compromise, and additional troops were sent to Ireland.

The "Gregory clause", described by Donnelly as a "vicious amendment to the Irish poor law", had been a successful Tory amendment to the Whig poor-relief bill which became law in early June 1847, where its potential as an estate-clearing device was widely recognised in parliament, although not in advance. At first, the poor law commissioners and inspectors viewed the clause as a valuable instrument for a more cost-effective administration of public relief, but the drawbacks soon became apparent, even from an administrative perspective. They would soon view them as little more than murderous from a humanitarian perspective. According to Donnelly, it became obvious that the quarter-acre clause was "indirectly a death-dealing instrument".

== Emigration ==
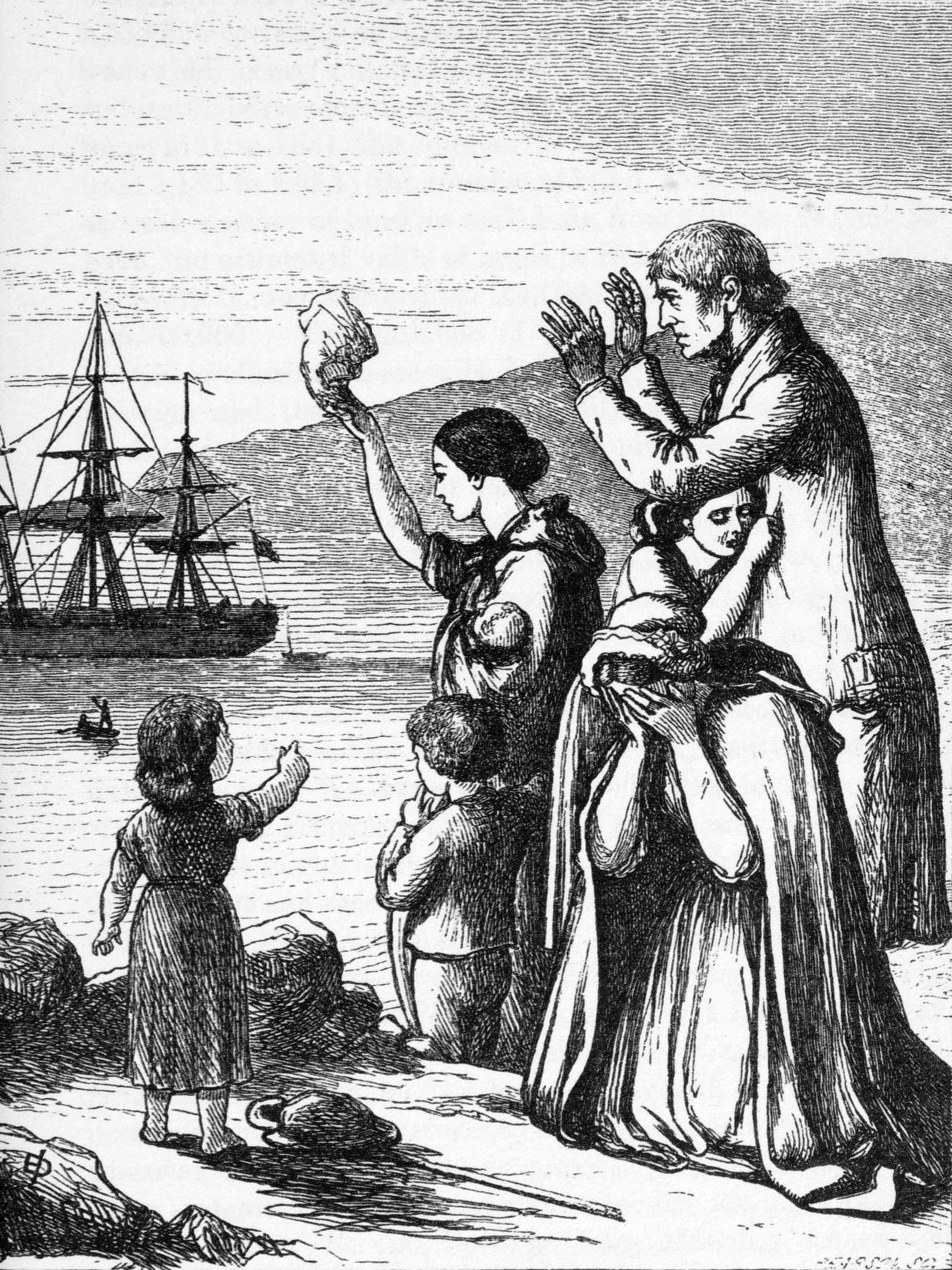
The Emigrants' Farewell, engraving by Henry Doyle (1827–1893), from Mary Frances Cusack's Illustrated History of Ireland, 1868

At least a million people are thought to have emigrated as a result of the famine. There were about a million long-distance emigrants between 1846 and 1851, mainly to North America. The total given in the 1851 census is 967,952. Short-distance emigrants, mainly to Britain, may have numbered 200,000 or more.

While the famine was responsible for a significant increase in emigration from Ireland, of anywhere from 45% to nearly 85% depending on the year and the county, it was not the sole cause. The beginning of mass emigration from Ireland can be traced to the mid-18th century, when some 250,000 people left Ireland over a period of 50 years to settle in the New World. Irish economist Cormac Ó Gráda estimates that between 1 million and 1.5 million people emigrated between 1815 (when Napoleon was defeated in Waterloo) and 1845 (when the Great Famine began). But during the worst of the famine, emigration reached somewhere around 250,000 in one year alone, with western Ireland seeing the most emigrants.

Families did not migrate en masse, but younger members of families did, so much so that emigration almost became a rite of passage, as evidenced by the data that show that, unlike similar emigrations throughout world history, women emigrated just as often, just as early, and in the same numbers as men. The emigrants would send remittances (reaching a total of £1,404,000 by 1851) back to family in Ireland, which, in turn, allowed another member of their family to leave.

Emigration during the famine years of 1845–1850 was primarily to England, Scotland, South Wales, North America, and Australia. Many of those fleeing to the Americas used the McCorkell Line. One city that experienced a particularly strong influx of Irish immigrants was Liverpool, with at least one-quarter of the city's population being Irish-born by 1851. This would heavily influence the city's identity and culture in the coming years, earning it the nickname of "Ireland's second capital". Liverpool became the only place outside of Ireland to elect an Irish nationalist to parliament when it elected T. P. O'Connor in 1885, and continuously re-elected him unopposed until his death in 1929. As of 2020, it is estimated that three quarters of people from the city have Irish ancestry.

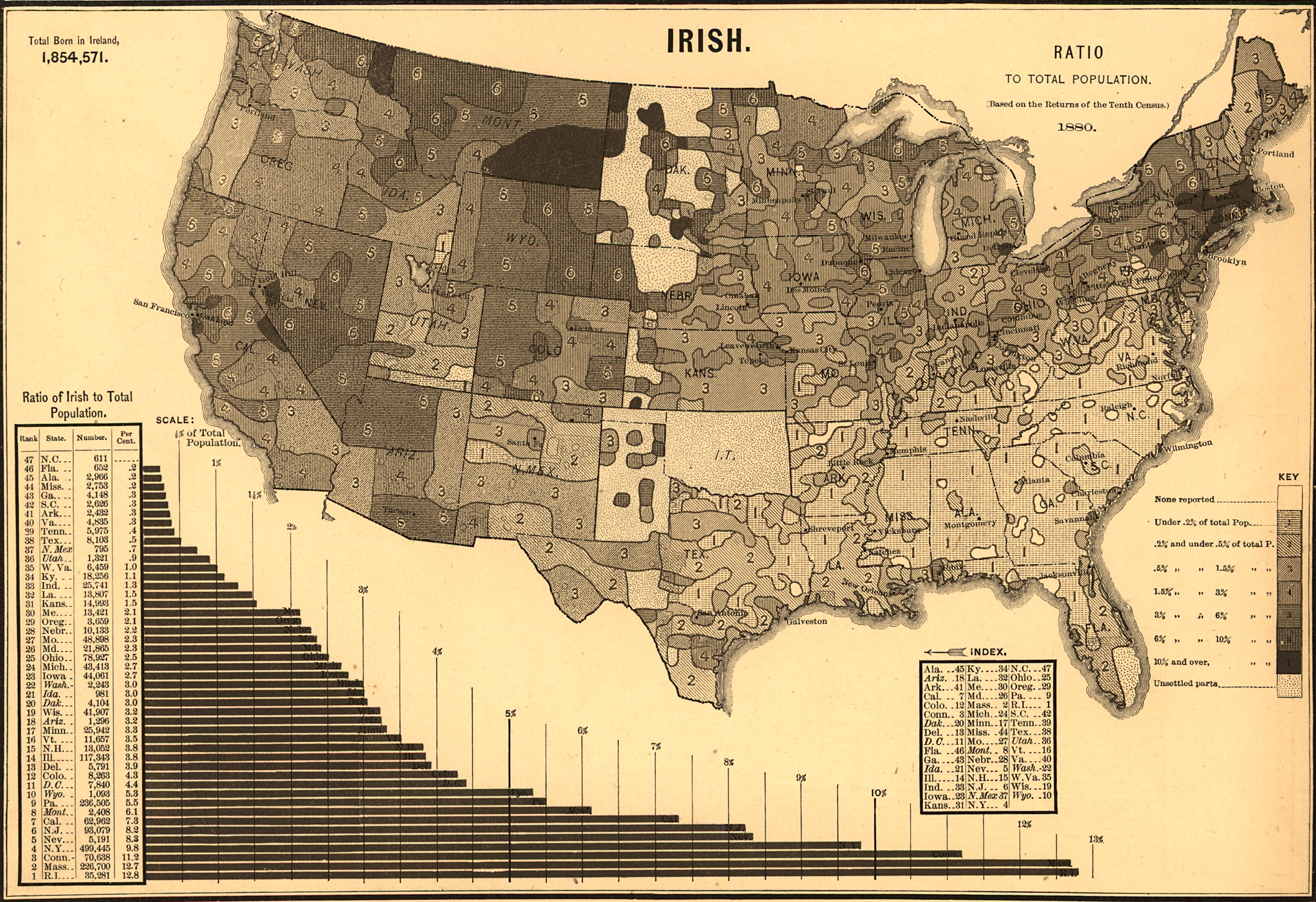
Irish population in the United States, 1880

Of the more than 100,000 Irish who sailed to Canada in 1847, an estimated one in five died from disease and malnutrition, including over 5,000 at Grosse Isle, Quebec, an island in the Saint Lawrence River used to quarantine ships near Quebec City. Overcrowded, poorly maintained, and badly provisioned vessels known as coffin ships sailed from small, unregulated harbours in the West of Ireland in contravention of British safety requirements, and mortality rates were high. The 1851 census reported that more than half the inhabitants of Toronto were Irish, and, in 1847 alone, 38,000 Irish flooded a city with fewer than 20,000 citizens. Other Canadian cities such as Quebec City, Montreal, Ottawa, Kingston, Hamilton, and Saint John also received large numbers. By 1871, 55% of Saint John residents were Irish natives or children of Irish-born parents. Unlike the United States, Canada could not close its ports to Irish ships because it was part of the British Empire, so emigrants could obtain cheap passage in returning empty lumber holds.

In America, most Irish became city-dwellers; with little money, many had to settle in the cities that the ships they came on landed in. By 1850, the Irish made up a quarter of the population in Boston, New York City, Philadelphia, and Baltimore.

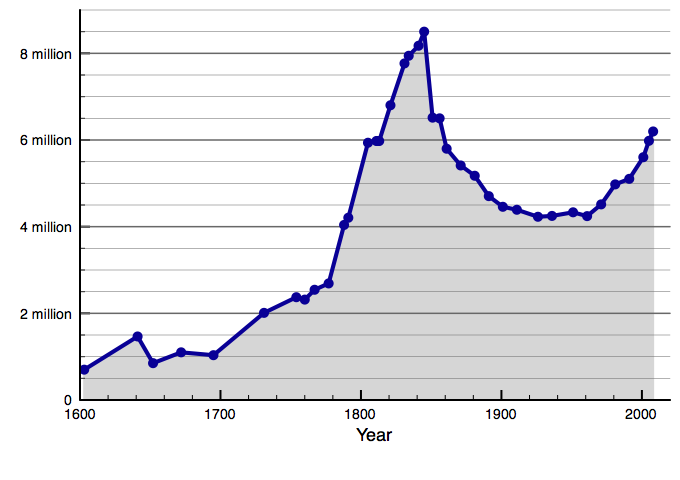
Irish population 1600–2010. Note the decrease beginning in 1845, which did not recover until the 21st century.

The famine marked the beginning of the depopulation of Ireland in the 19th century. The population had increased by 13–14% in the first three decades of the 19th century; between 1831 and 1841, the population grew by 5%. Application of Thomas Malthus's idea of population expanding geometrically while resources increase arithmetically was popular during the famines of 1817 and 1822. By the 1830s, they were seen as overly simplistic, and Ireland's problems were seen "less as an excess of population than as a lack of capital investment". Ireland's population was growing no faster than that of England, which suffered no equivalent catastrophe. By 1854, between 1.5 and 2 million Irish left their country due to evictions, starvation, and harsh living conditions.

== Death toll ==
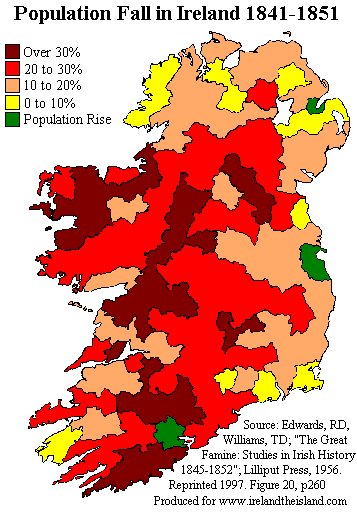

It is not known exactly how many people died during the famine, though it is believed that more died from disease than starvation. State registration of births, marriages, or deaths had not yet begun, and records kept by the Catholic Church are incomplete, while the pre-20th century Court, Probate, Census, Tax, and Church of Ireland registers, were in part destroyed in 1922. (Note: Civil registration of births and deaths in Ireland was not established by law until 1863.) One estimate has been reached by comparing the expected population with the eventual numbers in the 1850s. A census taken in 1841 recorded a population of 8,175,124. A census immediately after the famine in 1851 counted 6,552,385, a drop of over 1.5 million in 10 years. The census commissioners estimated that, at the 19th-century rate of population growth, the population in 1851 could have grown to just over 9 million if the famine had not occurred.

On the in-development Great Irish Famine Online resource, produced by the Geography department of University College Cork, the population of Ireland section states that together with the census figures being called low, before the famine it reads that "it is now generally believed" that over 8.75 million people populated the island of Ireland prior to it striking.

In 1851, the census commissioners collected information on the number who died in each family since 1841, and the cause, season, and year of death. They recorded 21,770 total deaths from starvation in the previous decade and 400,720 deaths from diseases. Listed diseases were fever, diphtheria, dysentery, cholera, smallpox, and influenza, with the first two being the main killers (222,021 and 93,232). The commissioners acknowledged that their figures were incomplete and that the true number of deaths was probably higher:

The greater the amount of destitution of mortality ... the less will be the amount of recorded deaths derived through any household form;—for not only were whole families swept away by disease ... but whole villages were effaced from off the land.

Later historians agree that the 1851 death tables "were flawed and probably under-estimated the level of mortality". The combination of institutional and figures provided by individuals gives "an incomplete and biased count" of fatalities during the famine. Cormac Ó Gráda, referencing the work of W. A. MacArthur, writes that specialists have long known that the Irish death tables were inaccurate, and undercounted the number of deaths.

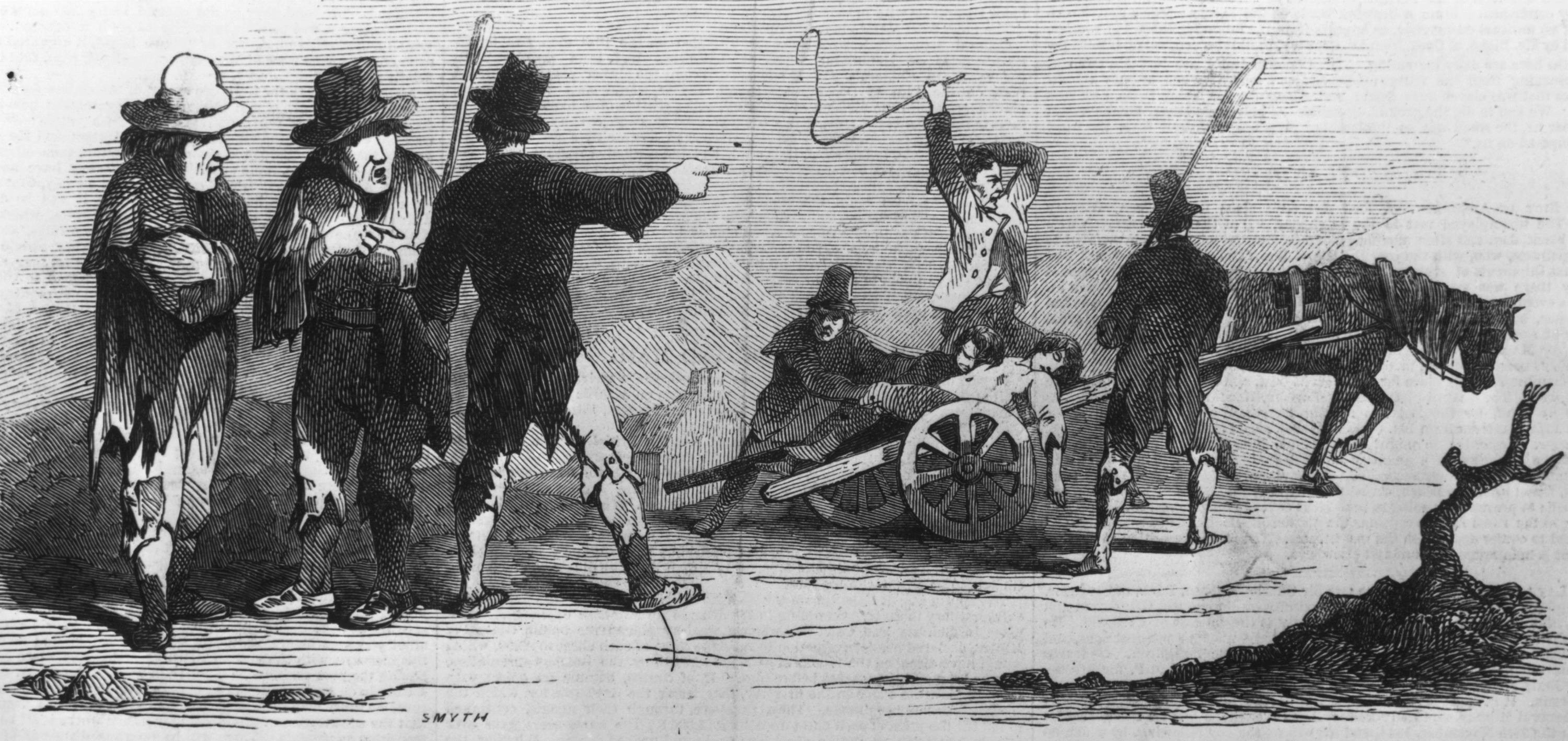
An 1847 engraving depicting a funeral in Skibbereen during the height of the Great Famine

S. H. Cousens's estimate of 800,000 deaths relied heavily on retrospective information contained in the 1851 census and elsewhere, and is now regarded as too low. Modern historian J. J. Lee says "at least 800,000", and R. F. Foster estimates that "at least 775,000 died, mostly through disease, including cholera in the latter stages of the holocaust". He further notes that "a recent sophisticated computation estimates excess deaths from 1846 to 1851 as between 1,000,000 and 1,500,000 ... after a careful critique of this, other statisticians arrive at a figure of 1,000,000". (Note: "Based on hitherto unpublished work by C. Ó Gráda and Phelim Hughes, 'Fertility trends, excess mortality and the Great Irish Famine' ... Also see Cormac Ó Gráda and Joel Mokyr, 'New developments in Irish Population History 1700–1850', Economic History Review, vol. xxxvii, no. 4 (November 1984), pp. 473–488.")

Joel Mokyr's estimates at an aggregated county level range from 1.1 to 1.5 million deaths between 1846 and 1851. Mokyr produced two sets of data which contained an upper-bound and lower-bound estimate, which showed not much difference in regional patterns. The true figure is likely to lie between the two extremes of half and one and a half million, and the most widely accepted estimate is one million.

Decline in population 1841–1851 (%)
Leinster	Munster	Ulster	Connacht	Ireland
15.3	22.5	15.7	28.8	20

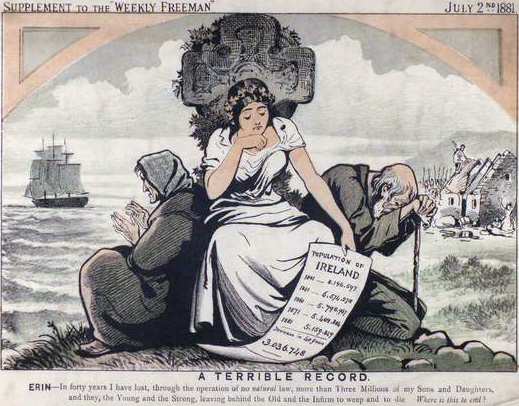
Political cartoon from the 1880s: "In forty years I have lost, through the operation of no natural law, more than Three Million of my Sons and Daughters, and they, the Young and the Strong, leaving behind the Old and Infirm to weep and to die. Where is this to end?"

Another area of uncertainty lies in the descriptions of disease given by tenants as to the cause of their relatives' deaths. Though the 1851 census has been rightly criticised as underestimating the true extent of mortality, it does provide a framework for the medical history of the Great Famine. The diseases that badly affected the population fell into two categories: famine-induced diseases and diseases of nutritional deficiency. Of the nutritional deficiency diseases, the most commonly experienced were starvation and marasmus, as well as a condition at the time called dropsy. Dropsy (oedema) was a popular name given for the symptoms of several diseases, one of which, kwashiorkor, is associated with starvation.

The greatest mortality was not from nutritional deficiency diseases but from famine-induced ailments. The malnourished are very vulnerable to infections; therefore, these were more severe when they occurred. Measles, diphtheria, diarrhoea, tuberculosis, most respiratory infections, whooping cough, many intestinal parasites, and cholera were all strongly conditioned by nutritional status. Potentially lethal diseases, such as smallpox and influenza, were so virulent that their spread was independent of nutrition. The best example of this phenomenon was fever, which exacted the greatest death toll. In the popular mind, as well as medical opinion, fever and famine were closely related. Social dislocation—the congregation of the hungry at soup kitchens, food depots, and overcrowded workhouses—created conditions that were ideal for spreading infectious diseases such as typhus, typhoid, and relapsing fever.

Diarrhoeal diseases were the result of poor hygiene, bad sanitation, and dietary changes. The concluding attack on a population incapacitated by famine was delivered by Asiatic cholera, which had visited Ireland briefly in the 1830s. In the following decade, it spread uncontrollably across Asia, through Europe, and into Britain, finally reaching Ireland in 1849. Some scholars estimate that the population of Ireland was reduced by 20–25%.

== After the famine ==
Ireland's mean age of marriage in 1830 was 23.8 for women and 27.5 for men, where they had once been 21 for women and 25 for men, and those who never married numbered about 10% of the population; in 1840, they had respectively risen to 24.4 and 27.7. In the decades after the Famine, the age of marriage had risen to 28–29 for women and 33 for men, and as many as a third of Irishmen and a quarter of Irishwomen never married, due to low wages and chronic economic problems that discouraged early and universal marriage.

A 2025 anthropometric study of more than 14,500 individuals born before, during and after the Famine examined the long-term health of famine survivors and found that in areas with the highest famine-period excess mortality, selection effects were strong enough that surviving cohorts did not display the expected stunting in adult stature, suggesting that excess mortality and migration among the most vulnerable partially offset the “scarring” impact of early-life famine exposure.

One consequence of the increase in the number of orphaned children was that some young women turned to prostitution to provide for themselves. Some of the women who became Wrens of the Curragh were famine orphans.

The potato blight would return to Ireland in 1879, though by then the rural cottier tenant farmers and labourers of Ireland had begun the "Land War", described as one of the largest agrarian movements to take place in nineteenth-century Europe.

By the time the potato blight returned in 1879, The Land League, which was led by Michael Davitt, who was born during the Great Famine and whose family had been evicted when Davitt was only 4 years old, encouraged the mass boycott of "notorious landlords" with some members also physically blocking evictions. The policy, however, would soon be suppressed. Close to 1000 people were interned under the 1881 Coercion Act for suspected membership. With the reduction in the rate of homelessness and the increased physical and political networks eroding the landlordism system, the severity of the following shorter famine would be limited.

According to the linguist Erick Falc'her-Poyroux, surprisingly, for a country renowned for its rich musical heritage, only a small number of folk songs can be traced back to the demographic and cultural catastrophe brought about by the Great Famine, and he infers from this that the subject was generally avoided for decades among poorer people as it brought back too many sorrowful memories. Also, large areas of the country became uninhabited and the folk song collectors of the 18th and 19th centuries did not collect the songs they heard in the Irish language, as the language of the peasantry was often regarded as dead, or "not delicate enough for educated ears". Of the songs that have survived probably the best known is Skibbereen. Emigration has been an important source of inspiration for songs of the Irish during the 20th century.

== Analysis of the government's role ==
=== Contemporary analysis ===
Contemporary opinion was sharply critical of the Russell government's response to and management of the crisis. From the start, there were accusations that the government failed to grasp the magnitude of the disaster. Sir James Graham, who had served as Home Secretary in Sir Robert Peel's late government, wrote to Peel that, in his opinion, "the real extent and magnitude of the Irish difficulty are underestimated by the Government, and cannot be met by measures within the strict rule of economical science".

This criticism was not confined to outside critics. The Lord-Lieutenant of Ireland, Lord Clarendon, wrote a letter to Russell on 26 April 1849, urging that the government propose additional relief measures: "I don't think there is another legislature in Europe that would disregard such suffering as now exists in the west of Ireland, or coldly persist in a policy of extermination." Also in 1849, the Chief Poor Law Commissioner, Edward Twisleton, resigned in protest over the Rate-in-Aid Act, which provided additional funds for the Poor Law through a 6d in the pound levy on all rateable properties in Ireland. Twisleton testified that "comparatively trifling sums were required for Britain to spare itself the deep disgrace of permitting its miserable fellow-subjects to die of starvation". According to Peter Gray in his book The Irish Famine, the government spent £7 million for relief in Ireland between 1845 and 1850, "representing less than half of one per cent of the British gross national product over five years. Contemporaries noted the sharp contrast with the £20 million compensation given to West Indian slave-owners in the 1830s."

Other critics maintained that, even after the government recognised the scope of the crisis, it failed to take sufficient steps to address it. John Mitchel, one of the leaders of the Young Ireland Movement, wrote in 1860:

I have called it an artificial famine: that is to say, it was a famine which desolated a rich and fertile island that produced every year abundance and superabundance to sustain all her people and many more. The English, indeed, call the famine a "dispensation of Providence"; and ascribe it entirely to the blight on potatoes. But potatoes failed in like manner all over Europe, yet there was no famine save in Ireland. The British account of the matter, then, is first, a fraud; second, a blasphemy. The Almighty, indeed, sent the potato blight, but the English created the famine.

Still, other critics saw reflected in the government's response its attitude to the so-called "Irish Question". Nassau Senior, an economics professor at Oxford University, wrote that the Famine "would not kill more than one million people, and that would scarcely be enough to do any good". In 1848, Denis Shine Lawlor suggested that Russell was a student of the Elizabethan poet Edmund Spenser, who had calculated "how far English colonisation and English policy might be most effectively carried out by Irish starvation". Charles Trevelyan, the civil servant with most direct responsibility for the government's handling of the famine, described it in 1848 as "a direct stroke of an all-wise and all-merciful Providence", which laid bare "the deep and inveterate root of social evil"; he affirmed that the Famine was "the sharp but effectual remedy by which the cure is likely to be effected. God grant that the generation to which this opportunity has been offered may rightly perform its part..."

=== Historical analysis ===
Christine Kinealy has written that "the major tragedy of the Irish Famine of 1845–1852 marked a watershed in modern Irish history. Its occurrence, however, was neither inevitable nor unavoidable". The underlying factors which combined to cause the famine were aggravated by an inadequate government response. Kinealy notes that the "government had to do something to help alleviate the suffering" but that "it became apparent that the government was using its information not merely to help it formulate its relief policies, but also as an opportunity to facilitate various long-desired changes within Ireland".

Joel Mokyr writes, "There is no doubt that Britain could have saved Ireland" and compares the £9.5 million the government spent on famine relief in Ireland to the £63.9 million it spent a few years later on the "utterly futile" Crimean War. Mokyr argues that, despite its formal integration into the United Kingdom, Ireland was effectively a foreign country to the British, who were therefore unwilling to spend resources that could have saved hundreds of thousands of lives.

Some also pointed to the structure of the British Empire as a contributing factor. James Anthony Froude wrote, "England governed Ireland for what she deemed her own interest, making her calculations on the gross balance of her trade ledgers, and leaving moral obligations aside, as if right and wrong had been blotted out of the statute book of the Universe." Dennis Clark, an Irish-American historian and critic of empire, claimed the famine was "the culmination of generations of neglect, misrule and repression. It was an epic of English colonial cruelty and inadequacy. For the landless cabin dwellers, it meant emigration or extinction..."

=== Position of the British government ===
The British government has not expressly apologized for its role in the famine. But in 1997, at a commemoration event in County Cork, the actor Gabriel Byrne read out a message by Prime Minister Tony Blair that acknowledged the inadequacy of the government response. It asserted that "those who governed in London at the time failed their people through standing by while a crop failure turned into a massive human tragedy". The message was well received by the Irish media, where it was understood as the long-sought British apology. Archive documents released in 2021 showed that the message was not in fact written or approved by Blair, who could not be reached by aides at the time. It was therefore approved by Blair's principal private secretary John Holmes on his own initiative.

=== Genocide question ===
While the majority of historians of the subject reject the claim that the British government's response to the famine constituted a genocide, the question remains in public discourse. Those who don't view it as genocide generally argue that with regard to famine related deaths, there seems to have been a lack of intent to commit genocide. They also argue that although contemporary commentators blamed the mass death on the actions of the British government, rather than the blight, for a mass-death atrocity to be defined as a genocide, it must include the intentional destruction of a people.

In 1996, the U.S. state of New Jersey included the famine in the "Holocaust and Genocide Curriculum" of its secondary schools. (Note: Approved by the New Jersey Commission on Holocaust Education on 10 September 1996, for inclusion in the Holocaust and Genocide Curriculum at the secondary level. Revision submitted 11/26/98.) In the 1990s, Irish-American lobbying groups campaigned vigorously to include the study of the Irish Famine in school curriculums, alongside studies of the Holocaust, slavery and other similar atrocities. The New Jersey curriculum was pushed by such lobbying groups and was drafted by the librarian James Mullin. Following criticism, the New Jersey Holocaust Commission requested statements from two academics that the Irish famine was genocide, which was eventually provided by law professors Charles E. Rice and Francis Boyle, who had not been previously known for studying Irish history. They concluded that the British government deliberately pursued a race- and ethnicity-based policy aimed at destroying the Irish people and that the policy of mass starvation amounted to genocide per retrospective application of article 2 of the Hague Convention of 1948. (Note: "Clearly, during the years 1845 to 1850, the British government pursued a policy of mass starvation in Ireland with intent to destroy in substantial part the national, ethnic and racial group commonly known as the Irish People ... Therefore, during the years 1845 to 1850 the British government knowingly pursued a policy of mass starvation in Ireland that constituted acts of genocide against the Irish people within the meaning of Article II (c) of the 1948 [Hague] Genocide Convention.")

American Historian Donald Akenson, who has written 24 books on Ireland, said, "When you see [the word Holocaust used with regard to the Great Famine], you know that you are encountering famine-porn. It is inevitably part of a presentation that is historically unbalanced and, like other kinds of pornography, is distinguished by a covert (and sometimes overt) appeal to misanthropy and almost always an incitement to hatred."

Irish historian Cormac Ó Gráda rejected the claim that the British government's response to the famine was a genocide and said, "no academic historian continues to take the claim of 'genocide' seriously". He argued that "genocide includes murderous intent, and it must be said that not even the most bigoted and racist commentators of the day sought the extermination of the Irish". He also said that most people in Whitehall "hoped for better times for Ireland" and that the claim of genocide overlooks "the enormous challenge facing relief agencies, both central and local, public and private". Ó Gráda thinks that a case of neglect is easier to sustain than a case of genocide.

John Leazer, professor of history at Carthage College, Wisconsin, wrote that the binary framing of the debate about the British government's, and particularly Trevelyan's, actions as being good or bad is "unsatisfactory" and that the entire debate surrounding the question of genocide serves to oversimplify and obfuscate complex factors behind the actions of the government as a whole and individuals within it.

Writing in 2008, historian Robbie Mcveigh highlighted that while discussions around whether the Great Irish Famine was genocidal in nature have a long history, the tools of genocide analysis were never employed to assess such claims. Scholars highlight the similarity of British policies around and in response to the Irish famine and other cases of famine and starvation in the British empire and colonial regimes, with Mcveigh stating in the other cases they "appear not as horrendous imperial incompetence but rather a deliberate administrative policy of genocide", and calls for more rigorous investigation of the history of Ireland in genocide studies. There have been later genocide scholars who support the description of the famine as a genocide. Neysa King has characterised specifically the relief efforts of the Russell administration from late 1846 to 1849 as genocide, while acknowledging the roots of the famine lay elsewhere. Nat Hill, director of research at Genocide Watch, has said, "While the potato famine may not fit perfectly into the legal and political definitions of 'genocide', it should be given equal consideration in history as an egregious crime against humanity".

== Memorials ==
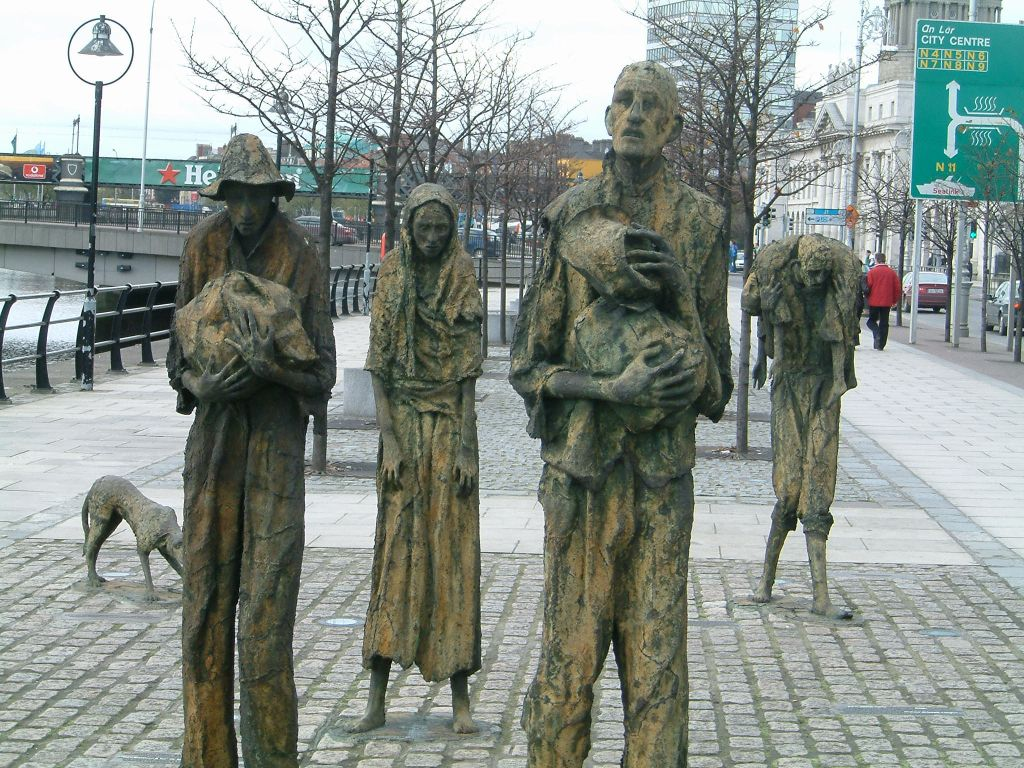
Famine Memorial in Dublin

Ireland's National Famine Memorial is situated in Murrisk Millennium Peace Park, a five-acre park overlooking the Atlantic Ocean in the village of Murrisk, County Mayo at the foot of Croagh Patrick mountain. Designed by Irish artist John Behan, the memorial consists of a bronze sculpture of a coffin ship with skeletons interwoven through the rigging symbolising the many emigrants that did not survive the journey across the ocean to Britain, America and elsewhere. It was unveiled on 20 July 1997 by then-President Mary Robinson. The Famine Commemoration Committee who led the project chose the site in Murrisk as they felt it was "entirely fitting that the national famine memorial [..] be located in the west, which suffered most during the Famine with one in four of the population of Connaught dying in those terrible years."

The National Famine Commemoration Day is observed annually in Ireland, usually on a Sunday in May.

It is also memorialized in many locations throughout Ireland, especially in those regions of Ireland which suffered the greatest losses, and it is also memorialized overseas, particularly in cities with large populations descended from Irish immigrants, such as New York City. Among the memorials in the US is the Irish Hunger Memorial near a section of the Manhattan waterfront.

Kindred Spirits, a large stainless steel sculpture of nine eagle feathers by artist Alex Pentek was erected in 2017 in the Irish town of Midleton, County Cork, to thank the Choctaw people for its financial assistance during the famine.

An annual Great Famine walk from Doolough to Louisburgh, County Mayo was inaugurated in 1988 and has been led by such notable personalities as Archbishop Desmond Tutu of South Africa and representatives of the Choctaw nation of Oklahoma. The walk, organised by Afri, takes place on the first or second Saturday of May and links the memory of the famine with contemporary human rights issues.

In 1994, Sinead O'Connor released "Famine," about historical representations of the Famine and the role of the English government. She performed the song on Later ... with Jools Holland in 1996.

== See also ==
- Agriculture in Ireland
- Great Famine's effect on the American economy
- Highland Potato Famine (an agrarian crisis which occurred in Scotland at the same time)
- Irish Famine (1740–1741)
- Irish Famine (1879)
- List of famines
- Charles Wood, 1st Viscount Halifax#Role in the Irish Famine
