= Historical population of Ireland =

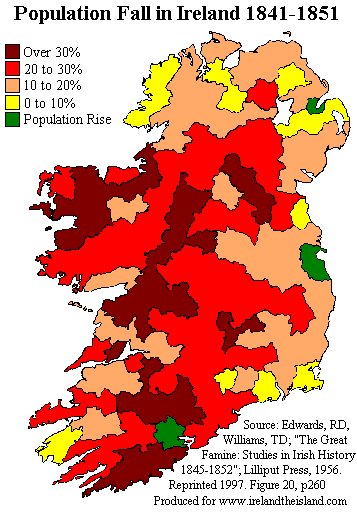
Ireland population change 1841–1851

The population of Ireland in 2021 was approximately seven million with 1,903,100 in Northern Ireland and 5,123,536 in the Republic of Ireland. In the 2022 census the population of the Republic of Ireland eclipsed five million for the first time since the 1851 census. The population of Ireland in 2024 was approximately 7.2 million (5.35 million in the Republic of Ireland and 1.91 million in Northern Ireland). Although these figures demonstrate significant growth over recent years, the population of Ireland remains below the record high of 8,175,124 in the 1841 census.

Between 1700 and 1840, Ireland experienced rapid population growth, rising from less than three million in 1700 to over eight million by the 1841 census. In 1851, at the end of the Great Famine, the population of Ireland had dropped to 6.5 million people. The Famine and the resulting Irish diaspora had a dramatic effect on population; by 1891, Ireland's population had slipped under five million and by 1931, it had dropped to just over four million. It stayed around this level until the 1960s, when the population rose again.

Below are some statistics to illustrate the rise, fall and rise again of the population since 1841. The statistics also illustrate a massive population shift from the west to the east of the country and increasing urbanisation. The areas around Dublin and Belfast have seen population growth, while Connacht has become depopulated.

== Historical population ==
Year	Population	%Change	Av % per year
2022	7.1m	▲6.6	▲1.1
2016	6.66m	▲4.2	▲0.84
2011	6.39m	▲6.86	▲1.37
2006	5.98m	▲6.6	▲1.32
2001	5.6m	▲6.1	▲1.21
1996	5.29m	▲3.5	▲0.7
1991	5.2m	Steady	Steady
1986	5.1m	▲2.2	▲0.44
1981	5m	▲10.86	▲1.09
1971	4.51m	▲3.44	▲0.69
1966	4.36m	▲2.59	▲0.52
1961	4.25m	▼0.93	▼0.19
1956	4.29m	▼0.19	▼0.1
1951	4.33m	▲0.93	▲1.86
1946	4.29m	▲1.9	▲0.1
1931	4.21m	▼0.47	▼0.09
1926	4.23m	▼3.42	▼0.23
1911	4.38m	▼1.79	▼0.18
1901	4.46m	▼5.11	▼0.51
1891	4.7m	▼9.27	▼0.93
1881	5.18m	▼4.07	▼0.4
1871	5.4m	▼6.9	▼0.69
1861	5.8m	▼11.45	▼1.15
1851	6.55m	▼19.93	▼1.99
1841	8.18m	▲2.89	▲0.41
1834	7.95m	▲2.32	▲0.77
1831	7.77m	▲14.26	▲1.43
1821	6.8m	▲22.08	▲1.47
1806	5.57m	▲17.26	▲1.15
1791	4.75m	▲17.28	▲1.73
1781	4.05m	▲26.56	▲0.98
1754	3.2m	▲10.3	▲0.29
1718	2.9m	▲107	▲0.907
1600	1.4m	▲75	▲0.75
1500	800k		

In 2016, the population of Ireland for the first time exceeded the population recorded in the Census of 1851, the first census immediately after the Great Famine, when the population of the island was recorded at 6,575,000.

== County populations 2016 ==
Rank	County	Population	Density (/ km^{2})	Province	Change since previous census
1	Dublin	1,347,359	1,459.2	Leinster	▲5.7%
2	Antrim	618,108	202.9	Ulster	▲1.8%
3	Cork	542,868	72.3	Munster	▲4.5%
4	Down	531,665	215.6	Ulster	▲8.7%
-	Fingal	296,020	651.6	Leinster	▲8.1%
-	South Dublin	278,767	1,251.5	Leinster	▲5.1%
5	Galway	258,058	42.0	Connacht	▲3.2%
6	Londonderry	247,132	119.1	Ulster	▲4.8%
7	Kildare	222,504	131.0	Leinster	▲5.6%
-	Dún Laoghaire–Rathdown	218,018	1,706.7	Leinster	▲5.3%
8	Meath	195,044	83.2	Leinster	▲5.9%
9	Limerick	194,899	70.8	Munster	▲1.8%
10	Tyrone	179,000	54.5	Ulster	▲8.4%
11	Armagh	174,792	131.8	Ulster	▲7.3%
12	Tipperary	159,553	37.2	Munster	▲1.1%
13	Donegal	159,192	32.6	Ulster	▼ -1.5%
14	Wexford	149,722	63.2	Leinster	▲2.9%
15	Kerry	147,707	30.7	Munster	▲1.4%
16	Wicklow	142,425	70.2	Leinster	▲4.2%
17	Mayo	130,507	23.3	Connacht	▼ -0.2%
18	Louth	128,884	155.4	Leinster	▲4.5%
19	Clare	118,817	34.4	Munster	▲1.2%
20	Waterford	116,176	62.7	Munster	▲2.3%
21	Kilkenny	99,232	47.8	Leinster	▲3.9%
22	Westmeath	88,770	48.2	Leinster	▲2.9%
23	Laois	84,697	49.3	Leinster	▲5.2%
24	Offaly	77,961	38.9	Leinster	▲1.7%
25	Cavan	76,176	39.3	Ulster	▲4.0%
26	Sligo	65,535	35.5	Connacht	▼ -0.1%
27	Roscommon	64,544	25.3	Connacht	▲0.6%
28	Monaghan	61,386	47.3	Ulster	▲1.3%
29	Fermanagh	61,170	36.1	Ulster	▲6.3%
30	Carlow	56,932	63.4	Leinster	▲4.1%
31	Longford	40,873	37.4	Leinster	▲4.6%
32	Leitrim	32,044	20.1	Connacht	▲0.5%
	Average	205,429			
	Northern Ireland total	1,811,867	133		
	Republic of Ireland total	4,761,865	70		
Total		6,573,732	77.8		

== Historical populations per province ==
(Measured in 1000s, rounded)

=== Leinster ===
Year	2022	2016	2011	2006	2002	1996	1991	1986	1981	1979	1971	1966	1961	1956	1951	1946	1936	1926	1911	1901	1891	1881	1871	1861	1851	1841
Population	2,876	2,631	2,501	2,292	2,103	1,920	1,858	1,851	1,789	1,741	1,495	1,413	1,330	1,336	1,336	1,278	1,217	1,147	1,160	1,152	1,186	1,276	1,336	1,454	1,668	1,969
Rank	1	1	1	1	1	1	1	1	1	1	1	1	1	1	1	1	1	1	1	1	1	2	2	2	2	2
%Change	9	5.2	9	9	9.53	3.34	0.38	3.47	2.76	16.45	5.8	6.24	-(0.45)	0	4.54	5.01	6.10	-(1.12)	0.69	-(2.87)	-(7.05)	-(4.49)	-(8.12)	-(12.83)	-(15.29)	

=== Munster ===
Year	2022	2016	2011	2006	2002	1996	1991	1986	1981	1979	1971	1966	1961	1956	1951	1946	1936	1926	1911	1901	1891	1881	1871	1861	1851	1841
Population	1,373	1,280	1,244	1,173	1,098	1,032	1,004	1,018	996	978	879	856	847	874	897	914	940	968	1,033	1,073	1,169	1,328	1,390	1,510	1,856	2,396
Rank	2	2	2	2	2	2	2	2	2	2	2	2	2	2	2	2	2	2	2	2	2	1	1	1	1	1
%Change	7.4	2.9	6.0	6.83	6.4	2.79	-(1.38)	2.21	1.84	11.26	2.69	1.06	-(3.09)	-(2.56)	-(1.86)	-(2.77)	-(2.89)	-(6.29)	-(3.73)	-(8.21)	-(11.97)	-(4.46)	-(7.95)	-(18.64)	-(22.47)	

=== Connacht ===
Year	2022	2016	2011	2006	2002	1996	1991	1986	1981	1979	1971	1966	1961	1956	1951	1946	1936	1926	1911	1901	1891	1881	1871	1861	1851	1841
Population	591	551	542	504	464	431	421	431	424	418	390	401	418	446	471	493	525	552	611	646	724	820	846	911	1,008	1,419
Rank	3	3	3	3	3	3	3	3	3	3	3	3	3	3	3	3	3	3	3	3	3	3	3	3	3	4
%Change	7.2	1.7	7.5	8.62	7.66	2.38	-(2.32)	1.65	1.44	7.18	-(2.74)	-(4.07)	-(6.28)	-(5.31)	-(4.46)	-(6.10)	-(4.89)	-(9.66)	-(5.42)	-(10.77)	-(11.71)	-(3.07)	-(7.14)	-(9.62)	-(28.86)	

=== Ulster ===
Figures not in bold are for the Republic of Ireland counties of Ulster only. Figures in bold are for the whole of Ulster.

Year	2022	2016	2011	2006	2002	1996	1991	1986	1981	1979	1971	1966	1961	1956	1951	1946	1936	1926	1911	1901	1891	1881	1871	1861	1851	1841	
Population	**2,195**	296	**2,106**	296	267	247	233	232	236	230	226	207	209	218	236	253	263	280	300	331	347	385	438	474	517	571	**2,386**
Rank	**2**	4	**2**	4	4	4	4	4	4	4	4	4	4	4	4	4	4	4	4	4	4	4	4	4	4	**2**	
%Change	4.2	10.2	10.1	8.1	6.01	0.43	-(1.69)	2.61	1.77	9.18	-(0.96)	-(4.13)	-(7.63)	-(6.72)	-(3.80)	-(6.07)	-(6.67)	-(9.37)	-(4.61)	-(9.87)	-(12.10)	-(7.59)	-(8.32)	-(9.46)			

== Historical populations per county ==
(Measured in 1000s)

=== Dublin ===
Year	2022	2016	2011	2006	2002	1996	1991	1986	1981	1979	1971	1966	1961	1956	1951	1946	1931	1928	1911	1901	1891	1881	1871	1861	1851	1841
Population	1,458	1,345	1,271	1,186	1,122	1,058	1,025	1,021	1,003	983	852	795	718	705	693	636	586	505	477	448	419	418	405	410	405	372
Rank	1	1	1	1	1	1	1	1	1	1	1	1	1	1	1	1	1	1	1	1	2	2	2	2	2	5
%Change	7.8	5.8	7.0	5.7	6.05	3.22	0.39	1.8	2.04	15.37	7.17	10.72	1.84	1.73	8.96	8.53	16.04	5.87	6.47	6.92	0.24	3.21	(1.22)	1.23	8.87	

=== Antrim ===
Year	2021	2016	2011	2006	2002	1996	1991	1986	1981	1979	1971	1966	1961	1956	1951	1946	1936	1926	1911	1901	1891	1881	1871	1861	1851	1841
Population	651		618																							
Rank	2		2																							
%Change	5.5																									

=== Down ===
Year	2021	2016	2011	2006	2002	1996	1991	1986	1981	1979	1971	1966	1961	1956	1951	1946	1936	1926	1911	1901	1891	1881	1871	1861	1851	1841
Population	532		518																							
Rank	3		3																							
%Change	3.9																									

=== Cork ===
Year	2022	2016	2011	2006	2002	1996	1991	1986	1981	1979	1971	1966	1961	1956	1951	1946	1936	1926	1911	1901	1891	1881	1871	1861	1851	1841
Population	584	542	519	481	447	420	410	412	402	396	352	339	330	336	341	343	355	365	391	404	438	495	517	544	649	854
Rank	2	2	4	2	2	2	2	2	2	2	2	2	2	2	2	2	2	2	2	2	1	1	1	1	1	1
%Change	7.2	4.4	7.7	7.61	6.43	2.44	− (0.49)	2.48	1.52	12.5	3.84	2.73	(1.82)	(1.49)	(0.59)	(3.5)	(2.82)	(7.12)	(3.3)	(8.42)	(13.01)	− (4.26)	− (4.96)	− (16.18)	− (24)	

=== Galway ===
Year	2022	2016	2011	2006	2002	1996	1991	1986	1981	1979	1971	1966	1961	1956	1951	1946	1936	1926	1911	1901	1891	1881	1871	1861	1851	1841
Population	277	258	251	231	209	188	180	178	172	167	149	148	149	155	160	165	168	169	182	192	214	242	248	271	321	440
Rank]	3	3	5	3	3	3	3	3	3	3	3	3	3	3	3	3	3	4	4	4	4	4	3	3	4	2
%Change	6.9	2.8	8.1	10.53	11.17	4.44	1.12	3.49	2.91	12.08	0.68	(0.68)	(4.03)	(3.13)	(3.13)	(1.82)	(0.6)	(7.7)	(5.5)	(11.46)	(14.15)	− (2.42)	− (8.49)	− (15.58)	− (27.05)	

=== Derry ===
Year	2021	2016	2011	2006	2002	1996	1991	1986	1981	1979	1971	1966	1961	1956	1951	1946	1936	1926	1911	1901	1891	1881	1871	1861	1851	1841
Population	252		247																							
Rank	6		6																							
%Change	2																									

=== Kildare ===
Year	2022	2016	2011	2006	2002	1996	1991	1986	1981	1979	1971	1966	1961	1956	1951	1946	1936	1926	1911	1901	1891	1881	1871	1861	1851	1841
Population	247	222	210	186	163	134	122	116	104	97	71	66	64	65	66	64	57	58	66	63	70	75	83	90	95	114
Rank	4	4	7	4	5	5	7	8	9	9	13	14	14	14	14	17	20	19	17	20	20	20	20	21	24	25
%Change	11.3	5.7	12.7	14.11	21.64	9.84	5.17	11.54	7.22	36.62	7.58	3.13	(1.56)	(1.56)	3.13	12.28	(1.56)	(13.79)	4.76	(11.11)	(7.14)	− (9.64)	− (7.78)	− (5.26)	− (16.67)	

=== Limerick ===
Year	2022	2016	2011	2006	2002	1996	1991	1986	1981	1979	1971	1966	1961	1956	1951	1946	1936	1926	1911	1901	1891	1881	1871	1861	1851	1841	
Population	209	195	191	184	175	165	161	164	161	157	140	137	133	137	141	142	141	140	143	146	158	180	191	217	262	330	
Rank	6	6	5	8	5	4	4	4	4	4	4	4	4	4	4	4	5	6	7	8	8	8	8	8	7	6	6
%Change	7.2	2.1	4.01	5.14	6.06	2.48	− (1.83)	1.86	2.55	12.14	2.19	3.01	(3.01)	(2.92)	(0.71)	0.71	0.71	(2.14)	(2.10)	(8.22)	(13.92)	− (5.76)	− (11.98)	− (17.18)	− (20.61)		

=== Meath ===
Year	2022	2016	2011	2006	2002	1996	1991	1986	1981	1979	1971	1966	1961	1956	1951	1946	1936	1926	1911	1901	1891	1881	1871	1861	1851	1841
Population	220	194	184	163	134	109	105	103	95	90	71	67	65	66	66	66	61	62	65	67	76	87	95	110	140	183
Rank	5	6	9	6	8	10	10	10	11	11	13	13	13	13	14	14	17	18	18	18	18	18	18	17	16	16
%Change	13.4	5.4	13.0	21.6	22.94	3.81	1.94	8.42	5.56	26.76	5.97	3.08	(1.54)	-	-	8.2	(1.64)	(6.84)	(3.08)	(13.43)	(11.84)	− (8.42)	− (13.64)	− (21.43)	− (23.5)	

=== Tyrone ===
Year	2021	2016	2011	2006	2002	1996	1991	1986	1981	1979	1971	1966	1961	1956	1951	1946	1936	1926	1911	1901	1891	1881	1871	1861	1851	1841
Population	188		178																							
Rank	11		10																							
%Change	5.2																									

=== Armagh ===
Year	2021	2016	2011	2006	2002	1996	1991	1986	1981	1979	1971	1966	1961	1956	1951	1946	1936	1926	1911	1901	1891	1881	1871	1861	1851	1841
Population	194		175																							
Rank	10		11																							
%Change	10.9																									

=== Tipperary ===
Year	2022	2016	2011	2006	2002	1996	1991	1986	1981	1979	1971	1966	1961	1956	1951	1946	1936	1926	1911	1901	1891	1881	1871	1861	1851	1841
Population	167	160	159	149	140	133	131	136	134	133	123	121	123	128	133	135	137	140	151	159	172	199	216	248	331	435
Rank	7	7	12	7	6	6	5	5	5	5	5	5	5	6	6	7	8	7	7	7	7	7	6	5	3	3
%Change	4.4	0.6	6.4	6.43	5.26	1.53	− (3.68)	1.49	0.75	8.13	1.65	(1.65)	(2.19)	(2.19)	(1.5)	(1.5)	(2.19)	(7.86)	(5.3)	(8.18)	(15.7)	− (8.87)	− (12.9)	− (25.08)	− (23.91)	

=== Donegal ===
Year	2022	2016	2011	2006	2002	1996	1991	1986	1981	1979	1971	1966	1961	1956	1951	1946	1936	1926	1911	1901	1891	1881	1871	1861	1851	1841
Population	167	158	161	147	137	129	128	130	125	122	108	109	114	122	114	136	142	153	169	174	187	206	218	237	255	296
Rank	8	8	14	8	7	7	7	6	6	6	6	8	8	8	7	6	5	5	5	5	5	5	5	6	7	7
%Change	5.1	(1.9)	9.3	7.3	6.2	0.78	− (1.54)	4.0	2.46	12.96	(0.93)	(4.59)	(7.02)	7.02	(19.02)	(4.42)	(7.75)	(10.46)	(4.59)	(7.47)	(10.16)	− (5.5)	− (8.02)	− (7.06)	− (13.85)	

=== Wexford ===
Year	2022	2016	2011	2006	2002	1996	1991	1986	1981	1979	1971	1966	1961	1956	1951	1946	1936	1926	1911	1901	1891	1881	1871	1861	1851	1841
Population	163	149	145	132	116	104	102	103	99	96	86	83	83	87	90	92	94	96	102	104	112	123	132	143	180	202
Rank	9	9	15	10	11	11	11	10	10	10	9	9	9	9	9	9	9	9	10	10	11	12	12	12	10	12
%Change	8.1	2.8	10.3	13.79	11.54	1.96	−0.97															−6.82	−7.69	−20.56	−10.89	

=== Kerry ===
Year	2022	2016	2011	2006	2002	1996	1991	1986	1981	1979	1971	1966	1961	1956	1951	1946	1936	1926	1911	1901	1891	1881	1871	1861	1851	1841
Population	156	147	145	140	132	126	121	124	122	120	112	112	116	122	126	133	139	149	159	165	179	201	196	201	238	293
Rank	11	10	16	9	9	8	8	7	7	7	6	7	7	7	8	8	7	6	6	6	6	6	7	8	8	8
%Change	5.4	1.4	3.7	6.06	4.76	4.13	−2.42															2.55	−2.49	−15.55	−18.77	

=== Wicklow ===
Year	2022	2016	2011	2006	2002	1996	1991	1986	1981	1979	1971	1966	1961	1956	1951	1946	1936	1926	1911	1901	1891	1881	1871	1861	1851	1841
Population	155	142	136	126	114	102	97	95	87	84	66	60	58	60	63	60	59	58	61	61	62	70	78	86	98	126
Rank	10	11	17	11	12	12	12	12	15	15	15	15	17	18	18	19	19	19	21	22	24	24	22	24	23	23
%Change	9.2	4.4	8.1	10.53	11.76	5.15	2.11															−10.26	−9.3	−12.24	−22.22	

=== Mayo ===
Year	2022	2016	2011	2006	2002	1996	1991	1986	1981	1979	1971	1966	1961	1956	1951	1946	1936	1926	1911	1901	1891	1881	1871	1861	1851	1841
Population	137	130	131	124	117	111	110	115	114	114	109	115	123	133	141	148	161	172	192	199	219	245	246	254	274	388
Rank	13	12	18	12	10	9	9	9	8	8	7	6	5	5	4	4	4	3	3	3	3	3	4	4	5	4
%Change	5.4	0.8	5.4	7.09	9.41	0.91	−8.09															−0.41	−3.15	−7.3	−39.87	

=== Louth ===
Year	2022	2016	2011	2006	2002	1996	1991	1986	1981	1979	1971	1966	1961	1956	1951	1946	1936	1926	1911	1901	1891	1881	1871	1861	1851	1841
Population	139	128	123	111	102	92	91	92	89	86	75	70	67	69	69	66	64	63	64	66	71	78	84	91	108	128
Rank	12	13	19	13	14	15	13	13	12	13	11	12	12	12	12	14	16	17	19	19	19	19	19	19	22	22
%Change	8.6	4.06	10.4	8.82	10.87	1.1	−1.09															−7.14	−7.69	−15.74	−15.63	

=== Clare ===
Year	2022	2016	2011	2006	2002	1996	1991	1986	1981	1979	1971	1966	1961	1956	1951	1946	1936	1926	1911	1901	1891	1881	1871	1861	1851	1841
Population	127	118	117	111	103	94	90	91	88	85	75	74	74	77	81	85	90	95	104	112	124	141	147	166	212	286
Rank	14	14	20	13	13	13	15	14	14	14	11	10	10	10	10	10	10	10	9	9	9	9	9	9	9	9
%Change	7.2	0.9	5.3	7.77	9.57	4.44	−1.1															−4.08	−11.45	−21.7	−25.87	

=== Waterford ===
Year	2022	2016	2011	2006	2002	1996	1991	1986	1981	1979	1971	1966	1961	1956	1951	1946	1936	1926	1911	1901	1891	1881	1871	1861	1851	1841
Population	127	114	108	102	94	91	91	89	87	77	73	71	74	75	76	78	79	84	87	98	112	123	134	164	196	227
Rank	15	15	21	15	15	13	13	14	12	12	10	11	11	11	11	11	11	13	13	13	13	13	13	13	13	15
%Change	9.2	1.8	5.3	6.93	7.45	3.3	0															−8.94	−8.21	−18.29	−16.33	

=== Kilkenny ===
Year	2022	2016	2011	2006	2002	1996	1991	1986	1981	1979	1971	1966	1961	1956	1951	1946	1936	1926	1911	1901	1891	1881	1871	1861	1851	1841
Population	104	99	95	87	80	75	73	73	70	69	61	60	61	64	65	66	68	70	74	79	87	99	109	124	158	202
Rank	16	16	22	16	16	16	16	16	16	16	16	15	15	15	17	14	14	15	15	15	15	16	16	15	14	12
%Change	4.5	4.2	8.9	8.75	6.67	2.74	0															−9.17	−12.1	−21.52	−21.78	

=== Westmeath ===
Year	2022	2016	2011	2006	2002	1996	1991	1986	1981	1979	1971	1966	1961	1956	1951	1946	1936	1926	1911	1901	1891	1881	1871	1861	1851	1841	
Population	96	88	86	79	71	63	61	63	61	59	53	52	52	54	54	54	54	56	59	61	65	71	78	90	111	141	
Rank	17	17																									
%Change	8	+3.0	+8.6	+10.4	+13.5	+2.3	−2.4	+3.0	+2.7	+11.8	+1.3	+0.1		−2.3	−0.6	−0.9	+0.4	−3.7	−5.3	−2.7	−5.3	−9.3	−8.5	−13.7	−18.4	−21.2	+3.2

=== Laois ===
Year	2022	2016	2011	2006	2002	1996	1991	1986	1981	1979	1971	1966	1961	1956	1951	1946	1936	1926	1911	1901	1891	1881	1871	1861	1851	1841
Population	91	84	80	67	58	52	52	53	51	49	45	44	45	47	48	49	50	51	54	57	64	73	79	90	111	153
Rank	18	18																								
%Change	8.2	+5.1	+20.1	+14.1	+11.0	+1.2	−1.8	+4.1	+2.5	+10.3	+1.5	−1.1	−4.3	−2.8	−2.5	−0.8	−2.8	−5.7	−4.9	−11.5	−11.3	−8.3	−12.0	−18.8	−27.5	+5.5

=== Offaly ===
Year	2022	2016	2011	2006	2002	1996	1991	1986	1981	1979	1971	1966	1961	1956	1951	1946	1936	1926	1911	1901	1891	1881	1871	1861	1851	1841
Population	83	78	77	71	64	59	58	60	58	57	52	52	52	52	53	54	51	53	57	60	66	73	76	90	112	147
Rank	19	19	19	18	18	18	18	18	18	18	20	20	21	21	22	22	22	23	23	23	21	21	24	21	18	20
%Change	6	1.3	8.4	10.94	8.47	1.72	−3.33															−3.95	−15.56	−19.64	−23.81	

=== Cavan ===
Year	2022	2016	2011	2006	2002	1996	1991	1986	1981	1979	1971	1966	1961	1956	1951	1946	1936	1926	1911	1901	1891	1881	1871	1861	1851	1841
Population	81	76	73	64	57	53	53	54	54	54	53	54	57	62	66	70	77	82	91	98	112	129	141	154	174	243
Rank	20	20	20	20	21	20	20	21	21	20	19	18	18	17	14	13	13	12	12	12	11	11	10	11	11	11
%Change	6.6	4.1	13.9	12.28	7.55	0	−1.85															−8.51	−8.44	−11.49	−28.4	

=== Sligo ===
Year	2022	2016	2011	2006	2002	1996	1991	1986	1981	1979	1971	1966	1961	1956	1951	1946	1936	1926	1911	1901	1891	1881	1871	1861	1851	1841
Population	70	65	65	61	58	55	54	56	55	55	50	51	54	57	61	62	67	71	79	84	98	111	115	124	128	180
Rank	22	21	21	21	20	19	19	19	19	19	21	21	19	19	19	18	15	14	14	14	13	14	14	15	17	17
%Change	6.5	0.0	7.2	5.17	5.45	1.85	−3.57															−3.48	−7.26	−3.13	−28.89	

=== Roscommon ===
Year	2022	2016	2011	2006	2002	1996	1991	1986	1981	1979	1971	1966	1961	1956	1951	1946	1936	1926	1911	1901	1891	1881	1871	1861	1851	1841
Population	70	64	64	59	54	52	52	55	55	54	54	56	59	64	68	73	78	84	94	102	114	132	141	157	173	254
Rank	21	22	22	22	22	21	21	20	19	20	17	17	16	15	13	12	11	11	11	11	10	10	10	10	12	10
%Change	8.4	0.0	8.7	9.26	3.85	0	−5.45															−6.38	−10.19	−9.25	−31.89	

=== Fermanagh ===
Year	2021	2016	2011	2006	2002	1996	1991	1986	1981	1979	1971	1966	1961	1956	1951	1946	1936	1926	1911	1901	1891	1881	1871	1861	1851	1841
Population	63		62																							
Rank	28		28																							
%Change	3.8																									

=== Monaghan ===
Year	2022	2016	2011	2006	2002	1996	1991	1986	1981	1979	1971	1966	1961	1956	1951	1946	1936	1926	1911	1901	1891	1881	1871	1861	1851	1841
Population	65	61	60	56	53	51	51	52	51	50	46	46	47	52	55	57	61	65	71	75	86	103	115	126	142	200
Rank	23	23	23	23	23	23	23	23	22	22	22	22	22	21	20	20	17	16	16	16	16	15	14	14	15	14
%Change	5.6	1.7	8.0	5.66	3.92	0	−1.92															−10.43	−8.73	−11.27	−29	

=== Carlow ===
Year	2022	2016	2011	2006	2002	1996	1991	1986	1981	1979	1971	1966	1961	1956	1951	1946	1936	1926	1911	1901	1891	1881	1871	1861	1851	1841
Population	61	56	54	50	46	42	41	41	40	39	34	34	33	34	34	34	34	34	36	38	41	47	52	57	68	86
Rank	24	24	24	24	24	24	24	24	24	24	24	24	24	25	26	26	26	26	26	26	26	26	26	26	26	26
%Change	8.8	3.7	8.3	8.7	9.52	2.44	0															−9.62	−8.77	−16.18	−20.93	

=== Longford ===
Year	2022	2016	2011	2006	2002	1996	1991	1986	1981	1979	1971	1966	1961	1956	1951	1946	1936	1926	1911	1901	1891	1881	1871	1861	1851	1841
Population	46	40	39	34	31	30	30	31	31	31	28	29	31	33	35	36	38	40	44	47	53	61	65	72	82	115
Rank	25	25	25	25	25	25	25	25	25	25	25	26	26	26	25	25	25	25	25	25	25	25	25	25	25	24
%Change	14.1	2.6	13.3	9.68	3.33	0	−3.23															−6.15	−9.72	−12.2	−28.7	

=== Leitrim ===
Year	2022	2016	2011	2006	2002	1996	1991	1986	1981	1979	1971	1966	1961	1956	1951	1946	1936	1926	1911	1901	1891	1881	1871	1861	1851	1841
Population	35	32	32	29	26	25	25	27	28	28	28	31	33	37	41	45	51	56	64	69	79	90	96	105	112	155
Rank	26	26	26	26	26	26	26	26	26	26	25	25	24	24	24	24	22	22	19	17	17	17	17	18	18	18
%Change	9.5	0.0	9.8	11.54	4	0	−7.41															−6.25	−8.57	−6.25	−27.74	

== See also ==
- Census of Ireland, 1911
- Demographics of the Republic of Ireland
- Demographics of Northern Ireland
- Republic of Ireland Census 2011
- Irish diaspora
