= Afer =

Afer may refer to:

- Afer, an individual of the Afri tribe after which the continent of Africa is probably named
- Afer, a Roman cognomen in reference to Africa, used by several people listed below; see also list of Roman cognomina
- Afer ventus, another name for Lips, the Roman deity of the southwest wind; see Anemoi
- The Afep pigeon (Columba unicincta)
- A song on the 1991 Enya album Shepherd Moons

== As an acronym ==
- Air Force Expeditionary Service Ribbon
- American Foundation for Equal Rights
- Association Française d'Epargne et de Retraite
- Autoritea Feroviara Romana, the Romanian Railway Authority; see Rail transport in Romania

== People ==
- Antonius Guilelmus Amo Afer (1703–c.1759), alternate name for Anton Wilhelm Amo, Ghanaian-German academic
- Arnobius Afer (died 4th century), also Arnobius the Elder, Roman rhetorician in the province of Africa
- Domitius Afer (died 60), Roman orator
- Gaius Marius Victorinus Afer (4th century), also Gaius Marius Victorinus, Roman grammarian and rhetorician
- Publius Aelius Hadrianus Afer, father of the Roman emperor Hadrian
- Publius Terentius Afer (died 159 BC), Roman comic playwright better known as Terence

== Scientific names of organisms ==
All named because the species is native to Africa.

- Cinnyris afer, greater double-collared sunbird
- Euplectes afer, yellow-crowned bishop
- Francolinus afer, red-necked francolin
- Nilaus afer, brubru
- Orycteropus afer, aardvark
- Papyrocranus afer , reticulate knifefish
- Parus afer, southern grey tit, also classified as Melaniparus afer
- Ptilostomus afer, piapiac
- Turtur afer, blue-spotted wood dove
- Afer, a genus of gastropods in the family of true whelks (Buccinidae)

== See also ==
- Afri (disambiguation)
