= Great Irish Famine's effect on the United States economy =

The Great Irish Famine's effect on the United States economy was substantial.

Irish immigration to the United States during the Great Famine in Ireland was substantial and had a lasting impact on the economy of the United States. In 1990, 44 million Americans claimed Irish ethnicity. Many of these citizens can trace their ancestry to the Great Famine from 1845-1852 when 300 Irish would disembark daily in New York City. By 1850 the United States had 961,719 Irish citizens, 42.8% of whom were born in Ireland. This comprised 43% of all foreign born population of the United States at the time. New York saw the largest amount of Irish immigration and by 1855, 26% of population in Manhattan was Irish and by 1900 that percentage had risen to 60%. The key component affected by this immigration was the laborer force.

Additionally, this rise in population also helped decide the outcome of the Civil War. The Irish emigrants who found their way to the South during the Great Famine saw the situation between the North and the South not unlike their previous situation between Ireland and Britain where they had felt exploited because while there was free trade between Ireland and Britain, Ireland provided potatoes and beef to England while receiving manufactured goods in return. However, while manufacturing jobs pay well the jobs of farm laborers do not; thus, the new Irish in the Southern United States felt the North exploited their new home in the South the same way. Because the Irish emigrants in the South could understand the plight of their new home many willingly took up arms against the North during the Civil War. To counter this, the Union Army employed 144,000 Irish-born troops during the War most of whom were drafted to serve. While a draftee could elude duty by paying $300 most Irish emigrants were too poor to do so, and had to fight.

Originally, Irish emigrants found work hard to find and many job advertisements included the phrase "No Irish Need Apply." However, the Irish were willing to work for cheap and would sometimes work for as little as 50 cents a day. Eventually it became too uneconomical not to hire them. "America's early network of roads, railways and canals right across the country owes much to the Irishman with his strong back and ability to wield a shovel or pick axe from dawn till dusk." By 1850 in Boston the Irish Emigration Society "reported finding 'a hundred jobs a day' for Irish girls." During a time when the United States was starting to unlock its industrial potential and continuing to grow west, Irish immigration helped to give the United States the one resource keeping its economy expanding - new labor.
