= Afri (organisation) =

Irish non-governmental organisation

- Action from Ireland
- Type: NGO
- Location: Ireland
- Website: www.afri.ie

Afri (Action from Ireland) is a Dublin-based NGO that promotes human rights, peace, justice and environmentalism, especially in the Global South, with a focus on injustice caused by conflict. Its patron is Archbishop Desmond Tutu. Another patron of is former UN Assistant Secretary General Denis Halliday.

It is a member of the International Campaign to Abolish Nuclear Weapons, the International Peace Bureau, Stop Climate Chaos Coalition, and Irish Development Education Association.

Its offices are in Phibsboro, Dublin.

== Mission ==
Its mission is the promotion of global justice and peace, and the reduction of poverty; this includes, but is not limited to, the progressive reduction of global militarisation.

== History ==
Initially, as of 1 September 1975, AfRI was taken from the phrase "Aid from the Republic of Ireland". At the International Conference on World Peace and Poverty in 1982 the Afri name was re-designated, now meaning "Action from Ireland".

== Annual events ==
=== Famine Walk ===
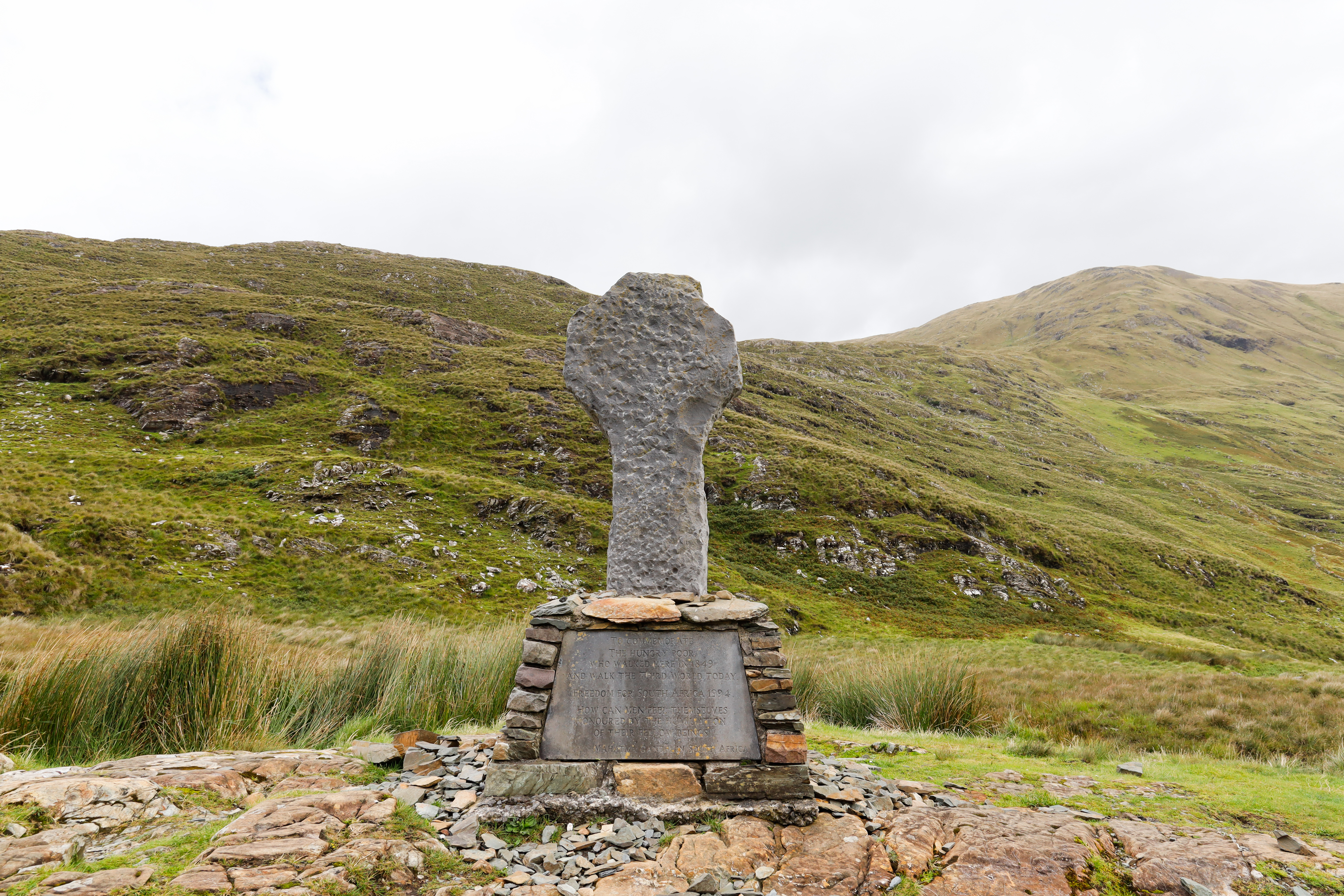
Doolough memorial erected by Afri and unveiled in 1994 at the seventh annual walk led by Arun Gandhi to commemorate the Doolough tragedy and the end of the apartheid.

Each year since 1988, Afri has hosted a Famine Walk to commemorate the Great Hunger at Doolough in south County Mayo.

=== Feile Bride ===
Feile Bride celebrates and reflects on the spirit of St Brigid’s millennium-old message of justice, peace and hope. It happens annually in Kildare around the start of Spring in February. Its roots may be traced back to an episode in 1983 when five young men from Derry learned how to make Brigid Crosses and donated the proceeds from their sale to Afri. This developed into a schools’ campaign, the Brigid Peace Cross Campaign. Ten years later, in 1993, the first Féile Bríde was organized, to celebrate the success of the schools’ campaign, intended as a ‘one-off’ justice and peace conference. It was held in Kildare and has been re-run there every spring-time since.

=== Hedge school ===
Since 1998, Afri has runs a hedge school at different places around Ireland, which has become an annual event reflecting on 'contemporary issues of injustice and oppression through conversation, debate and music'.

== Campaigns ==
Afri initiated a national “active citizenship” campaign in 2010, after a Government-initiated 'Active Citizenship Office' was closed the previous year, saying “traditional sources of authority have proven to be ineffective”.

Afri were co-organisers of the POSSIBILITIES event, which in 2011 welcomed the Dalai Lama to Ireland.

In 2014, the organisation ran two petitions on Change.org including one to ban fracking and another to inspect war planes using Shannon Airport.

Their partnerships with the global south include the Kenya Pastoralist Journalist Network and the Niger Delta communities.

Afri also work in Northern Ireland with the charity Children in Crossfire.
