= Prevention of Crime (Ireland) Act 1848 =

Act of the Parliament of the United Kingdom

- Act of Parliament
- Parliament of the United Kingdom
- Long title: An Act for the better Prevention of Crime and Outrage in certain Parts of Ireland until the First Day of December One thousand eight hundred and forty-nine, and to the End of the then next Session of Parliament.
- Citation: 11 & 12 Vict. c. 2
- Territorial extent: United Kingdom

Dates
- Royal assent: 20 December 1847
- Commencement: 20 December 1847 (Note: The Acts of Parliament (Commencement) Act 1793.)
- Expired: 31 December 1849 (Note: Section 32.)
- Repealed: 5 August 1891
Other legislation
Amended by	Statute Law Revision Act 1875; Statute Law Revision Act 1878
Repealed by	Statute Law Revision Act 1891

Status: Repealed

Text of statute as originally enacted

The Prevention of Crime (Ireland) Act 1848 (11 & 12 Vict. c. 2) was an act of the Parliament of the United Kingdom regarding crime in Ireland, which was then part of the United Kingdom of Great Britain and Ireland. The bill was introduced by Sir George Grey on 29 November 1847, and was passed by both houses; it received royal assent on 20 December 1847. It was passed because of increasing violent criminal activity in Ireland that was causing the government concern.

The act gave the Lord Lieutenant of Ireland the power to organise the island into districts and bring police forces into them at the districts' expense. It limited who could own guns and, under penalty, coerced all of the men between the ages of 16 and 60 to join in a type of posse comitatus in each district to assist in apprehending suspected murderers when killings took place, or else be guilty of a misdemeanour themselves.

== Subsequent developments ==
The whole act was repealed by section 1 of, and the first schedule to, the Statute Law Revision Act 1891 (54 & 55 Vict. c. 67), which came into force on 5 August 1891.
