= Norman Ackroyd =

English aquatint artist (1938–2024)

Norman Ackroyd CBE RA
- Born: 26 March 1938; Leeds, England
- Died: 16 September 2024 (aged 86); Bermondsey, London, England
- Education: Leeds College of Art (1956–61); Royal College of Art (1961–64)
- Occupation: Artist
- Known for: Etching; Printmaking
- Children: 4 inc. Poppy Ackroyd
- Website: www.normanackroyd.com

Norman Ackroyd CBE RA (26 March 1938 – 16 September 2024) was an English visual artist known primarily for his etchings and work with aquatint. He lived and was based in Bermondsey, London.

== Background ==
Ackroyd was born on 26 March 1938 in Leeds, Yorkshire. His father was Albert Ackroyd, a butcher, and his mother Clara Ackroyd (née Briggs) was a weaver. He attended Cockburn High School, then Leeds College of Art from 1957 to 1961 and the Royal College of Art, London, from 1961 to 1964, where he studied under Julian Trevelyan and met his future wife, the artist Sylvia Buckland, alongside David Hockney, Mary Quant and Zandra Rhodes. Subsequently, he lived for several years in the United States. He was elected to the Royal Academy of Art in 1988 as an associate, then a Royal Academician in 1991, and appointed Professor of Etching, University of the Arts, in 1994. He was elected Senior Fellow of the Royal College of Art in 2000, and in the 2007 New Year Honours was appointed CBE for services to Engraving and Printing.

== Work ==
In the 1980s Ackroyd emerged as a landscape artist. Central Saint Martins College of Art and Design mounted a retrospective exhibition of these works in 2006 and kept an archive of his work. His works range from minimalist, nearly abstract impressions, to detailed images. His work almost never includes the human figure, the landscape subjects are often of old human habitation. His prints range from tiny etchings intended to be bound into books to huge etchings. His preferred medium for working directly on paper was watercolour, including a project pairing his watercolours with poems by Kevin Crossley-Holland published under the title Moored Man. He designed a number of large-scale, etched reliefs in steel or bronze commissioned for architectural projects in London, Cambridge, and Moscow. Other completed projects include a mural at the Sainsbury Laboratory Cambridge University, showing scenes from the Galapagos, and a door at Great Portland Estates in London, W1.

In 2009, with poet Douglas Dunn, he published A Line in the Water. Ackroyd's working methods are described in an issue of Archipelago (No. III, Spring 2009).

Ackroyd's work can be found in several British and American galleries including Eames Fine Art, the Zillah Bell Gallery (which holds the largest collection of his work in the North of England), the Tate, the British Museum, and the National Gallery of Art, Washington. He has been in several television programmes, including BBC documentaries in 1980, 2006, and What Do Artists Do All Day? (2013). In September 2024 he was interviewed by Michael Berkeley on Radio 3's programme Private Passions.

== Personal life ==
Ackroyd had four children; three daughters and a son. His daughter Poppy is a composer and musician. Ackroyd died in Bermondsey on 16 September 2024, at the age of 86.

== Bibliography ==
- Ackroyd, Norman (2003). The Stratton Street series. Herne Bay: Categorical Books. pp. 88pp. ISBN 9781904662020.
- Crossley-Holland, Kevin; Ackroyd, Norman (2006). Moored Man: Poems of North Norfolk. Enitharmon Press. ISBN 9781904634539.
- Ackroyd, Norman; Dunn, Douglas (2009). A Line in the Water. London: Royal Academy of Arts. p. 159. ISBN 9781903973684.
- Wyatt, John; Ackroyd, Norman (2012). The Shining Levels. Little Toller Books. ISBN 9781908213037.
- Ackroyd, Norman; Devaney, Edith (2013). Summer Exhibition Illustrated 2013. Royal Academy of Arts. ISBN 9781907533433.
- Ackroyd, Norman (2014). A Shetland Notebook. Royal Academy of Arts, London. ISBN 9781907533891.
- Ackroyd, Norman (2015). A Hebridean Notebook. Royal Academy of Arts. ISBN 9781910350355.
- Ackroyd, Norman (2018). The Furthest Lands. Yorkshire Sculpture Park. ISBN 9781908432438.
- Ackroyd, Norman (2022). An Irish Notebook. Royal Academy of Arts. p. 96. ISBN 9781912520619.
