= Grasett Park =

Public park in Toronto

- Interactive map of Grasett Park
- Type: Municipal park and memorial
- Location: Corner of Adelaide Street West and Widmer Street Toronto, Ontario, Canada
- Coordinates: 43°38′51″N 79°23′29″W
- Opened: 2021
- Manager: Canada Ireland Foundation
- Website: www.canadairelandfoundation.com/grasettpark/

Grasett Park is situated at the corner of Adelaide Street West and Widmer Street in downtown Toronto, Canada. It is a public space that commemorates Dr. George Robert Grasett who, in the summer of 1847, gave his life to care for Irish migrants fleeing the Great Famine, many of whom arrived in Toronto sickened or dying from typhus, then known as ship fever. At the time, Toronto had merely 20,000 residents, and thus struggled to accommodate the more than 38,000 migrants who arrived in 1847 alone.

Grasett Park is a companion site to nearby Ireland Park, which was completed in 2007.

== History ==
Grasett Park is built on the same plot of land where temporary fever sheds were erected to accommodate the sick, once the adjacent Emigrant Hospital had exceeded its capacity.

Dr. Grasett died of typhus at age 36 on July 16, 1847, less than month after he was appointed to the position of Medical Superintendent of the Emigrant Hospital. Other healthcare providers who lost their lives during the infectious epidemic include Dr. Joseph Hamilton; nurses Susan Bailey, Anne Slocumb, Sarah Jane Sherwood, Sarah Duggan and Catherine Doherty; as well as hospital orderlies John McNabb, Richard Jones, and William Harrison. Bishop Michael Power, Toronto’s first Catholic bishop, and Emigrant Agent Edward McElderry also contracted fever while administering to the ill, and died shortly thereafter. The names of these individuals are etched onto benches within Grasett Park.

The park officially opened on July 16, 2021, commemorating the 174th anniversary of Dr. Grasett's death. Out of respect to the challenges facing healthcare workers due to the COVID-19 pandemic, the official dedication ceremony was held virtually rather than onsite.

=== Park design ===
Designed by Denegri Bessai Studio, the park sits on a base of black Quebec granite etched with James Cane's 1842 map of the City of Toronto. A series of 10 meter (30 foot) tall laminated structural glass panels rise vertically at various angles, forming a sculptural installation. Embedded within the glass panels are cheesecloth patterns, referencing the cheesecloth used as bandages as well as the panels of cheesecloth hung in the fever sheds to shield patients from flies.
