= Roger Kohn =

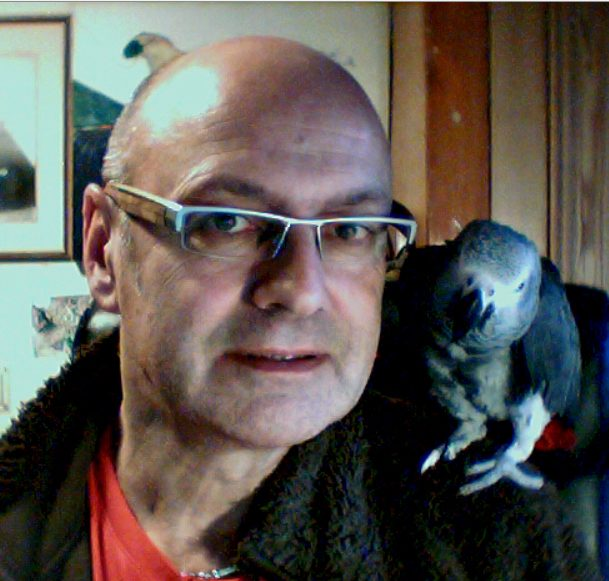
- Roger Kohn at home with Chingachgook
- Born: York, England
- Occupations: Designer, author
- Spouse: Karen Kohn
- Website: Roger Kohn

Roger Kohn is a British designer and author. He studied with Rowan Gillespie at York School of Art, and is the Irish sculptor's biographer.

== Early life and education ==
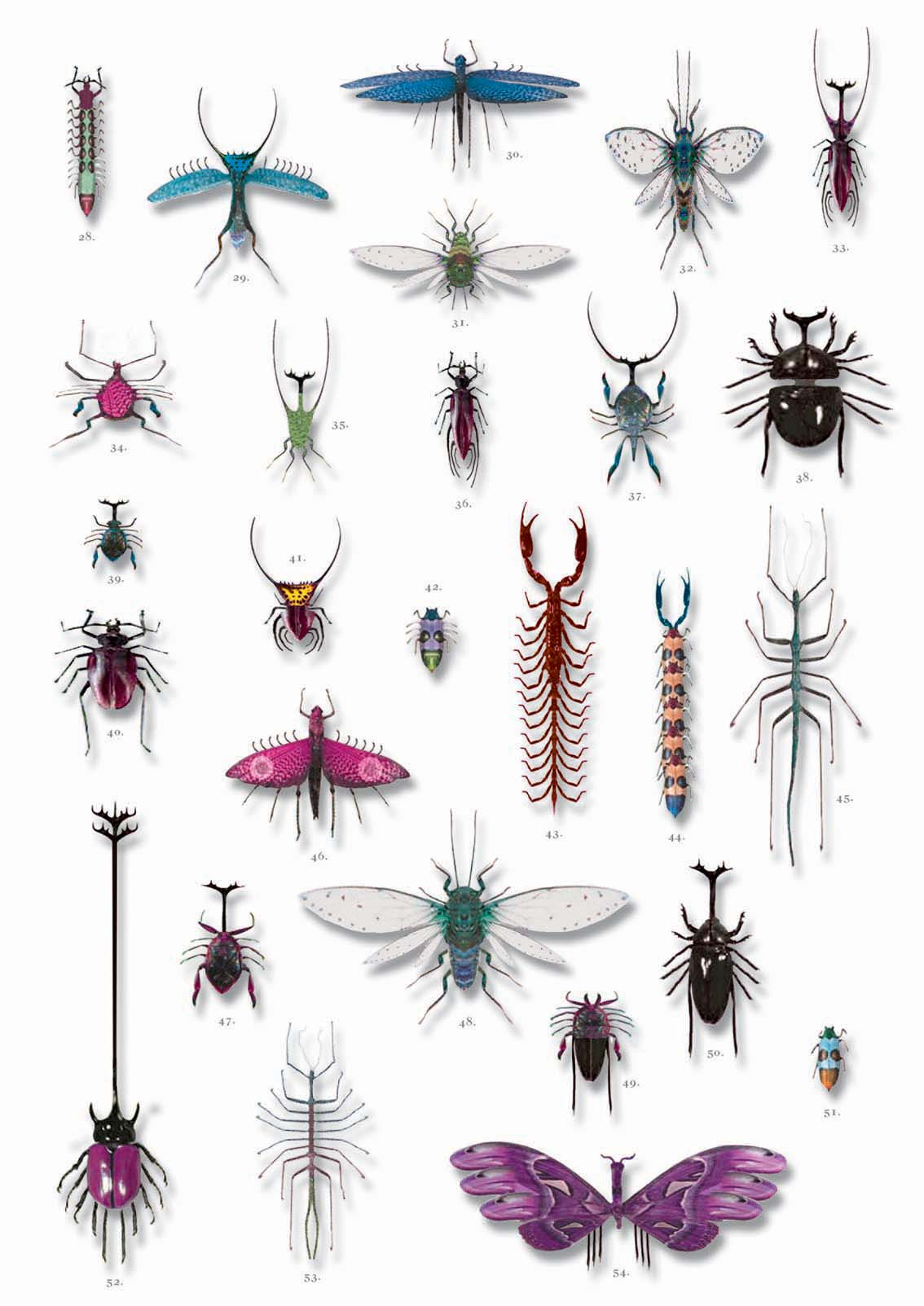
Roger Kohn Buggery by Numbers #28-55, 2003).

Roger Kohn was born in York, England.

He was educated at Marton Hall Preparatory School and Pocklington School. After a year at York School of Art, where he studied with Rowan Gillespie, he gained a first class honours degree in graphic design at Chelsea School of Art along with, among others, Edward Bell (artist). At Chelsea, Kohn was taught by Edward Wright, Dennis Bailey, and Susan Einzig, and became friends with part-time tutor, the Scottish surrealist poet and musician Ivor Cutler. Cutler's influence on Kohn was a subtle one, but can be seen in his art. In the words of the artist himself:

In the early 1970s, when space travel and moon landings were very much in the news, Ivor was ahead of the time with his extraordinary eye for detail. He encouraged me to think small and push the boundaries of perception by exploring the minutiae of the minuscule, celebrating the precious details of our planet along the way.

== Career ==
Kohn travelled extensively in Latin America (once declining a request from MI6 to return to Argentina on their behalf). He worked initially with the Diagram Group, a London-based cooperative group of designers (which included the brilliant avant-garde composer and musician, Cornelius Cardew), writers, artists and editors, led by Bruce Robertson and Bob Chapman, supplying visualised information to publishers in Britain and the United States; and was Art Editor on the definitive encyclopedia Musical Instruments of the World., which featured in Eduardo Paolozzi's 1985 "Lost Magic Kingdoms" exhibition at the Museum of Mankind in London. After a brief spell at the Hamlyn Publishing Group he became Art Editor at Octopus Books. In 1983 he left to set up his own design business and to pursue his interest in art and photography, visiting over 60 countries and establishing an extensive photographic library. Besides Ivor Cutler the influences on Kohn's writing and art are diverse:

"Being a fan of the art of dadaist Marcel Duchamp, the drama of Samuel Beckett and Harold Pinter, the music of Frank Zappa and Captain Beefheart and the humour of Spike Milligan, I identified strongly with Ivor’s eccentricity and the absurdist nature of his unassuming yet often abrasive persona."

He cites the imagery of album sleeve designer Cal Schenkel as perhaps his greatest visual influence.

Having exhibited along with Vanilla Beer and Jane Jackson in the Art Attack exhibition at Cuts Gallery, Kensington, Kohn held his first one-man show, "Hung, Drawn and Slaughtered" at the Zillah Bell Contemporary Art Gallery, Thirsk in October 2003. Described by Pru Farrier in the Stockton and Darlington Times (2003) in the following terms:

"A series of insect drawings which look like the sort of thing a Victorian collector would have framed - row upon row of luminously-coloured exotic bugs; look closer, and you discover they are all figments of fancy, the artist outdoing nature"

== Looking for Orion ==
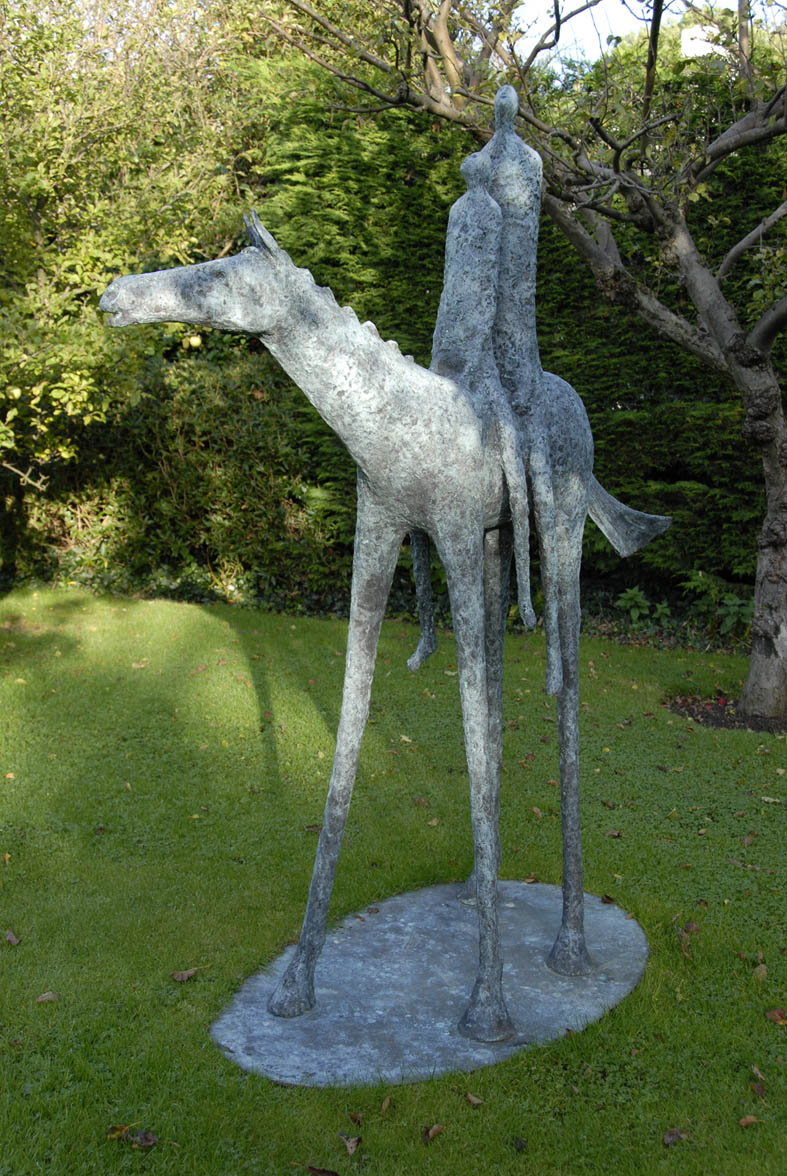
"Looking for Orion" Rowan Gillespie (Photography, Roger Kohn, 2007)

Before undertaking the biography of Rowan Gillespie, Kohn undertook several book/design projects. These included working with Sarah Mucha of the Mucha Foundation on the book Alphonse Mucha in 2005 (Kohn is style and design consultant for the family of the Czech belle epoch artist and designer); and work for the artist Vanilla Beer daughter of Anthony Stafford Beer, best known for his work in the fields of operational research and management cybernetics. Kohn designed and produced Beer's Prenez, Mangez et Vivez (2006).

During the research period for Looking for Orion, Kohn worked closely with Moondance Productions on their Film Biography of Rowan Gillespie, Sculpting Life (Moondance Productions 2007). He travelled to various locations in Europe and North America, with Gillespie and Shane Brennan of Moondance Productions; conducted interviews and took many of the photographs that illustrate the biography. As well as researching Gillespie's background and artistic roots, the biography provides a catalogue of almost four decades of the sculptor's work and was launched in Ireland, at the Royal Hibernian Academy, to coincide with the Irish sculptor's unveiling of his latest work Proclamation, which depicts the execution of the seven signatories and the seven other leaders of the Easter Rising, and now stands opposite Kilmainham Gaol.

== Other activities ==
Amongst other work, Kohn has undertaken filmography on Verónico Cruz and designs and produces the publicity material for African Revival a UK-based charity that provides Aid to 'self-sustaining projects' in Sudan, Uganda, Kenya, Malawi, Mozambique, South Africa and Zambia. He is product designer for Fruity Faces, the Dragons' Den fruit case manufacturer that encourages healthy eating and gives its profits to charity. Kohn also designs the magazine showcasing the work of British Glass Artists in the UK, produced for the Contemporary Glass Society, and founded by David Reekie as British Artists in Glass. The Contemporary Glass Society is an Arts Council funded organisation that supports and encourages the development of glass art in the United Kingdom.

In 2005, Kohn was among the many artists, including Sir Paul McCartney, David Hockney, Tracey Emin, Edward Bell and Damien Hirst who produced a postcard (R. Kohn Volviendo a Casa, Art of Care 2005) selected by Bernard Williams of Christie's for the Art of Care Auction in Edinburgh.

== Gallery ==
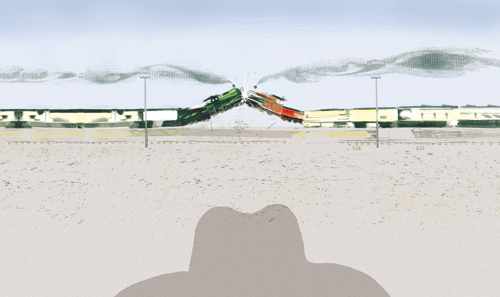
The Great Crush Crash, 2003.

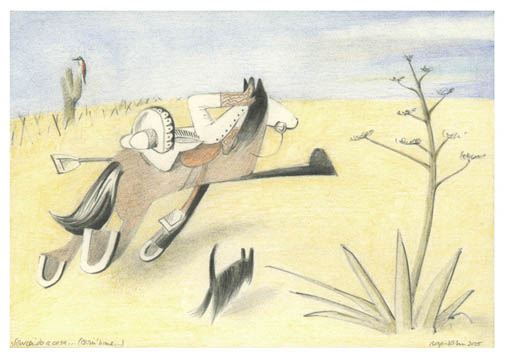
Volviendo a casa, 2003

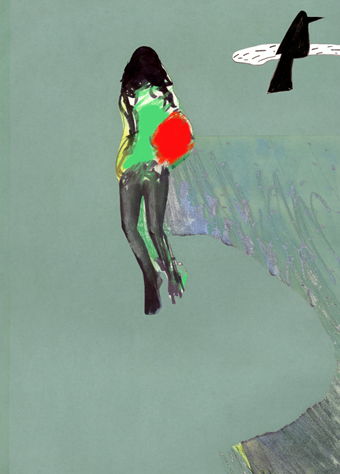
Geraldine, 2003. Limited edition inkjet print.

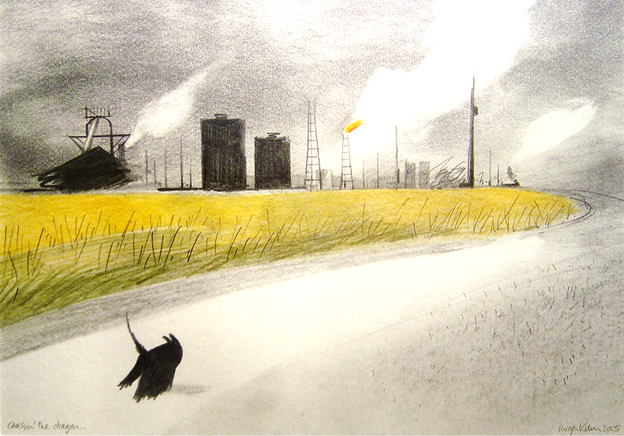
Chasin' the Dragon, 2005.

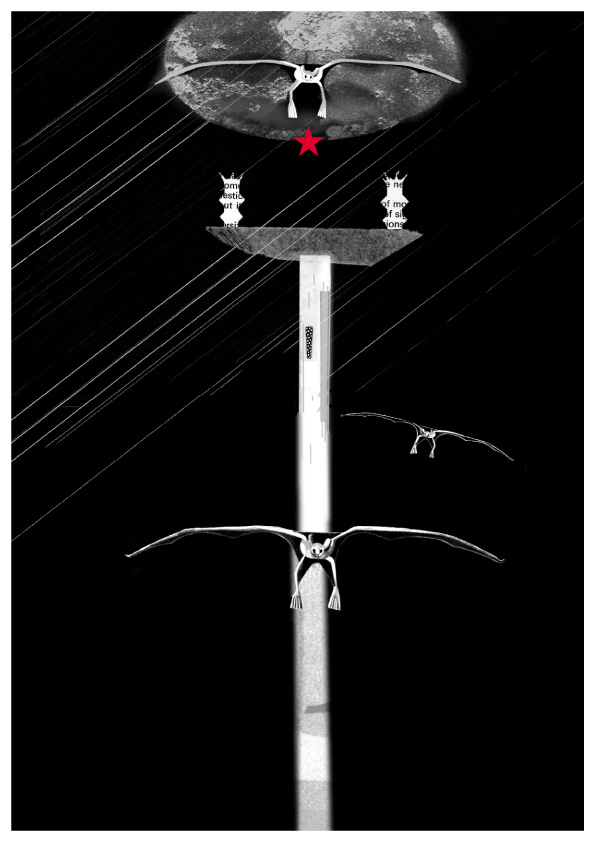
'Ataque de los murcielagos' 2003.

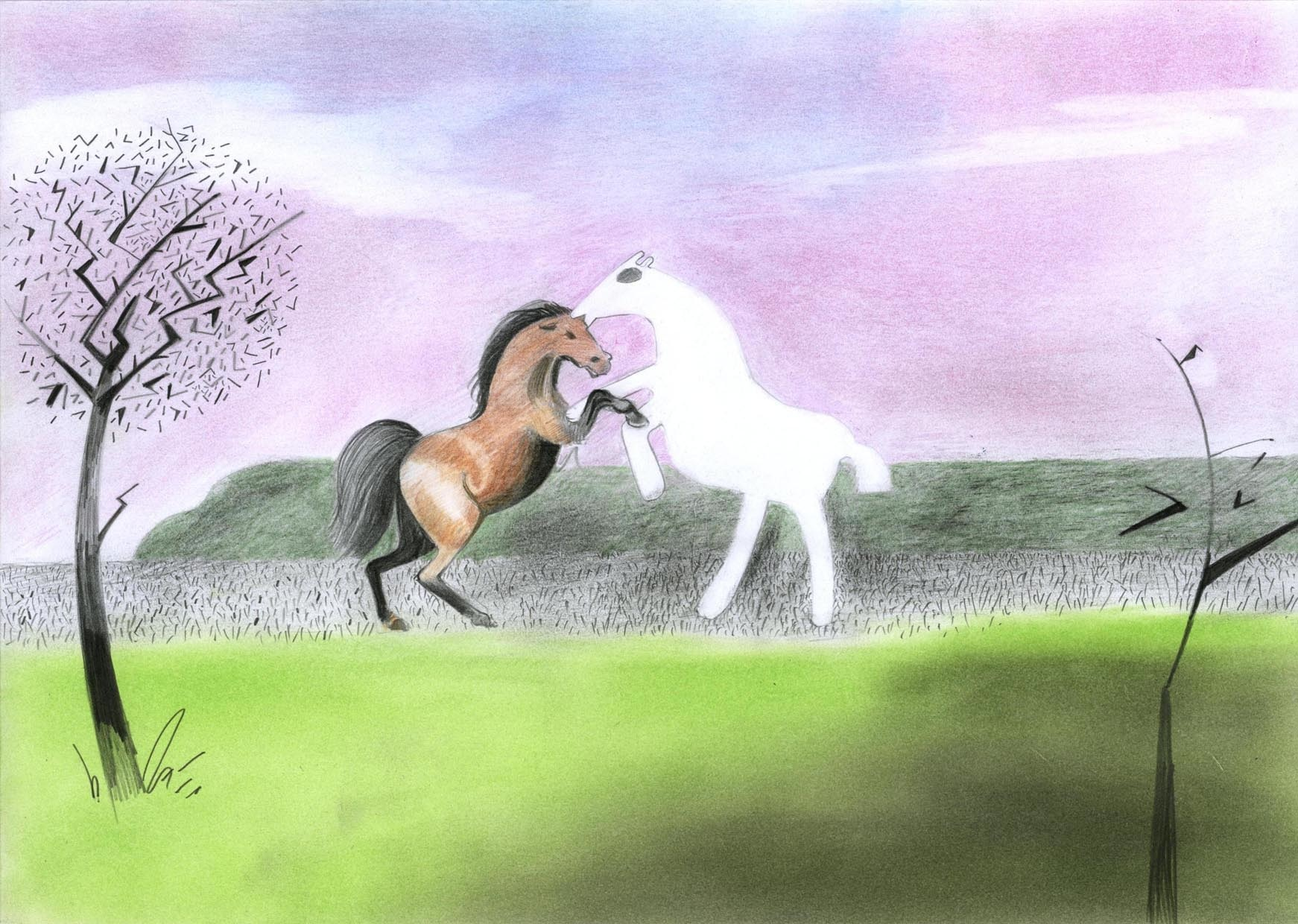
The Kiss, with apologies to George Stubbs, White Horses, Zillah Bell Gallery, Thirsk, 2009.

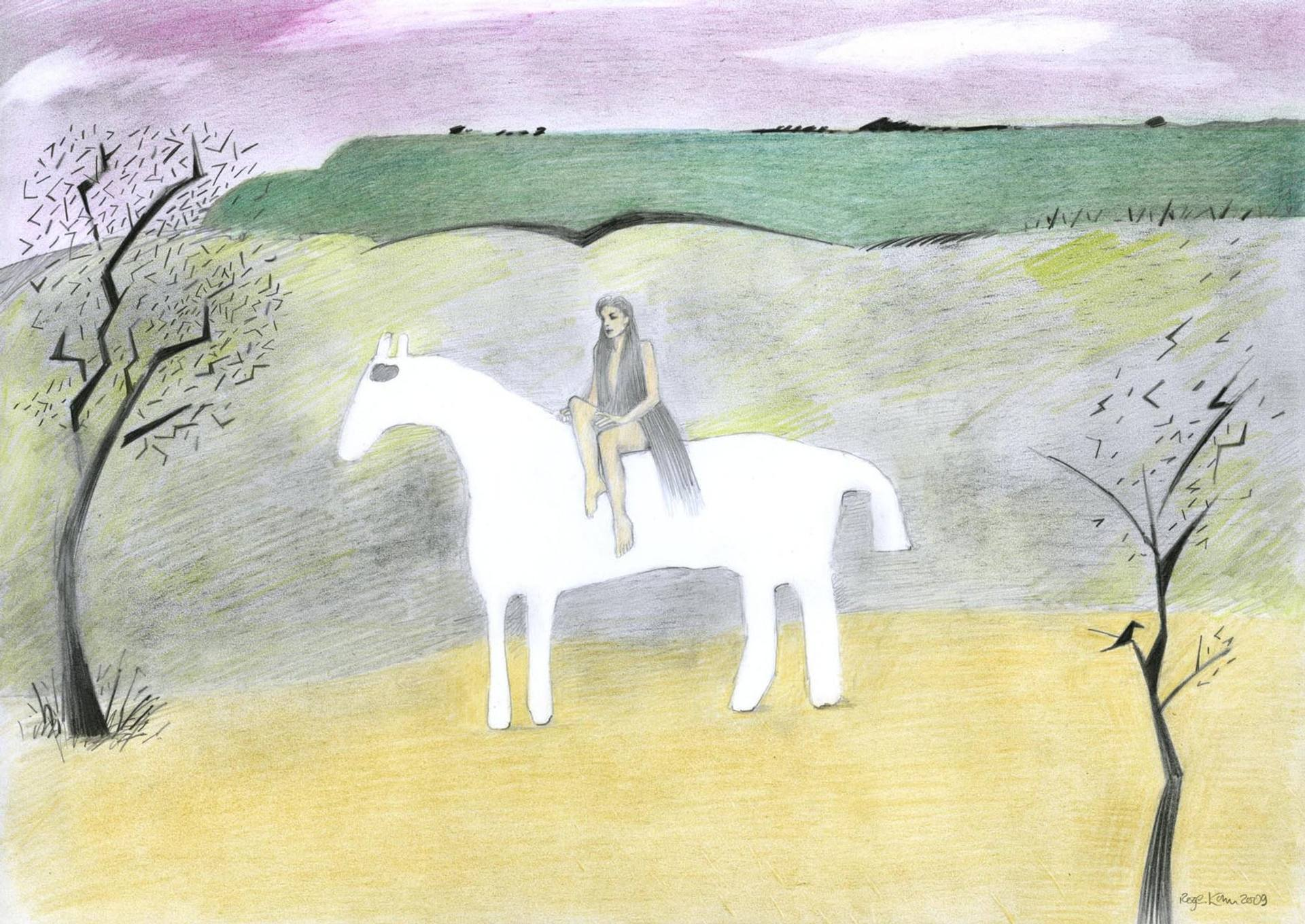
Lady with Hairpiece, White Horses, Zillah Bell Gallery, Thirsk, 2009.

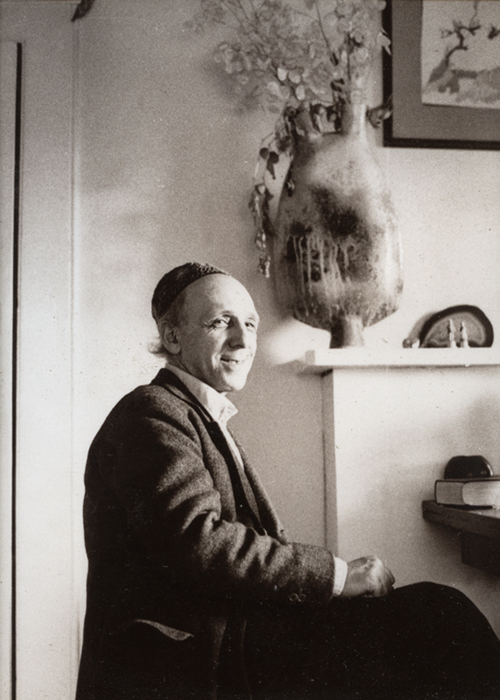
Ivor Cutler at his flat in Laurier Road, N.London, 1973.
