= Aleksandar M. Lukic =

Aleksandar M. Lukić
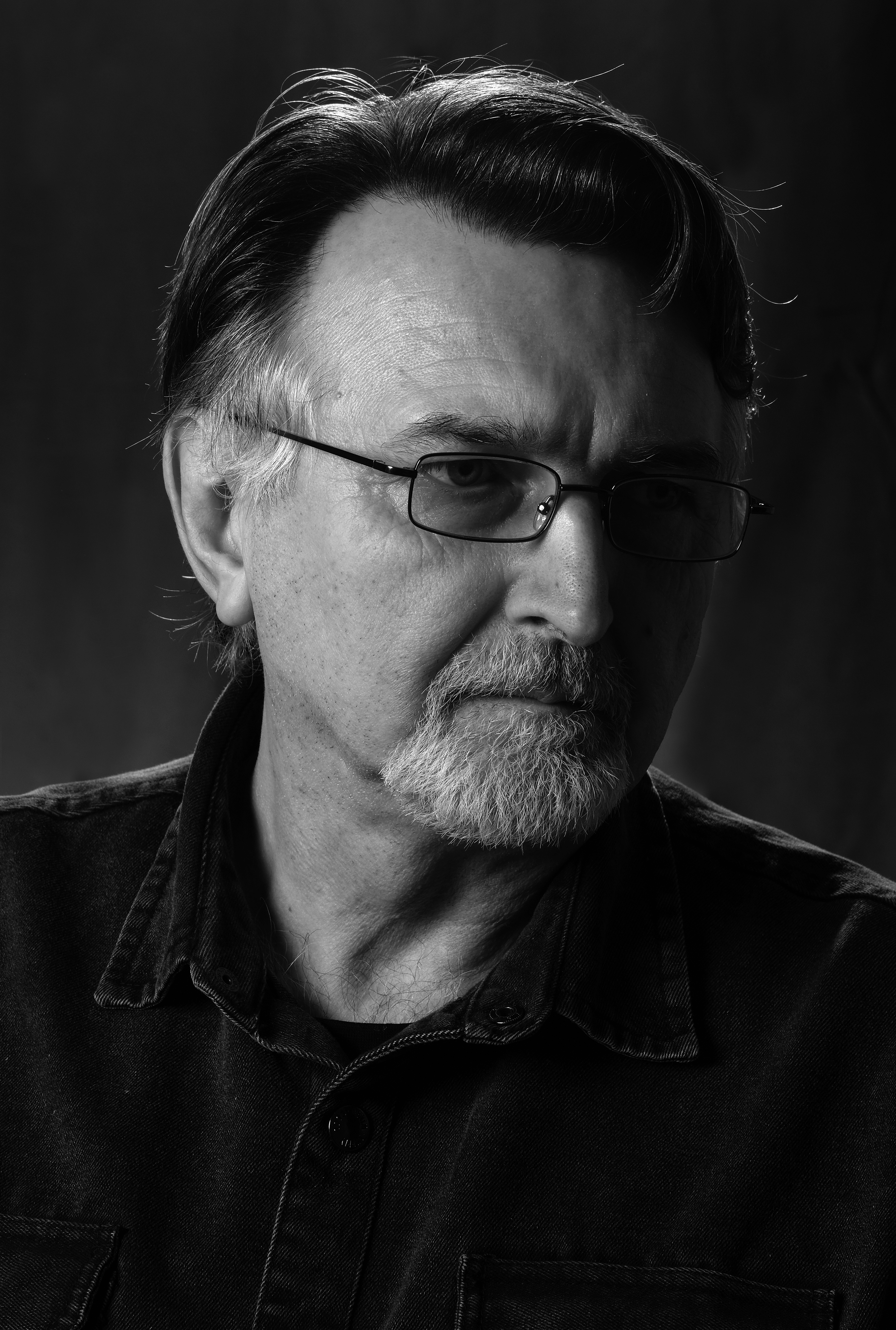
- Born: 1964 (age 61–62); Sremska Mitrovica, SR Serbia, SFR Yugoslavia
- Citizenship: Serbia
- Occupations: stained glass artist, kiln-formed glass artist
- Known for: stained glass, kiln-formed glass

Aleksandar M. Lukić (born 1964) is a Serbian stained glass and kiln-formed glass artist based in Subotica. He has been a member of the Association of Visual Artists of Applied Arts and Designers of Vojvodina (UPIDIV) since 2008 and the Association of Visual Artists of Applied Arts and Designers of Serbia (ULUPUDS) since 2018.

== Career ==
Lukić works primarily in stained glass and kiln-formed glass techniques. His work has been exhibited internationally, including at the Smithsonian Institution in Washington, D.C. (2016), and with the Contemporary Glass Society in the United Kingdom.

He has completed commissions for religious architecture throughout Serbia and internationally, including stained glass installations in Orthodox churches.

In 2010, his work was featured in the book Creative Glass, published by Schiffer Publishing in the United States. His work is recognized by Homo Faber, an initiative by the Michelangelo Foundation for Creativity and Craftsmanship.

== Exhibitions ==
Lukić has exhibited at the Smithsonian Institution in Washington, D.C. (2016), and participated in exhibitions with the Contemporary Glass Society in the United Kingdom (2021, 2023), and the International Glass Biennial in Sofia, Bulgaria (2023).

He has also held solo exhibitions at museums in Serbia, including the National Museum in Užice (2015), National Museum in Pančevo (2014), and RTS Gallery in Belgrade (2018, 2022).
