= Zillah Bell Contemporary Art =

Art gallery in Thirsk, England

Zillah Bell Art Gallery
- Established: 1988
- Location: Thirsk, England
- Coordinates: 54.23285°N 1.34421°W
- Type: Art gallery
- Owner: John Bell
- Website: www.zillahbellgallery.co.uk

Listed Building – Grade II
- Designated: 15 June 1984
- Reference no.: 1190496

The Zillah Bell Art Gallery is a contemporary art gallery exhibiting local and national artists. Housed in a Grade II Listed Building in Thirsk, North Yorkshire, England, the gallery opened in 1988.

== History ==
The gallery is owned and run by John Bell. It was set up in 1988 by Bell and partner Janie, and shares its name with Bell's youngest daughter, Zillah. The gallery, one of a row of 18th century Grade II listed cottages, is located at 15 Kirkgate in Thirsk, North Yorkshire. Daisy Bell, daughter of John and Janie, organised the Art of Care auction of postcards in 2005, which raised c. £73,000 in aid of Care International. Artists who provided works included Sir Paul McCartney, David Hockney, Tracey Emin and Damien Hirst. In 2015 the artist Norman Ackroyd called for the gallery to be a northern art hub, stating it is "beautiful for hanging prints".

== Exhibitions ==
In 1996 the surrealist artist and writer Anthony Earnshaw exhibited at the gallery with Another G&T. In both 2015 and 2017 the gallery hosted an exhibition of a number of works from that year's Royal Academy Summer Exhibition, intending to increase accessibility of art to people in the North of England. The prints were selected by etcher and Royal Academician Norman Ackroyd.

In 2016 the gallery hosted an exhibition, Juxtaposition, that focused on the "infinite possibilities of printmaking". It was curated by Sarah Greenslade and featured works by established and new artists, including Barbara Rae and Emma Stibbon.

== Artist's list ==
- Anthony Earnshaw – Another G&T (1996).
- Roger Kohn – Hung Drawn and Slaughtered (2003).
- Norman Ackroyd – Shetland (2012), Skellig Revisited (2015).
- Austin Wright – A Sculptor’s Drawings (2013).
- Debbie Loane – Straying from the Path (2020).
- James Naughton – A Journey in Paint (2023).

== Gallery ==
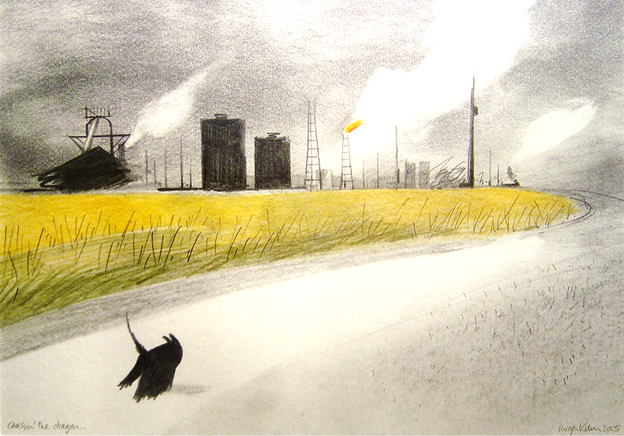
Chasin' the Dragon by Roger Kohn, created for the exhibition on Paddy's Hole, 2005.

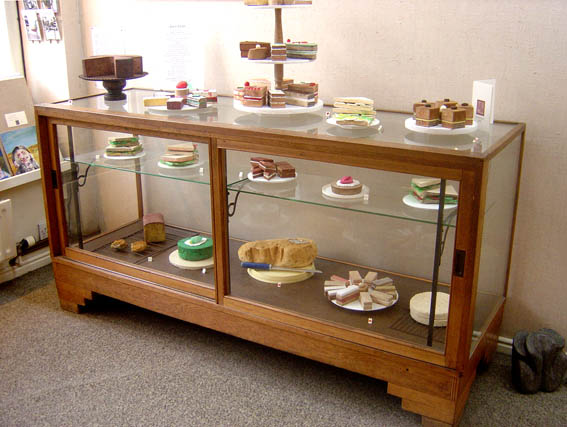
Cabinet of Cakes by David Winfield.

== See also ==
- Thirsk Hall Sculpture Park
