= Famine Memorial (Dublin) =

Memorial in Dublin, Ireland

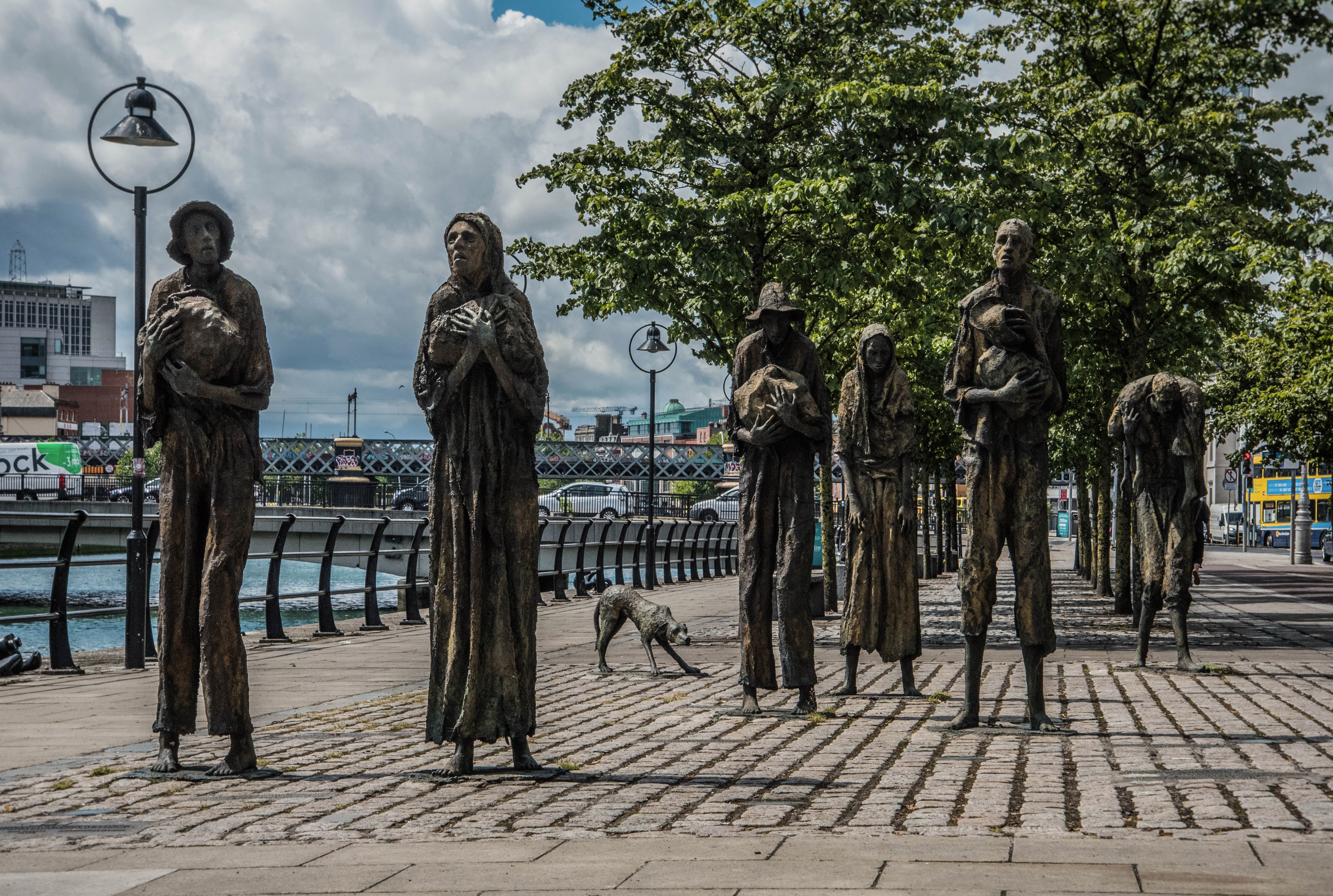
- Interactive map of Famine Memorial
- Location: Customs House Quay, Dublin, Ireland
- Coordinates: 53.348044°N 6.250056°W

The Famine Memorial, officially titled Famine, is a memorial in Dublin, Ireland made by Rowan Gillespie. The memorial, which stands on Customs House Quay, is in remembrance of the Great Famine (1845–1852), which saw the population of the country halved through death and emigration.

The installation consists of six tall bronze figures that are depicted in harrowing states of despair. They are depicted as walking towards a ship at the docks, carrying the little they had.

== History ==
The memorial was created by Rowan Gillespie, and presented to the city of Dublin in 1997. Rowan Gillespie attended art schools for sculptures and has been growing his reputation throughout numerous conventions and other projects. Gillespie then started to work on site specific sculptures, like the Famine Memorial. Gillespie also worked on a companion piece, The Arrival, which was unveiled in Toronto, Canada in 2007.

The 1990s experienced a surge of famine memorials. The 150th anniversary of the Great Famine was in 1995, though anticipation began in the mid 1980s. Many local organizations began working on famine projects, such as Action from Ireland (AfrI). Action from Ireland is a non-profit organization that launched the "Great Famine Project" in 1984. The government would respond to this by creating a National Famine Commemoration Fund to support building monuments and other activities related to commemorating the "Great Famine." However, many of the memorials erected were made through small organizations such as the Famine Memorial in Dublin.

The Dublin memorial was commissioned by Norma Smurfit to acknowledge the Irish diaspora and people who died from the Famine. Moreover, the memorial contributed to Norma Smurfit creating the Irish Famine Commemoration Fund, which receives funding through donors and redistributes it to famine projects or charities that support the needy.

In 1999, the Canadian Prime Minister, Jean Chretein, visited the memorial. His purpose was to unveil a commemorative plaque for the memorial. The plaque is in English and French, and reads:

"In memory of the victims of the Great Famine, and for their descendants who have done so much to build Canada."

In 2019, when Donald Trump, president of the United States, planned to visit Ireland, Irish Senator O'Riordan held an "Irish Stand" vigil at the memorial as part of an anti-racism campaign. He also spoke out against Trump's anti-immigration policies, and claims that Trump is not welcomed in Ireland.

== Interpretations ==
The Famine Memorial is designed to commemorate the people who suffered during the Great Famine. However, the memorial has also been repurposed for other goals, or interpreted as something else.

The memorial was placed at the Custom House Quay, near the Jeanie Johnston. This spot was chosen because it was where many immigrants left Ireland in search of a better home.

The memorial demonstrates the struggles and hardship faced by the Irish during the famine, though, it does not represent any of the causes of the famine. So while the memory of political hardship is known and remains, the memorial can be seen as avoiding that side of the Famine and representing the heritage and cultural aspects of it.

However, there is also some backlash against the memorial for allowing the people who donate money to have their family name engraved into a plaque for the memorial. Duke University Press says that:

"The gesture was controversial, interpreted by some as an attempt to link surviving generations with the legacy of the Famine, while others saw the plaques as a callous commercialization of history."

Many activists viewed this as only large corporations being able to donate enough money to engrave their names, and as means of "boosting their egos." The other side of this argument is that in order to maintain the monument, and allow the memory of the immigrants to continue, is that the donations of larger corporations is needed or else there would not be enough money for upkeep.

== Images and features ==
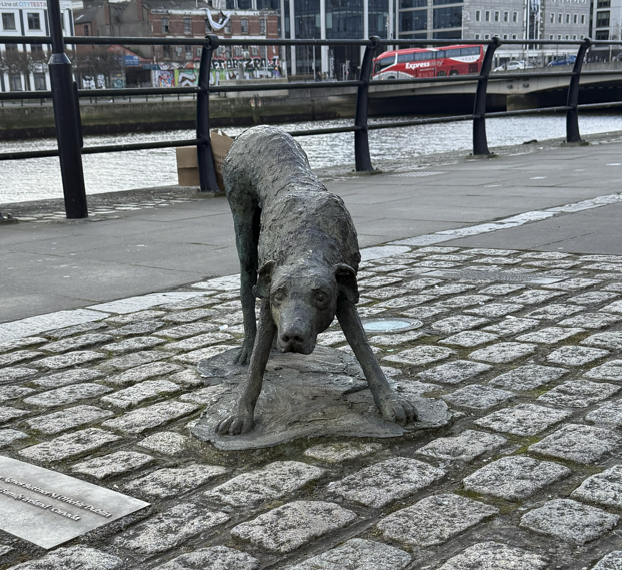
Statue of a dog from the Dublin Famine Memorial

The Famine Memorial is designed to commemorate the people who suffered. Important features of this monument are that of a man carrying a child, a lone woman, and a dog with its head down. These images express the starvation and loneliness experienced by families trying to survive during the famine.

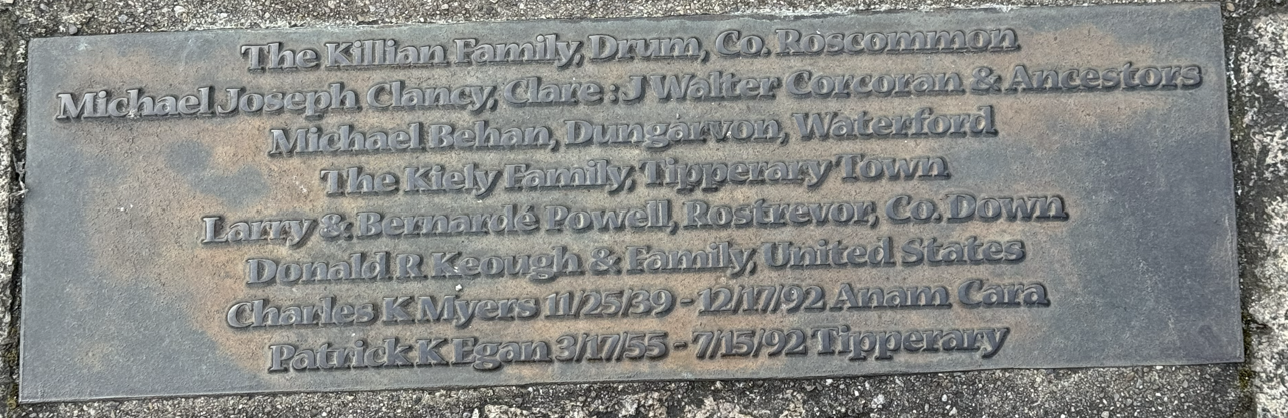
Plaque of Irish Family Names from the Dublin Famine Memorial

Previously mentioned, there are the plaques that have family names inscribed on them. There are multiple of these plaques around the memorial that demonstrate the amount of families that struggled during this period.

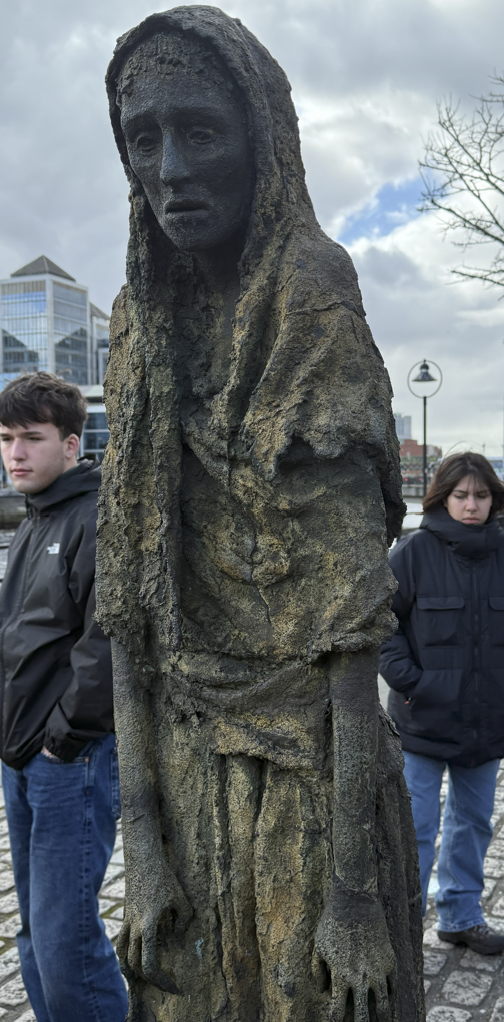
Statue of a woman from the Dublin Famine Memorial

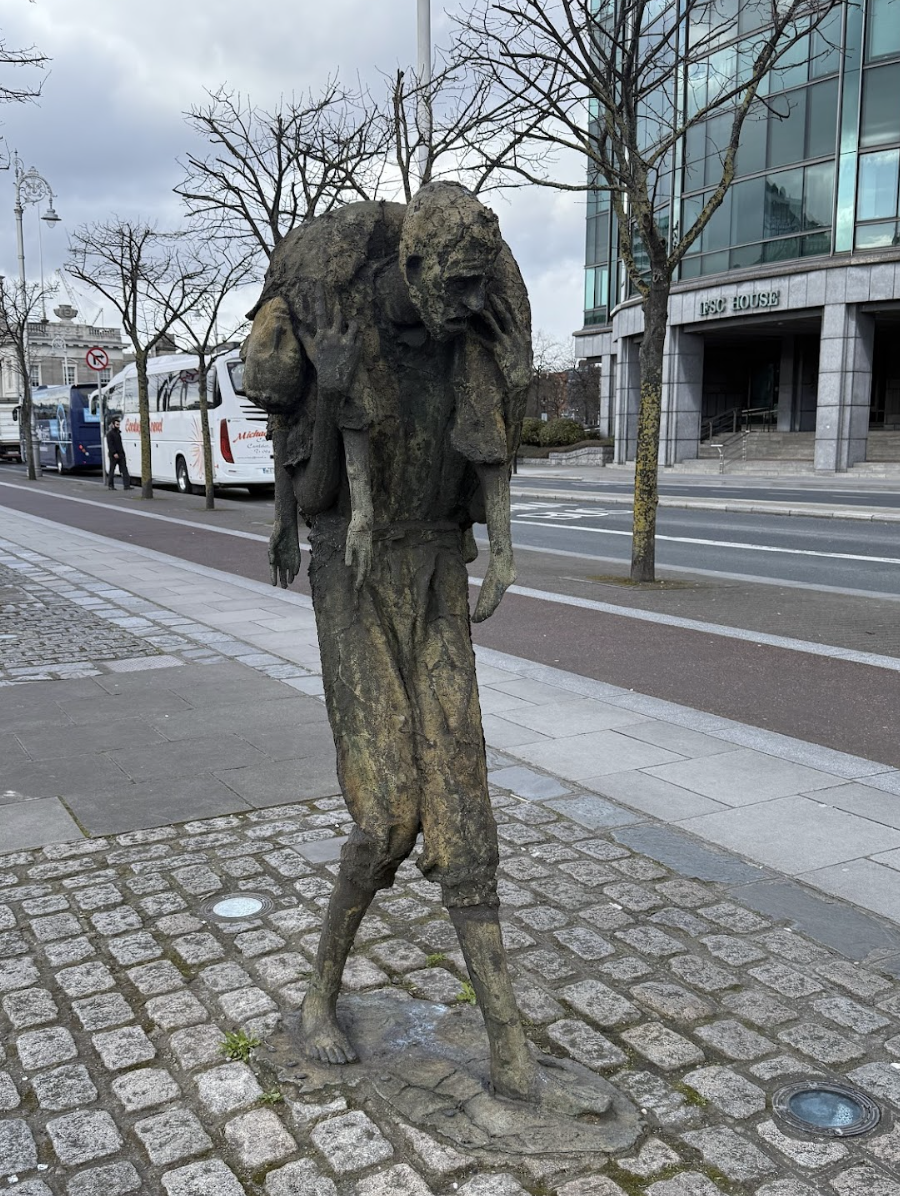
Statue of man carrying a child from the Dublin Famine Memorial
