= Rowan Gillespie =

Irish sculptor

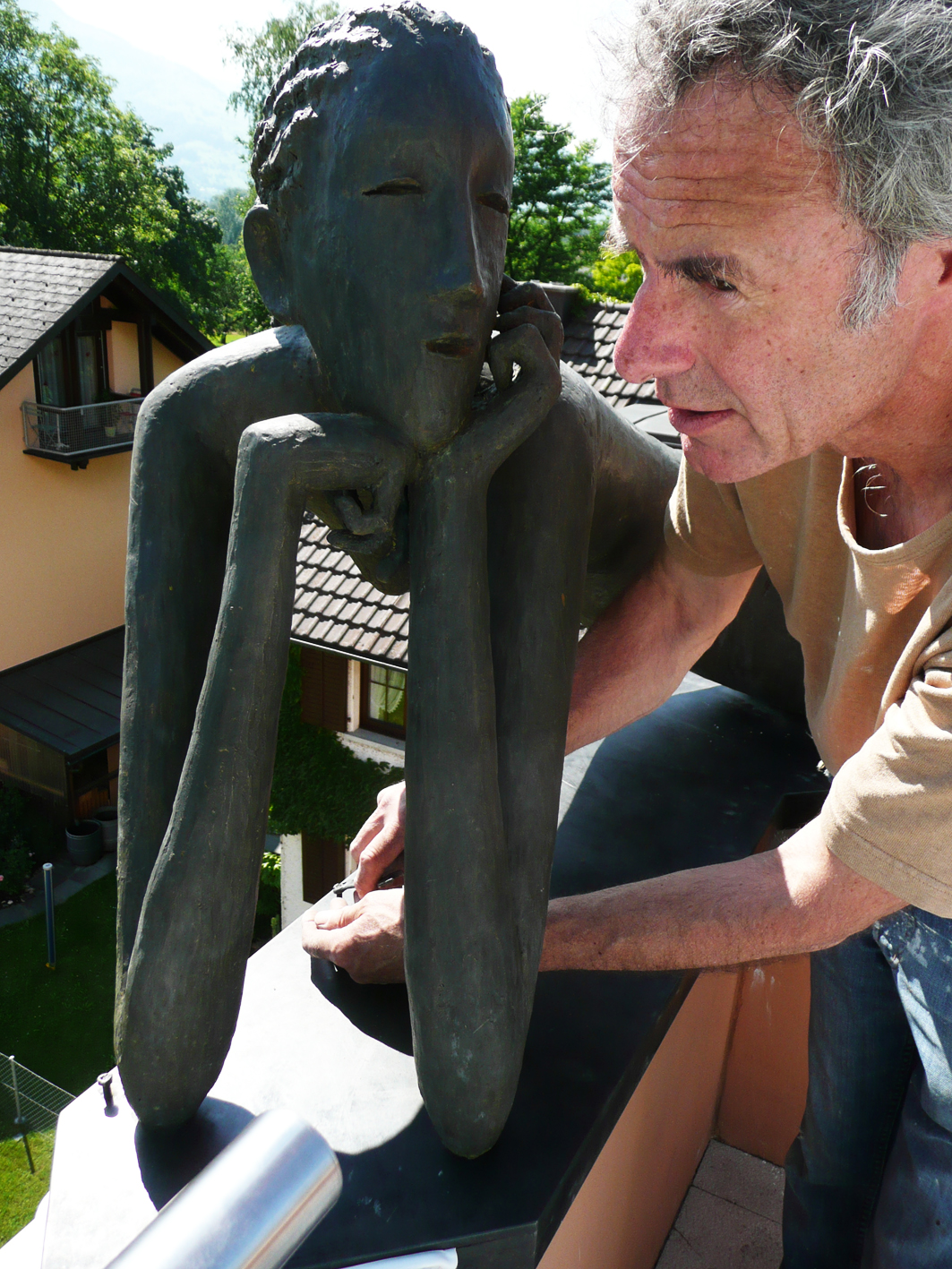
- Rowan Gillespie, on site in Liechtenstein, June 2008
- Born: Rowan Fergus Meredith Gillespie; 1953 (age 72–73); Blackrock, Ireland
- Education: York School of Art; Kingston College of Art
- Known for: Bronze casting sculpture
- Notable work: Yeats, Famine, James Joyce, Proclamation

Rowan Fergus Meredith Gillespie (born 1953) is an Irish bronze casting sculptor of international renown. Born in Dublin to Irish parents, Gillespie spent his formative years in Cyprus.

From conception to creation, he works alone in his purpose-built bronze casting foundry at Clonlea, in Blackrock. His method of artmaking makes him unique among the bronze casting community.

Influenced by the sculptor Henry Moore and the painter Edvard Munch, Gillespie uses the lost wax casting process to portray human emotions. Having worked almost exclusively on site-specific art since 1996, Gillespie's public works can be found in his native Ireland, Europe, the United States, and Canada.

== Background ==
His father, Jack Gillespie, was a medical doctor and his mother, Moira, was the daughter of James Creed Meredith, the translator of Immanuel Kant's Critique of Judgement, a Supreme Court of Ireland judge, and a member of the Irish Volunteers. According to Gillespie's official biographer Roger Kohn, the sculptor's work, Proclamation, sited across the road from Kilmainham Gaol in Dublin, was created in memory of both the Proclamation of the Irish Republic and of his grandfather's dream of a Utopian society.

== Education and career ==
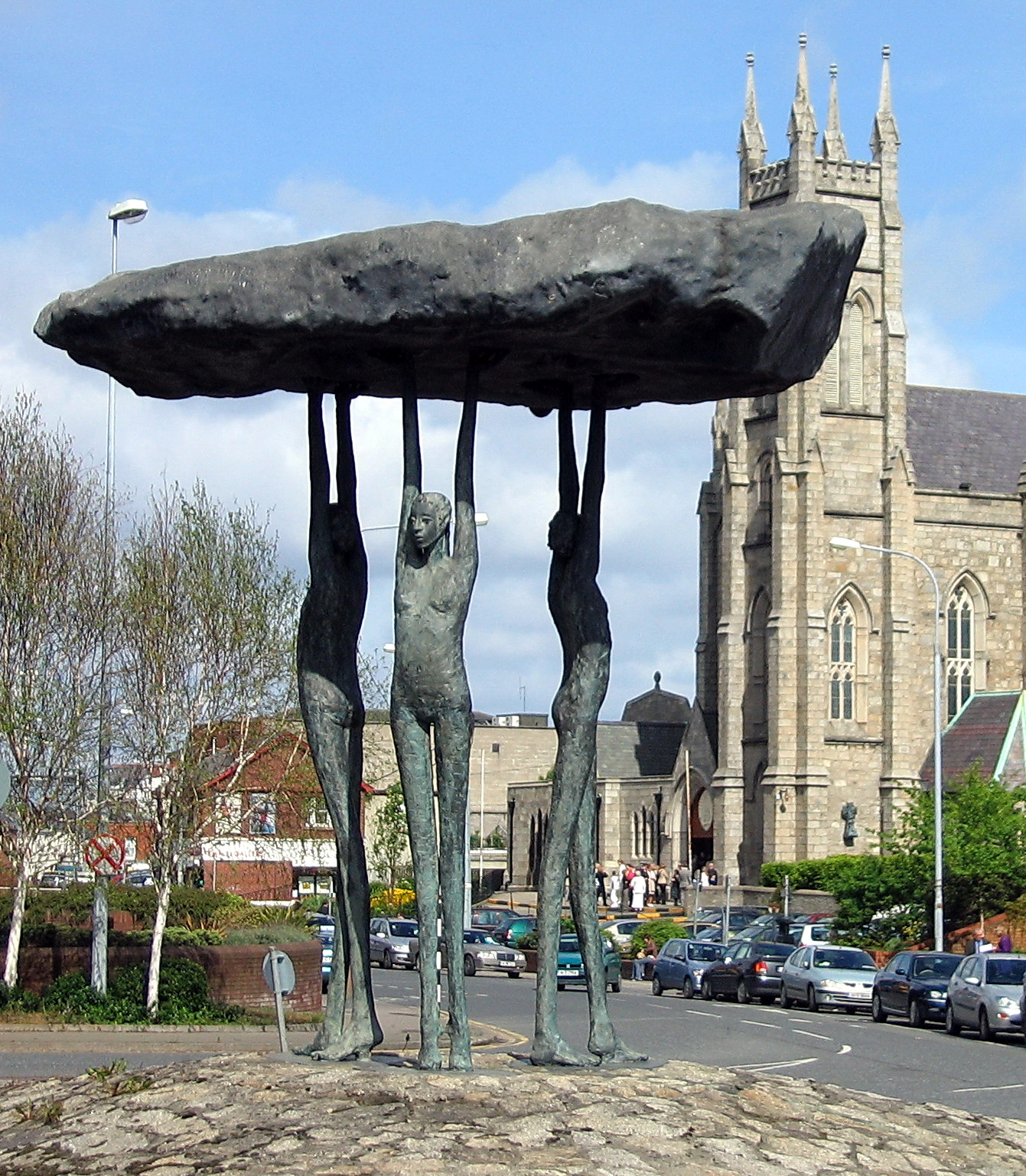
"Blackrock Dolmen" (1987)

At the age of seven, he was sent to boarding school in England, although the family remained in Cyprus until he was ten. In 1969, he attended York School of Art where he was first introduced to the lost-wax casting process by the bronze sculptor Sally Arnup. Here he also met his wife-to-be, Hanne, who runs the Clonlea Yoga Studio in Blackrock. In 1970, he attended Kingston College of Art where he was tutored by woodcarver John Robson and through whom he met, and was encouraged by, Henry Moore.

Following his studies at York and Kingston, he completed his studies at the Statens Kunstole in Oslo. He lectured for three years at the Munch Museum, the Norwegian painter having a profound influence on him. Munch remains the great artistic influence on him up to the present day.

At the age of 21, he married Hanne; they had their first child, Alexander and he held his first solo exhibition in Norway. In 1977 he returned to Dublin where he set up his foundry/workshop and established himself in the years between 1977 and 1995 with solo exhibitions at the Solomon Gallery in Dublin, arts fairs, and numerous group shows throughout Europe and the United States. He then decided to concentrate on site specific art, notably The Cycle of Life, Colorado (1991); The Famine Series, Dublin (1996/7); and Ripples of Ulysses 2000/1.

In 2007, he was awarded an honorary Doctorate in Fine Arts by Regis University in Denver, Colorado.

== Recent developments ==
=== Sculpting life ===
In 2007, Shane Brennan and Tom Burke of Moondance Productions released a film biography on Gillespie's life and work, called Sculpting Life.

The film received critical acclaim following its first broadcast on the Irish channel, RTÉ. The film, also aired on the Arts Channel in New Zealand, portrays the sculptor as he creates a series of famine sculptures from research through to unveiling in Ireland Park, Toronto. Partly based on his reading of Joseph O'Connor's novel, Star of the Sea, Gillespie enters the world of its central character, the murderous Pius Mulvey as he haunts the decks of a coffin ship and becomes an emaciated ghost, living among the hundreds of Irish emigrants crammed into steerage. The documentary follows the sculptor as he brings the character to life in bronze.

=== Looking for Orion ===
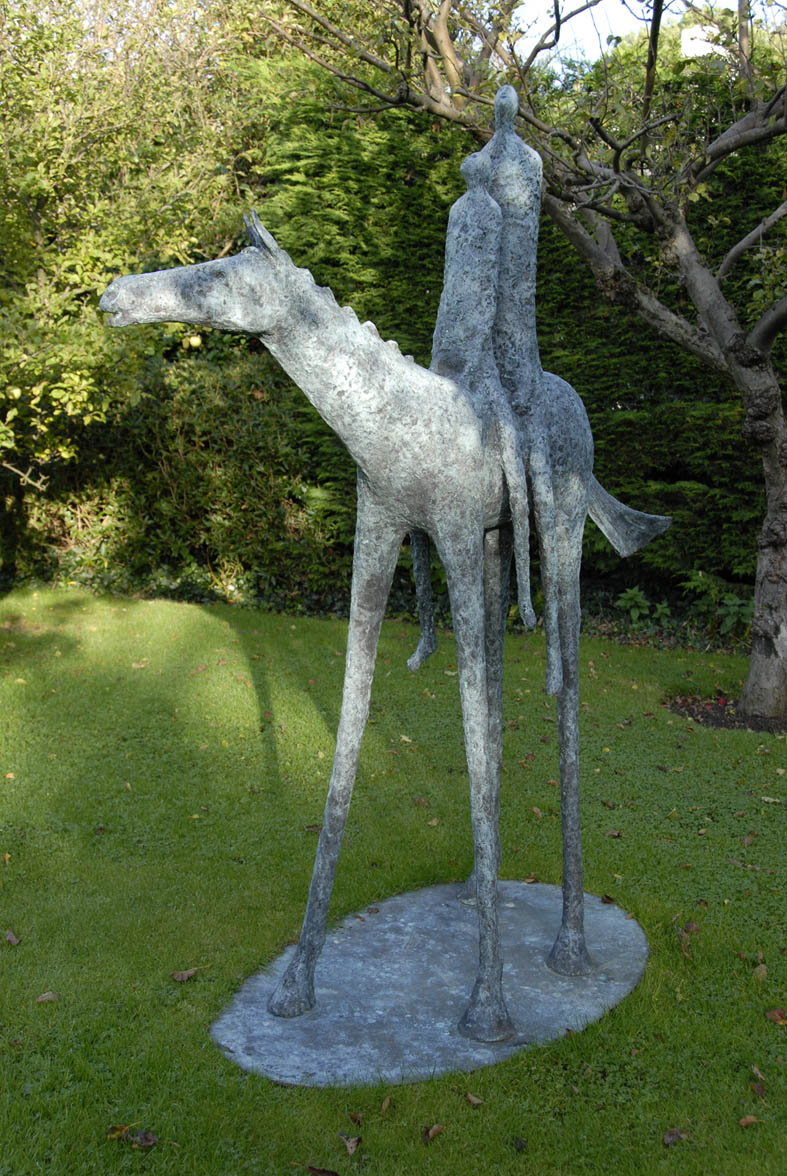
"Looking for Orion" at Clonlea Studio 2007

More recently, an artistic biography Looking for Orion by Gillespie's lifelong friend, the artist and publisher Roger Kohn, provides an insider's view of Gillespie. The biography documents his contributions to his art over the last 36 years, and explores the influences of Edvard Munch and Henry Moore on the artist.

Gillespie is unique among the bronze casting fraternity in being able to claim that all moulding, casting and finishing are done entirely by himself in his Dublin studio/foundry. In addition, all installations are either carried out or supervised by him.

== Themes ==
The Irish Famine and subsequent catastrophic migration have motivated two of Gillespie's works. In several of his site specific pieces, such as Famine (1997) on the Custom House Quay in Dublin, his life-sized human figures are emaciated and haunting. In June 2007, a series of statues by Gillespie was unveiled by President Mary McAleese on the quayside in Toronto's Ireland Park. The work commemorates the arrival of refugees from the Great Famine. The Hamilton Spectator described the work as follows:

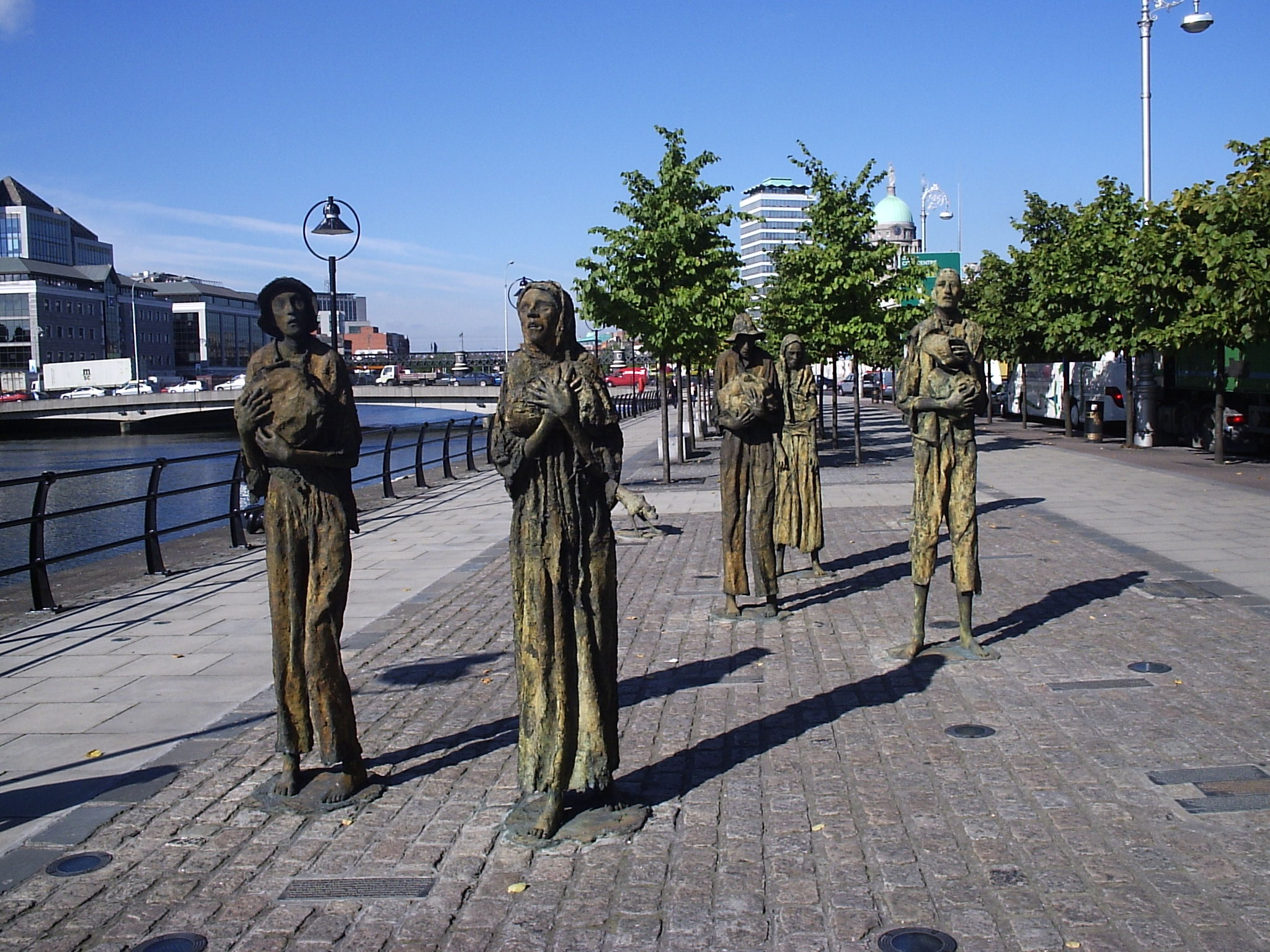
"Famine" (1997)

"The early immigrants are now honoured at the Toronto waterfront park by five haunting bronze statues created by Irish sculptor Rowan Gillespie.

One figure depicts a man lying on the ground, emaciated; another shows a pregnant woman clutching her bulging stomach, while behind her a meek child stands wide-eyed. One frail figure is bent over with hands clasped in prayer, contrasted by a man whose arms are extended to the sky in salvation."

In lesser-known, archived works such as Ambition and Aspiration, which climbs the wall of the Dublin Treasury Building, the artist reveals his sense of humour and somewhat different preoccupations. In his recent biography, an altogether different picture emerges. In his portrayals of James Joyce, William Butler Yeats, Samuel Beckett, Gerard Manley Hopkins, and Jesus Christ, Gillespie has undertaken his own spiritual and literary journey. His more conceptual and abstract pieces such as Looking at the Moon, The Kiss and the more recent, Proclamation, span the whole gamut of human emotions, from love and awe, to hate and self-destruction. As his biographer writes:

"Rowan's passionate and often draining encounters with his subjects, and his willingness to undergo personal transformation and rebirth in light of them, takes shape in the gnarled and volcanic textures of his later pieces. They stand before us as a mature, fully fledged portrait of an essentially rough-hewn and raw witness to the emotional turmoil of our time."

=== Proclamation ===
The original model for Proclamation was called Imagine, and according to Gillespie's biographer:

"it alluded not only to the John Lennon peace anthem, but also to the dreams for a utopian society in Ireland espoused by Rowan's grandfather, James Creed Meredith (1874-1942)".

Proclamation has, as its backdrop, the courthouse in which Meredith presided when he was a Circuit Court Judge. Fourteen figures stand in a megalithic circle, at the centre of which is a plaque containing a copy of the Proclamation of Independence, engraved in bronze. Each figure has at its base a small plaque, engraved with the name and the British military tribunal's verdict and sentence of death. The figures are perforated with bullet holes. Since the original commission was for the seven signatories of the Proclamation, Gillespie has donated the other seven martyrs to the site himself.

== Solo exhibitions ==
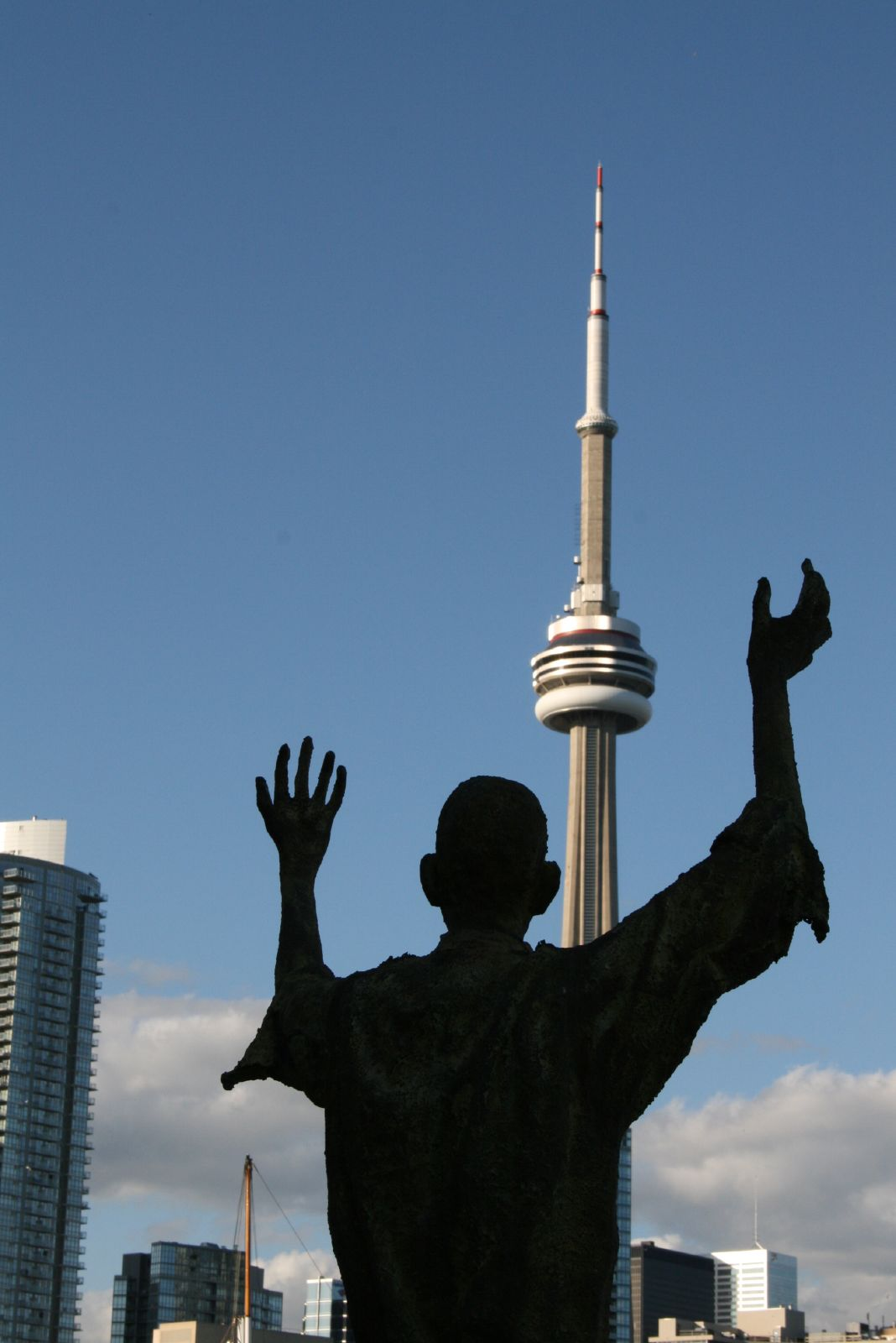
The Jubilant Man Famine Series 2007, Ireland Park, Toronto

- 1974 Moss Kunst Foreningen, Norway
- 1975 Galleri Cassandra, Norway
- 1976 Galleri Cassandra, Norway
- Lad Lane Gallery, Dublin
- 1977 Galleri 71 Tromso, Norway
- Bodo Kunst Foreningen, Norway
- Austin Hayes Gallery, York
- Lad Lane Gallery, Dublin
- 1978 Galleri Cassandra, Norway
- 1979 Alwin Gallery, London
- 1980 Lad Lane Gallery, Dublin
- 1981 Galerie Hüsstege, 's-Hertogenbosch
- 1982 The Solomon Gallery, Dublin
- Galleri Cassandra, Norway
- 1983 Puck Inaugural Exhibition, New York
- 1983 Poole Wills Gallery, New York
- 1984 The Solomon Gallery, Dublin
- 1986-88 Solomon Gallery, Dublin
- Galerie Hüsstege, 's-Hertogenbosch
- Jonathan Poole Gallery, London
- 1989 - 1994 Concentrated on site specific work
- 1994 - 95 Solomon Gallery, Dublin
- Galerie Hüsstege, 's-Hertogenbosch
- 1996 Decision to stop exhibition work in order to concentrate on site specific work.

== References and sources ==
Notes

Sources

- Kohn, Roger (28 September 2007). Rowan Gillespie - Looking for Orion. Dublin: O'Brien Press. p. 160. ISBN 1-84717-076-5.

== Gallery ==
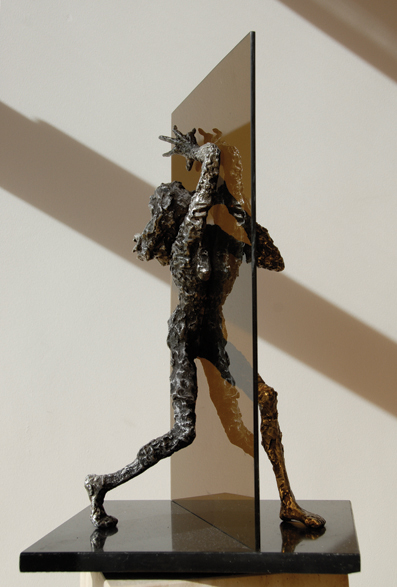
Dilemma (alloy and plexiglass), 1978. This sculpture is 53 cm tall. (Courtesy of Roger Kohn)

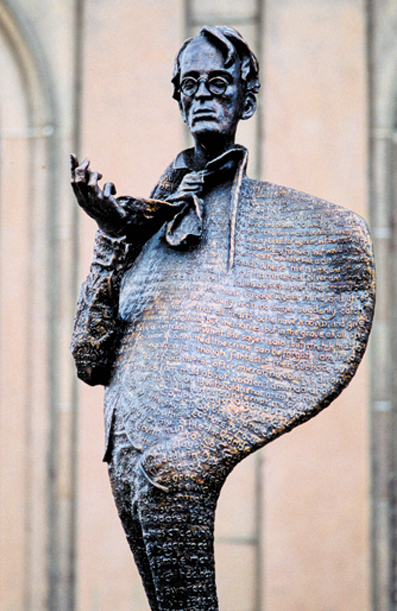
Yeats (bronze) 1990. 240 cm.

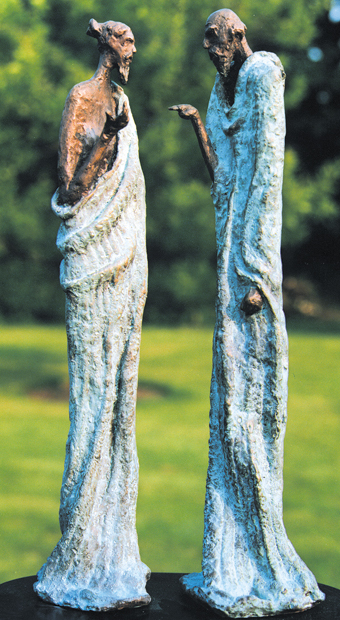
The Eternal Question, (bronze), 1991. 37 cm

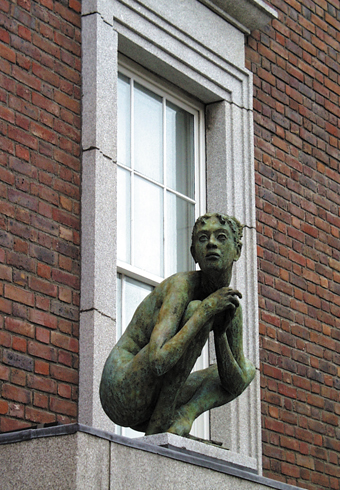
Birdy (bronze), 1997. Height 122 cm. Perched on the windowsill of 3, Crescent Hall, Mount Street, Dublin.

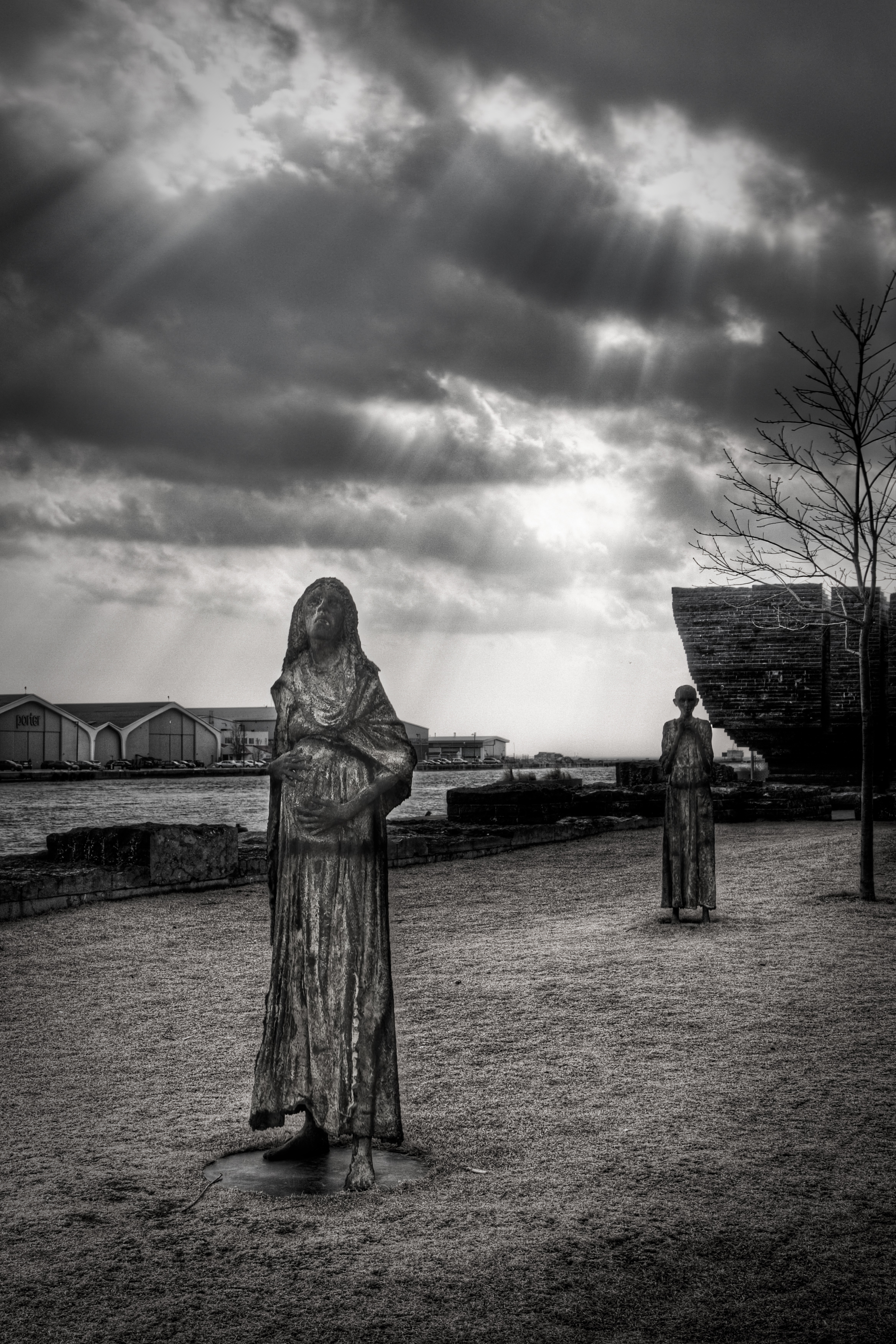
Rowan Gillespie's Great Famine memorial The Pregnant Woman in Ireland Park on Toronto's Harbourfront

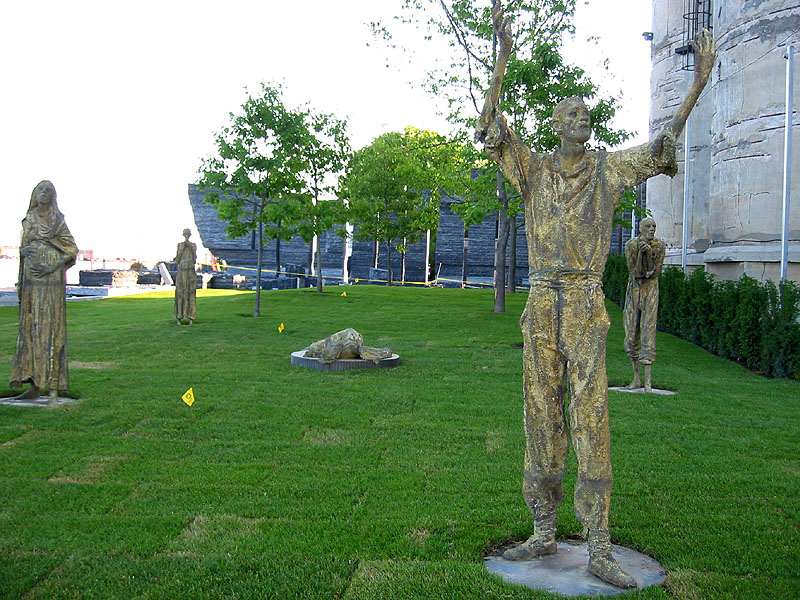
Great Famine memorial in Ireland Park, Toronto Harbourfront

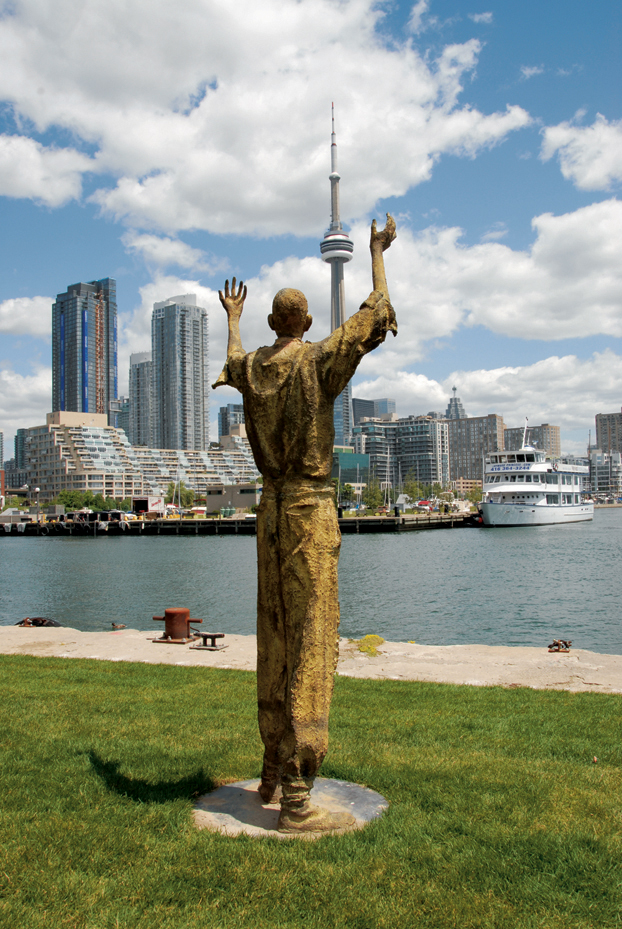
Migrants (bronze), 2007, Ireland Park, Toronto Harbourfront. The Jubilant Man stands 320 cm tall.

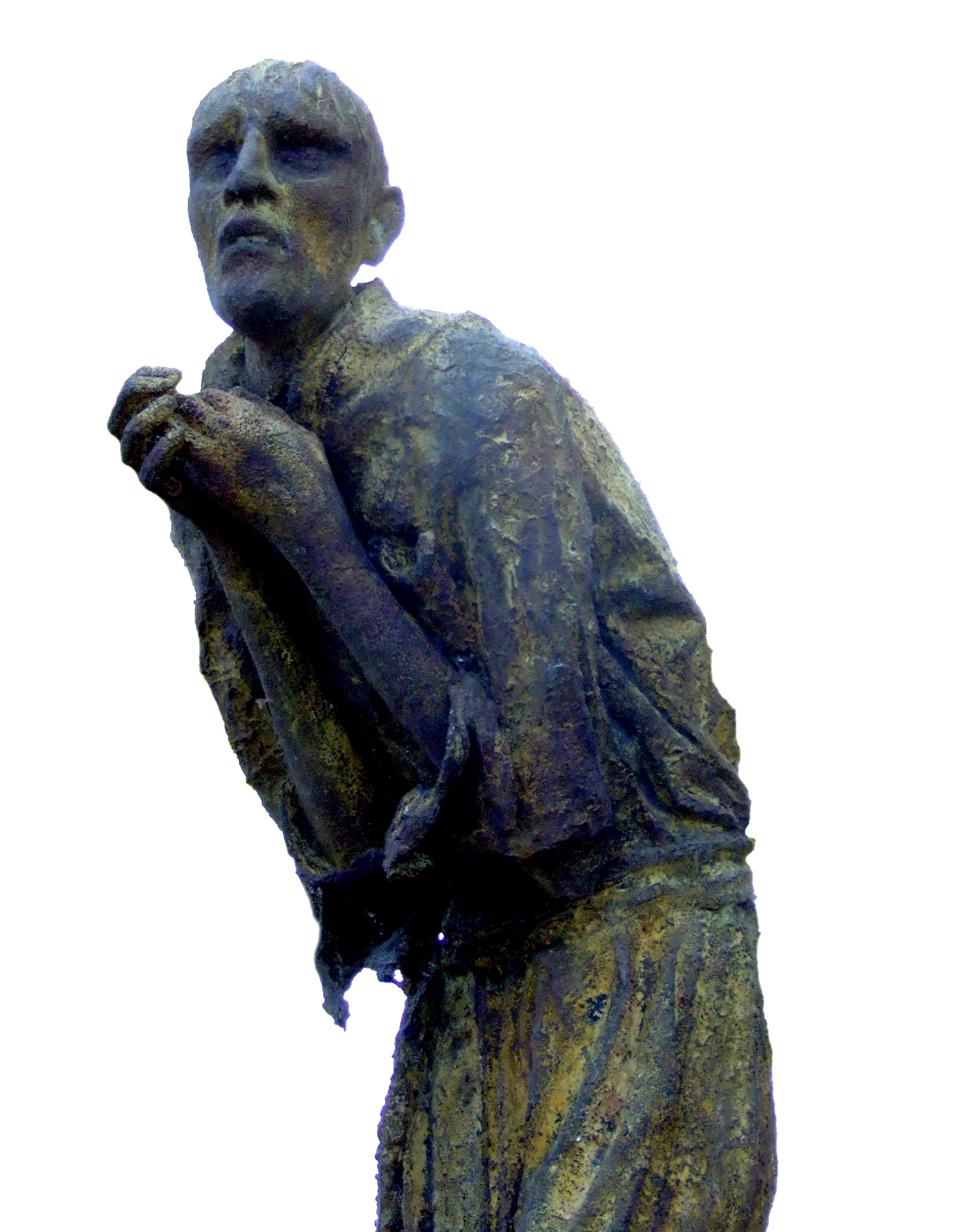
Rowan Gillespie's Great Famine memorial in Ireland Park, Toronto Harbourfront

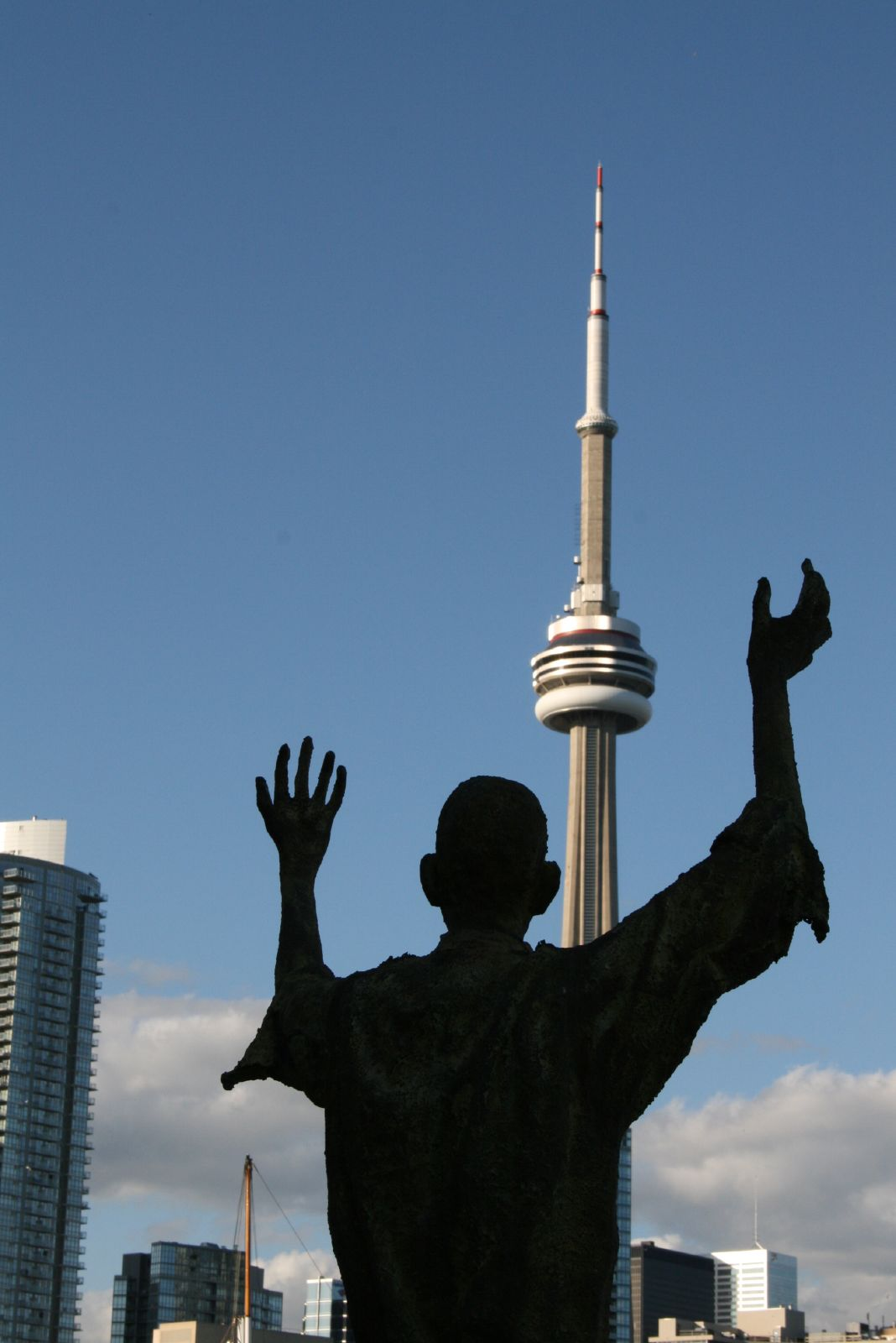
Detail of Rowan Gillespie's Great Famine memorial in Ireland Park, Toronto, Harbourfront

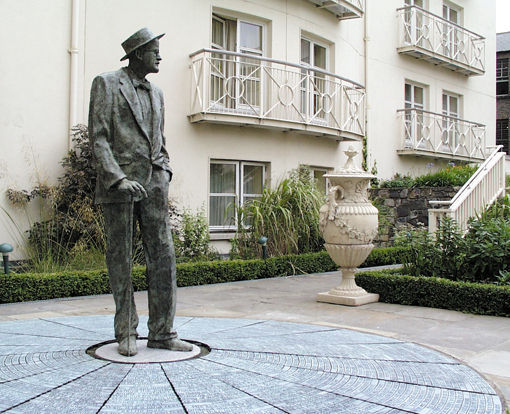
Ripples of Ulysses (bronze), 2000. Merrion Hotel, Dublin. 200 cm

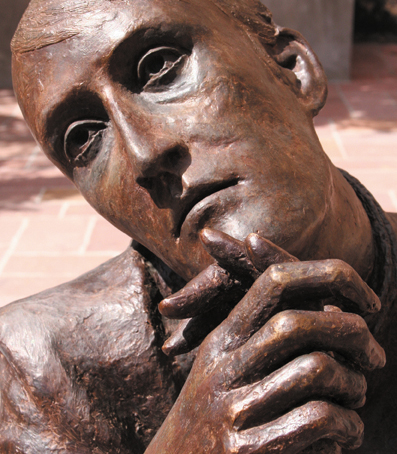
Gerard Manley Hopkins, (poet in bronze), 2005. Slightly larger than life-size. Regis University, Denver, Colorado.

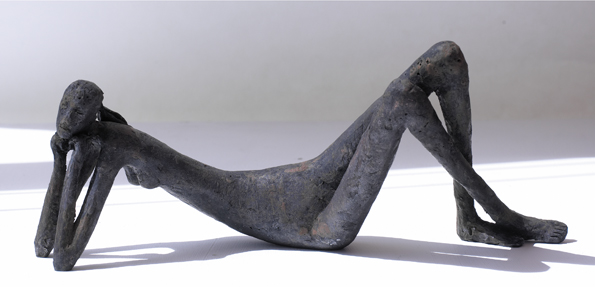
Lazy lady (bronze), 2005, 29 cm.

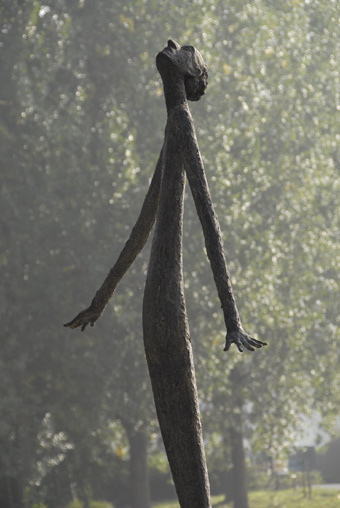
Rowan Gillespie's Looking at the Moon (bronze), 2001, Gouda, the Netherlands. Stands 335 cm tall.

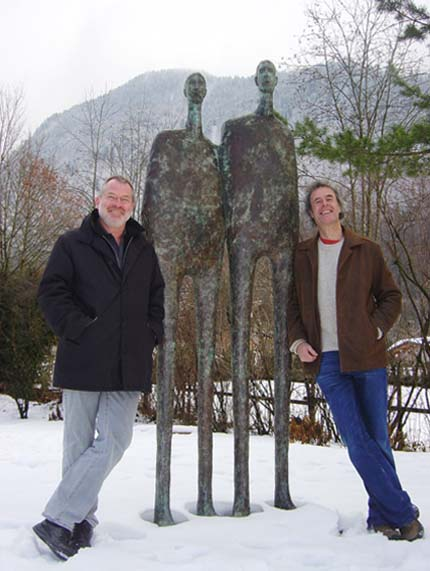
Looking Together with Helmut Kindle and the artist Rowan Gillespie, taken in Triesen 2006

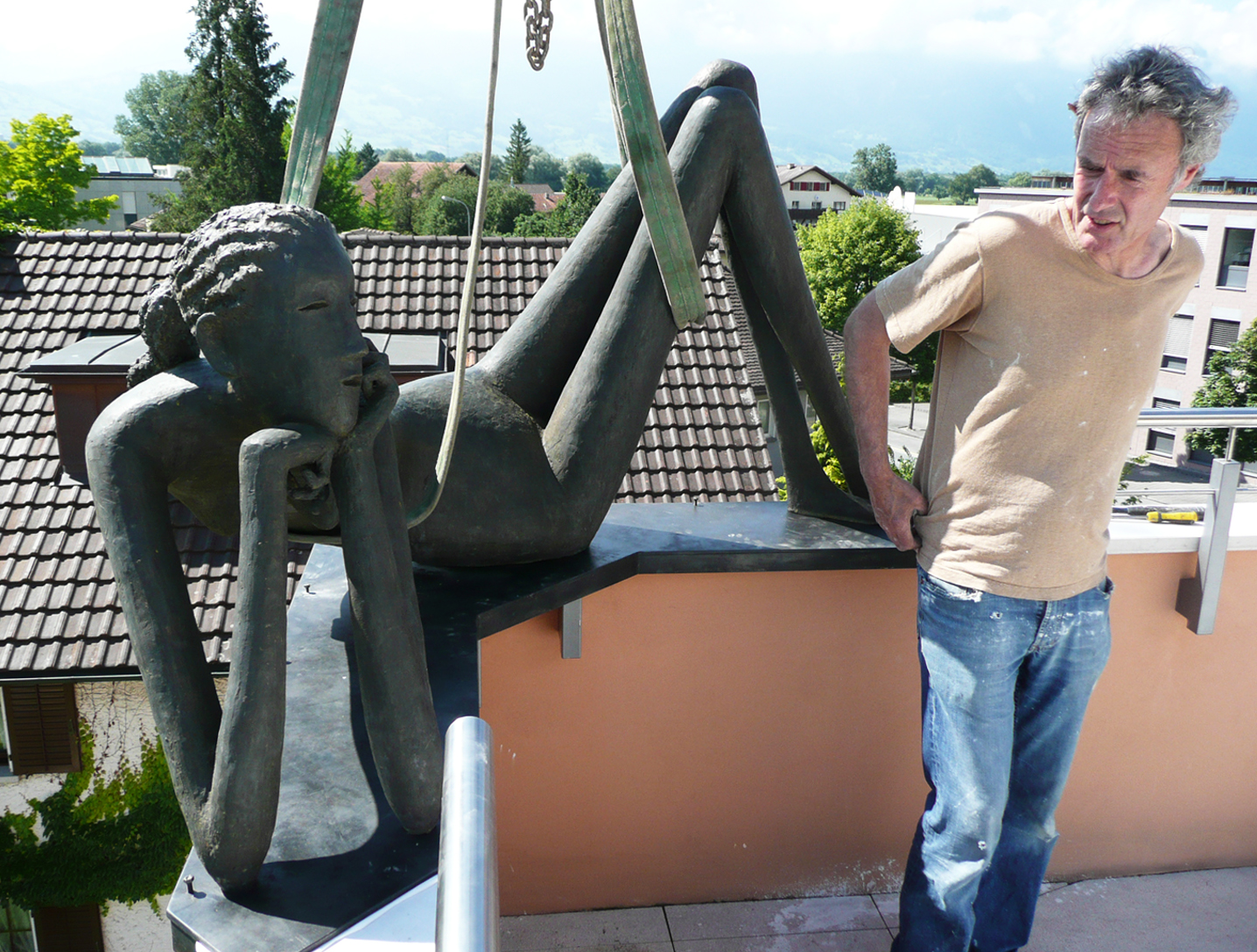
Lazy Lady with her creator in Liechtenstein, June 2008

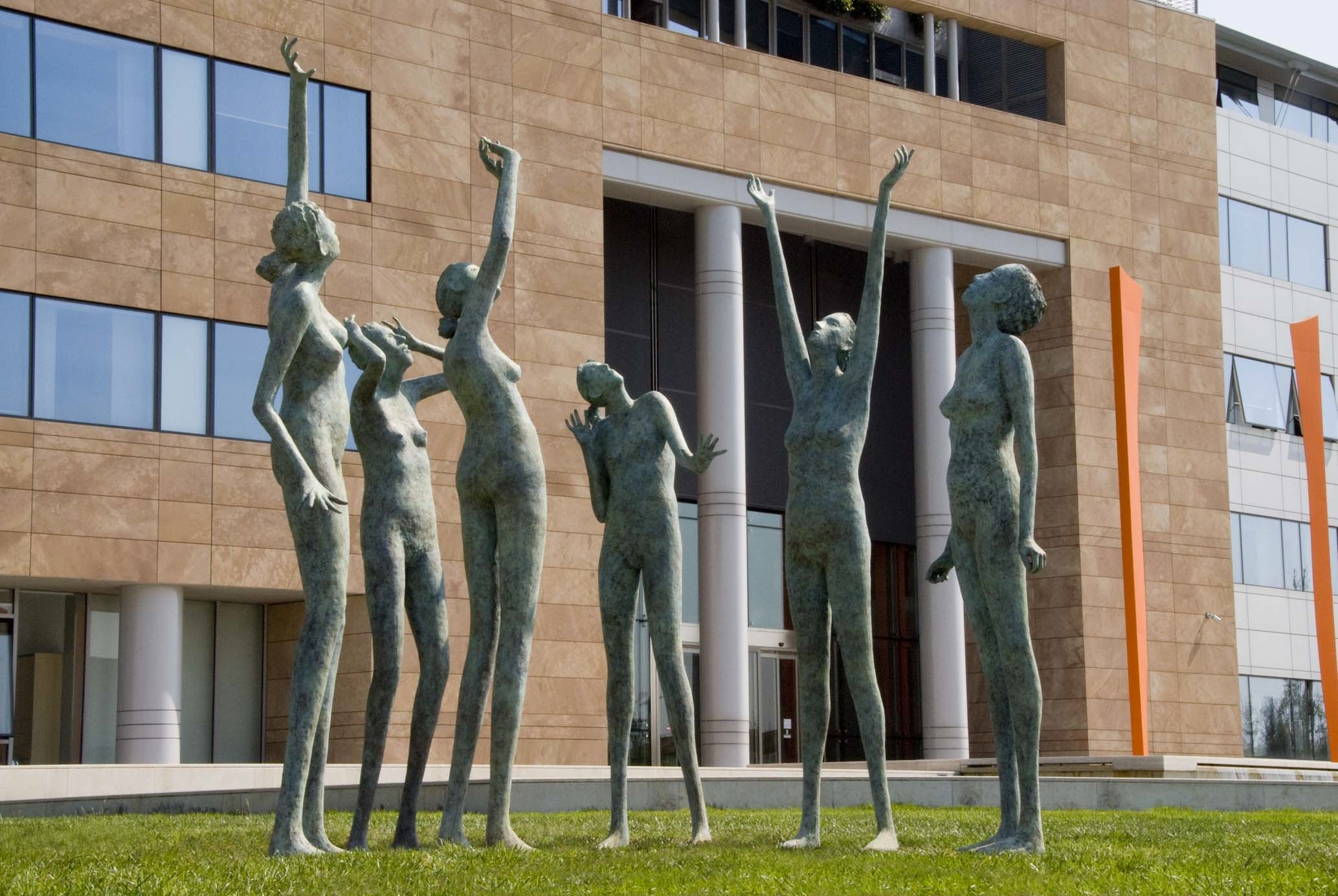
L'Eta Della Donna, Veneto Banca, Montebelluna-Treviso, Italy, 2009.
