= The Shining Levels =

Book by John Wyatt

- Author: John Wyatt
- Genre: Autobiography; Nature writing
- Publisher: Geoffrey Bles
- Publication date: 1973

The Shining Levels: The Story of a Man Who Went Back to Nature is an autobiographical book by John Wyatt. It was published by Geoffrey Bles in 1973.

== Background ==
In the book, Wyatt recounts his life as a forester on Cartmel Fell in the Southern Lake District in the early-1960s. Wyatt, born in 1925, grew up in the Cheshire mill town of Ashton-under-Lyne. As a boy he visited the Lake district with the Cub Scouts and fell in love with the area. After working as a copy boy for the Daily Telegraph in Manchester he applies for the post of forest worker in the lakes and finds himself living a very simple life having to build his own stove, etc. He adopts a roe deer fawn who lives with him in his woodkeeper's hut. The book describes his growing bond with nature. The title Shining Levels describes moments of great beauty that he came across unexpectedly in his everyday life.

Wyatt eventually became head warden of the Lake District National Park. He died in 2006 and is buried in a Lake district wood with a yew tree planted on his grave.
