= David Reekie =

English glass sculptor

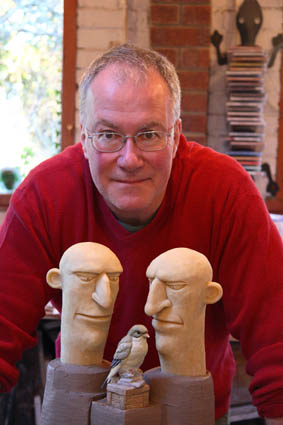
- David Reekie, 2007, courtesy of Duncan Reekie
- Born: David Reekie; 1947 (age 78–79); London Borough of Hackney
- Education: Stourbridge College of Art
- Known for: Glass Sculpture

David Reekie is an English glass sculptor who uses drawing and glass casting to express his vision of the human condition. His art can be found in the Victoria and Albert Museum in London and the Carnegie Museum of Art in Pittsburgh, as well as in several other public collections in the United Kingdom.

A founding member of British Artists in Glass, now the Contemporary Glass Society, Reekie's work has featured in countless periodicals and in over 60 exhibits worldwide.

== Background and education ==
Born in the London Borough of Hackney (1947), David Reekie discovered an early love of drawing that has remained central to his life and work for well over four decades. Distinguished by his talent with a pencil and an active perceptive faculty he was encouraged to attend art college.

Reekie studied art at Stourbridge College of Art (1967–1970). Set in the heart of the UK's traditional glass making industry, Stourbridge College of Art was a natural place of innovation and discovery in the world of glass art. What is thought to be the only complete remaining glass cone of its kind, reaching 100 ft into the air and enclosing a furnace around which glass has been made for almost two centuries, the Red House Cone, dominates the landscape.

At Stourbridge, Reekie studied under the pioneering glass sculptor Harry Seager whose plate glass stacking pieces, were ahead of his time. He also drew inspiration from Professor Keith Cummings commonly known as the father of English cast glass. A pioneer of cire perdue, or the lost wax casting technique, Professor Cummings is an internationally recognised glass artist and author of a number of books on the subject. Reekie went on to study at Birmingham College of Art Education, eventually obtaining a fellowship in glass at Lincolnshire and Humberside Arts (1975–1980).

In 1976 Reekie was part of a group of glass artists who founded British Artist's in Glass, now the Contemporary Glass Society This organisation was partly instrumental in bringing Reekie's work international recognition.

In 1988, he was awarded a Winston Churchill Travel Fellowship to research glass in architecture in the US. His work is currently shown in America by Thomas R.Riley Galleries, Cleveland, Ohio. Reekie has lectured extensively on glass sculpture and his own casting technique, in the UK Europe, US and Australia.

== Modus operandi ==
An innovator both artistically and technically in the field, Reekie's work more often than not, begins on the page with a sketch or a drawing. These drawings are surreal in character and similar in attitude to the humorist John Tenniel, who worked first for Punch magazine and later collaborated with Lewis Carroll in producing the illustrations for Alice in Wonderland.

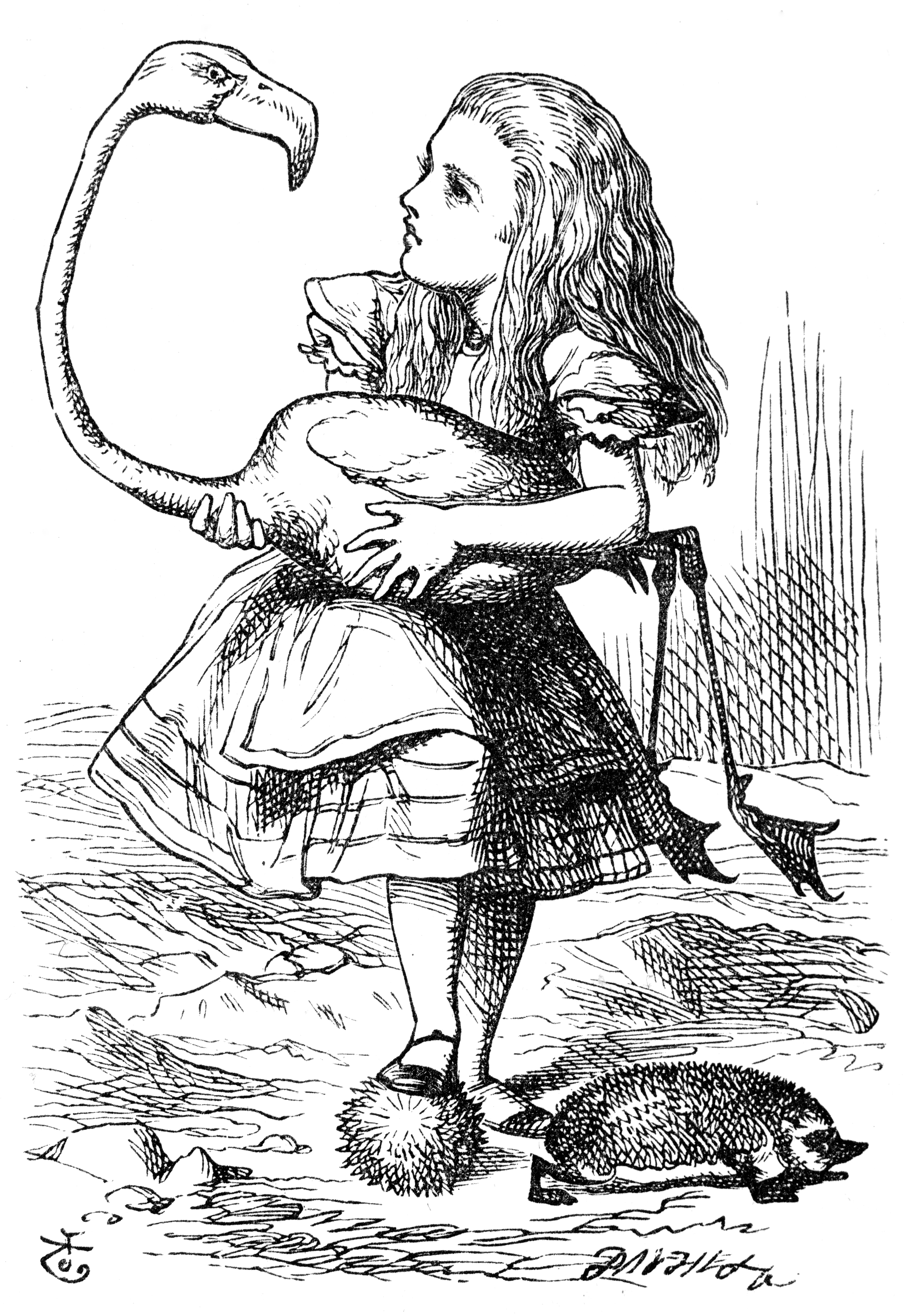
"Managing her flamingo", John Tenniel

Like Tenniel, Reekie is driven not so much by the inner nature or surface beauty of his medium, so much as by his observations of the foibles and failings of human and animal character. As Jennifer Hawkins Opie of the Victoria and Albert Museum puts is:

"Unlike many of his contemporaries, the intrinsic beauty of glass holds little fascination for Reekie; in his work the material must be pressed into the service of narrative and comment. His telling explorations of humankind's obsessions are unique in contemporary British glass and they tread a fine between comedy and tragedy"

This combination of pictorial satirist and skilled craftsman, places Reekie's work in the tradition of the London born painter, engraver and social critic, William Hogarth

The 18th-century Hogarth took a lively interest in London street life and the political questions of the day, which he expressed in his paintings and engravings. A Londoner himself, Reekie states that one of the sources of his inspiration is newspaper photographs. The penny dreadfuls of today perhaps providing a ready source of images and stories, revealing the often absurd nature of our relationships with one another and political life.

== Method ==
An early enthusiast of cast glass, Reekie has developed his own distinct version of the lost wax casting method. The lost wax process can be traced back to the Romans and involves creating a wax model which is then encased in a casting material and steamed out.

The piece is modelled first in wax with the base being moulded out of clay. The modelling is a gradual process that takes about two weeks.

When the artist is satisfied with the model, it is carefully encased in a plaster and flint mould. As soon as the mould is dry, the clay is gently removed and the wax model is steamed out. The mould is now ready to be filled with glass cullet.

Whilst the mould is still damp, Reekie paints the inside surfaces with vitreous enamel which gives the glass the kind of 'painterly quality' that characterises his drawings: a technique perfected over many years. In this way the colour is transferred to the three dimensional glass sculpture. A displacement test, using a bucket of water in the manner of Archimedes, is used to measure the quantity of glass needed. The mould is then filled with cullet and transferred to a kiln.

The kiln firing programme takes about ten days. During the first 24 hours of the firing programme, more glass is added as the cullet melts down. After 48 hours the glass will have melted and there is nothing to do but wait for the firing cycle to run its course. The cooling or annealing process, takes about a week. The mould can then be carefully removed, using wooden tools. When cold. the glass is ground and polished with diamond tools.

== Themes ==
A central theme of Reekie's work is the threat that modern life poses to our individuality and to the natural world. Much of his work is Kafkaesque in its perception of the powerful, anonymous forces that try to shape us; and our ability (or lack of it) to either adapt to them or escape them.

His expression of this is often satirically humorous, see for example the Robot Series in the gallery below. Reekie states that this series was partly inspired by his childhood memories of watching Forbidden Planet and Robby the Robot in the 1950s. Before the appearance of Robby, robots in movies and plays tended to lack personality characteristics, being simple mechanical devices. The artist suggests that his pieces are created to question our own, often robotic or mindless behaviour. Indeed, human stupidity is a recurrent theme of Reekie's work. Perhaps the fact that today we give robots human characteristics, is as much a reflection on our own mechanical and unimaginative responses to the conditions we find ourselves in, as it is to developing technologies. In some sense our adaptability may well be our undoing. The title of the Robot Series, can be understood as a humorous take on Isaac Asimov's Robot series – and the Three Laws of Robotics may well feature. Another work by the artist, expressing the same themes is 'The Engineers'. Reekie's work is occasionally overtly political, in Rising Tension for instance, we are told that the piece "relates to terrorism or the Israeli-Palestinian conflict" and that it shows his own frustration about people's stubbornness and inability to get along. More often than not however, he is concerned with questions that relate to the human condition generally:

"My work is influenced by our reaction and adaptation to the society that surrounds us. We live in a world that grows more complex and difficult to comprehend. It has tensions and temptations that pull us in different directions. This creates characters and situations that provide a constant source of material from which I take my ideas",

In A Captive Audience (a work commissioned by the Victoria and Albert Museum) the text accompanying the piece described it in the following terms:

A band of naked figures stands rooted to the spot, each the clone of his neighbour, each indistinguishable from his neighbour, all hemmed in by a barrier and trapped on a confining platform. Seven of the figures face forward, but the eighth, at the back and unseen by his companions, has turned his head. He looks outside the barrier, perhaps hoping for a world with fewer rules and restrictions."

In a series of sculptures entitled Living in Confined Spaces, Reekie explores his sense of the ever-increasing restrictions we place upon ourselves.

The food we eat, the way we think, our notions of physical and political space are all in some ways becoming more limited. ... At the same time, these pieces also illustrate how humans can rise above their limited and shrinking world and somehow manage to find ways of making their predicament more tolerable'.

== Recent work ==
=== An Exchange of Information ===
Reekie had a solo exhibition entitled, An Exchange of Information.

== Gallery ==
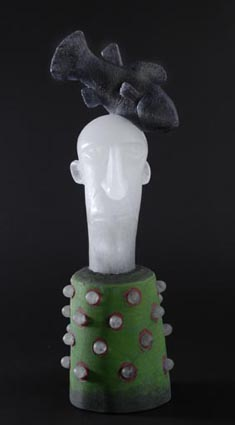
Fruit of the Sea VIII, Feb 2008. This piece is currently on show at the Myths and Legends exhibition, Contemporary Applied Arts, London.

== Exhibitions ==
- 2008 'Myths and Legends', Contemporary Applied Arts, St Percy St, London.
- 2008 Palm Beach3, US Thomas R Riley Galleries. Exchange of Information, Dan Klein Associates Co[]etc. V&A Museum, London
- 2007 Palm Beach3, US Thomas R Riley Galleries. Verriales 2007. Galerie Internationale Du Verre, Biot, France
- 2006 Palm Beach3 Contemporary, US. Thomas R Riley Galleries
- 2005 Talking to Strangers, One man show at Thomas R Riley galleries, Cleveland, Ohio
- 2005 21st Century British Glass, Danial Katz Gallier/ Dan Klein associates, DUAL VISION, The Simona and Jerome Chazen Collection, Museum of Arts & Design, New York, SOFA New York, Thomas R Riley Galleries, The Art of Craft, Medici Gallery, London. Glass Collectors Weekend, Wheaton Village, New Jersey, Verriales 2005. Galerie Internationale du Verre, Biot, France
- 2004 Palm Beach Contemporary, US. Thomas R Riley Galleries. The Human Condition. The Figure in British Art 1950–2002 Birmingham Museum & Art Gallery. British Glass Biennale
- 2003 ArtForm, Palm Beach, US, Thomas R Riley Galleries. The 31st Annual International Glass Invitational, Habatat Galleries, Michigan, US
- 2003 SOFA New York, New York City, Thomas R Riley Galleries
- Verriales 2003. Galerie Internationale Du Verre, Biot, France. Glass Collectors Weekend, Wheaton Village, New Jersey, US, Thomas R Riley Galleries.
- 2003 SOFA Chicago, US, Thomas R Riley Galleries
- 2002 30th Annual International Glass Invitational, Habatat Galleries, Michigan US
- 2002 Palm Springs International Art Fair
- 2001 Cowdy Gallery, 31 Culver St, Newent, Gloucestershire
- 2001 Millennium Glass Commissions, Broadfield Glass Museum, West Midlands
- 2001 29th Annual International Invitational, Habatat Galleries, Michigan, US
- 2001 David Reekie: Sculptor in Glass, Humour, Politics and the Human Condition at the Rotunda Gallery, Norwich Castle, Norwich, Norfolk
- 2001 International Glass, Habatat Galleries, Millennium Museum, Beijing Shanghai Fine Arts Museum
- 2001 SOFA Chicago 2001, Navy Pier, Chicago, US
- 2001 4th Hsin-Chu International Glass Art Festival and Symposium, Hsin-Chu Municipal Glass Museum, Hsin-Chu, Taiwan.1999 SOFA 99, New York City
- 2000 SOFA 2000 New York City
- 1999 Verriales 99, Galerie Internationale Du Verre, Biot, France
- 1999 New Glass Economy, Shanghai Public Library, People's Republic of China
- 1999 SOFA 99, Chicago, US
- 1998 SOFA 98, New York City
- 1998 Jerwood Prize for Glass Exhibition, Crafts Council, London
- 1998 SOFA 98, Chicago, US 1995 English Glass Art, Galerie Rob Van Den Doel, The Hague, Netherlands
- 1997 Hsinchu International Glass, Taiwan. 1990 British Glass, Williamson Museum, Liverpool
- 1996 William Morris Revisited, Questioning the Legacy, Whitworth Art Gallery, Manchester
- 1996 Verriales 96, Galerie Internationale Du Verre, Biot, France
- 1996 Venezia Aperto Vetro, Ducal Palace, Venice
- 1995 SOFA 95, Chicago, US
- 1995 David Reekie, One Man Show, Miller Gallery, New York City
- 1995 Breaking Point, Alden Biesen, Belgium
- 1994 World Glass Now 94, Hokkaido Museum of Modern Art, Sapporo, Japan
- 1994 New Kilnformed Glass: Heller Gallery, Palm Beach, US 1984 Verre Contemporain en Europe, Galerie Paskine de Gignoux, Strasbourg, France
- 1993 The Glass Show, Crafts Council Gallery, London, England
- 1992 David Reekie, Galerie Suzel Berna, Antibes & Paris, France
- 1991 Cast Glass Invitational, Habatat Galleries, Boca Raton, Florida, US
- 1991 David Reekie, Miller Gallery, New York
- 1991 International Glass Show, Marco Museo del Arte Contemporanio, Monterrey, Mexico & Museo Rufino Tamayo, Mexico
- 1991 La Verre, International Exhibition of Glass, Rouen, France
- 1990 18th International Glass Invitational, Habatat Galleries, Michigan, US
- 1989 Form, Construction and Glass, Contact Gallery, Norwich
- 1989 Masterworks of Contemporary Glass, Christies, New York
- 1989 New Art Forms, Chicago International Art Exposition, US
- 1988 International Exhibition of Glass Craft 88, Kanazawa, Japan
- 1988 British Contemporary Glass, Braggiotti Gallery, Rotterdam
- 1987 Stourbridge Glass 1854–1987, Birmingham Museum and Art Gallery
- 1987 Studio Glass Gallery of Great Britain, Montclair, New Jersey, US
- 1985 Studio Glass, British Crafts Centre, London 1987 Glass Art, Museum of Art, São Paulo, Brazil
- 1984 New Glasswork from Britain, Essener Glasgalerie, Essen, Germany
- 1984 Studio Glass since 1945, Royal Pavilion Art Gallery & Museum, Brighton
- 1983 British Glass Artists, Glass Art Gallery, Toronto, Canada
- 1983 David Reekie & Jim Roddis, Het Glashuis, Alkmaar, Netherlands
- 1981 New Glass, Victoria & New Albert Museum, London
- 1979 Glass Now, Portsmouth Museum and Art Gallery
- 1979 British Artists in Glass, Galerie SM, Frankfurt, Germany
- 1978 Six Modern Glassmakers, Dudley Art Gallery
- 1977 Glass Constructions, Usher Gallery, Lincoln
- 1977 British Artists in Glass, British Crafts Centre, London
- 1973 Glass & Ceramics, Dudley Art Gallery
- 1971 New Dimensions 71, Camden Arts Centre, London
- 1970 Manufactured Art, Camden Arts Centre, London

== Work in Museums ==
Manchester City Art Gallery

- Small Cast Heads 1977

Portsmouth Museum & Art Gallery

- Construction No. 3 1978

Broadfield House Glass Museum, Kingswinford, West Midlands

- Construction with Guarding Figures 1978
- Struggling Man 1984,
- A Human Oddity 2001

Usher Art Gallery, Lincoln

- Cast Glass Construction 1980

Pilkington Glass Museum, St Helens

- Strange Offering II 1986
- Man With a Wheel 1990

Glasmuseet Ebeltoft, Denmark

- Strange Offering IV 1987

Norwich Castle Museum, Contemporary Glass Collection

- Spring Return 1988

Liberty Museum, Philadelphia, US

- Which Way? 1990

Carnegie Museum of Art, Pittsburgh, US

- Greek Head III 1993

Victoria & Albert Museum, London Contemporary Glass Collection

- Greek Head V 1994

A Captive Audience 2000

Birmingham City Art Gallery

- Living in Confined Spaces II 1998

Musee-Atelier du Verre de Sars Poteries, France

- Living in Confined Spaces III 1998

Tutsek Foundation, Munich, Germany

- Someone Else's Body II

Shipley Art Gallery & Museum

- Sitting on the Fence II 2003
