= Contemporary Glass Society =

British association of glassmakers

The Contemporary Glass Society (CGS) is an association of artists working in the medium of glass in the United Kingdom and internationally. Established in 1997, the organisation is funded through member subscriptions and charitable contributions. It publishes the Glass Network digital magazine.

It awards an annual graduate review prize and also publishes the New Graduate Review magazine.

== Background ==
Peter Layton, founder of the London Glassblowing workshop, started the Contemporary Glass Society and became its first chairman in 1997. started the organisation together with Colin Reid and Tessa Clegg, the Contemporary Glass Society rose from the ashes of British Artists in Glass, an informal association of individual Glass Artists founded in 1976 by a group of artists including the glass sculptor David Reekie. Essentially an informal craft guild, British Artists in Glass was composed almost entirely of artists working in blown and kiln glass. Since its demise in 1992, the representation of British Glass had been left to individual efforts. There was no overall organisation. Through discussions with other like-minded people, Peter Layton identified the need for a unified National Society to represent the interests of enthusiasts of glass more generally, within the national and international community. The Contemporary Glass Society was the result.

The first conference was held at the University of Wolverhampton with over 100 attendees and a line-up of speakers including Keith Cummings, Diana Hobson, and Alison Kinnard.

== Peter Layton ==
Layton was born in 1937 in Prague. He was originally Lowy but when they moved to England his parents changed their surname to Layton. He and his parents escaped on one of the last trains out of the country in 1939 when the Nazis invaded Czechoslovakia. He first lived in Surrey and then moved to Bradford.

== Present work ==
In 2005, CGS became a non-profit making limited company.

An Arts Council England funded organisation, CGS has a growing membership that now includes not simply glass artists, but makers, collectors, students, trade and education establishments. CGS is run by a voluntary committee made up mostly of makers and its administrator, Pam Reekie. It publishes a quarterly newsletter Glass Network, designed by the artist Roger Kohn and runs its own website and produces material showcasing the work of glass artists throughout the UK. The society organises a number of public activities including; international conferences and one-day symposiums as well as practical workshops covering a range of techniques, such as Glass blowing, hot glass, architectural glass, glass engraving and glass casting and kiln work.

In 2022, society trustee Fiona Fawcett curated an exhibition at the Stourbridge Glass Museum celebrating the 25th anniversary of the Contemporary Glass Society.

== Notable members ==
Current members of the Contemporary Glass Society include: Katharine Coleman, Emma Woffenden, Anna Dickinson, Fiaz Elson, Catherine Hough, David Reekie, Colin Reid, and Tessa Clegg.

== See also ==
- National Glass Centre
