= John Wyatt (writer) =

British writer (1925–2006)

John Wyatt MBE (1925–2006) was a British writer. He was the first Warden, (since renamed Ranger), for the Lake District National Park, and commonly detailed life in the Lake District in his books.

== Life and works ==
Wyatt was born in Ashton-under-Lyne in 1925, the son of a cotton mill overlooker, and spent his early years living in the area. His first experience in the Lakelands was during his years in the 3rd Ashton Scout Group, on a camping trip above Windermere. He later said, "Somehow I felt as if I belonged. It was overwhelming. It was almost as if I had returned home after a long absence.". He left school at the age of 15 and went to work as a copy boy in the Manchester office of The Daily Telegraph. During the Second World War Wyatt served in the Royal Navy as a radio operator. Finally returning to his work after the war, Wyatt decided to move to the countryside and he became a forestry worker and campsite warden at Great Tower, Windermere.

Wyatt became the park ranger in the Lake District national park in 1961, as the park introduced new regulations to cope with increasing tourism in the area. This made him the first ranger for the park, having to patrol practically all of the Lakeland's 866 square miles (2,200 km^{2}) on his own for around two years. Wyatt was set to work monitoring footpaths, checking up on local farmers and points of interest and delivering lectures on the locality. However, later in 1963 the Lakes hired another ranger to help, with Wyatt being assigned to the southern parts of the park. In the 1970s, the park hired more rangers and so, in 1973, he was declared chief ranger, and his work became more and more administrative. He was given an M.B.E at the same time in acknowledgement of his work for the National Park.

After he retired in 1986, he focused on continuing his writings, soon having a number of publications and contributions to TV and radio scripts on or about the Lakes. His works are usually autobiographical, such as Reflections on the Lakes or guidebooks such as Cumbria: The Lake district and its County.

=== List of books ===
Some of his more famous works include:

- The Bliss of Solitude: A Conservationist's Tour of the Lakes, ISBN 1-873551-01-0
- Cumbria: The Lake District and its County, ISBN 0-7090-7440-9
- Lake District National Park (guidebook), ISBN 0-86350-133-8
- National Parks of England And Wales, ISBN 0-86350-155-9
- Reflections on the Lakes ISBN 0-902363-83-2
- The Shining Levels: The Story of a Man Who Went Back to Nature, ISBN 0-09-921861-5
- Ever Want
