= Ireland Park =

Memorial park in Toronto, Canada

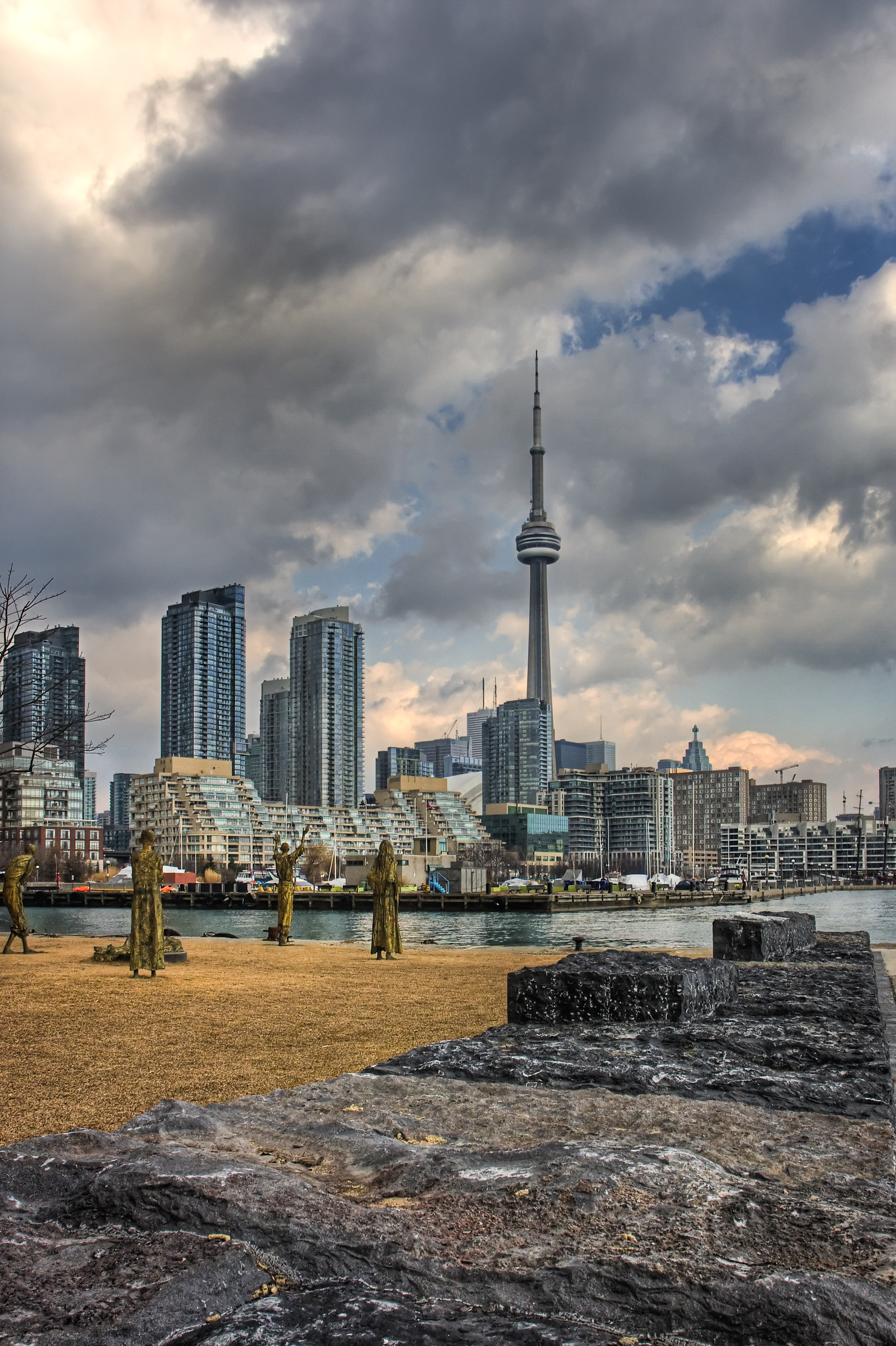
- Toronto skyline seen from the park

- Location within Toronto
- Type: Public park
- Location: Toronto, Ontario, Canada
- Coordinates: 43°38′04.5″N 79°23′45″W
- Created: June 21, 2007
- Operator: Toronto Parks

Ireland Park is located on the shores of Lake Ontario on Éireann Quay, adjoining the Canada Malting Silos, at the foot of Bathurst Street in Toronto, Ontario, Canada. Officially opened in the summer of 2007, Ireland Park commemorates the estimated 38,000 Irish who left Ireland during the Great Famine and the over 1,100 new immigrants who died during the Typhus epidemic of 1847.

The park was designed by Irish- Canadian architect Jonathan Kearns. He designed it to be an emotional and evocative place calling up long-lost memories of destitute ancestors who arrived in Canada from Ireland with hopes for a new life in a new land. The park features oak trees, a cylinder of stacked glass that symbolises as a beacon of hope, and five bronze sculptures created by Irish sculptor Rowan Gillespie. The sculptures mirror a similar Famine Memorial in Dublin at the Custom House Quays. The figures in Dublin represent The Departure, with Toronto's sculptures representing The Arrival. The Hamilton Spectator described the work as follows:

"The early immigrants are now honoured at the Toronto waterfront park by five haunting bronze statues created by Irish sculptor Rowan Gillespie...One figure depicts a man lying on the ground, emaciated; another shows a pregnant woman clutching her bulging stomach, while behind her a meek child stands wide-eyed. One frail figure is bent over with hands clasped in prayer, contrasted by a man whose arms are extended to the sky in salvation."

The park has a limestone wall imported from Kilkenny with the names of those who died in the 1847 typhus epidemic including Bishop Michael Power.

The park was officially opened during a ceremony on June 21, 2007, which featured the President of Ireland, Mary McAleese, Ontario Premier Dalton McGuinty, Federal Finance Minister Jim Flaherty, Toronto Mayor David Miller, and the Chairman of the Ireland Park Foundation, Robert Kearns. Mary McAleese described the park as "a memorial that links Ireland and Canada in a very, very powerful way, and brings that story right into the 21st century."

The area surrounding the park has seen the creation of a pedestrian promenade along the waterfront and the restoration of the adjacent Canadian Malting Silos.

In 2009, a film entitled Death or Canada featured Ireland Park and the typhus epidemic of 1847 and how it impacted the city of Toronto. The Chairman of Ireland Park, Robert Kearns, is a featured contributor.

== Works ==
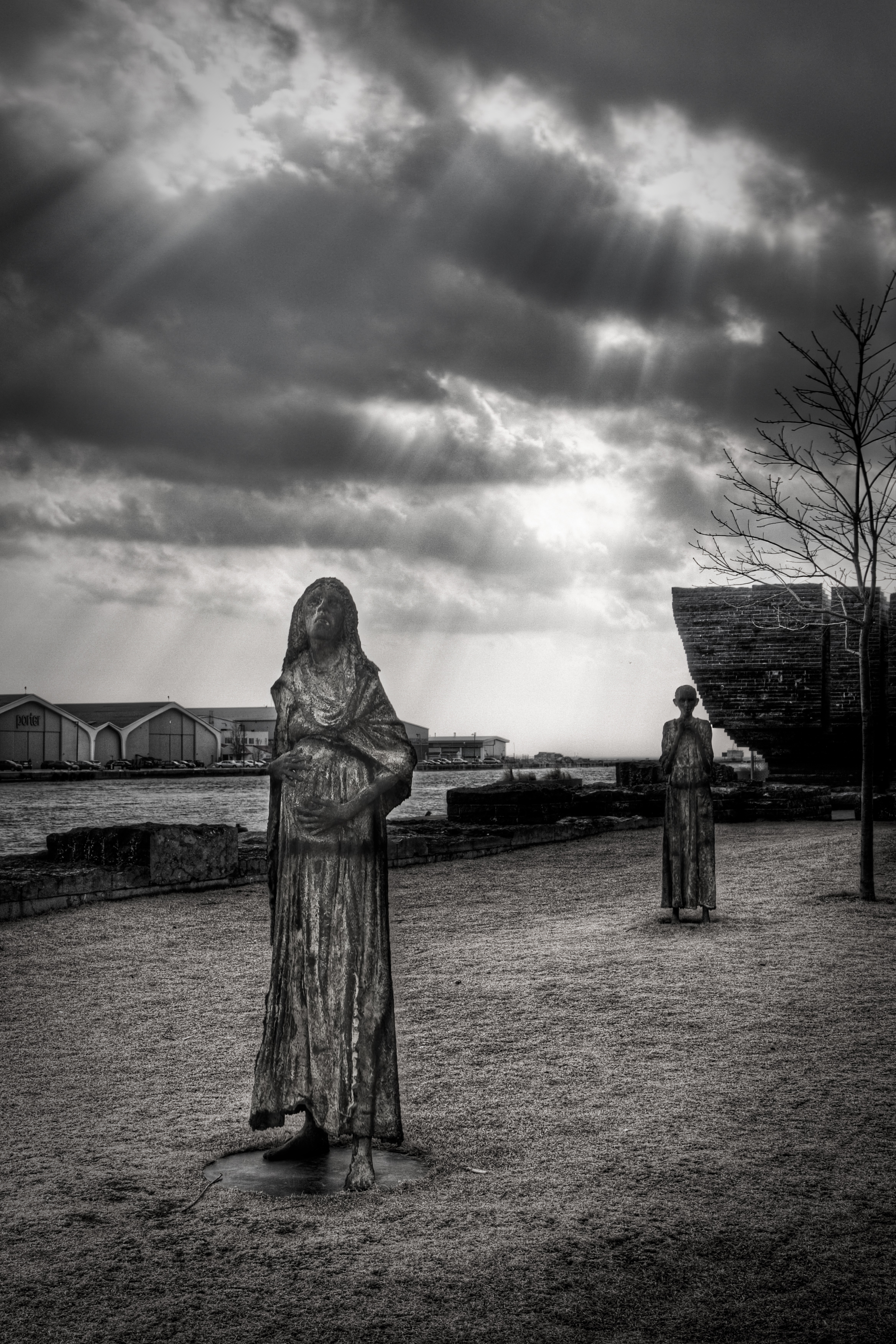
Pregnant Woman

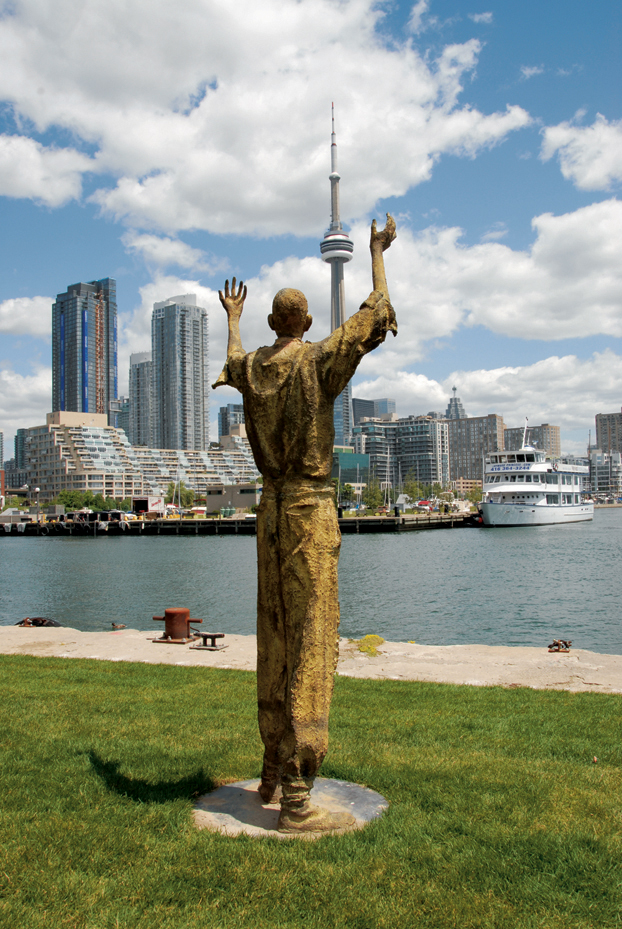
Jubilant Man

Highlights of the Arrival sculptures by Rowan Gillespie in Ireland Park

== See also ==
- Irish Commemorative Stone, Montreal
