= List of memorials to the Great Famine =

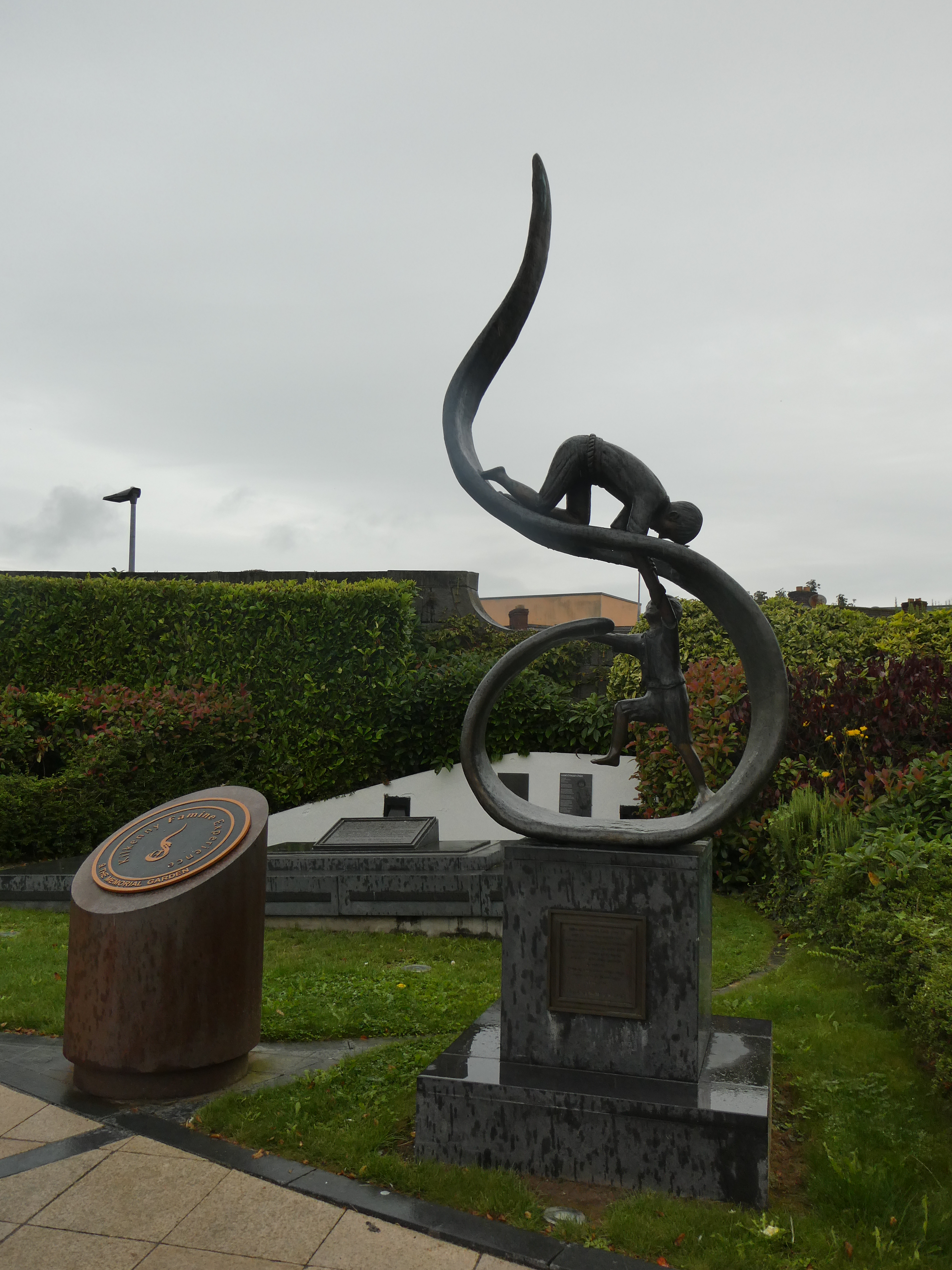
Memorial in Kilkenny over a mass grave associated with the nearby Kilkenny Union Workhouse.

The Great Famine of Ireland is memorialized in many locations throughout Ireland, especially in those regions that suffered the greatest losses, and also in cities overseas with large populations descended from Irish immigrants. To date more than 100 memorials to the Irish Famine have been constructed worldwide.

== Republic of Ireland ==
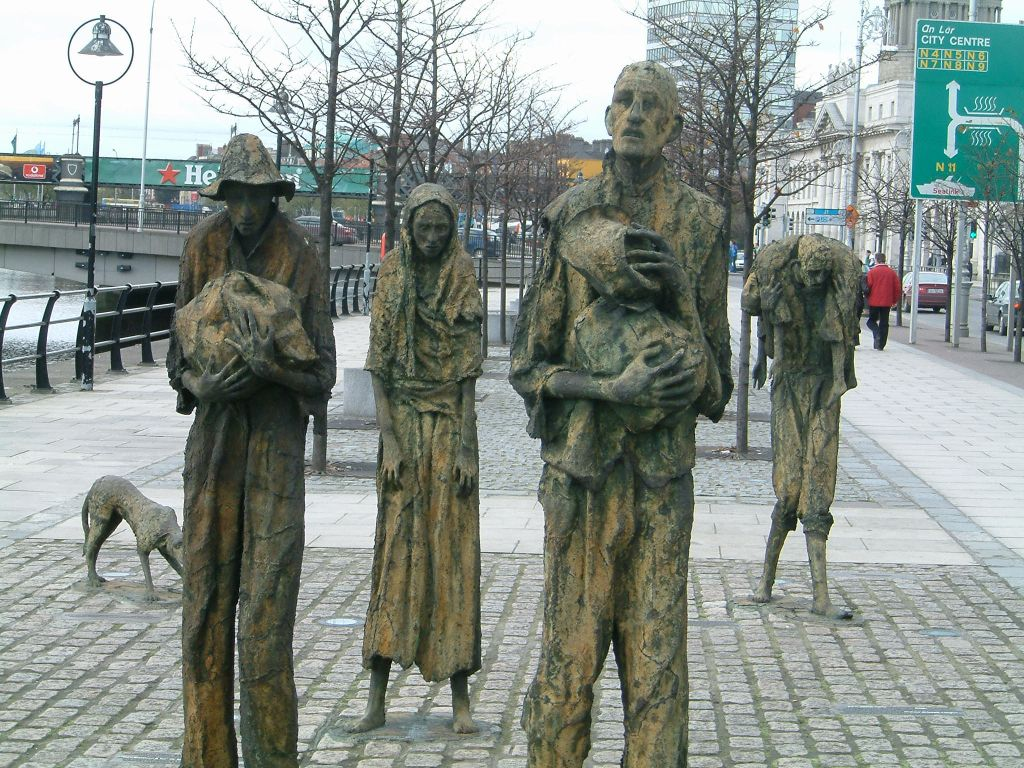
Famine Memorial on Customs House Quays, Dublin by Rowan Gillespie

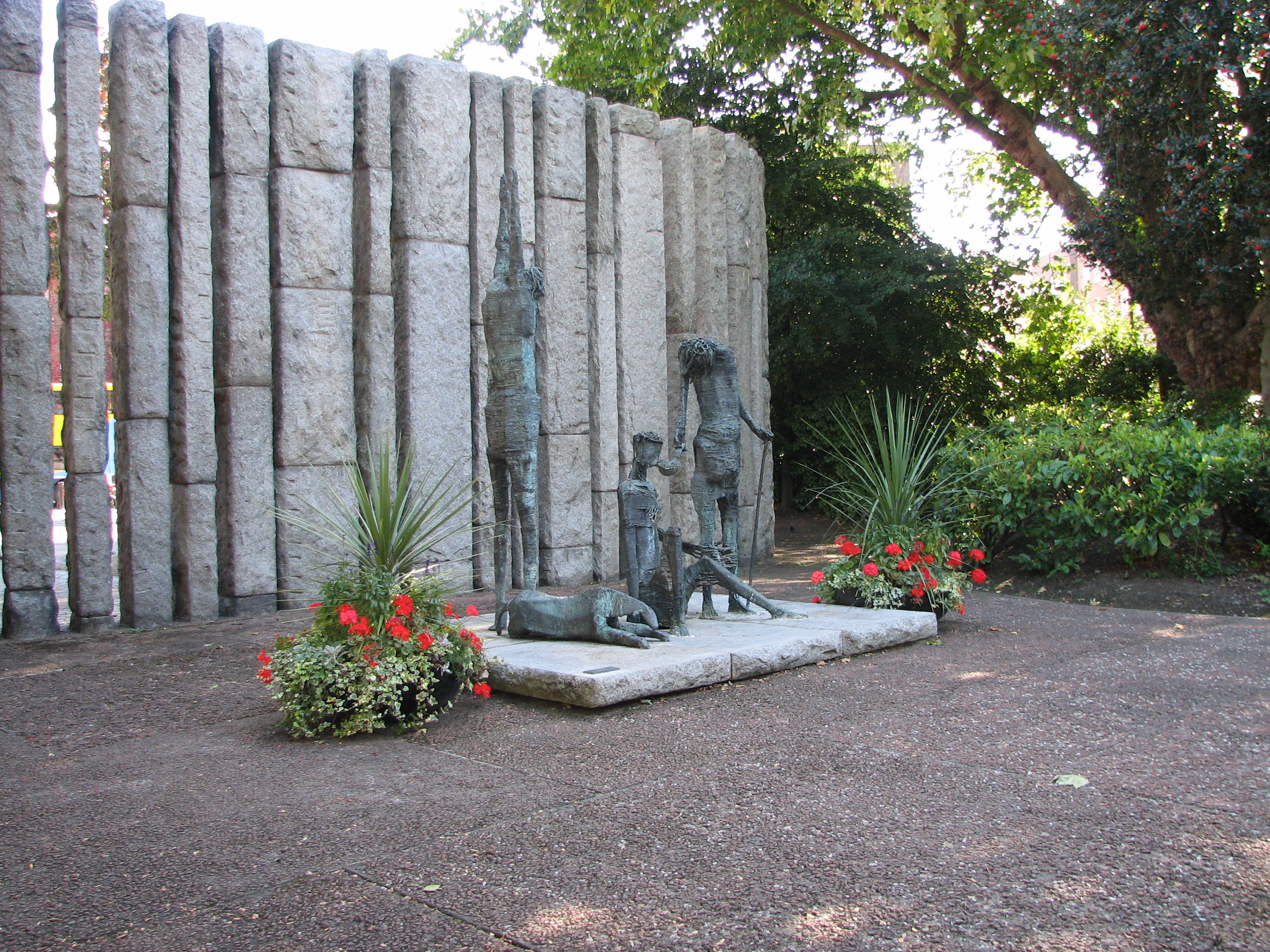
"Famine" by Edward Delaney, St. Stephen's Green, Dublin

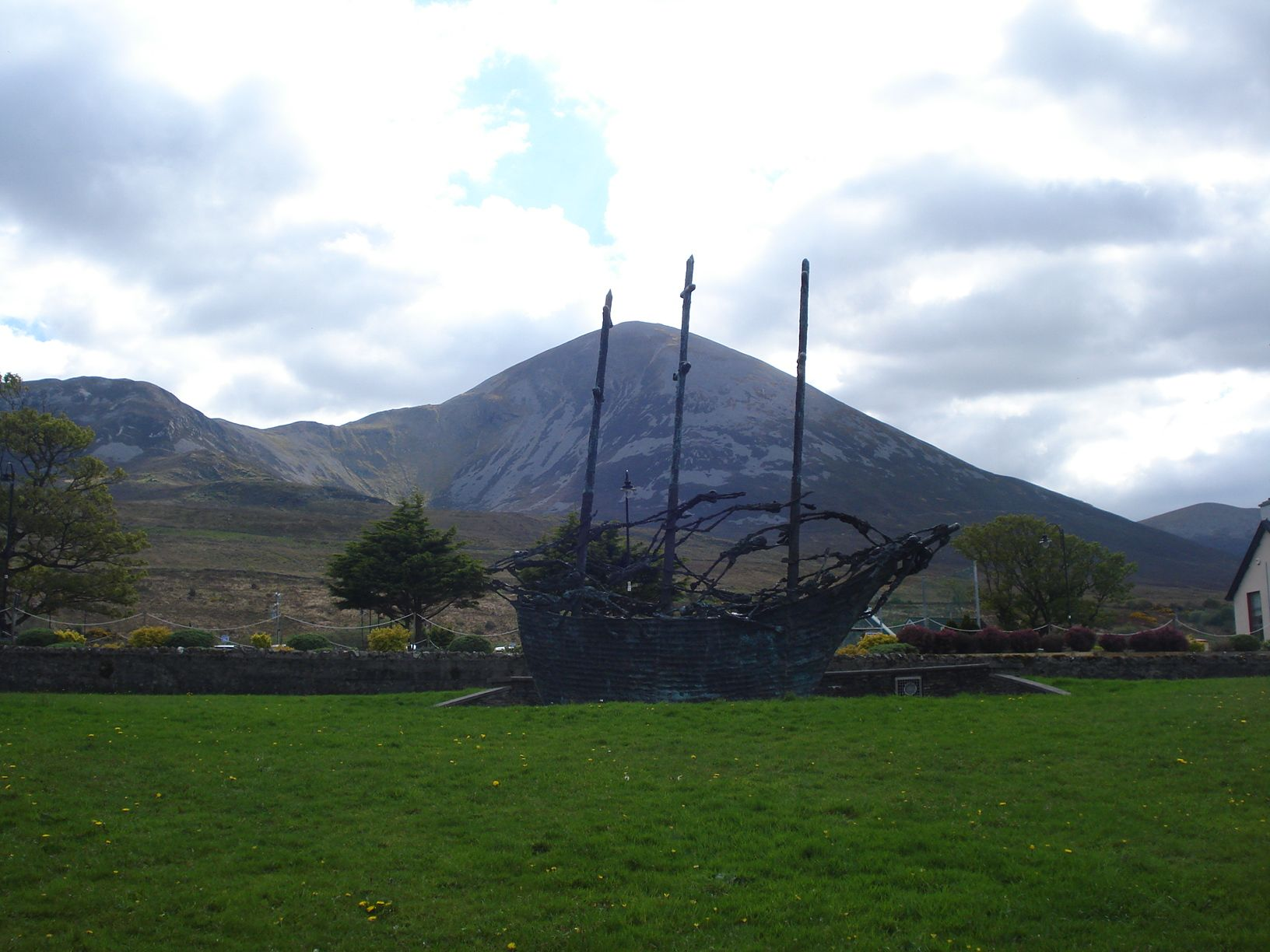
National Famine Memorial at Murrisk, County Mayo.

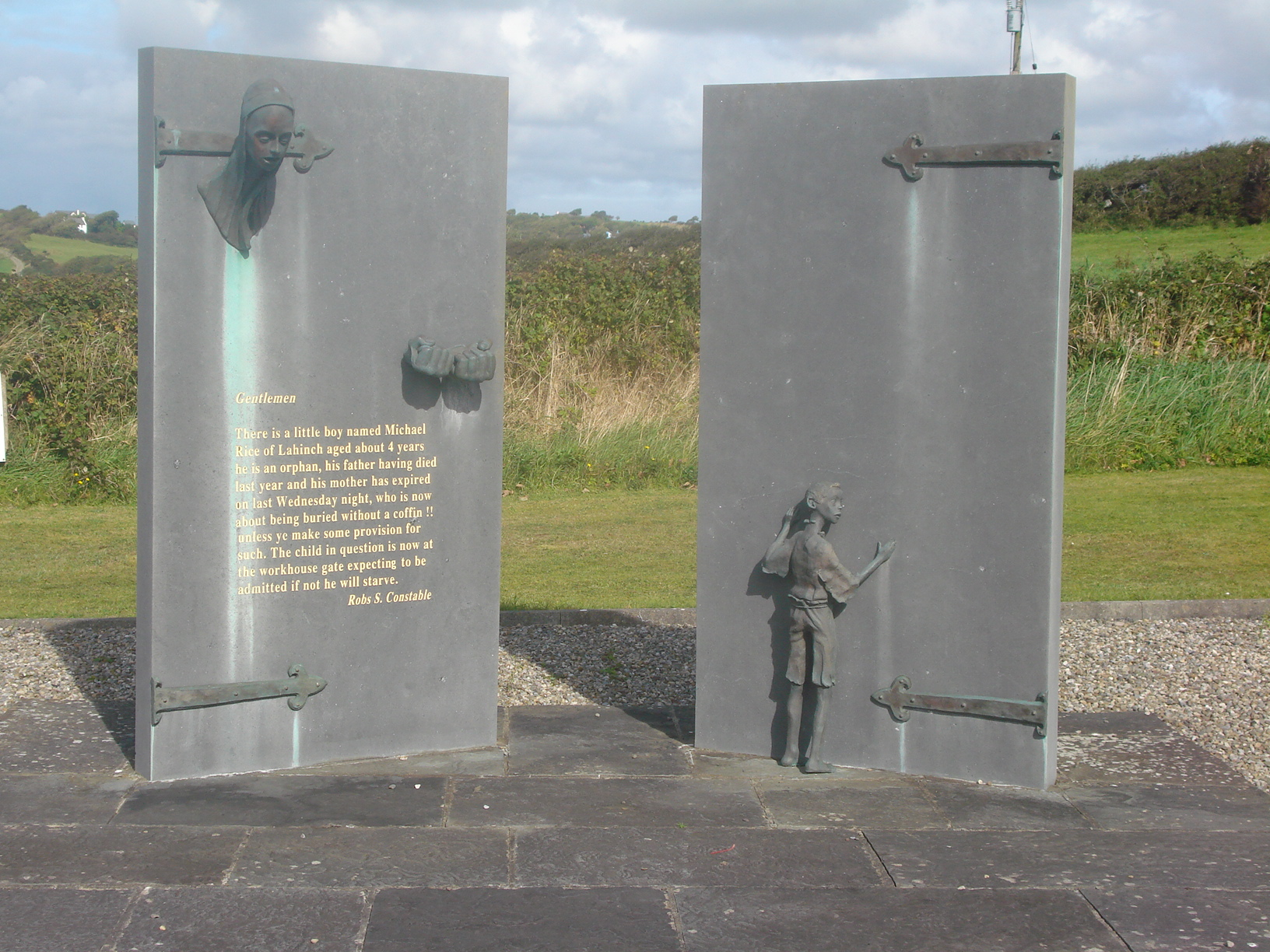
Famine Monument near the former workhouse at Ennistymon, County Clare

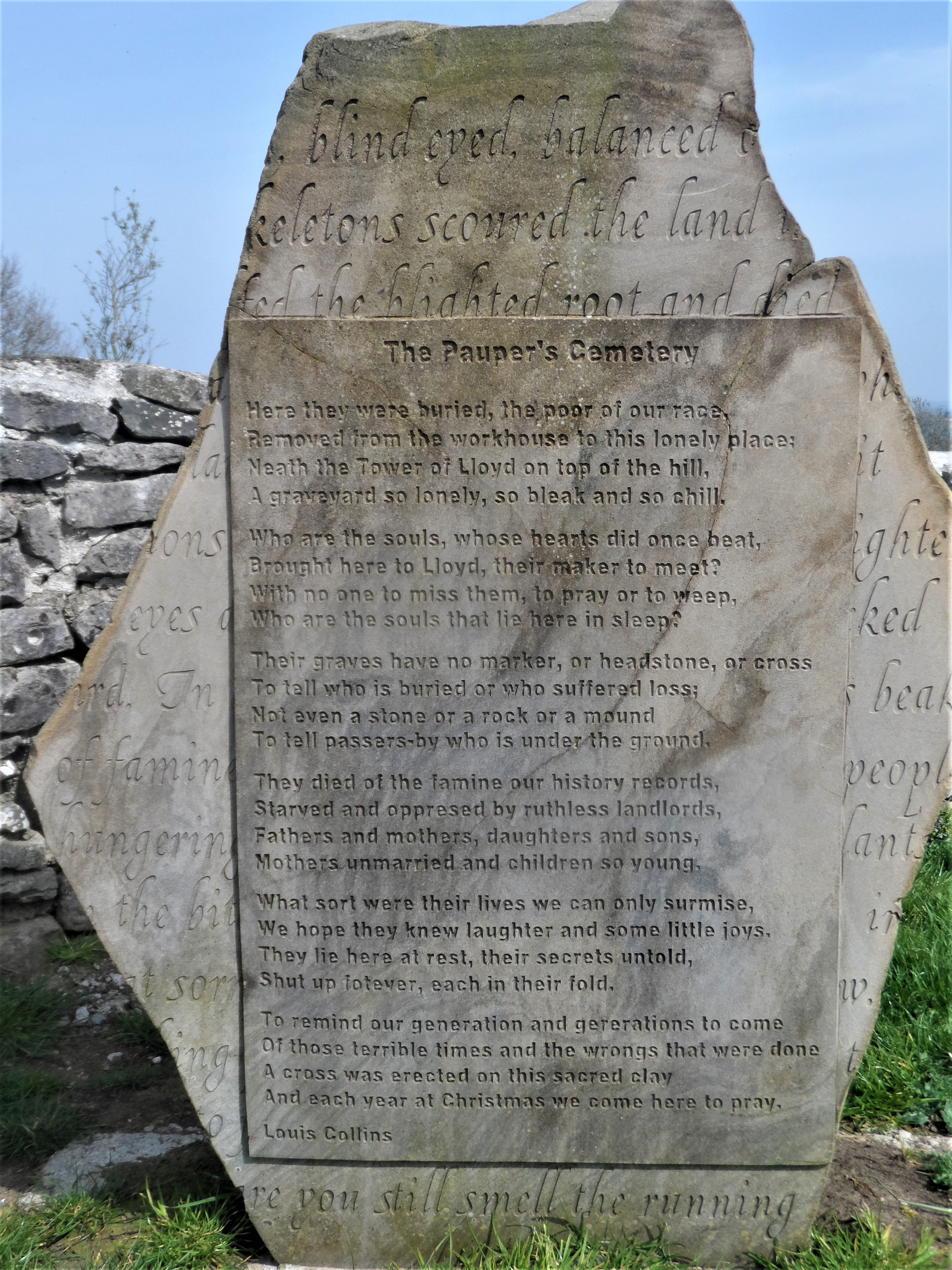
Memorial with poem in Kells, County Meath

- County Clare
  - Ennistymon: This was the first memorial in Ireland to honour those who suffered and were lost during the Great Famine. It is erected across the road from Ennistymon Hospital, built on the grounds of the local workhouse where an estimated 20,000 Irish died and a mass graveyard for children who perished and were buried without coffins.
  - Tuamgraney famine graveyard memorial at St. Cronan's Church, Tuamgraney
- County Cork
  - Midleton: the Kindred Spirits sculpture
- County Donegal
  - Doagh Island, Inishowen: Doagh Visitor Centre and Famine Museum has exhibits and memorial on the effects of the famine in Inishowen, Donegal.
- County Dublin
  - Customs House Quays: Famine Memorial (Dublin) Painfully thin sculptural figures, by artist Rowan Gillespie, stand as if walking towards the emigration ships on the Dublin Quayside.
  - St Stephen's Green, Dublin. "Famine", a sculpture by Edward Delaney.
- County Galway
  - Ballinasloe: Famine Remembrance Park, Cleaghmore, Ballinasloe
  - Galway: Galway Famine Ship Memorial, Celia Griffin Memorial Park, Salthill, Galway.
- County Kilkenny
  - Kilkenny in the McDonagh Junction complex. The memorial is marked by a small garden, where many bodies were found during an excavation of the Kilkenny Union Workhouse.
- County Laois
  - Donaghmore: Famine Museum - set in Donaghmore Workhouse.
  - Timahoe: Famine Memorial - Dedicated in 2020. It is adjacent to the Timahoe Round Tower at the Timahoe Cultural Center. Originally a bowl used by a woolen mill to colour cloth, then it was used as a soup bowl, then a cattle drinking trough, and now a symbol to the famine. Some landlords actually helped and would make pots of soup for those that were hungry. It was a gruel soup made from Indian meal, believed to be donated by American Indian Tribes.

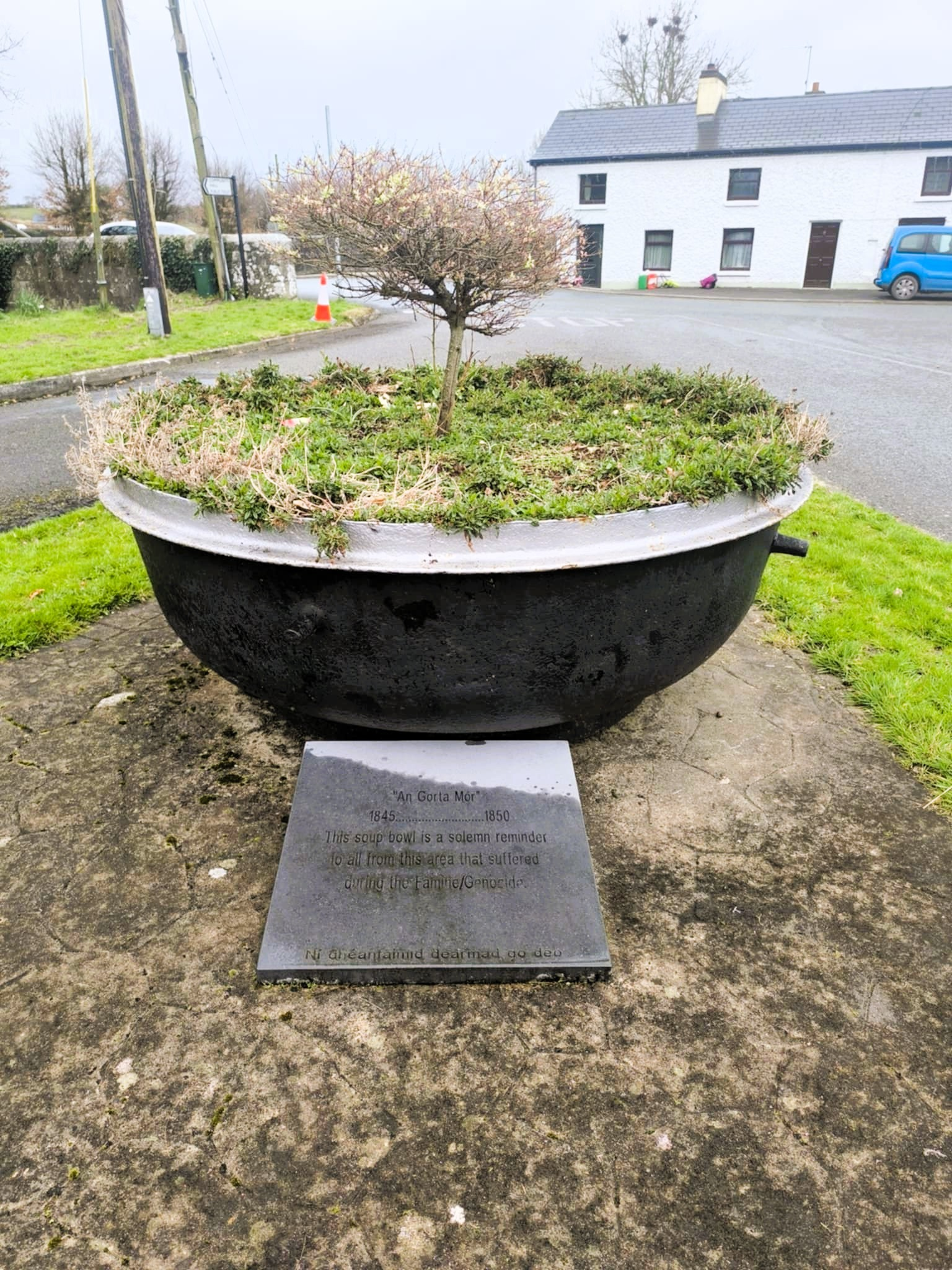
Famine Memorial at Timahoe

- County Limerick
  - Kilmallock: A Famine Memorial Park marks the graves of those who died in the nearby workhouse and were buried in unmarked graves.
  - Limerick city: The 'Broken Heart' Famine memorial by Maria Pizzuti, Lower Mallow Street. The sculpture, created in 1997, is a fountain in the shape of a broken heart in memory of the forced emigration of several thousands who fled to America and beyond from nearby Steamboat Quay. Also in Limerick city, the Pauper's Graveyard (now known as St Brigid's cemetery) in Killeely. Here a large timber cross was erected on the site of this mass graveyard. There are no headstones.
  - Newcastle West: The Famine Graveyard is at the rear of modern-day St. Ita's Hospital. Hundreds of people who died during the famine are buried there in unmarked graves. The cemetery is marked by a plain old cross. Close by stands the Workhouse.
- County Mayo
  - Doo Lough: A memorial commemorates famine victims of the Doolough Tragedy who walked from Louisburgh along the mountain road to Delphi Lodge to seek relief from the Poor Board who were meeting there. Returning after their request was refused, many of them died at this point.
  - Murrisk: National Famine Memorial. This sculpture of a famine ship, by sculptor John Behan near the foot of Croagh Patrick, depicts the refugees as dead souls, or skeleton bodies in the rigging.
- County Meath
  - Kells, County Meath: paupers' graveyard memorial by the Spire of Lloyd.
- County Monaghan
  - Clones: Famine Graveyard. Clones hosted the National Famine Commemoration for 2011 with President Mary McAleese and other representatives from 30 Countries also taking part.
- County Roscommon
  - National Famine Museum at Strokestown Park
- County Sligo
  - Sligo: three memorial sculptures erected by the Sligo Famine Commemoration Committee. One is at the quayside, of a family comforting each other, where 30,000 people emigrated between 1847 and 1851. The other two are the gates of a famine graveyard and of a tree (called Faoin Sceach) in the grounds of the graveyard, where approximately 2,000 famine victims are buried.
- County Tipperary
  - Ballingarry: Famine Warhouse 1848. Widow McCormack's house, the site of the 1848 rebellion, has now been converted into a museum.
  - Thurles: Famine Museum occupies St. Mary's church in Thurles. St. Mary's church is built on the site of another pre-reformation church dating to the 12th century. This site includes both war and Irish Famine memorials.
- County Westmeath
  - Mullingar: the Famine Memorial Fountain stands on Oliver Plunkett Street in the town.
- County Wicklow
  - Ballyhogue Famine Wall, Ballyhogue, Bree

== United Kingdom ==
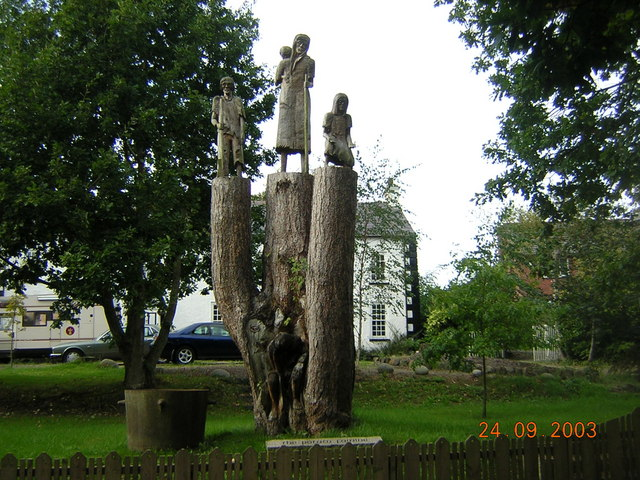
Sculpture at Tannaghmore Gardens, Craigavon

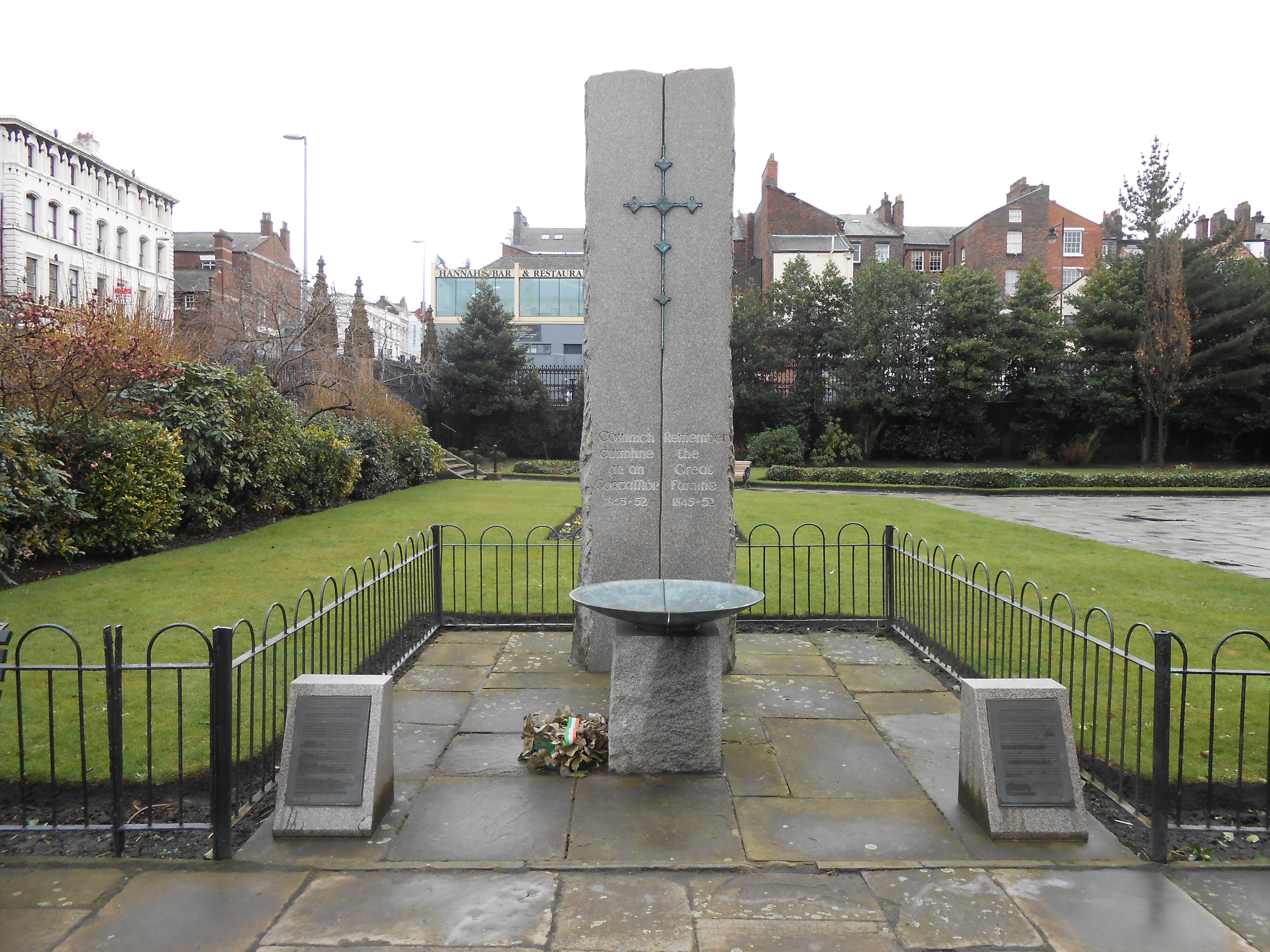
The memorial in St Luke's Church, Liverpool.

- Cardiff, Wales. A Celtic Cross made of Irish limestone on a base of Welsh stone stands in the city's Cathays Cemetery. The cross was unveiled in 1999 as the high point in the work of the Wales Famine Forum, marking the 150th anniversary of the famine. The memorial is dedicated to every person of Irish origin, without distinction on grounds of class, politics, allegiance or religious belief, who has died in Wales.
- Carfin, Motherwell, North Lanarkshire, Scotland. A Celtic Cross memorial unveiled by then Taoiseach Bertie Ahern in the early 21st century.
- Craigavon, Northern Ireland. A tree sculpture at Tannaghmore Gardens commemorates the famine.
- Glasgow, Scotland. A memorial to the Irish and Highland famines was unveiled in Glasgow in 2018. The memorial is located beside the People's Palace at Glasgow Green. In 2009, 2010, and on 11 May 2014 to mark the National Famine Commemoration Day, Celtic FC wore a commemorative emblem on their strips, which consists of a Celtic cross and a four leaf clover motif. This reflects that Celtic themselves were founded by, and in order to support, the Irish immigrant community in the east end of Glasgow, many of whom had fled Ireland for Glasgow following the famine.
- Liverpool, England. A memorial is in the grounds of St Luke's Church on Leece Street, itself a memorial to the victims of the Blitz. It recalls that from 1849 to 1852 1,241,410 Irish immigrants arrived in Liverpool, and from there they dispersed to locations around the world. Many died despite the help they received within the city: some 7000 in the city perished within one year. The memorial was funded by public subscription, with many small donations from local communities, contributions from the British and Irish governments, each of the Merseyside local councils, Dublin and Dun Laoghaire councils and many others. The sculpture was created by Eamonn O'Docherty. The Liverpool Great Hunger Commemoration Committee also erected ten plaques around the city, including one on the gates to Clarence Dock. Unveiled in 2000, the plaque inscription reads in Irish and English: "Through these gates passed most of the 1,300,000 Irish migrants who fled from the Great Famine and 'took the ship' to Liverpool in the years 1845–52" The Maritime Museum, Albert Dock, Liverpool has an exhibition regarding the Irish Migration, showing models of ships, documentation and other facts on Liverpool's history.

== United States ==
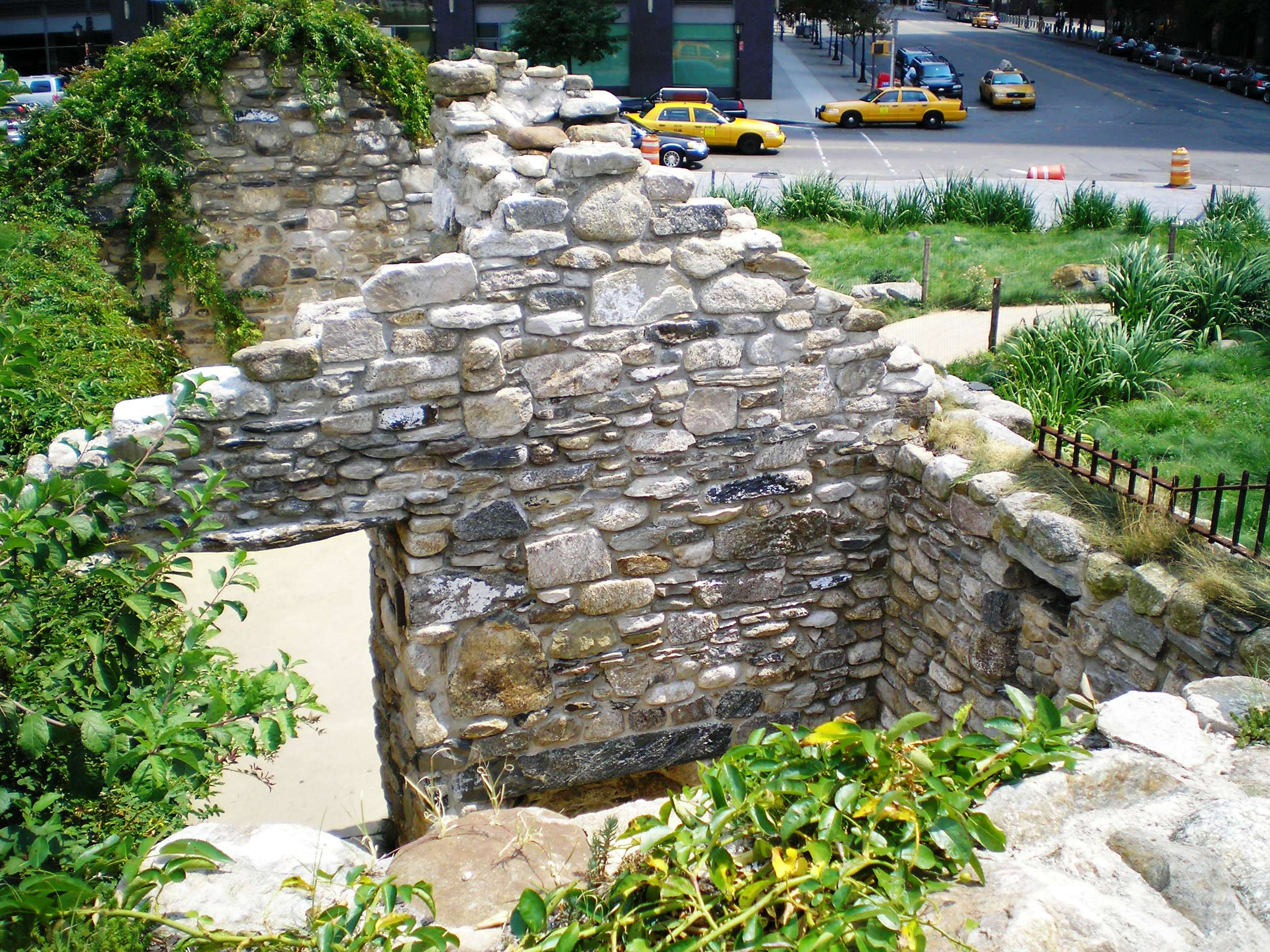
Irish Hunger Memorial, New York City

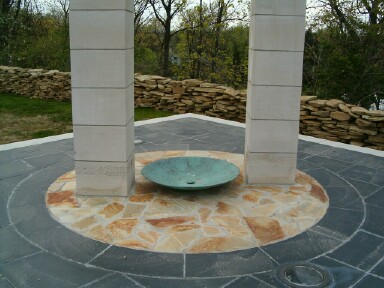
Irish Hills Michigan "An Gorta Mór" (base)

- Ardsley, New York: the V. E. Macy Great Hunger Memorial in Ardsley contains a sculpture by Eamonn O'Doherty as a memorial to the suffering of the Irish during the famine.
- Boston, Massachusetts: the Boston Irish Famine Memorial features a bronze statue located at the corner of Washington and School streets on the Freedom Trail. It depicts a starving woman, looking up to the heavens as if to ask "Why?", while her children cling to her. A second sculpture shows the figures hopeful as they land in Boston.
- Buffalo, New York: a stone memorial on its waterfront.
- Cambridge, Massachusetts: the Irish Famine Memorial is located at Cambridge Common
- Chicago, Illinois: there is a Famine Memorial at Chicago Gaelic Park.
- Cleveland, Ohio: A 12-foot-high (3.7 m) stone Celtic cross, located in Heritage Park on the east bank of the Cuyahoga River.
- Deer Island, Massachusetts: Great Hunger Memorial consisting of a 16 foot tall Irish cross.
- Fairfield, Connecticut: a memorial to the Famine victims stands in the chapel of Fairfield University.
- Hackensack, New Jersey: there is a large stone monument located on the front corner of the Bergen County Government Court House on Main Street, honoring all of those who perished in the famine. Every year in October, numerous Irish-American organizations from northern New Jersey hold a ceremony to remember all of those who perished.
- Hamden, Connecticut: there is a collection of art and literature from the Great Famine is on display in the Lender Family Special Collection Room of the Arnold Bernhard Library at Quinnipiac University.
- Irish Hills, Michigan: An Gorta Mor Memorial is located on the grounds of St. Joseph's Shrine in the Irish Hills district of Lenawee County, Michigan. There are thirty-two black stones as the platform, one for each county. The grounds are surrounded with a stone wall. The Lintel is a step from Penrose Quay in Cork Harbour. The project was the result of several years of fundraising by The Ancient Order of Hibernian's in Lenawee County. It was dedicated in 2004 by AOH St. Patrick's Division.
- Keansburg, NJ: there is a Hunger Memorial in Friendship Park on Main Street.
- New Orleans, Louisiana: has a plaque to the memory of the Great Famine on the monument for the New Basin Canal.
- New York, New York: the Irish Hunger Memorial is located in Battery Park City, a short walk west from the World Trade Center site. It looks like a sloping hillside with low stone walls and a roofless cabin on one side and a polished wall with lit (or white) lines on the other three sides. See .
- Philadelphia, Pennsylvania: The National Memorial to An Gorta Mór is located on a 1.75-acre (7,100 m^{2}) site at Front and Chestnut Streets, near Penn's Landing, and close to the site of Washington Avenue Immigration Station, where many Irish disembarked into America. The large bronze sculpture, by artist Glenna Goodacre features numerous figures arranged in clusters or vignettes, with the east end depicting the misery of the starvation in Ireland. The monument was dedicated on October 25, 2003.
- Phoenix, Arizona: there is a memorial in the form of a dolmen at the Irish Cultural Center.
- Portland, Oregon: the Oregon Irish Famine Memorial is a large Celtic cross carved in Donegal, Ireland, by Donegal born sculptor Brendan Mc Gloin. This 14 ft tall sandstone cross was hand carved in three sections over a two and a half year period. It followed the same passage as emigrants would have road, boat, then rail, and finally road. It is a complete copy of the Cross of the scriptures Clonmacnoise Ireland a 6th-9th Century cross. Some say a sister cross, it is so true to the original. It is positioned on a prominent hill in the city in 2008, with Irish President Mary McAleese present at the unveiling.
- Providence, Rhode Island: an Irish Famine Memorial is situated along the Riverway, dedicated on November 17, 2007. Sculpture and a commemorative wall are the key elements of an impressive memorial that has educated and beautified the Providence River Walk location. A bronze statue of three Irish figures anchors one end of the site, with a walkway incorporating memorial bricks and flagstones leading to the memorial wall. There, a narrative plaque tells the story of the Great Famine and subsequent Irish emigration to the United States in bas relief. Memorial bricks and flagstones border an outline map depicting the two countries, Ireland and America. Twelve memorial benches along the walkway offer points at which to reflect on the stories and memories described in the relief wall and expressed within the numerous inscriptions.
- Rochester, New York: a black granite memorial on the grounds of St. John Fisher College erected in 1997, one hundred and fifty years after the worst of the hunger by the Ancient Order of Hibernians. There is a moving inscription on each side of the memorial and the family names that surround it at the base represent donors who participated in the project. The memorial is the site of remembrances held in concert with the international remembrance day often held in May of each year.
- Staten Island, New York
  - 26 Central Avenue. Marine Hospital—Quarantine Station Cemetery. This cemetery operated from 1847 to 1852 during the peaks years of Irish Famine immigration. All ships entering into NY Harbor were subjected to health inspection; tens of thousand of Irish were held at this facility, thousands perished and were buried at this cemetery. On the third Sunday of May, the Friends of Abandoned Cemeteries, Inc. holds a public memorial and site history. Currently, cemetery signage and Irish Hunger Marker designate the cemetery.
  - 915 Victory Blvd. Marine Hospital—Quarantine Cemetery. This cemetery operated from 1799 to 1858. All ships entering into NY Harbor were subjected to health inspection. This site is a public golf course which operates over the cemetery. Irish Hunger Marker and memorial designates the site as a final resting place of many Irish immigrants.
  - 1562 Richmond Terrace—Staten Island Cemetery. This facility is run by the Friends of Abandoned Cemeteries and is for the burial of children under two years of age from the temporary Irish town which developed as a result of families awaiting outcome of their loved ones held in quarantine. Irish Hunger Marker and statues donated by the Sisters of Charity designate the site.

== Canada ==
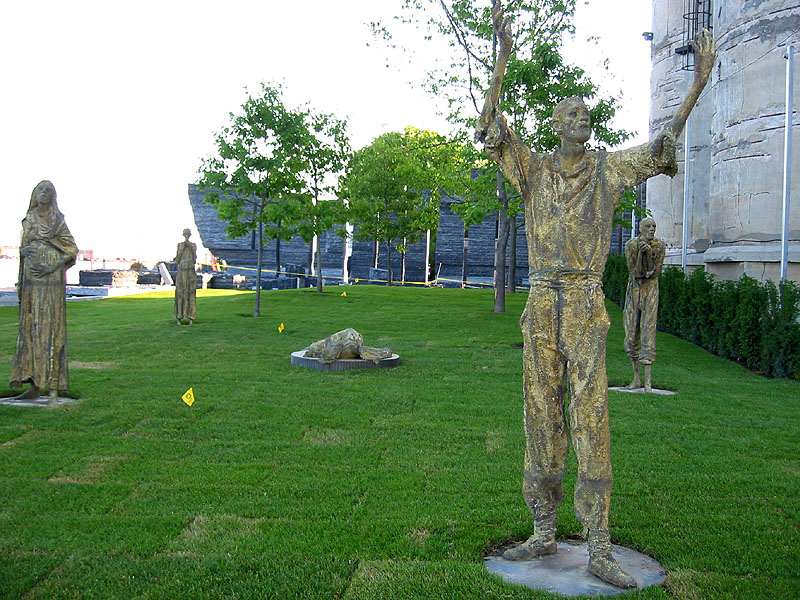
Rowan Gillespie's Great Famine memorial in Ireland Park, Toronto Harbourfront

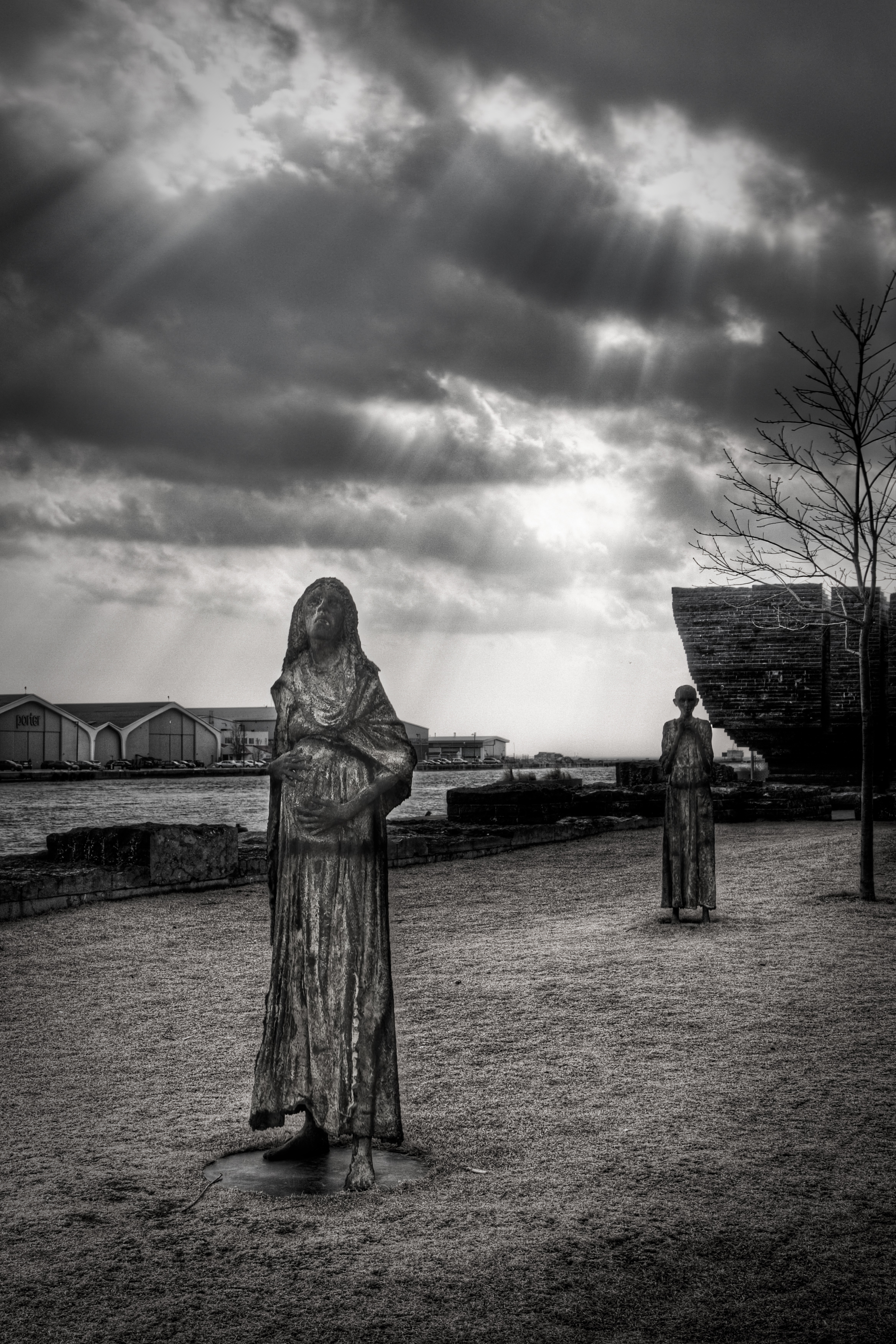
Ireland Park on Éireann Quay, Toronto

- Grosse-Île, Quebec, the largest famine grave site outside Ireland. A large Celtic cross, erected by the Ancient Order of Hibernians, stands in remembrance overlooking the St. Lawrence River. The island is a Canadian national historic site.
- Quebec City, Quebec, 12-foot (3.7 m) limestone cross donated by the government of Ireland in 1997
- Saint John, New Brunswick, a large Celtic cross was built on Partridge Island, which was major quarantine station during the famine.
- Saint Andrews, New Brunswick, a Celtic cross was erected on the mainland in view of Hospital Island. The island was a quarantine station.
- Kingston, Ontario has three monuments:
  - Celtic cross at An Gorta Mor Park on the waterfront.
  - Another is located at Skeleton (McBurney) Park (formerly Kingston Upper Cemetery).
  - Angel of Resurrection monument, first dedicated in 1894 at St. Mary's cemetery.
- Maidstone, Ontario, Ontario has a nine-foot stone Celtic Cross at the cemetery outside St. Mary's Church
- Montreal, Quebec, the "Black Rock", the "Stone" or the Irish Commemorative Stone in Pointe-Saint-Charles, Montreal. It was the first monument to those who had died in the Great Famine. Erected in 1859 by the workers, mostly of Irish origin, on the construction site of the Victoria Bridge when they came across mass graves of those who died of typhus or ship fever. The engraving reads: "To Preserve from Desecration the Remains of 6000 Immigrants Who died of Ship Fever A.D. 1847-48. This Stone is erected by the Workmen of Messrs. Peto, Brassey and Betts Employed in the Construction of the Victoria Bridge A.D. 1859." Since it was erected the Montreal Irish community have organized a Walk to the Stone each year to remember the dead. There is now an effort of the Montreal Irish community to make the location of the Stone into a larger park and recreation area for the use by all of the community.
- Toronto, Ontario:
  - Four bronze statues arriving at the Toronto wharves, at Ireland Park on Bathurst Quay, modeled after the Dublin Departure Memorial.
  - List of names of those who died of typhus in the Toronto fever sheds shortly after their arrival.
  - Current memorial plaque at Metro Hall.
  - Also a pietà statue outside St. Paul's Catholic Basilica in memory of the famine victims and Bishop Michael Power, who died tending to the sick.

== Australia ==
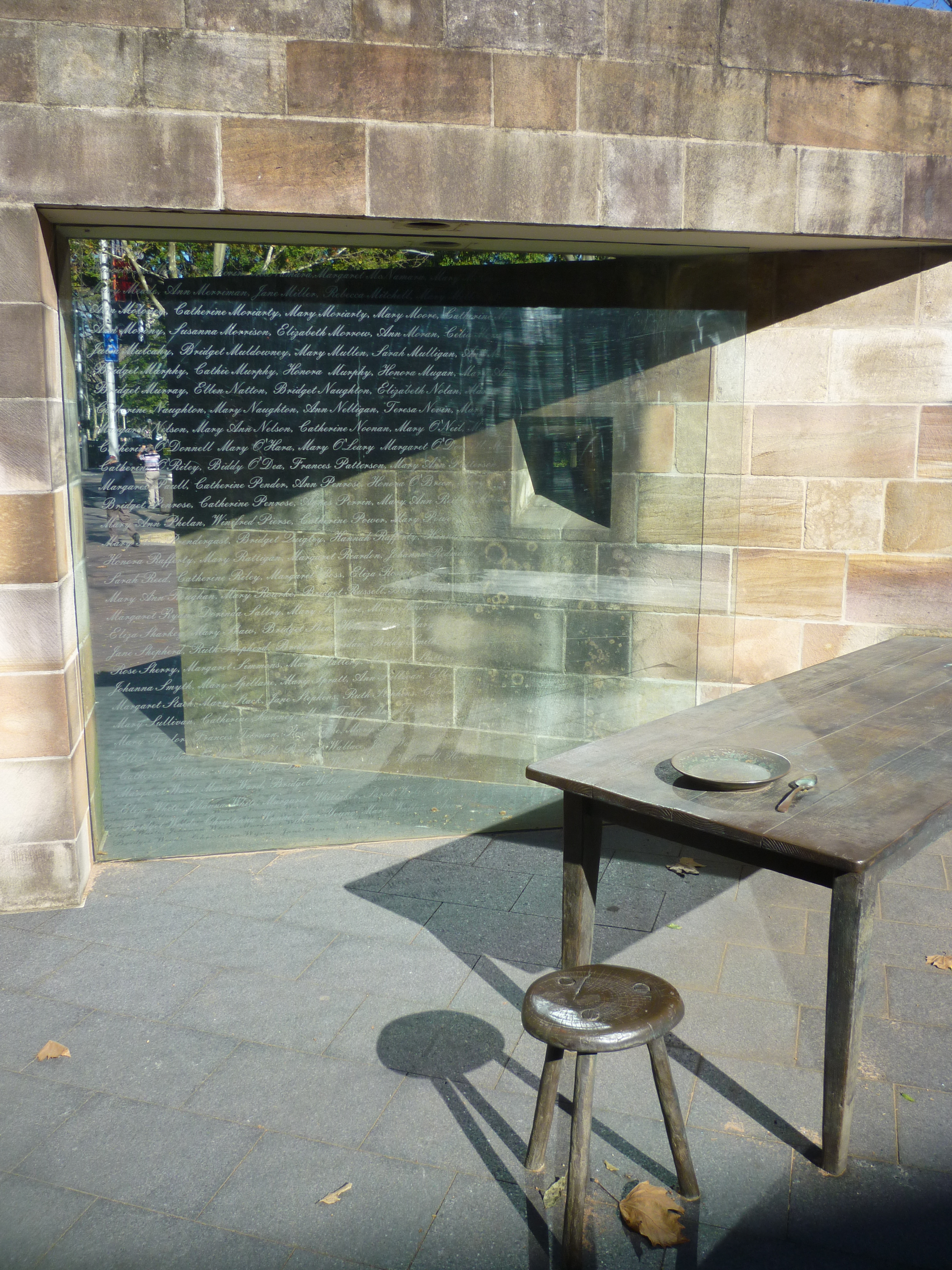
Detail of the monument to the Great Irish Famine at Hyde Park Barracks, Sydney in Australia

- Melbourne, Victoria. In 1998 a memorial in the form of a Famine Rock with plaque was erected on the foreshore of Hobsons Bay, Port Phillip at Williamstown. This was the 150th anniversary of the arrival of the first boat load of Irish Famine orphan girls. In 2013 Hobsons Bay City Council, in consultation with Irish Famine Orphan Heritage & Commemoration Day's Debra Vaughan, erected an Irish Famine Orphans Bay Trail Marker, part of a 23 km (14 mi) trail. This tells the local story of the six Earl Grey Scheme Irish Famine Orphan ships which landed around 1,700 teenagers in Williamstown, via Lady Kennaway, Pemberton, New Liverpool, Diadem, Derwent, and Eliza Caroline. Since 1998, over 170 people meet annually on the second-last Sunday of November to share a sacred yet secular ceremony to mark the Great Famine with the Australian Irish community & descendants. Around the circumference of the plaque are two lines from Amhrán na bPrátaí Dubha (Song of the Black Potatoes) by Irish poet Máire Ní Dhroma: "Ní hé Dia a cheap riamh an obair seo; Daoine bochta chur le fuacht is fán." In English, 'God never planned this work; Poor people put out in the cold and set wandering'.
- Sydney, New South Wales. The Australian Monument to the Great Irish Famine is located in the courtyard wall of the Hyde Park Barracks, Macquarie Street, Sydney. Symbolising the experiences of young Irishwomen fleeing the Great Irish Famine of 1845–1849, and funded by the NSW Government, the Irish Government and the Irish Australians, it was sculpted by Angela and Hossein Valamanesh and unveiled in 1999. There are 420 names etched into glass panels, representing the millions of people affected by the famine, a loy (potato-digging spade), and potatoes on a shelf. A table cuts across a wall, representing the famine on one side and the new world on the other. The names are those of some of the 2,253 orphaned teenaged girls who came to Sydney, between 1848 and 1850 under the Earl Grey Scheme, and initially were accommodated at the barracks.

== See also ==
- Legacy of the Great Irish Famine
- List of famines
- List of memorials
