= Famine walls =

Wall-building projects in Ireland from famine times

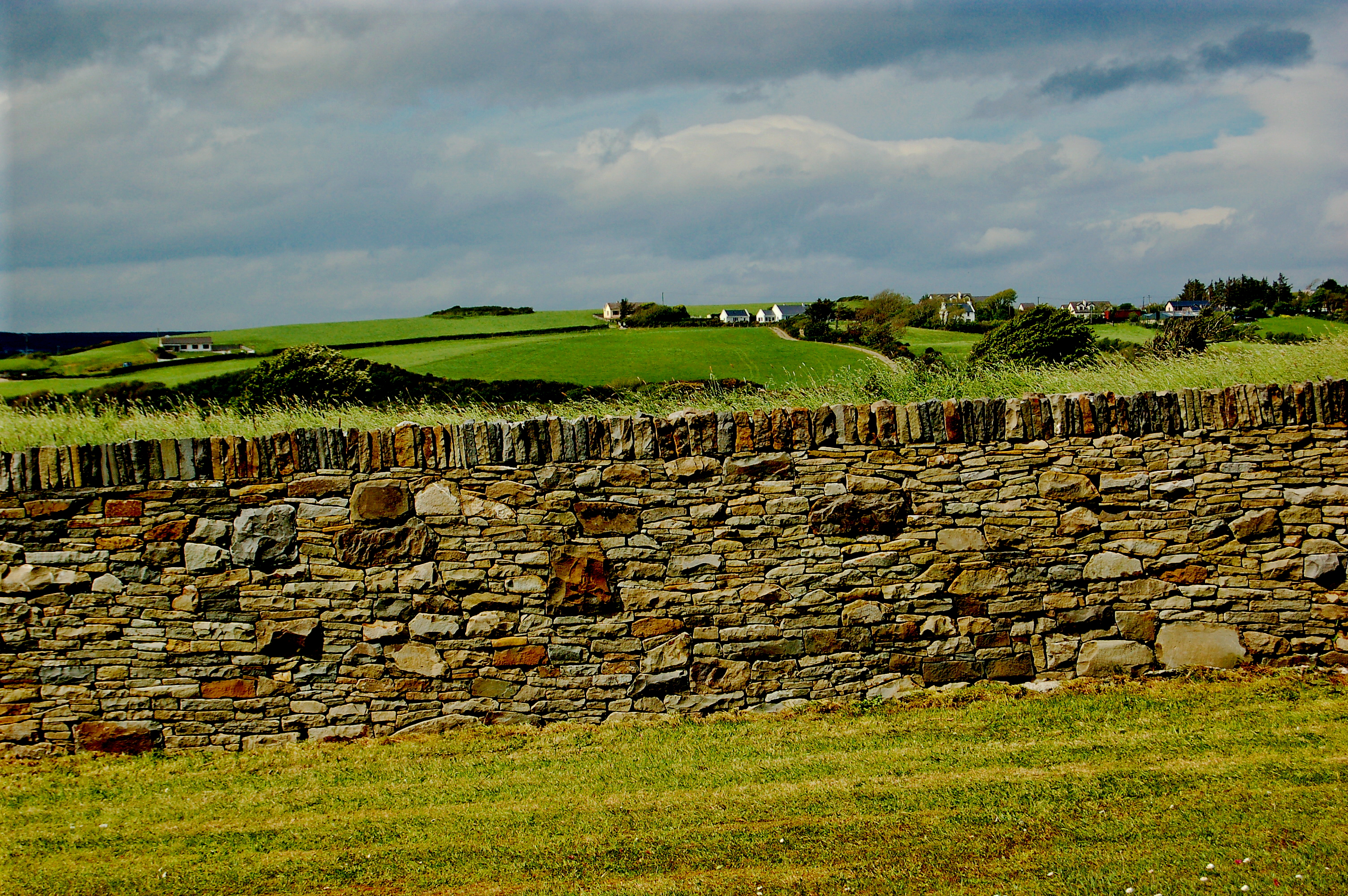
A section of wall from County Clare, Ireland

Famine walls were built throughout Ireland, especially in the west, in the mid-19th century, during the Great Famine. The walls were built as famine-relief works projects, sponsored by landlords and churches to provide work and income for unemployed peasants. The walls are generally around 8–10 feet (2.4–3.0 m) high and 300 yards (270 m) long, though many reach over 5km.

== Purpose ==
Many of the walls served little practical purpose other than giving work to the poor and clearing the land of stones. The stones were collected from nearby fields and mountains and stacked on top of each other. However, one particularly important use of the famine walls was to establish and divide the properties of farmers and locals.

During the early years of the famine, the British government's primary method of famine relief was through employing poor people in public works projects, including building walls, roads, and drainage systems. However, the government was only willing to provide limited charitable projects for the unemployed, believing that wealthy landlords should take on the bulk of the responsibility for famine relief, especially as time went on and more people applied for aid. Thus many landlords, churches, and other charitable organisations funded these walls independently.

Performing demanding physical labour building stone walls served as a way for the unemployed to "prove" their need and that they were deserving of aid, due to the common perception that the poor were taking advantage of charity. The combination of intense physical stress and malnutrition from lack of food caused many labourers to die at worksites. Working in close quarters, these weakened people were also susceptible to diseases like typhus, which contributed to high death tolls while building these walls.

== Labour ==
Both men and women were hired to build famine walls. Workdays were ten hours long, and women were hired to carry stones to the walls, while men and boys older than ten cut and stacked stones. Women and children earned 4 pence per day, and men earned 10 pence, though everyone was given rations of cornmeal every two weeks.

The total number of labourers working on government-led famine-relief works projects peaked at over 700,000 in 1847, though this figure includes all projects, not just wall-building. It also does not include projects sponsored by private individuals and charities, so it is difficult to know exactly how many people were employed building famine walls.

== Memorials ==
Many famine walls that remain today are maintained as famine memorials. Some are part of parkland and can be seen along hiking trails, such as in the Burren National Park and Slieve Gullion Forest Park. Others, like the wall in Ballyhogue, Co. Wexford are recognised as protected structures by local authorities. Heritage organisations encourage people to visit famine walls as a way to remember this period in Irish history and to honor the people who worked on these projects.

Jurisdictional issues can sometimes make maintaining famine walls difficult. When the walls cross through multiple counties, or through both public and private land, certain areas of wall can receive more maintenance than others. This can also cause problems for public access when reaching the walls requires passing through private property.

== See also ==
- Legacy of the Great Irish Famine
- List of memorials to the Great Famine
