= National Day of Commemoration =

Commemoration of Irish deaths in wars or UN peacekeeping missions

- Observed by: Ireland
- Date: Nearest Sunday to 11 July
- Frequency: Annual

In Ireland, the National Day of Commemoration (Irish: Lá Cuimhneacháin Náisiúnta) commemorates all Irish people who died in past wars or United Nations peacekeeping missions. It occurs on the Sunday nearest 11 July (see Irish Calendar), the anniversary of the date in 1921 that a truce was signed ending the Irish War of Independence. (Note: Due to fall on 12 July, the 1998 ceremony was moved to 5 July to avoid coinciding with the opening stage of the 1998 Tour de France.) The principal ceremony is held at the Royal Hospital Kilmainham, Dublin, Ireland.

== Background ==
The commemoration of Irish soldiers and wars has been fragmented within Ireland for historical and political reasons.

Ceremonies to honour Irish soldiers who fought in the First World War have been held in Ireland in November on Remembrance Sunday and Remembrance Day since the war's end. These are mainly organised by the Royal British Legion and observed by Unionists and ex-servicemen and relatives. The focal points were St Patrick's Cathedral and the Irish National War Memorial Gardens, both in Dublin. Though many Irish nationalists served in Irish regiments of the British Army prior to independence, this was not generally held in high esteem by later generations. Independent Ireland remained neutral in World War II, and although thousands of its citizens served in the allied armies, the state did not at first mark this. (Note: In the 1990s the Office of Public Works renovated the Memorial Gardens and the state has supported subsequent Battle of the Somme commemorations held there by the British Legion.)

Commemoration of the Irish War of Independence was muted by the bitterness of the Irish Civil War that followed from it. The preceding 1916 Easter Rising against British rule in Ireland was the focus, with Easter Day considered the "National Day of Commemoration". There was a major parade each Easter until 1971, when the Troubles in Northern Ireland made the commemoration of the earlier Irish Republican rebels more problematic in symbolism. (Note: The Easter parade was revived in 2006, after the Northern Ireland peace process.) Smaller official commemorations persisted at Arbour Hill Prison.

Within the Defence Forces, a Commemoration Day for deceased former members is held on All Souls' Day, 2 November. 11 July, the anniversary of the 1921 truce, had already been a special Army holiday before being the base date for the National Day of Commemoration.

== Establishment ==
In 1974, the coalition government proposed Saint Patrick's Day as a day for commemorating all Irish people who had given their lives in wars, marked with a message from the President, prayer and a moment of silence. The Fianna Fáil opposition objected. In the early 1980s, in response to the Northern Ireland Troubles, the Glencree Centre for Peace and Reconciliation in County Wicklow was organising "Walks of Remembrance" around sites in Dublin significant to all historical combatants. In 1983, the Irish Defence Forces were represented in the British Legion's Remembrance Sunday service in Saint Patrick's Cathedral, Dublin, under the flag of the United Nations. This was controversial and the Fianna Fáil opposition suggested a separate day of commemoration would be more inclusive.

An informal Oireachtas all-party committee was established in late 1984 to examine the question of a single National Day of Commemoration. It held four meetings and reported to the government in October 1985. The view of this committee was that there should be a religious service and a military ceremony. This has been the tradition since, although Noel Treacy complained that the military presence was "on a small scale compared with that visualised by the all party committee".

The first National Day of Commemoration was held on 13 July 1986 in the Garden of Remembrance. Old IRA veterans objected to the venue, which commemorates those who died in "the cause of Irish freedom", being used to honour British Army veterans. The absence was noted of Leader of the Opposition, Charles Haughey, and Lord Mayor of Dublin, Bertie Ahern, both represented by subordinates. This was ascribed to discontent within Fianna Fáil about the event.

Haughey became Taoiseach after the February 1987 election. He announced the commemoration ceremony would be replaced by separate church services by the various denominations, with no military or government presence. The opposition parties objected, and both sides negotiated a compromise, whereby the ceremony, and the commemorative plaque which had been unveiled in 1986 by President Patrick Hillery, were moved to the Royal Hospital. This, originally a British Army hospital, is now the Irish Museum of Modern Art. However Irish Republicans and some IRA veterans of the Irish War of Independence objected to the presence of the British Legion at the ceremony. Subsequent ceremonies have not proved controversial.

== Ceremonies ==
One of the main recommendations made by the All-Party Oireachtas Committee was that the National Day of Commemoration should be organised in a way which would reflect its national importance, which would encourage people of different traditions to participate and which would attract the interest and support of the public. The current service and ceremonies closely follow these recommendations.

The military and religious ceremonies are held in the presence of the President, the Taoiseach and other members of the Government of Ireland, members of the Oireachtas, the Council of State, the Diplomatic Corps, the Judiciary, relatives of 1916 leaders, next-of-kin of those who died on service with the UN, Northern Ireland representatives and a wide cross-section of the community, including ex-servicemen and ex-servicewomen.

Representatives of the three divisions of the Defence Forces parade and render military honours. Since its inception, music has been provided by the combined bands of the several Army Commands and Dr. Bernadette Greevy until her death in September 2008.

The ceremonies begin with an interfaith service, comprising prayers, hymns and readings by senior representatives of the main Christian denominations and of the Jewish and (since 1994) Islamic faiths.

The military ceremonies include an honour guard of the Cadet School, the laying of a wreath by the President on behalf of the people of Ireland, Reveille, the raising of the national flag and the playing of the National Anthem.

The National Day of Commemoration is, along with Easter Sunday, Easter Monday, and Saint Patrick's Day, one of the days on which the Department of the Taoiseach's protocol section has advised all government buildings to fly the national flag.

The main 2012 ceremony moved from the Royal Hospital Kilmainham to the Collins Barracks campus of the National Museum of Ireland, as the Kilmainham site closed for renovation. Regional ceremonies are planned for Sligo Town Hall; Kilkenny Castle; NUI Galway; Fitzgerald's Park, Cork; Limerick City Hall; and Bishops Palace Museum, Waterford.

The ceremony returned to the Royal Hospital in 2013.

== See also ==
- National Famine Commemoration Day
