= Galway Famine Ship Memorial =

Monument in County Galway, Ireland

Coordinates: 53.26194°N 9.06429°W

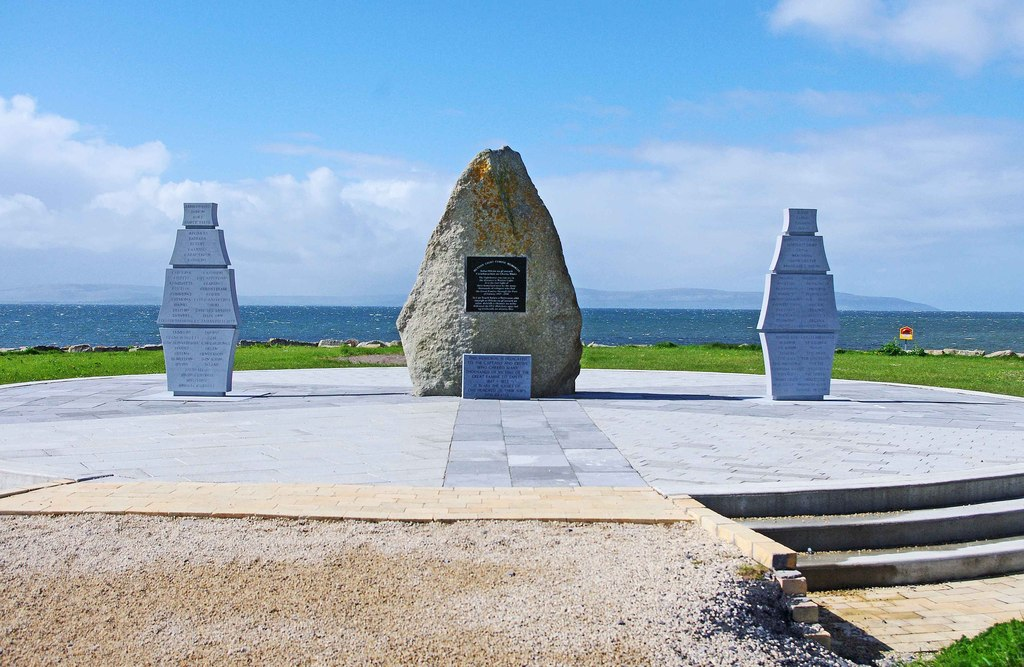
Famine Ship Memorial, Celia Griffin Memorial Park, Galway

The Galway Famine Ship Memorial is a memorial located in Celia Griffin Memorial Park in Salthill, County Galway, Ireland. It was unveiled on 4 July 2012. The monument is an expansion of a pre-existing monument to Celia Griffin, a girl who died at age 6 on the streets of Galway during the Great Famine. Flanking the original monument, made of limestone, are two sandstone monuments carved in the shape of ships' sails. Each sail is engraved with the names of 50 ships which carried those escaping the famine. These ships, sometimes known as coffin ships, were often poorly maintained and allowed for the rapid spread of disease, resulting in many deaths during the voyages.

== See also ==
- List of memorials to the Great Famine
- National Famine Memorial, Murrisk, County Mayo
