= Legacy of the Great Irish Famine =

Impact of 1845–1852 mass starvation

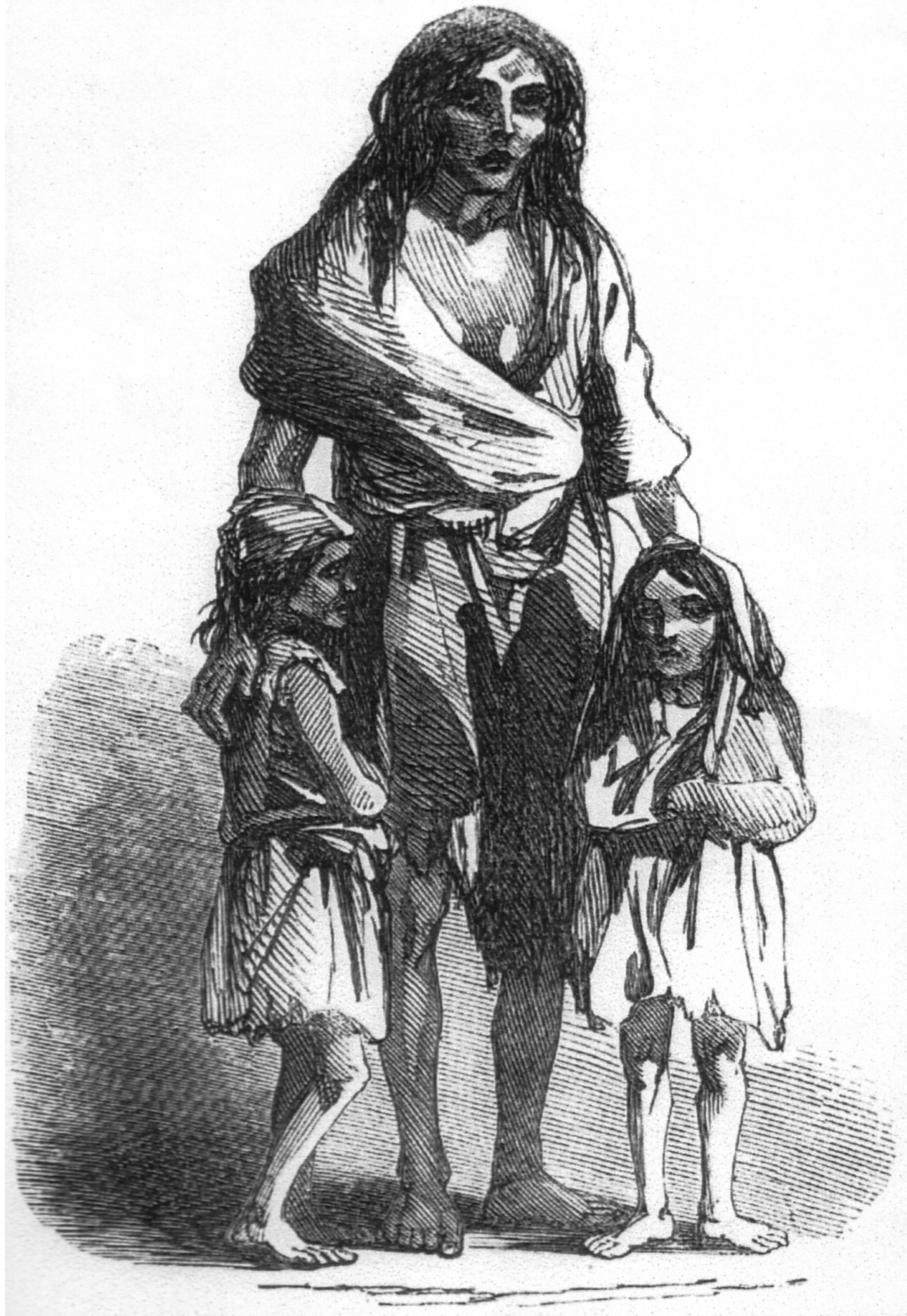
An 1849 depiction of Bridget O'Donnell and her two children during the famine, Kilrush Poor Law Union

The legacy of the Great Famine shaped modern Ireland in profound and lasting ways. Known in Irish as An Gorta Mór ("The Great Hunger") and An Drochshaol ("The Bad Life"), the famine transformed Ireland's population, language, politics, and cultural life. Between 1845 and 1852, the failure of the potato crop led to widespread hunger, disease, eviction, and emigration across Ireland. Approximately one million people died and at least another million emigrated during and immediately after the famine.

The Great Famine is widely regarded as a turning point in Irish history and is often treated as the dividing line between pre-Famine Ireland and modern Ireland. Its effects reshaped landholding patterns, contributed to the decline of the Irish language in many regions, and intensified political tensions surrounding British rule in Ireland.

Large-scale emigration during and after the famine contributed to the growth of Irish communities in the United States, Canada, Australia, and Great Britain. Many emigrants and their descendants remained closely connected to Irish political causes and later played an important role in movements for Irish independence. Historians and political commentators have continued to debate the British government's response to the famine, including whether its policies amounted to genocide.

From the late twentieth century onward, the famine became the subject of extensive commemoration, scholarship, literature, music, and film in Ireland and among the Irish diaspora.

== Political and cultural impact ==
=== In Ireland ===
Political reaction resulting from the Great Irish Famine was muted, because of the extremely limited electoral franchise that existed at the time. Irish politics in the 1820s to 1840s had been dominated by the Catholic Emancipation and "Repeal" movements under Daniel O'Connell. (The Independent Irish Party, formed in June 1852, disintegrated within four years, but it was in major decline from 1853 when tenants benefited from a recovery in agricultural prices.)

Outside the mainstream, too, reaction was slow. The 1848 Young Ireland rebellion under Thomas Davis, though occurring at the start of the Famine, was hardly impacted upon by the Famine, as much as by the clash between the "constitutional" nationalism and Catholicism of O'Connell and the pluralist republicanism of Davis. Another rebellion would not occur again until the 1860s under the Fenians/Irish Republican Brotherhood. Historians have speculated that, such was the economic and social impact on Ireland, the nation was numbed into inaction for decades afterwards; in other words, that politics mattered less to people than survival after the traumatic experiences of the late 1840s and early 1850s.

Though its electorate was a small part of the population (as elsewhere in the United Kingdom of Great Britain and Ireland), those Irish privileged to vote continued until the mid-1870s to vote for the two major British political parties, the Conservatives and the Liberals, with more votes and seats going to the latter, even though it had been the party of government during the Famine. The introduction of the secret ballot in 1872 enabled the Home Rule League to largely replace the Liberals in Irish politics in 1874. The Home Rule League was reconstituted as the Irish Parliamentary Party, under Charles Stewart Parnell in the 1880s; Parnell was also instrumental in establishing the Irish Land League, to achieve land reform. A large body of voters continued to vote for unionists, who wished to maintain the Union that joined Britain and Ireland.

The British Royal Family avoided some censure, due to their perceived impotence in political affairs. Although some believed the myth that Queen Victoria (known in Ireland in later decades as the "Famine Queen") had only donated a miserly £5 to famine relief, in fact the sum was £2,000 (equivalent to £217,000 in 2026 measured by Purchasing power from CPI), from her personal resources.This £2000 compares to £170,000 raised by the general public. The Ottoman Sultan,Abdülmecid I,is reported to have offered £10,000 in aid but was requested to reduce this to £1000 to avoid embarrassing the Queen. On instruction of the Lord Lieutenant of Ireland Victoria made what was largely seen as a propaganda visit in 1849. However, this visit was conducted under stringent security measures and was not free from protests or controversy. The celebrations associated with her visit just after the famine were compared to "illuminating a graveyard" in a newspaper editorial at the time.

An additional social impact due to the high numbers of children orphaned was that for some young women, prostitution was one of few options available. Some of these young women became known as Wrens of the Curragh.

=== Linguistic consequences ===
It is estimated that one and a half million people died during the Famine and that a million emigrated between 1846 and 1851. A large proportion of these were Irish speakers, and the poorest districts, from which emigration continued to flow, were generally Irish-speaking. The Famine was not the only reason for the decline of the language (the general exclusion of Irish from public life and the influence of the English-speaking clergy and middle classes also played a part) but it was a conspicuous element. This led to the creation of an Ireland which thought of itself as essentially English-speaking, though with a persistent and influential reaction in the form of organisations such as the Gaelic League and the growth of a network of urban Irish-speaking activists from the late nineteenth century on.

In pre-Famine Ireland Irish was the language both of a rich folk culture and a strong literary tradition. The latter persisted in the form of Irish language manuscripts containing both prose and poetry: a single collection would give the reader access to a substantial part of the literature. Many such manuscripts were taken to America by emigrants in the 1840s and after.

The emigration of numerous Irish speakers to America as an immediate or long-term result of the Famine led to a movement there for the maintenance of the Irish language. This was marked in part by the foundation of Philo-Celtic Societies and the founding of the monthly journal An Gaodhal in 1881, the first such publication anywhere in which Irish was extensively used.

=== Irish emigrants abroad ===
If the political elite in Ireland remained tolerant of British political parties and the monarchy, emigrants were not so. Many Irish emigrants to the United States quickly associated with separatist republican groups and organisations like the IRB. The political liberties and freedom of opportunity they encountered in the States confirmed for them the potential of an independent Ireland and often made them more passionate and optimistic than some of their brethren at home.

The Famine and its causes became a major platform for emigrant anger, as it was the main cause for most of them being emigrants in the first place. John Mitchel, a journalist by trade (who had written for Thomas Davis's newspaper, The Nation before leaving to set up his own paper, only to be arrested, tried for sedition and transported to the penal colony of Van Diemen's Land) who continued to campaign against British rule in Ireland after moving to the United States. Analysing the famine, he wrote:

The Almighty indeed sent the potato blight but the English created the famine... a million and half men, women and children were carefully, prudently and peacefully slain by the English government. They died of hunger in the midst of abundance which their own hands created.
John Mitchel

Mitchel's commentary expressed the anger felt by many emigrants, who saw themselves as the dispossessed, forced from Ireland by a famine they blamed on British government policies. The famine became a constant issue with Irish Americans, who to an extent unrivalled among other emigrant communities in the United States, remained emotionally attached to their native land. Leaders such as John Devoy in later decades came to play a major role in supporting Irish independence. It was no accident that the President of Dáil Éireann, Éamon de Valera in 1920 chose to travel to the United States, not elsewhere, in his efforts to get the Irish Republic recognised and accepted, or that when Michael Collins launched special bonds to fund the new Republic, many were sold to Irish Americans.

== Genocide ==
During and after the famine, some commentators have claimed that the British government's response, while it occurred, amounted to genocide, a contention which is disputed.

American professor of international law and human rights campaigner Francis Boyle has claimed in his 2011 work United Ireland, Human Rights and International Law that the famine amounted to genocide by the British government, a view which was supported by historian James Mullin.

However, numerous Irish, British and American scholars, such as academics F. S. L. Lyons, John A. Murphy, R. F. Foster, and James S. Donnelly Jr., as well as historians Cecil Woodham-Smith, Peter Gray, Ruth Dudley Edwards, and Cormac Ó Gráda have denied claims of a deliberate policy of genocide. All historians generally agree that British policies during the Famine (particularly those applied by the Ministry of Lord John Russell) were misguided, ill-informed, and counter-productive, and that had a similar crisis occurred in England instead of Ireland then the government's response would have been different.

There are public records that there was enough grain and meal in Ireland during that period to have prevented the food shortage caused by the potato blight. Famine conditions were allowed to continue for a number of years in the 1840s, while the surplus food was not distributed.

Some have claimed that because emigration was allowed, the Famine period does not qualify as genocide. The poverty, evictions, workshops where workers paid off the cost of their tickets, and the overcrowding and unhygienic conditions on emigration ships, all combined to make the journey of emigrating as great a risk as staying and trying to survive starvation. By modern definitions, the term "refugee" would be more accurate than "emigrant" to describe those who fled Ireland.

== Commemorations ==
A graph of the populations of Ireland and Europe indexed against 1750 showing the disastrous consequence of the 1845–1849 famine.

Ireland commemorated the 150th anniversary of the Great Famine in the 1990s.

The 150th was a contrast, in many ways, with the 100th anniversary in the 1940s. Then, only a few commemorations were held – the most significant of which was a commissioned volume of Famine history edited by R. Dudley Edwards and T. Desmond Williams (though not published until 1956), and the important 'Famine Survey' undertaken by the Irish Folklore Commission in 1945.

Beyond these important cultural aspects, emigration was a continuing and embarrassing fact of Irish political life in the 1940s, and there was no natural constituency for the famine victims, who had died or emigrated. Some commentators were embarrassed that their ancestors had somehow fed themselves by inevitably not sharing food with the victims, a form of "survivor guilt".

The 1990s marked a significant shift in attitudes towards commemorating the Famine, as hundreds of events took place in Ireland and throughout the Irish diaspora, some of which received sponsorship from the National Famine Commemoration Committee based in the Department of the Taoiseach, led by Avril Doyle TD.

At the Great Famine Event held in Millstreet, County Cork, a statement from British Prime Minister Tony Blair was read aloud, apologising for the failure of past British governments to adequately address the crisis. A large number of new research studies on the Famine were produced, many detailing for the first time local experiences. Historians re-examined all aspects of the Famine experience; from practical issues like the number of deaths and emigrants, to the long-term impact it had on society, sexual behaviour, land holdings, property rights and the entire Irish identity, personified in the conservatism of Cardinal Cullen, that persisted into the 1900s.

In 2010, Britain failed to send a diplomatic representative to the opening of the National Famine Commemoration at the Murrisk Millennium Peace Park, at the foot of Croagh Patrick, County Mayo. Representatives of 14 other nations were present including the United States and Australia as well as the European Parliament. The Irish government was represented by several ministers. The Taoiseach and President did not attend in person, but sent staff members.

== The Famine in song ==
The Famine is also commemorated in song, both from the period and from modern times. Irish novelist and songwriter, Brendan Graham has written a number of novels and songs on An Gorta Mór – the Great Irish Famine.

"The Fairhaired Boy" – This song written by Brendan Graham in a traditional narrative style song form where there are no choruses, the hook of the song being contained in the last line of each stanza with the pull of the story being used to keep the listener's interest alive.

"Crucán na bPáiste" – 'the burial place of (unbaptised) children' – lies on a hilltop in Maumtrasna, County Mayo, overlooking Loch Na Fooey, and Lough Mask in Ireland. It is a lament by a mother for a child she buries there during Aimsir an Drochshaoil ('The Time of the Bad Life' – the Famine). The song was also written by Graham.

Another of Graham's Famine songs, "Ochón an Ghorta Mhóir / Lament of the Great Hunger", was commissioned by the Irish Government, as part of the Ceól Reoite (Frozen Music – after Goethe's 'Architecture is frozen music') Millennial Project. Fourteen Irish composers were asked to pick a monument of national significance and to write a piece of music/song which would release from it the music frozen within. Graham chose the Curvilinear Glasshouses at Dublin's National Botanic Gardens (Ireland), constructed at the time of An Gorta Mór, by monies diverted from research to find a cure for the potato blight afflicting Ireland.

"You Raise Me Up" – Has been recorded by some 400 artists (including Westlife, Josh Groban, Brian Kennedy and Secret Garden, Daniel O'Donnell, Helene Fischer, Il Divo, Russell Watson and Paul Potts) and has become one of the most successful songs in popular music history.

In Quebec, 2011, Grahan's shorter narrative and song piece – From Famine to Freedom – Ireland to Grosse Ile – was performed by the Quebec Symphony Orchestra and soloist Méav Ní Mhaolchatha, with Graham's narration translated into French.

In August 2012 Brendan Graham composed and presented From Famine to Freedom – Ireland to Australia, a commemoration in word and song of those who suffered during An Gorta Mór – The Great Irish Famine – and of those who fled the Famine to establish a new life Australia.

Graham wrote a new song called, "Orphan Girl", dedicated to the memory of the 4,112, mainly teenage Irish orphan girls, who were given a free passage to Australia from Workhouses in every county of Ireland between 1848 and 1850.

A famous modern song on the famine is "The Fields of Athenry", by Pete St. John. Written in three verses, it deals with a fictitious but realistic story of "Michael" being deported to Botany Bay for stealing corn to feed his starving family. Performed in folk, traditional and even reggae versions, it is often sung by supporters of Glasgow's Celtic F.C., many of whom are of Irish descent. The song itself sums up the sense of despair, anger and bitterness of famine victims. The song was also covered by Boston punk rock band, the Dropkick Murphys on their 2003 Blackout album.

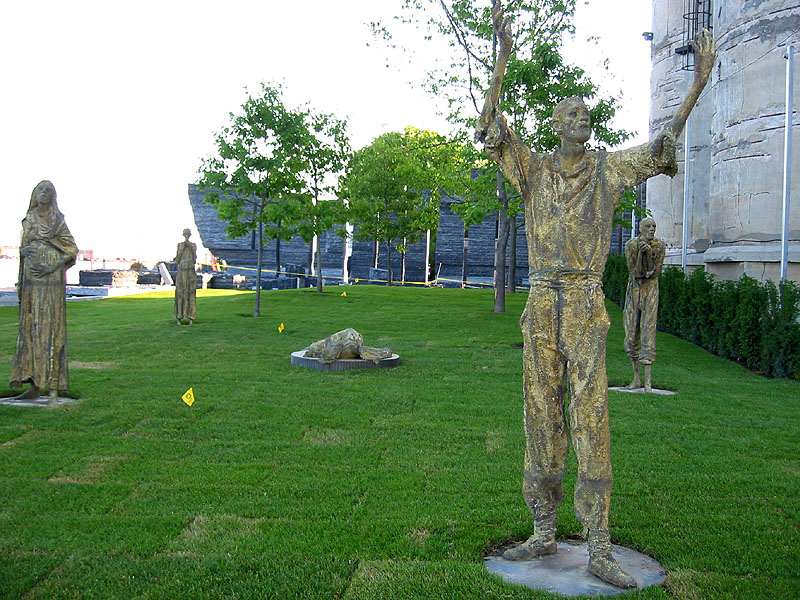
Rowan Gillespie's "Famine", in Ireland Park, Toronto Harbourfront

Luka Bloom's song 'Forgiveness' from his album Salty Heaven is sung from the point of view of an Irish Famine refugee who has relocated to Canada and who despite his suffering has chosen forgiveness over bitterness.

Luka Bloom's brother Christy Moore also has a song, written by Bloom but recorded by Moore, called 'The City of Chicago,' that chronicles the effects of the Famine and the subsequent mass emigration.

Pagan metal band Primordial also have a song about the Famine named "The Coffin Ships" on their 2005 album The Gathering Wilderness.

Another related song is "Famine" by Sinéad O'Connor, released on the Universal Mother album. The lyrics emphasise the political aspect of the famine.

== The Famine in film ==
- Wide Open Spaces, a 2009 comedy film focusing on the development of a prospective famine-themed theme park in modern-day Ireland .
- Black '47, a 2018 Irish period drama film set in 1847 in Connemara.
- Arracht, a 2019 Irish period drama set in 1845 in Connemara.

== Ireland and modern famine relief ==
Ireland has been at the forefront of international famine relief. In 1985 Bob Geldof, Irish rock star and founder of Live Aid, revealed that the people of Ireland had given more to his fundraising efforts per head of population than any other nation in the world. Irish NGOs Goal, Concern, Trócaire and Gorta play a central role in helping famine victims throughout Africa. In 2000, Bono, lead singer with Irish band U2, played a central role in campaigning for debt relief for African nations in the Jubilee 2000 campaign. The Irish famine experience continues to influence many Irish people in their attitudes towards the developing world and famine victims everywhere.
