= Famine Remembrance Park =

Famine memorial park located in Cleaghmore, Ballinasloe, County Galway

The Famine Remembrance Park (Irish: Páirc Chuimhneacháin An Ghorta) is a memorial park located in Cleaghmore, Ballinasloe, County Galway, Ireland. The park is in remembrance of the Great Famine (1845–1849), which saw the population of the country halved through death and emigration.

== History ==
The Famine Remembrance Park was a joint Town Council and community project, designed by Gerry Cleary and opened in 1998. The site located in Cleaghmore, Ballinasloe, County Galway was donated by the Trench family for the burial of hundreds of people during the Great Famine. It now contains over 8,000 plants and shrubs.

The park features a dedication and memorial monument, designed by John O'Connor and erected by the Ballinasloe Historical Society. It also features an urn monument designed by Helen Comerford.
