= National Famine Commemoration Day =

Annual observance in Ireland

The National Famine Commemoration Day (Irish: Lá Cuimhneacháin Náisiúnta an Ghorta Mhóir) is an annual observance in Ireland commemorating the Great Famine. A week-long programme of events leads up to the day, usually a Sunday in May. It has been organised officially by the government of Ireland since 6 May 2008. The main event is held in a different place each year, rotating among the four provinces of Ireland. There is also an international event, held in a place important for the Irish diaspora.

Events at the main venue include lectures, arts events, and visits to places connected to the Famine. The government encourages local events, and a minute's silence on the day, or the preceding Friday for schools and workplaces.

== History ==
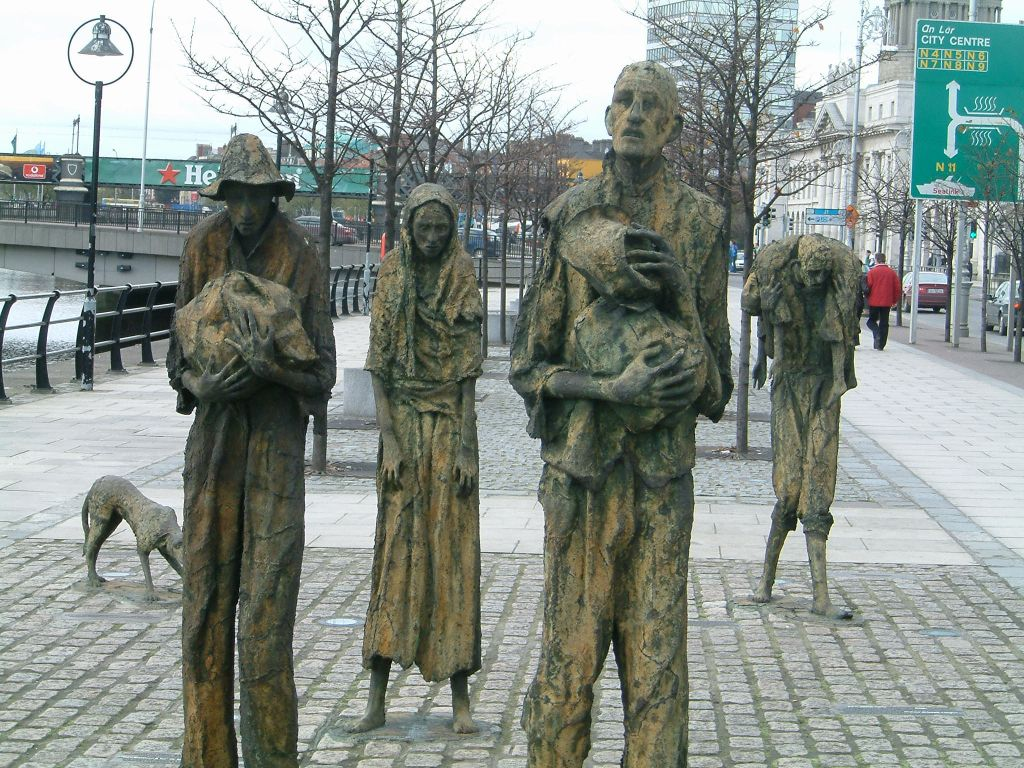
Famine memorial in Dublin, endpoint of the CCIFV walk

The Great Famine lasted from 1845 to about 1850, with "Black '47" the worst year. In 1994 the government established a committee to fund events and works commemorating the Famine's 150th anniversary, which operated until 2000.

In County Mayo from 1987, an annual "Famine Walk" from Louisburgh to Doolough has commemorated the Doolough Tragedy of 30–31 March 1849. From 2004, the Committee for the Commemoration of the Irish Famine Victims (CCIFV) has organised an annual commemoration each May in Dublin, in which members dressed as starving peasants walk from the Garden of Remembrance to the famine memorial sculptures in front of the Custom House. The CCIFV lobbied for official recognition and received various messages of support from politicians.

Taoiseach Bertie Ahern answered several Dáil questions on the CCIFV and Famine commemoration generally. In 2005, he was reluctant to countenance a designated annual national day to commemorate the Famine; he favoured a single memorial to all major historical events, mentioning the 1798 Rebellion and the Land War. In 2006, he said the Department of the Taoiseach was examining submissions on Famine commemoration. In 2007, he was "positively disposed towards the establishment of a memorial day". That year, the day of the CCIFV walk received a modicum of official recognition, with one reception hosted by Conor Lenihan, Minister of State responsible for food aid, and another by Bertie Ahern at Iveagh House. The Friday before the 2008 CCIFV walk, the government issued a press release announcing that the state would in future organise an annual commemoration. That Sunday there was a reception hosted by Minister of State John Curran at the Custom House, Dublin before the CCIFV walk. A July press release of the Department of Community, Rural and Gaeltacht Affairs described this as "the first National Famine Commemoration Day".

In July 2008 Éamon Ó Cuív, the Minister for Community, Rural and Gaeltacht Affairs, established the National Famine Commemoration Committee, whose stated main objective was:

to consider the most appropriate arrangement for future national commemorations of the Great Famine. The general legacy of emigration, cultural loss and the decline of the Irish language, together with the specific issues of food security and the strong commitment of the Irish people to humanitarian aid and relief, are particular themes that will be explored by the Committee during its work.

This committee has recommended the venue for subsequent commemorations, and liaised with each local organising committee. The event is staged in each province in rotation. The 2011 event was scheduled for Ulster, and in October 2010 two Sinn Féin ministers in the Northern Ireland Executive discussed the possibility of a Northern Ireland host venue with Pat Carey, Ó Cuív's successor as the Republic's Minister for Community, Rural and Gaeltacht Affairs. In the event, Clones, County Monaghan, in the Republic, was chosen. Northern Ireland was the location of the next Ulster host: Newry, County Armagh in 2015.

In December 2016, Sinn Féin introduced a private member's bill seeking to have the commemoration held on the second Sunday of every May every year. Peadar Tóibín said, "we do not know at this late stage when the national Famine day will take place next year. This annual uncertainty over the commemoration date is shocking". Colm Brophy of Fine Gael introduced a similar bill in January 2017.

== Venues ==
Year	Irish Venue	Date	International Venue	Notes
2008	Dublin, County Dublin	25 May	—	official event, with minister officiating at the ceremony in the Custom house ancillary official reception.
2009	Skibbereen, County Cork	17 May	Canada (Toronto and Grosse Isle)	The first official commemoration. Skibbereen was particularly hard hit by the Famine.
2010	Murrisk, County Mayo	16 May	New York City	Site of the National Famine Monument.
2011	Clones, County Monaghan	10 September	Liverpool	The government denied CCIFV claims the event had been moved from May to avoid clashing with Queen Elizabeth II's state visit. Date was a Saturday, rather than Sunday, to avoid clashing with 10th anniversary of September 11 attacks.
2012	Drogheda, County Louth	13 May	Boston, United States	President Michael D. Higgins gave a lecture in Boston, while Taoiseach Enda Kenny attended the Drogheda event.
2013	Kilrush, County Clare	12 May	Sydney	—
2014	Strokestown, County Roscommon	11 May	New Orleans	Taoiseach Enda Kenny and Minister for Arts, Heritage and the Gaeltacht Jimmy Deenihan officiated at the Strokestown event.
2015	Newry, County Armagh	26 September	Saint John, New Brunswick, Canada	—
2016	Glasnevin Cemetery, Dublin	11 September	Philadelphia, USA	—
2017	Famine Warhouse 1848, Ballingarry, County Tipperary	30 September	—	—
2018	University College Cork	12 May	Williamstown, Melbourne	—
2019	Sligo	19 May	Phoenix, Arizona	—
2020	St Stephen's Green, Dublin	17 May	—	—
2021	Glasnevin Cemetery, Dublin	16 May	—	President Michael D. Higgins and Minister for Tourism, Culture, Arts, Gaeltacht, Sport and Media Catherine Martin officiated at the Glasnevin Cemetery event.

== See also ==
- National Day of Commemoration
