= Kilkenny Union Workhouse =

Workhouse in Kilkenny, Ireland

Coordinates: 52°39′20″N 7°14′43″W

Kilkenny Union Workhouse was a workhouse established in 1842 in Kilkenny, Ireland. The fifth-largest workhouse in Ireland at the time of its opening, it had a capacity for 1,300 inmates. During the Great Famine, it became severely overcrowded and housed over 4,300 people by 1851. In 2005–2006, a mass grave of at least 970 people, dating from 1847–1851, was discovered on the grounds of the institution. The workhouse was disestablished in the early 1920s, and the building has since served as a hospital, a depot, and as part of a shopping centre.

== Background ==
In the 19th century, the majority of the population of Ireland was rural and impoverished, with many resorting to begging. The severe condition of the Irish lower classes was the subject of frequent comment in contemporary reports and newspapers. During this period, Kilkenny was particularly poor and faced high unemployment. The decline of the local textile industry in the early 19th century led to Kilkenny being reported as the poorest county in Leinster. The south of the county, including the city, was densely populated and predominantly Irish-speaking.

In 1838, the existing Poor Law in Britain was extended to Ireland with the Poor Relief (Ireland) Act 1838. The Poor Law Amendment Act 1834, which established the workhouse system in England and Wales, was applied to Ireland with significant opposition. 126 workhouses were built in Ireland between 1839 and 1845, and another wave of construction saw 33 workhouses erected in the early 1850s. Almost all workhouses in Ireland, including that of Kilkenny, were built to the designs of George Wilkinson, resulting in highly standardised architecture.

== History ==
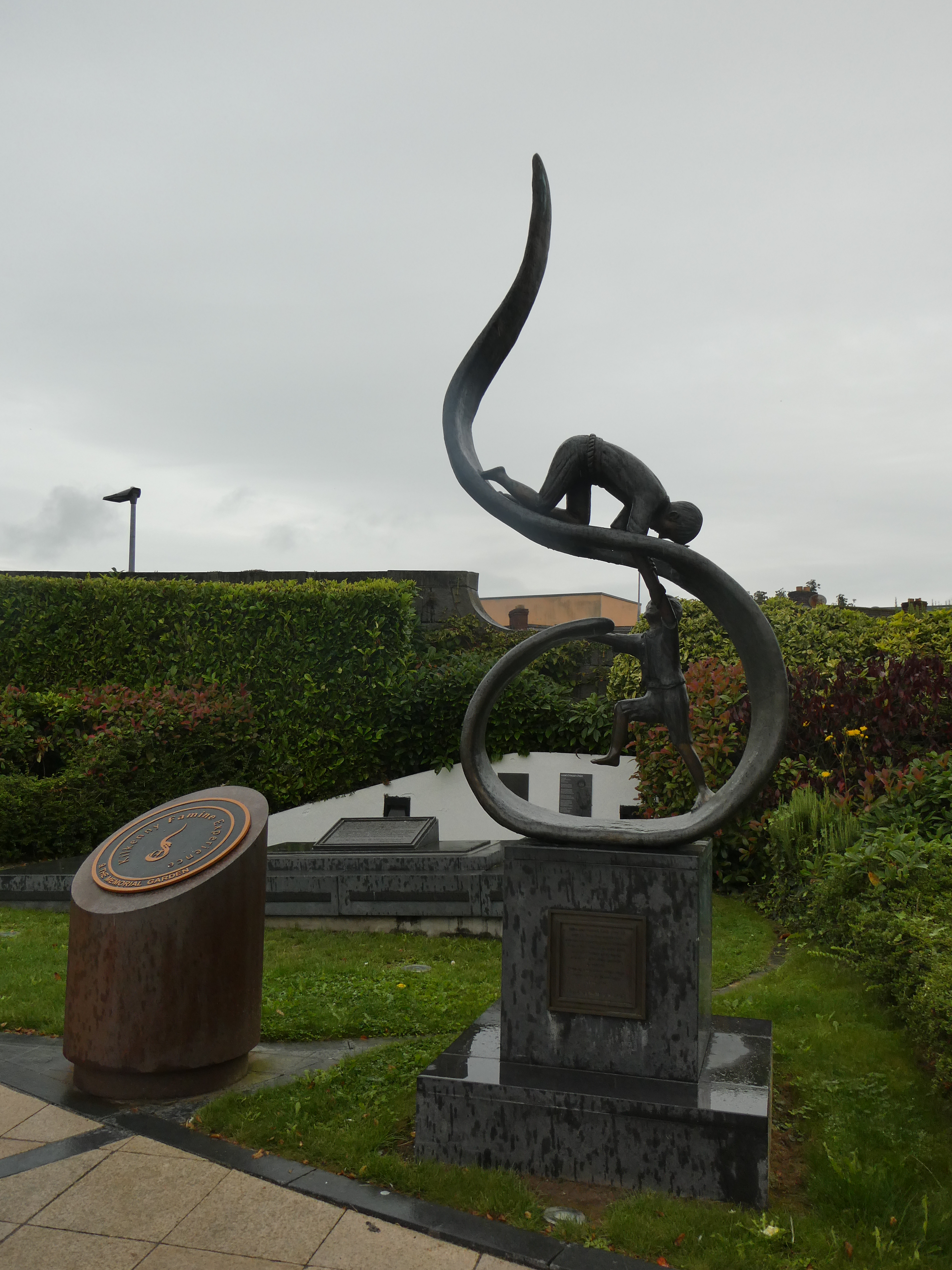
A memorial to the dead near the site of the Kilkenny Union Workhouse

Construction began in 1840, and the workhouse was opened in April 1842. At the time of opening, it had the capacity for 1,300 inmates and was the fifth-largest workhouse in Ireland. The inmates produced textiles, pins, and shoes, and did agricultural work in the neighboring fields.

In 1845–46, during the Great Famine, Kilkenny received an influx of people from other counties. Crowds gathered outside the workhouse, which eventually resulted in police being stationed to maintain order. The crisis deepened, with deaths by starvation and poverty exceeding 80 per month in the workhouse. In 1847, the death rate reached 200 per month. At the same time, a typhus epidemic led to mass casualties in the city, including at the workhouse. The workhouse became increasingly overcrowded, reaching 2,340 inmates by 1847 and 4,357 by 1851. Due to the overcrowding and infectious diseases, the authorities constructed auxiliary sheds and repurposed existing buildings in the city to house more people. Despite the overcrowding, the workhouse remained relatively functional, and sometimes provided illicit outdoor relief. It was able to provide each deceased inmate with a shroud and coffin. Burials took place in the northeast corner of the workhouse grounds until March 1851, when a more formal cemetery was acquired. In total, an estimated 4,111 people died in the workhouse and fever hospital during the Famine. Many of those who died at the workhouse would have been buried elsewhere when possible.

In 1875, operation of the workhouse was transferred to the Sisters of Mercy. In the 1920s, after the establishment of the Irish Free State, the workhouse system was abolished and the Kilkenny workhouse complex was converted into Kilkenny Central Hospital. From 1942 until 2007 the buildings were used as a depot by the Kilkenny County Council, and since then it has been part of MacDonagh Junction Shopping Centre.

== Archaeological investigation ==
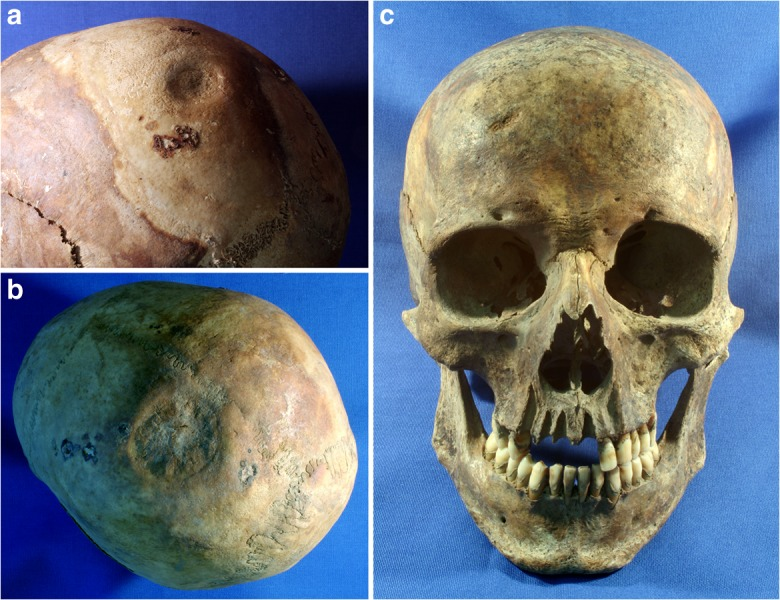
Three adult human skulls from the mass burial showing evidence of blunt-force trauma

In 2005, archaeologists discovered large amounts of human remains while assessing a site next to the former workhouse. In 2006, an excavation of the workhouse burial ground was undertaken. The excavation revealed a mass grave of at least 970 individuals in 63 grave pits, which is the largest mass burial ever discovered in Ireland. Around 5% of the burial ground remained unexcavated. One of the 63 pits was empty, which could indicate it was dug in anticipation before the external cemetery site was acquired. The mass grave was in use between 1847 and 1851. There was no local knowledge of this burial ground, and a thick deposit of soil covered the graves, which was possibly an attempt to conceal the site. The site was later used as the workhouse's garden. After scientific analysis, the bodies were reburied in a consecrated memorial garden near the former workhouse. In 2010 a ceremony was held in honour of the dead, which was attended by Catholic, Anglican, Methodist, and Presbyterian clergy, as well as military representatives and members of the general public.

Over half (56%) of the deceased in the mass grave were under the age of 18, and 25% were young children. The main cause of death for children was likely disease, such as relapsing fever, typhus, tuberculosis, or measles. Most of the children were stunted in growth and had Harris lines, and some had rickets or enamel hypoplasia. Nitrogen isotopes in the children's teeth were elevated, indicating chronic starvation. The stress of the workhouse setting, especially for those separated from their parents after weaning, also probably contributed to child mortality. Scurvy was prevalent across age groups, with signs of the condition being found in 499 of 970 skeletons, and significantly contributed to the mortality rate. It was particularly common among children and adolescents. Because skeletal markers of scurvy only appear after vitamin C is reintroduced to the diet, it is likely that many of the inmates were already suffering from severe scurvy before entering the workhouse and the rations provided were not sufficient for recovery. Tooth decay and tooth loss were also very common, due to heavy pipe-smoking. Grave goods were rare among the burials, although Rosaries, devotional medals, finger rings, and small pouches were found. Fragments of pottery, glass, and ceramic pipes were also excavated. Analysis of dental calculus indicated that some of those buried had access to eggs in their diet, which signifies that they were relatively well-off before the Famine.

== See also ==
- Teampaillin Bán
