= British rule in Ireland =

Evolution of British control over the island of Ireland

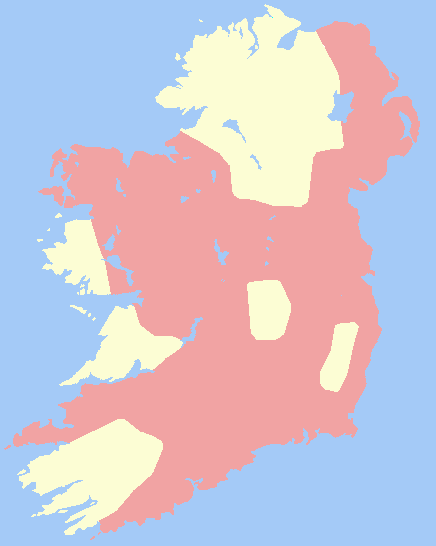
Lordship of Ireland (in pink) around 1300. Areas outside of that remained independent kingdoms.

British rule in Ireland was built upon the 12th-century Anglo-Norman invasion of Ireland on behalf of Kingdom of England, where parts of Ireland fell under English control. The full conquest of the island was completed in the 17th century after the Tudor conquest of Ireland. Most of Ireland gained independence from the United Kingdom following the Anglo-Irish War in the early 20th century. Initially formed as a Dominion called the Irish Free State in 1922, the Republic of Ireland became a fully independent nation state following the passage of the Statute of Westminster in 1931. It effectively became a republic with the passage of a new constitution in 1937, and formally became a republic with the passage of the Republic of Ireland Act in 1949. Northern Ireland remains part of the United Kingdom as a constituent country.

== Middle Ages ==
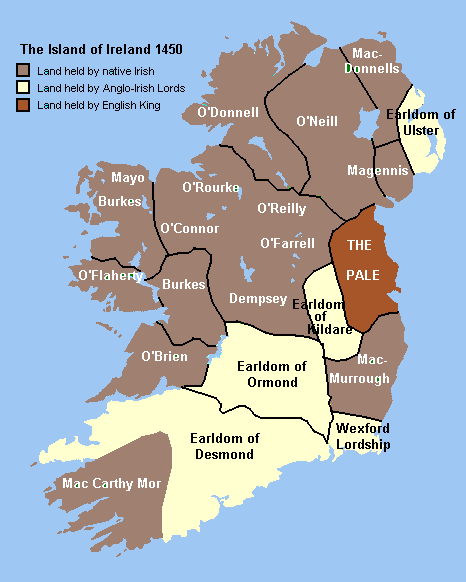
Map of areas of influence in Ireland c. 1450

From the late 12th century, the Anglo-Norman invasion of Ireland resulted in Anglo-Norman control of much of Ireland, over which the kings of England then claimed sovereignty. By the Late Middle Ages, Anglo-Norman control was limited to an area around Dublin known as the Pale.

Enacted in 1494, Poynings law ensured that the Irish parliament could not meet without the approval of England's monarch and Privy Council. In 1541, English king Henry VIII changed Ireland's status from a lordship to a kingdom, and he was proclaimed King of Ireland.

== Plantation and rebellion ==
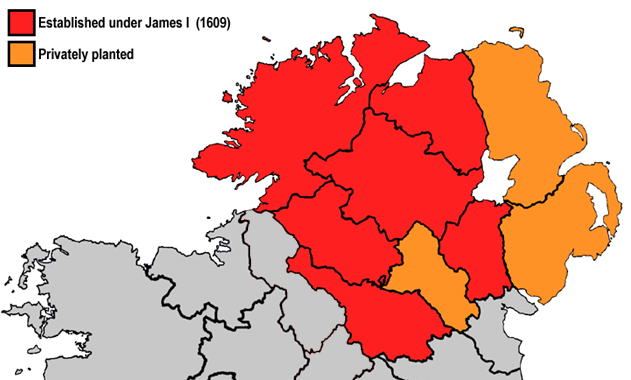
Map of Ulster, highlighting areas subject to British plantations

The Munster Plantation began in the late 16th century, and the Ulster Plantation in the 17th century. These events saw mostly Protestant colonists (primarily from England and Scotland) being given land in these provinces.

Coinciding largely with the Eleven Years' War, the Cromwellian conquest of Ireland was led by Oliver Cromwell between 1649 and 1651, resulting in the confiscation of land from many native landowners and regranting to Parliamentarian supporters.

Introduced in the 17th century, the Penal Laws outlawed the Catholic clergy and precluded Catholics in Ireland from owning or leasing land above a certain value, accessing higher education and certain professions, and gave primacy to the established church, the Church of Ireland. While these laws were later eased, including by the Treaty of Limerick which followed the Williamite War in Ireland (1688–1691), by 1778 Catholics still held only around 5% of land in Ireland.

== 18th and 19th centuries ==
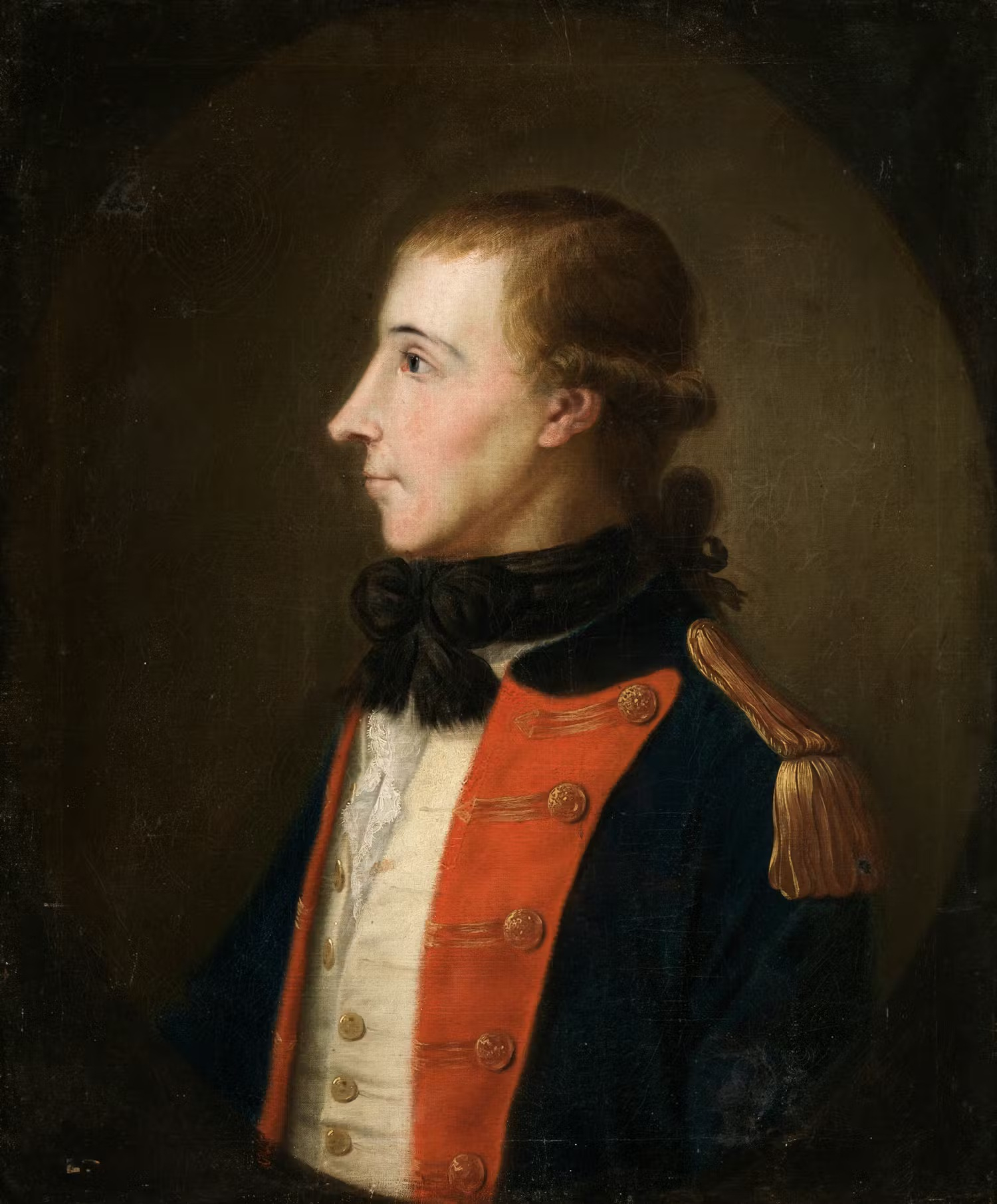
Wolfe Tone, one of the leaders of the United Irishmen

The United Irishmen Rebellion of 1798 (which sought to end British rule in Ireland) failed, and the 1800 Act of Union merged the Kingdom of Ireland into a combined United Kingdom of Great Britain and Ireland.

In the mid-19th century, the Great Famine (1845–1852) resulted in the death or emigration of over two million people. At the time, trade agreements were controlled by the British government and, whilst hundreds of thousands were suffering from hunger, Irish dairy products and wheat harvests were exported to Britain and other overseas territories.

== Independence and partition ==
A Home Rule Bill was passed in 1912 but not brought into law due to the outbreak of World War I in 1914. The Easter Rising of 1916 resulted in the execution of the rebellion's leaders. In the 1918 general election, the nationalist Sinn Féin party won a majority of Irish seats, and in 1919 these elected MPs declared the independence of the Irish Republic. The Irish War of Independence followed from 1919 to 1921. The Government of Ireland Act of 1920 and the Anglo-Irish Treaty of 1921 resulted in the formation of the Irish Free State, while Northern Ireland's MPs opted out to form Northern Ireland. Many foreign powers, including the United States in 1924, recognised the Irish Free State's independence, and the future Republic of Ireland was globally recognised as a legitimate member of the world community by the time the United Nations was formed in the 1940s.

== See also ==
- History of Ireland (1169–1536), when England invaded Ireland
- History of Ireland (1536–1691), when England conquered Ireland
- History of Ireland (1691–1801), the time of the Protestant Ascendency
- History of Ireland (1801–1923), when Ireland was merged with the Kingdom of Great Britain to form the United Kingdom
