= Murrisk Millennium Peace Park =

Public park in County Mayo, Ireland

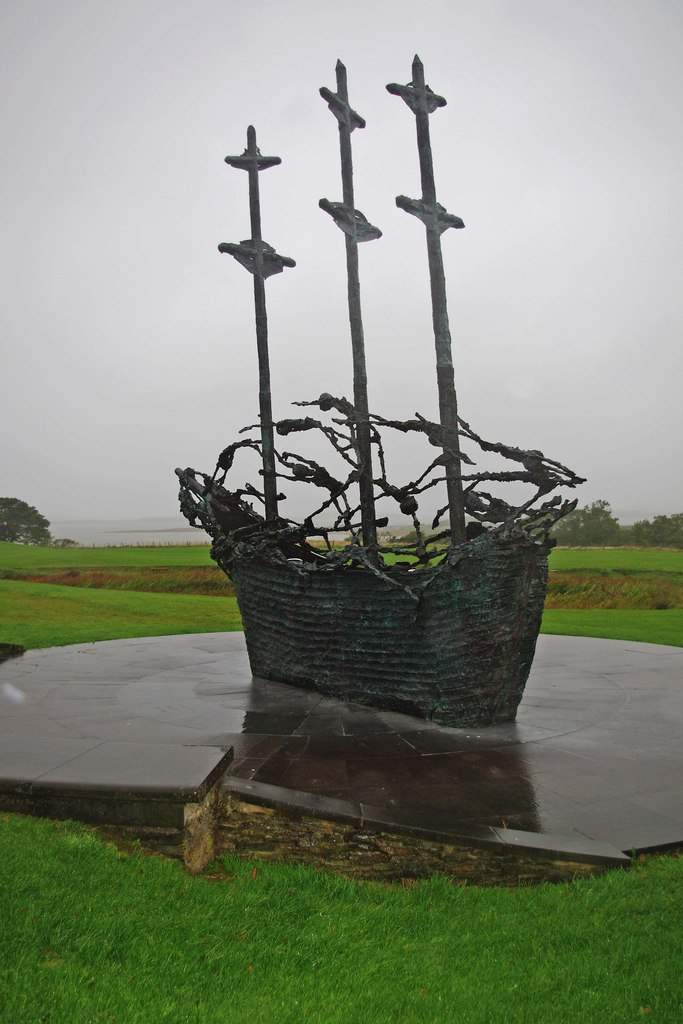
- The National Famine Memorial within the park
- Interactive map of Murrisk Millennium Peace Park
- Location: Murrisk, County Mayo, Ireland
- Coordinates: 53.7807°N 9.6405°W
- Area: 2.023 ha (5.00 acres)
- Created: 2001
- Operator: Mayo County Council
- Open: all year

The Murrisk Millennium Peace Park is a five-acre park located north of the R335 road overlooking the Atlantic Ocean in the village of Murrisk, County Mayo, Ireland at the foot of Croagh Patrick mountain.

The landscaping of the park was purposefully designed to be as unobtrusive as possible, allowing for clear views of neighbouring Croagh Patrick, Murrisk Abbey and Clew Bay. The minimal landscaping also serves to reinforce the stark visual impact of Ireland's National Famine Memorial, the Coffin Ship, a sculpture which stands prominently in the park. The unveiling of the memorial by President Mary Robinson on 20 July 1997 predated the opening of the Millennium Peace Park by some four years.

The park was officially opened on 13 July 2001 by Minister Seamus Brennan T.D., Chairman of the National Millennium Committee which had funded the creation of the park through an award of £250,000. On the park's official plaque it is stated that it was "dedicated to 2,000 years of Christian worship". During the opening ceremony a blessing was performed by the Rev. Michael Neary, Archbishop of Tuam and Rector Canon Gary Hastings. The park also serves to pay tribute to the spiritual importance of neighbouring Croagh Patrick, a site which has been a place of pilgrimage for over 1,500 years. The park lies across the road from the Croagh Patrick Visitor Centre car park and a short distance away from the ruins of Murrisk Abbey, founded in 1457 by the O'Malley family. A natural spring pond also exists within the park.

== National Famine Memorial ==
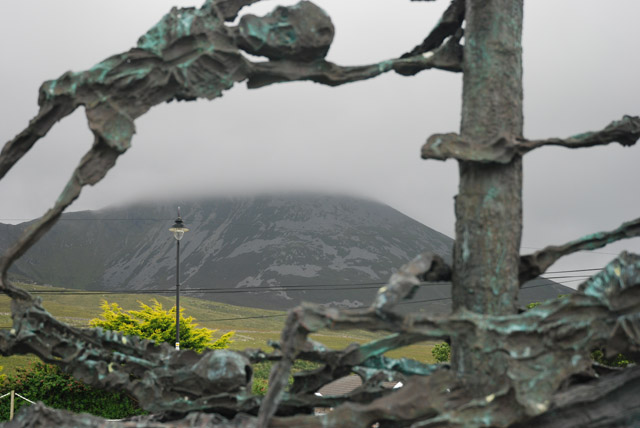
A view of Croagh Patrick through the monument

The National Famine Memorial (Irish: Cuimhneachán Náisiunta ar an nGorta Mór), designed by Irish artist John Behan, is Ireland's national memorial to the victims of the Great Irish Famine. It is a bronze sculpture measuring 30 foot long and 25 foot high. The memorial consists of a coffin ship with skeletons interwoven through the rigging, symbolising the many emigrants that did not survive the journey across the ocean in search of tenable living conditions. The ship is sited prominently in the park and commands panoramic views over Clew Bay.

=== History ===
In 1995 the Irish Government invited nominations for a suitable location for a National Famine Memorial to commemorate the event. Minister of State Avril Doyle T.D. was selected as Chairperson of the Government's Famine Commemoration Committee and met with members of the Murrisk Famine Memorial Committee in the village in November 1995 whilst looking at potential sites for the memorial. Murrisk was eventually chosen as the appropriate site as the committee felt that it was "...entirely fitting that the national famine memorial [..] be located in the west, which suffered most during the Famine with one in four of the population of Connaught dying in those terrible years." Murrisk is also situated close to the Doo Lough valley, which witnessed the famine-era Doolough Tragedy.

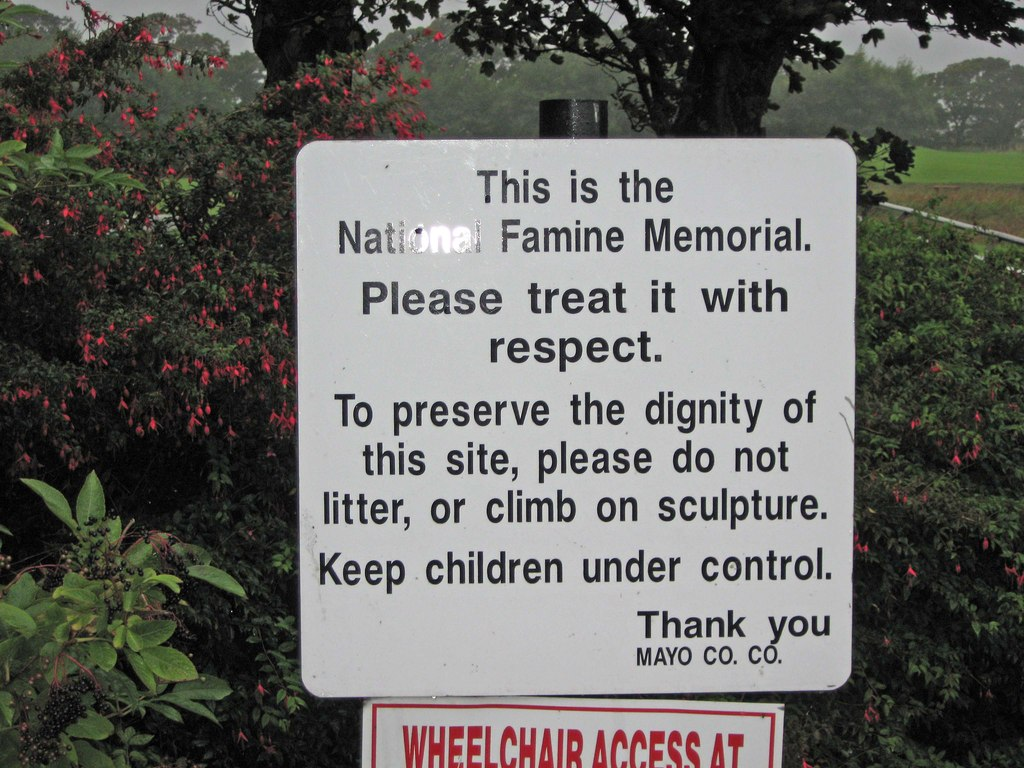
A sign at the entrance to the memorial

Artist John Behan was commissioned by the Government to create a sculpture that would encompass the magnitude of the suffering and loss endured by the people of Ireland during this time. The sculpture was the single largest casting in bronze ever carried out in Ireland and was managed by the Office of Public Works. The main body of the sculpture was lowered into place by crane in January 1997 and Behan began assembling the finer pieces shortly afterwards. The memorial was unveiled by Mary Robinson on 20 July 1997.

The site for the sculpture was provided by Mr. James Fair in honour of his parents Seamus and Brigid.

== Commemorations ==
Ceremonies honouring the victims of the famine on National Famine Memorial Day (16 May), have begun in the past with candle-lit vigils in the Murrisk Millennium Peace Park centring on the National Famine Memorial. In 2010, Minister for Community, Rural and Gaeltacht Affairs Pat Carey lead the official commemoration service with an address and wreath-laying ceremony, saying "No other event in our history can be likened to the Great Famine for its immediate impact or its legacy of emigration, cultural loss and decline of Irish language." Ceremonies are also held at the Garden of Remembrance, Dublin on the same day.

== See also ==
- Great Famine (Ireland)
- List of memorials to the Great Famine
- National Famine Museum, Strokestown, Co. Roscommon
