= Department of the Taoiseach =

Irish government department

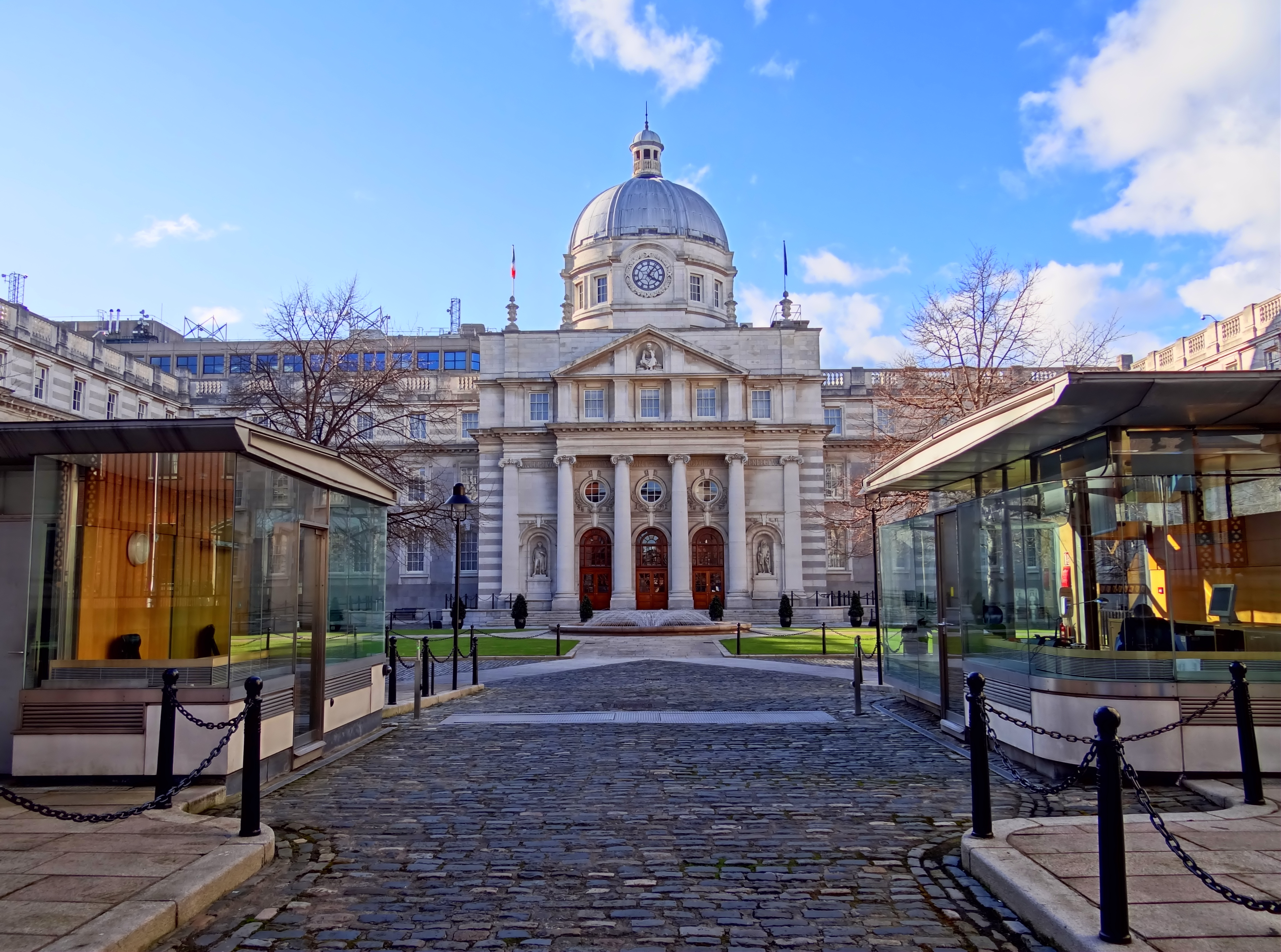
- Government Buildings, Dublin

Department overview
- Formed: 2 June 1924 (as the Department of President of the Executive Council of the Irish Free State)
- Jurisdiction: Government of Ireland
- Headquarters: Government Buildings, Merrion Street, Dublin; 53°20′12″N 6°15′34″W
- Annual budget: €260 million (2024)
- Minister responsible: Micheál Martin, Taoiseach
- Department executive: John Callinan, Secretary General
- Child Department: Central Statistics Office
- Website: Official website

The Department of the Taoiseach (Irish: Roinn an Taoisigh) is the government department of the Taoiseach, the title in Ireland for the head of government. It is based in Government Buildings, the headquarters of the Government of Ireland, on Merrion Street in Dublin.

The civil servant who heads the Department of the Taoiseach is known as the Secretary General of the Department and also serves as the cabinet secretary.

== Departmental team ==
- Taoiseach: Micheál Martin, TD
  - Government Chief Whip: Mary Butler, TD
- Secretary General of the Department: John Callinan

== Functions ==
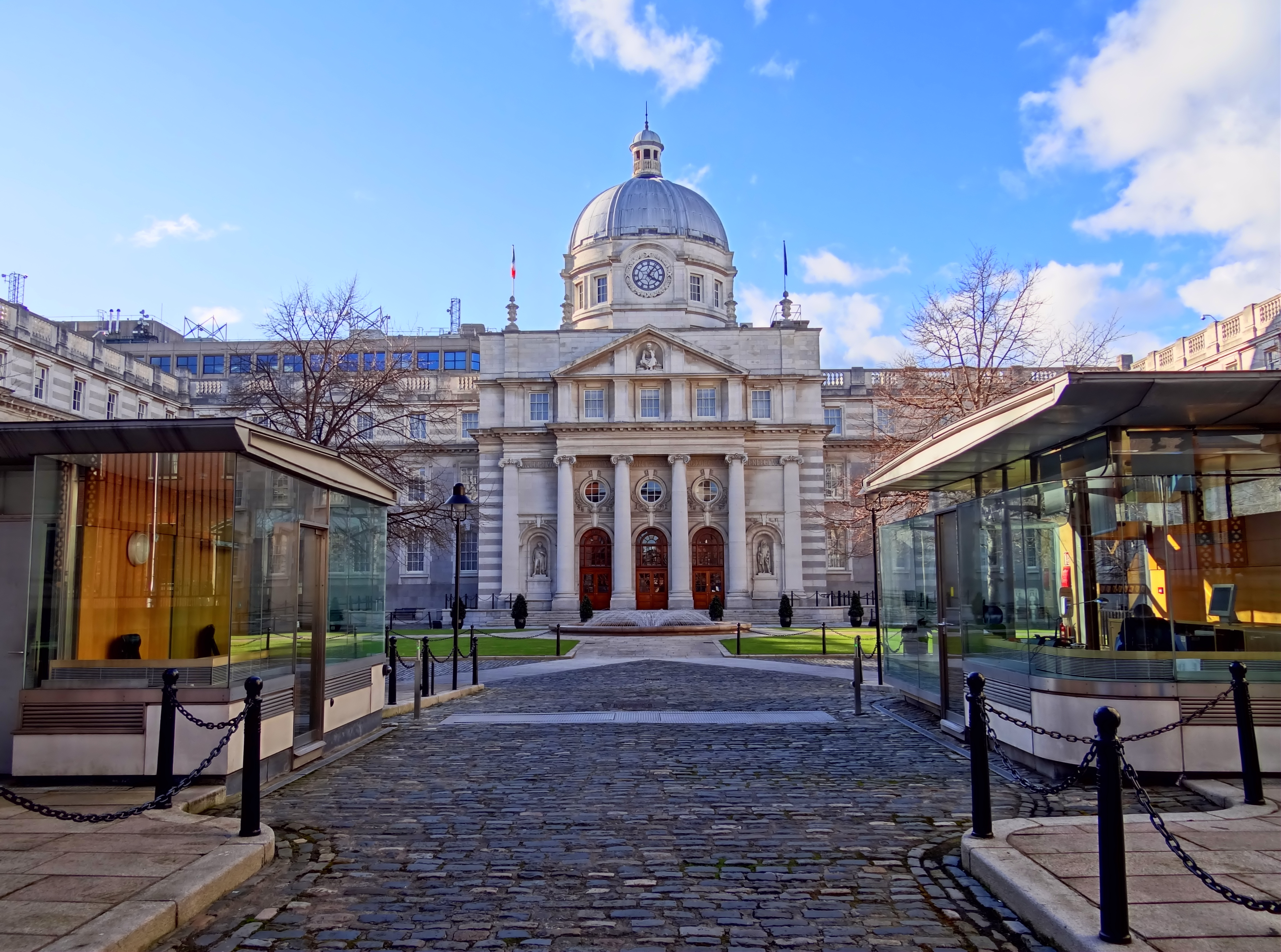
Government Buildings, Dublin, is the location of the Department of the Taoiseach

The main role of the department is to support and advise the Taoiseach in carrying out various duties. The department also supplies administrative support to the Government Chief Whip in respect of their duties and provides the Secretariat to the Government. The department acts as a link between the President, the Taoiseach and other Departments of state.

In addition, the Department of the Taoiseach is involved in a number of other areas such as the development and co-ordination of policy in relation to economic and social development (social partnership), Northern Ireland, the European Union and Oireachtas reform. It also arranges State functions such as the annual National Day of Commemoration, presidential inaugurations, State dinners and provides a protocol service to the Taoiseach of the day.

== History ==
Article 53 of the Constitution of the Irish Free State created the position of President of the Executive Council of the Irish Free State. The department was created by the Ministers and Secretaries Act 1924 as the Department of the President of the Executive Council, which came into operation on 2 June 1924. Under that act it was assigned:

the business, powers, authorities, duties and functions by the Constitution or by any existing or future Act of the Oireachtas or otherwise conferred on or to be discharged or performed by the Minister, who shall hold the office of and be styled Uachtarán na hArd-Chomhairle or (in English) the President of the Executive Council, and also the custody of and responsibility for all public archives and records and of papers and documents of State and of grants, deeds and other instruments of title relating to the property corporeal and incorporeal, real and personal for the time being vested in Saorstát Eireann and of records of the Executive Council and also the custody of the Seal of the Executive Council and also the responsibility for and control of the official publications of the Executive Council and also the administrative control of and responsibility for such public services and the business, powers, duties and functions thereof as may not for the time being be comprised in any of the Departments of State constituted by this Act.

The position of Taoiseach was created under Articles 13.1 and 28.5 of the Constitution of Ireland, which was approved on 1 July 1937. Under the Constitution (Consequential Provisions) Act 1937, the Department of the President of the Executive Council was renamed as the Department of the Taoiseach from and after the coming into operation of the Constitution of Ireland, which occurred on 29 December 1937.

The Department was for much of the time after its foundation no more than "a glorified private office" for the Taoiseach of the day, being likened to a post office, from which decisions, once made at cabinet would get distributed to the relevant departments for execution. It was greatly expanded after 1979 by successive Taoisigh, principally Charles Haughey and Garret FitzGerald.
