= Ballyhogue =

Village in County Wexford, Ireland

Coordinates: 52.4143°N 6.5752°W

Ballyhogue or Ballyhoge (Irish: Baile Uí Cheog) is a village and census town in County Wexford, Ireland. The village, which lies in a townland and civil parish of the same name, had a population of 255 people as of the 2022 census. It is 10 km south of Enniscorthy.

Evidence of ancient settlement in the area includes a number of ecclesiastical sites and the remains of a hillfort to the south of the village. Some sources associate the ruined church of St. John, and its nearby graveyard, with the Knights Hospitaller.

The local Roman Catholic church, Bellevue church, was built between 1858 and 1860. Depending on the sources, the designs of the church are attributed to either Augustus Pugin (1812–1852), his son Edward Welby Pugin (1834–1875), or architect James Joseph McCarthy (1817–1882).

Ballyhogue National School, also known as Scoil Mhuire National School, had an enrollment of 17 pupils as of 2024.

== See also ==
- Bree, County Wexford
- River Slaney
