= Mushet =

Mushet is a surname. Notable people with the surname include:

- David Mushet (1772–1847), Scottish engineer and metallurgist
- Robert Mushet (writer) (1782–1828), Scottish official of the Royal Mint, and writer on financial topics
- Robert Forester Mushet (1811–1891), British metallurgist and businessman
- Robert Mushet (cricketer) (1901–1992), Scottish cricketer
