= 1841 census of Ireland =

Irish census

Census of Ireland, 1841
← 1831	6 June 1841	1851 →
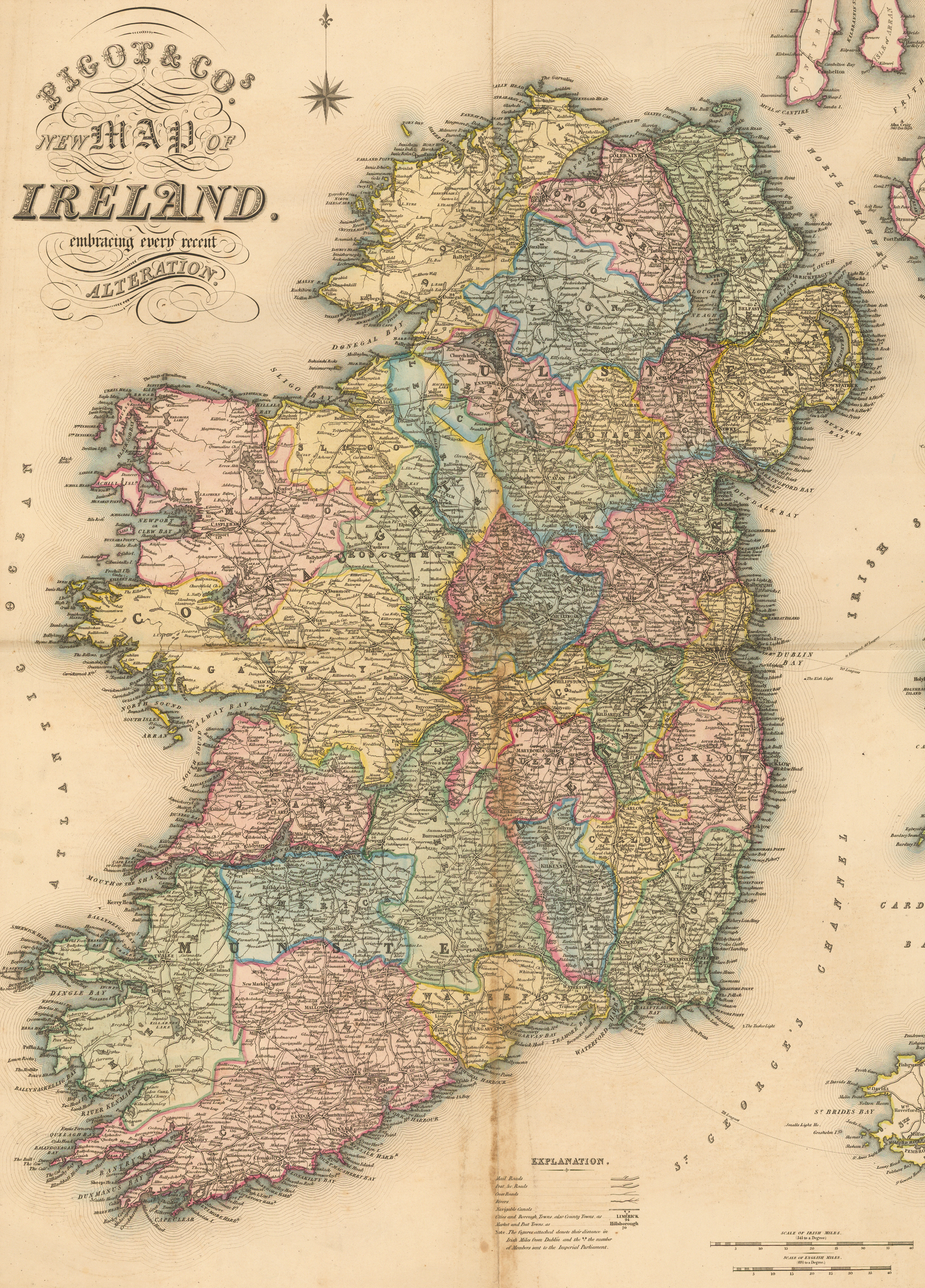
- Map of Ireland (1840)

General information
- Country: Ireland

Results
- Total population: 8,175,124 (▲5.25%)
- Most populous county: Cork (854,118)
- Least populous county: Carlow (86,228)

The 1841 Census of Ireland was a census that covered the whole island of Ireland. It was conducted as part of the broader 1841 United Kingdom census, which was the first modern census undertaken in the UK. The census is of particular note in Ireland as it was taken shortly before the Great Famine (1845–1852), which resulted in over 1 million deaths and spurred decades of mass emigration. The total population of the island in 1841 was estimated to be just under 8.2 million, which remains the highest recorded population Ireland has ever had. During this year, Ireland also held about 31% of the UK's population. As of the latest censuses – 2022 in the Republic of Ireland and 2021 in Northern Ireland – the island's population stood at just over 7 million, roughly 16% lower than its pre-famine peak.

The original records of the 1821 to 1851 censuses were destroyed by fire at the Four Courts in Dublin during the Irish Civil War, while those between 1861 and 1891 were possibly pulped during the First World War.

== Background ==
Due to the Population Act 1840, the United Kingdom Census of 1841 was conducted using a different framework from that of earlier United Kingdom censuses. The origins of the Population Act 1840 was the report of the 1830 Select Committee on the Population Bill, reprinted in 1840. The subject of much speculation during the select committee hearings and report was the accuracy of previous census returns, the first national census being held in 1801.

== Records ==
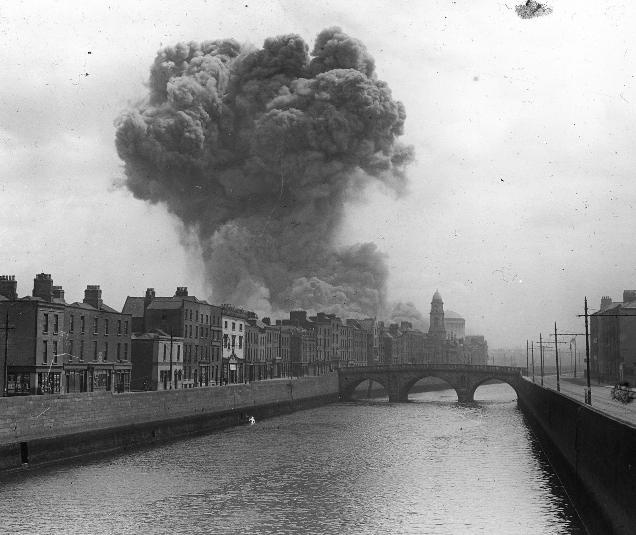
Most pre-1901 Irish census records were destroyed after an explosion at the Public Records Office in 1922

Very few census records for Ireland prior to 1901 survive due to the Irish Public Office being bombed on 30 June 1922. Some of the 1841 Census returns for Killeshandra of County Cavan, Kilcrohane of County Cork, Thurles of County Tipperary and Aghalurcher of County Fermanagh survived.

=== Results ===
In 1841 Cork was by far the island's most populous county, with approximately 850,000 residents - almost twice as populous as Galway in second place. Although its population steadily declined for decades following the famine, Cork would remain Ireland's most populous county until the 1901 census, when it was surpassed by Antrim. The least populous county was Carlow, which was also the sole county on the island with less than 100,000 residents. Carlow was consistently recorded as Ireland's least populous county until the 1956 census, when Longford dropped below it.

Dublin was the most urbanised county in Ireland and had a population density of 405 people per square km. It was the only county to record an overall increase in population between 1841 and 1851, while the cities of Cork and Belfast also saw their populations rise in the immediate aftermath of the famine. Partially owing to their mountainous terrain, counties Kerry, Donegal and Wicklow were the island's least densely populated regions.

=== Legacy ===
Just 8 of Ireland's 32 counties currently have a population above their recorded 1841 peak as of the latest censuses. Population estimates suggest that the total population of the island peaked in 1845 at around 8.5 million, and would likely have reached 9 million at the 1851 census were it not for the famine. The census recorded that the population of England, Scotland and Wales combined was just over twice that of Ireland, at 18.55 million. By comparison, 2020 estimates place the population of Great Britain at over nine times that of Ireland (65 million vs 6.9 million).

== Regional populations ==
A graph of the populations of Ireland and Europe showing the demographic consequences of the famine

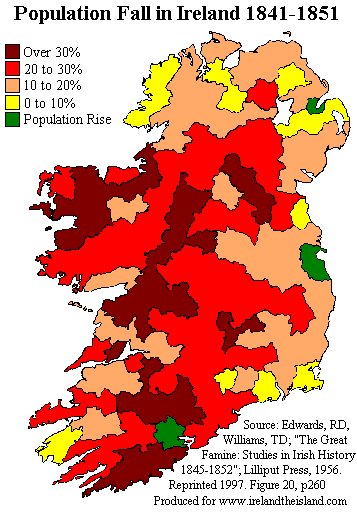
Population fall between 1841 and 1851

=== Province ===
Province	Flag	Irish name	Population (1841)	Density (km^{2})	Counties
Connaught	Connacht	Connachta; Cúige Chonnacht	1,418,859	80	5
Leinster	Leinster	Laighin; Cúige Laighean	1,973,731	100	12
Munster	Munster	Mumhain; Cúige Mumhan	2,396,161	97	6
Ulster	Ulster	Ulaidh; Cúige Uladh	2,386,373	108	9

=== County ===
Rank	County	Population	Density (km^{2})	Province	Change since 1841 (Note: The population change since 1841 for the 26 counties of the Republic of Ireland is the % change in relation to the 2022 census results. The population change since 1841 for the 6 counties of the Northern Ireland is the % change in relation to the 2021 census results.)
1	Cork	854,118	115	Munster	-32%
2	Galway	440,198	72	Connaught	-37%
3	Tipperary	435,553	101	Munster	-62%
4	Mayo	388,887	70	Connaught	-65%
5	Dublin	372,773	405	Leinster	291%
6	Down	361,446	145	Ulster	53%
7	Antrim	360,875	125	Ulster	80%
8	Limerick	330,029	123	Munster	-38%
9	Tyrone	312,956	99	Ulster	-40%
10	Donegal	296,448	61	Ulster	-44%
11	Kerry	293,880	62	Munster	-47%
12	Clare	286,394	91	Munster	-56%
13	Roscommon	253,591	100	Connaught	-72%
14	Cavan	243,158	126	Ulster	-67%
15	Armagh	232,393	185	Ulster	-16%
16	Londonderry	222,174	107	Ulster	14%
17	Kilkenny	202,420	98	Leinster	-49%
18	Wexford	202,033	86	Leinster	-19%
19	Monaghan	200,442	155	Ulster	-68%
20	Waterford	196,187	105	Munster	-35%
21	Meath	183,828	78	Leinster	20%
22	Sligo	180,886	98	Connaught	-61%
23	Fermanagh	156,481	93	Ulster	-59%
24	Leitrim	155,297	98	Connaught	-77%
25	Queen's	153,930	90	Leinster	-40%
26	King's	146,857	73	Leinster	-44%
27	Westmeath	141,300	77	Leinster	-32%
28	Louth	128,240	156	Leinster	8%
29	Wicklow	126,143	62	Leinster	23%
30	Longford	115,491	106	Leinster	-60%
31	Kildare	114,488	68	Leinster	116%
32	Carlow	86,228	96	Leinster	-28%
Total	Ireland	8,175,124	97		
	Average	255,473			

== Sources ==
- Report of the Commissioners Appointed to Take the Census of Ireland, for the Year 1841. A. Thom. 1843.

== Bibliography ==
- Woodham-Smith, Cecil (1991) [1962], The Great Hunger: Ireland 1845–1849, Penguin, ISBN 978-0-14-014515-1
