= Robert Mushet =

Robert Mushet may refer to:

- Robert Mushet (writer) (1782–1828), Scottish official of the Royal Mint and writer on financial topics
- Robert Forester Mushet (1811–1891), British metallurgist and businessman
- Robert Mushet (cricketer) (1901–1992), Scottish cricketer
