= Real bills doctrine =

Doctrine in monetary economics

The real bills doctrine says that as long as bankers lend to businessmen only against the security (collateral) of short-term 30-, 60-, or 90-day commercial paper representing claims to real goods in the process of production, the loans will be just sufficient to finance the production of goods. The doctrine seeks to have real output determine its own means of purchase without affecting prices. Under the real bills doctrine, there is only one policy role for the central bank: lending commercial banks the necessary reserves against real customer bills, which the banks offer as collateral. The term "real bills doctrine" was coined by Lloyd Mints in his 1945 book, A History of Banking Theory. The doctrine was previously known as "the commercial loan theory of banking".

Moreover, as bank loans are granted to businessmen in the form either of new bank notes or of additions to their checking deposits, which deposits constitute the main component of the money stock, the doctrine assures that the volume of money created will be just enough to allow purchasers to buy the finished goods off the market as final product without affecting prices. From their sales receipts, businessmen then pay off their real bills bank loans. Banks retire the returned money from circulation until the next batch of goods need financing.

The doctrine has roots in some statements of Adam Smith. John Law (1671–1729) in his Money and Trade Considered: With a Proposal for Supplying a Nation with Money (1705) originated the basic idea of the real bills doctrine, the concept of an "output-governed currency secured to real property and responding to the needs of trade". Law sought to limit monetary expansion and maintain price stability, by using land as a measure of, and collateral for, real activity. Smith then substituted short-term self-liquidating commercial paper for Law's production proxy, land, and so the real bills doctrine was born.

The British banker, parliamentarian, philanthropist, anti-slavery activist, and monetary theorist Henry Thornton (1760–1815) was an early critic of the real bills doctrine. He noted one of the doctrine's three main flaws, namely that by linking money not to real output as the original intention was, but to the price times quantity—or nominal dollar value—of real output, it set up a positive feedback loop running from price to money to price. When the monetary authority holds the market (loan) rate of interest, below the profit rate on capital, this feedback loop can generate continuing inflation.

Doctrinal historians have noted the real bills doctrine's place as one factor contributing to the instability of the U.S. money supply precipitating the Great Depression. Adhering to the doctrine's second flaw, namely that speculative activity/paper can be sharply distinguished from purely productive activity/paper (as if production motivated by uncertain expected future profits does not involve a speculative element), long-time Fed Board member Adolph C. Miller in 1929 launched his Direct Pressure initiative. It required all member banks seeking Federal Reserve discount window assistance to affirm that they had never made speculative loans, especially of the stock-market variety. No self-respecting banker seeking to borrow emergency reserves from the Fed was willing to undergo such interrogation, especially given that a "hard-boiled" Federal Reserve was unlikely to grant such aid. Instead, the banks chose to fail (and the Federal Reserve let them), which they did in large numbers, almost 9000 of them. These failures led to the 1/3 contraction of the money stock, which, according to Friedman and Schwartz, caused the Great Depression. The result was a decade-long fall of real output and prices, which by the needs-of-trade logic of the real bills doctrine justified shrinkage of the money stock.

Here was the doctrine's third flaw. It calls for pro-cyclical contractions and expansions of the money stock when correct stabilization policy calls for counter-cyclical ones. The doctrine fell into disuse in the late 1930s, but its legacy still influences banking policy from time to time.

== Commercial bank clearinghouse system ==
In 1988, economist James Parthemos, a former senior vice president and director of research at the Federal Reserve Bank of Richmond, wrote for the bank's Economic Quarterly, "This so-called commercial loan theory or real bills doctrine was a basic principle underlying the money functions of the new system. The essential fallacy in the doctrine was that note issue would also vary with the price level as well as the real volume of trade. Thus its operation would be inherently inflationary or deflationary." Milton Friedman and Anna J.Schwartz held that opinion but did not discuss its full implications in their book published in 1963, A Monetary History of the United States, 1867–1960.

== The gold standard ==
According to Richard Timberlake, the gold standard did not create the Great Depression. Today the gold standard remains a popular scapegoat for "the Great Contraction" – the unprecedented collapse of the U.S. money supply, which began after the 1929 stock market crash and led to the Great Depression. Skeptics of this hypothesis cite other monetary crises – like the German hyperinflation and the Mississippi Bubble – to their true source: the real bills doctrine. By drawing a false dichotomy between "productive activity" and "speculative activity", Humphrey and Timberlake argue, the Doctrine wrongfully impugned speculation as the source of asset price bubbles and financial panic. Such flawed premises made the Fed unduly reluctant to make full use of the United States' ample gold reserves.

== Financial panic of 1929 ==
Winfield W. Riefler was an American statistician and economist who was instrumental in bringing about the Treasury-Fed Accord of 1951. Riefler served as an assistant to the chairman of the Federal Reserve Board of Governors from 1948 to 1959. His Riefler-Burgess framework was in opposition to the real bills doctrine's use as a guiding philosophy of U.S. monetary policy in the 1930s.

== Federal Reserve Bank ==
In 1982, Thomas Humphrey wrote,

"With recession lingering and interest rates remaining high, one hears increasingly that the Fed should abandon its money growth targets and move to a policy of lowering interest rates to full employment levels. All would be well, we are told, if only the Fed would set a fixed low interest rate target consistent with full employment and then let the money stock adjust to money demand to achieve that desired target rate. In effect, this means that the Fed would relinquish control over the money stock, letting it expand as required in a vain effort to eliminate discrepancies between the market rate and the predetermined target rate. This low target interest rate proposal has much in common with the long-discredited real bills doctrine, according to which the money supply should expand passively to accommodate the legitimate needs of trade".

Thomas Humphrey and Richard Timberlake in their 2019 book, Gold, the Real Bills Doctrine, and the Fed: Sources of Monetary Disorder 1922–1938, discussed the real bills doctrine (RBD) and the chief personnel involved in its failure. They identified Adolph C. Miller (1866–1953), long-term member of the Federal Reserve Board of Governors as the person most responsible. Under the influence of the RBD, Miller launched his "Direct Pressure" initiative in late 1929. That initiative, a letter sent out to all member banks of the Federal Reserve System, led to the wave of bank failures. Nine-thousand banks failed, and their failure resulted in the 1/3 contraction of the money stock which precipitated the Great Depression. The "Direct Pressure" letter required any commercial bank seeking to avail itself of Fed lender-of-last-resort assistance to show, beyond a shadow of a doubt, that it had never even thought of making "speculative" loans, particularly of the stock-market variety. Few bankers wished to expose themselves to such withering interrogation. To avoid such questioning, bankers refrained from applying for Federal Reserve emergency liquidity aid even though they needed it. This was especially so in the panicky situation of the October 1929 crash when bank depositors were seeking to cash in their checking deposits and take the cash from the banks. Instead of borrowing the reserves needed to meet the cash drain from the Fed and exposing themselves to "Direct Pressure" questioning, those banks failed in huge numbers. Humphrey and Timberlake assert that a real bills doctrine is essentially a "metastable mechanism", since it is "beyond" stable. They contend that the doctrine itself "does not imply either a stable or an unstable system", but that "it depends completely on the institutional environment in which the doctrine appears".

Clark Warburton, an early-pre-Friedman-and-Schwartz monetarist who wrote in the 1940s, 1950s, and early-1960s at a time when most other economists were Keynesians, worked for the FDIC and was the only economist Timberlake and Humphrey could find who, other than themselves, identified the Direct Pressure initiative as a major cause, if not the cause, of the Great Depression. However, Warburton did not single out Adolph Miller as Direct Pressure's principal formulator, as Humphrey and Timberlake have.

Economists Thomas J. Sargent and Neil Wallace published "The Real-Bills Doctrine Versus The Quantity Theory: A Reconsideration" for the Journal of Political Economy in 1982. They contended that "Two competing monetary policy prescriptions are analyzed within the context of overlapping generations models" and that "the real-bills prescription is for unfettered private intermediation or central bank operations designed to produce the effects of such intermediation. The quantity-theory prescription, in contrast, is for restrictions on private intermediation designed to separate 'money' from credit. Although our models are consistent with quantity-theory predictions about money supply and price-level behavior under these two policy prescriptions, the models imply that the quantity-theory prescription is not Pareto optimal and the real-bills prescription is." Monetary historian David Laidler has observed that Sargent and Wallace's version of the real bills doctrine is not the same as the one prevailing in the 19th and early 20th centuries.

Federal Reserve Bank of Richmond economist Robert Hetzel wrote:

The founders of the Federal Reserve desired to end financial panics. In order to achieve this end, they created a decentralized collection of reserve depositories – the Federal Reserve banks. They also wanted to remove control of the financial system from Wall Street. At the time, policymakers understood financial panics as resulting from speculative excess, especially on Wall Street. These "real bills" views of financial panic originated in the 19th century American experience. They influenced monetary policy significantly until the post-World War II period.

== Real bills doctrine in the 21st century ==
Australian Professor Emeritus Roy Green, a Special Advisor and Chair for UTS Innovation Council at the University of Technology Sydney, wrote in 1927 that "The 'real bills doctrine' has its origin in banking developments of the 17th and 18th centuries. It received its first authoritative exposition in Adam Smith's Wealth of Nations, was then repudiated by Thornton and Ricardo in the famous bullionist controversy, and was finally rehabilitated as the 'law of reflux' by Tooke and Fullarton in the currency-banking debate of the mid–19th century. Even now, echoes of the real bills doctrine reverberate in modern monetary theory." Green's description of the real bills doctrine was later repeated in Semantic Scholar, an artificial intelligence-backed search engine for academic publications begun in 2015. Green wrote the article entry about the "Real Bills Doctrine in Classical Economics" published in The New Palgrave in 2018.

In 2018, Parintha Sastry's article "The Political Origins of Section 13(3) of the Federal Reserve Act" was published in the New York Federal Reserve's Economic Policy Review. In this article Sastry discussed the role of the real bills doctrine in the 2008 financial crisis:

At the height of the financial crisis of 2007–09, the Federal Reserve conducted emergency lending under authority granted to it in the third paragraph of Section 13 of the Federal Reserve Act. This article explores the political and legislative origins of the section, focusing on why Congress chose to endow the central bank with such an authority. The author describes how in the initial passage of the act in 1913, Congress demonstrated its steadfast commitment to the "real bills" doctrine in two interrelated ways: 1) by limiting what assets the Fed could purchase, discount, and use as collateral for advances, and 2) by ensuring that any newly created government-sponsored credit enterprises were kept separate from the Federal Reserve System. During the Great Depression, however, Congress passed legislation that blurred the line between monetary and credit policy, slowly chipping away at the real bills doctrine as it sought to combat the crisis. It was in this context that Congress added Section 13(3) to the Federal Reserve Act. In tracing this history, the author concludes that the original framers of Section 13(3) meant to sanction direct Federal Reserve lending to the real economy, rather than simply to a weakened financial sector, in emergency circumstances. This Depression-era history provides insights into the evolving role of the Federal Reserve as an emergency provider of liquidity.

Since cryptocurrency systems do not require a central authority such as the Federal Reserve Bank or the World Bank, and their state is maintained through distributed consensus, the concept of the real bills doctrine may have no obvious impact on their use. There have reportedly been money supply problems with Diem digital currency (formerly known as Libra), a commissioned blockchain which was proposed by the American social media company Facebook, Inc.
