= James Deacon Hume =

English official, economic writer and advocate of free trade

James Deacon Hume (1774 – 1842) was an English official, an economic writer and advocate of free trade.

== Life ==
The son of James Hume, a commissioner and afterwards secretary of the customs, he was born at Newington, Surrey, on 28 April 1774, and educated at Westminster School. In 1791 he became an indoor clerk in the custom house in Thames Street, London.

A report which Hume wrote for the commissioners attracted the notice of William Huskisson, and he was appointed as controller of the customs. In 1822 he brought up the idea of consolidating the laws of the customs, and at the end of the year the Treasury excused him from ordinary duties for three years to pursue the work. The customs laws dated from the reign of Edward I of England and comprised 1500 statutes. Hume reduced them to ten: these ten Acts of Parliament received the royal assent in July 1825. Hume edited them with notes and indices. He was rewarded for his labour by a public grant of £6,000, which he then lost by a bad investment.

Hume was, in 1828, appointed joint secretary of the Board of Trade, and became assistant to Huskisson. From Hume had been employed on preparing a parliamentary bill regulating the silk duties. In 1831 he made an official tour through England, collecting information about silk manufacture, and in March 1832 he gave evidence before a committee of the House of Commons on the silk duties. He gave further evidence before another committee in 1840, and expressed a strong opinion against protective duties. He assisted Thomas Tooke in establishing the Political Economy Club, and from its founding in 1821 until 1841 attended its meetings regularly, and spoke repeatedly on free trade. The Customs' Benevolent Fund, originated in 1816 by Charles Ogilvy, was carried out by Hume, who was the first president. He advocated life assurance, and was one of the founders of the Atlas Assurance Company in 1808, and its deputy chairman to his death. In June 1835 he gave evidence before a committee on the timber duties, which were gradually reduced.

Hume was associated as trustee of some private property with Henry Fauntleroy, and in September 1824 found that Fauntleroy had forged his name to a letter of attorney by which £10,000 had been abstracted from the estate. The trial and execution of Fauntleroy followed

Hume retired from the Board of Trade in 1840, and went to live at Reigate. He received a pension of £1,500 a year. In the same year he gave evidence on the corn laws and on the duties on coffee, tea, and sugar, and his opinions in favour of the abolition of these duties quoted by Sir Robert Peel and other politicians.

Hume lost his savings by poor investments. He died of apoplexy at Great Doods House, Reigate, on 12 January 1842, and was buried in Reigate churchyard. His death was mentioned by Peel on 9 February in the House of Commons.

== Works ==
Hume was the author of:

- Thoughts on the Corn Laws, as connected with Agriculture, Commerce, and Finance, 1815.
- The Laws of the Customs, 6 Geo. IV, c. 106-16, with notes, 1825–32, six parts.
- The Laws of the Customs, 3 & 4 Gul. IV, c. 50-60, with notes, 1833–6, three parts.
- Letters on the Corn Laws, by H. B. T., 1834; another edit., 1835.
- Corn Laws. The Evidence of J. D. Hume on the Import Duties in 1839, 1842.

In 1833-4 Hume sent seven letters to the Morning Post entitled Rights of the Working Classes. They were reprinted at the request of Sir Benjamin Hawes, and reached a second edition.

== Family ==
Hume married, on 4 June 1798, Frances Elizabeth, widow of Charles Ashwell of Grenada, and daughter of Edward Whitehouse of the custom house and a gentleman usher at the Court of St. James's. She died at East Bergholt, Suffolk, on 31 May 1854, leaving twelve children by Hume.
