= Political Economy Club =

UK-based economics association

The Political Economy Club is the world's oldest economics association that was founded by James Mill. It was founded in 1821 in London with David Ricardo, Thomas Malthus, and Robert Torrens, because there were not any professional associations for free trade economists to peer-review their work. Despite Mill's exclusive limit to 30 members: the Political Economy Club was a predominant influence on 19th century economics.

== History ==
On 18 April 1821, Swinton Holand held at his house the first meeting of the Club. A second larger meeting was held at Freemasons' Tavern, London, on 30 April. The club now meets monthly at Brooks's Club to hear the members' papers and dine. The founding participants' disagreement on the formulation of their fundamental axioms provoked Ricardo to privately express his infamous assertion of the 'non-existence of any measure of absolute value'. There were subsequently founded the less exclusive Section F of the BAAS (founded 1832), and the Statistical Society of London (founded 1834), and the Cobden Club (founded 1866), and the British Economic Association (founded 1890).

=== Notable members include ===
David Ricardo, Thomas Malthus, James Mill, Colonel Thomas Moody, Kt., Robert Torrens, Thomas Tooke, John Stuart Mill, John Ramsey McCulloch, Nassau Senior, John Elliott Cairnes, Henry Fawcett, William Newmarch, Samuel Jones-Loyd, 1st Baron Overstone, Jane Marcet, George Warde Norman, William Blake, Walter Coulson, George Pryme, George R. Porter, William T. Thornton, Walter Bagehot, and Jean-Baptiste Say.

Later: William Stanley Jevons, Thomas Edward Cliffe Leslie, Walter Coulson, Robert Mushet, Henry Parnell, James Pennington, John Horsley Palmer, and Thomas Perronet Thompson. Others were drawn from outside the ranks of economists, including G. G. de Larpent, George John Shaw-Lefevre, John Abel Smith, Henry Warburton, Lord Althorp, William Whitmore, W. B. Baring, Poulett Thomson, Sir Robert Wilmot-Horton, Lord Monteagle, Charles Hay Cameron, James Deacon Hume, George Grote, James Morrison, Edwin Chadwick, Sir Robert Giffen, Charles Buller, and Sir William Clay.

Significant elections after 1840 include Robert Lowe, Sir G. C. Lewis, Rowland Hill, Stafford Northcote, George J. Goschen, William Ewart Gladstone, and W. E. Forster.

=== Current members include ===
- Lord Willetts
- Sir Adam Ridley
- Tim Congdon CBE
- Peter Jay
- Charles Dumas
- Diana Choyleva
- Gabriel Stein
- Maya Bhandari

=== Honorary members ex officio: (limited to six from the following list) ===
- Drummond Professor of Political Economy of Oxford
- Professor of Political Economy (Cambridge)
- Whately Chair of Political Economy of Trinity College, Dublin
- Tooke Professor of King's College, London
- Professor of Political Economy of University College London
- Cobden Professor of Owens College, Manchester
- Professors in political economy at Queen's Colleges of Ireland (Belfast, Cork, Galway), and
- Professors of the universities of Scotland (Edinburgh, Glasgow, Aberdeen, St. Andrews)

=== The 19 founding members of the Political Economy Club (1821) ===
- George Basevi
- George Brown, Governor of Bombay
- I. Cazenove
- John Welsford Cowell
- William Keith Douglas
- Henry Entwistle
- George Grote MP
- Swinton C. Holland
- Sir G.G. de H. Larpent Bart.
- Sir J.G.S. Lefevre KCB
- George Lyall MP
- Colonel W.L. Maberly
- Zachary Macaulay
- I.L. Malthus
- Rev. Thomas Robert Malthus
- James Mill
- F. Mitchell
- Robert Mushet
- George Wade Norman
- Sir Henry Parnell MP
- Alexander Prevost
- Charles Prinsep
- David Ricardo
- Edward Simson
- R. Simpson
- John Abel Smith MP
- Thomas Tooke
- Colonel Robert Torrens
- Henry Warburton MP

== Bicentenary Essay Competition ==
To celebrate the PEC's bicentennial, an open international essay competition was announced in 2020 for the 2021 year. Candidates were asked to choose one of two titles. These were:

1. "How relevant are the ideas of Malthus and Ricardo respectively to today’s issues of climate change (is this an example of Malthusian limits?) and of limits to markets (is globalisation with free trade and free capital movements an unmixed blessing?)?"
2. "With UK real income per head up 15 times over the past 200 years and more evenly distributed, will this be repeated over the next 200 years? – and if not, why not?"

== See also ==
- American Economic Association

== Archives ==
- Political Economy Club papers at the Archives Division of the London School of Economics.

== Publications ==
- J. R. McCulloch, Early English Tracts on Commerce. London: Political Economy Club (1856); Cambridge University Press, 1954.
- Political Economy Club, Revised Report of the Proceedings at the Dinner of 31 May 1876, Held in Celebration of the Hundredth Year of the Publication of the “Wealth of Nations” London: Longmans, Green, Reader & Dyer (1876).
- Political Economy Club : founded in London, 1821 : minutes of proceedings, 1899–1920, roll of members and questions discussed, 1821–1920 with documents bearing on the history of the club. Macmillan and Co., (1921)
