= Otto Niemeyer =

British banker and civil servant

Sir Otto Niemeyer GBE KCB
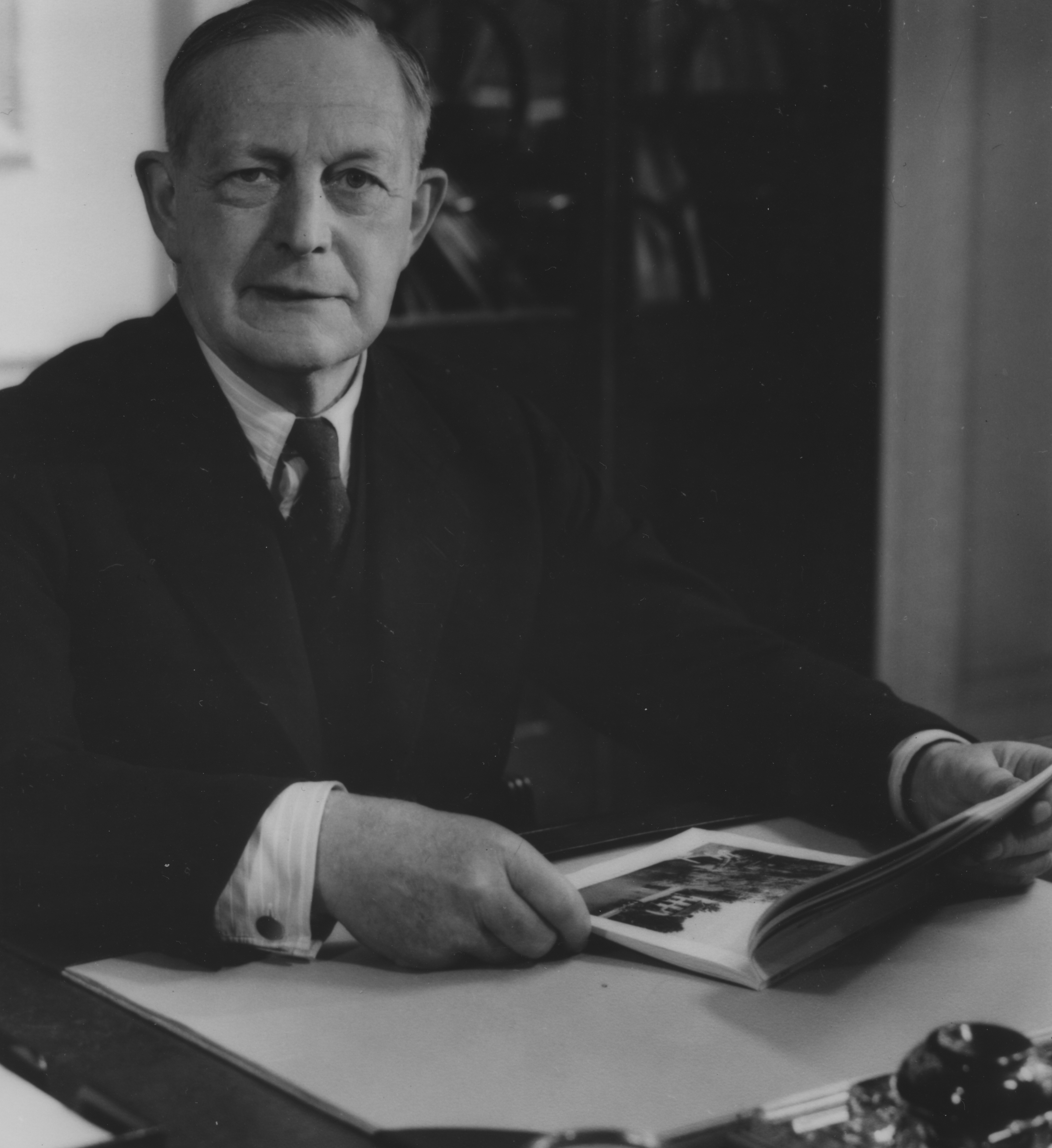
- Born: 23 November 1883; Streatham, London, England
- Died: 6 February 1971 (aged 87); Lindfield, Sussex, England
- Education: Balliol College, Oxford
- Occupation: Banker
- Known for: Director of the Bank of England (1938–1952)
- Spouse: Sophie Niemeyer (m. 1910)
- Children: 4

Sir Otto Ernst Niemeyer (23 November 1883 – 6 February 1971) was a British banker and civil servant. He served as a director of the Bank of England from 1938 to 1952 and a director of the Bank for International Settlements from 1931 to 1965.

An Oxford graduate, Niemeyer began working for HM Treasury in 1906 and rose rapidly through the ranks, finishing his time there as controller of finance (1922–1927). He was recruited to the Bank of England by Montagu Norman, and represented the bank at the League of Nations and on a number of missions overseas. His visit to Australia in 1930 contributed to a political crisis that resulted in the Australian Labor Party split of 1931 and the collapse of James Scullin's government.

== Personal life ==
Niemeyer was born in Streatham, London, the eldest of three children born to Ethel (née Rayner) and Ernst August Wilhelm Niemeyer. His mother was English. His father, originally from Hanover, Germany, arrived in Britain in 1870 and became a naturalised subject. Niemeyer attended St Paul's School, London before going on to Balliol College, Oxford. He married a distant cousin, Sophie Niemeyer, in 1910, and they had four children together. He retired to Lindfield, Sussex, dying there in 1971 at the age of 87.

== Career ==
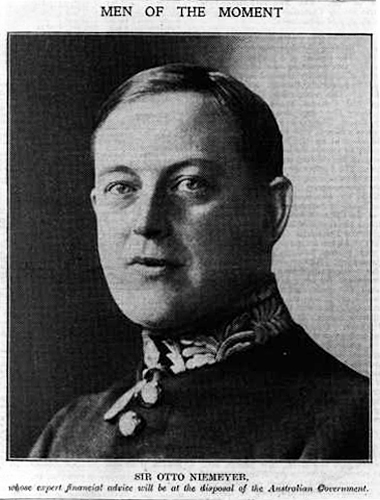
Niemeyer c. 1927

=== Treasury ===
Niemeyer joined HM Treasury in 1906. He rose rapidly through the ranks, becoming deputy controller of finance in 1920 and controller of finance in 1922, succeeding Basil Blackett. He held that position until 1927, serving as the chief adviser to the Chancellor of the Exchequer on financial matters. He took Blackett's place on the financial committee of the League of Nations. According to Frederick Leith-Ross, Niemeyer was "the outstanding Treasury official of the post-war years". His advice was instrumental in the introduction of the British Gold Standard Act 1925, which saw the country return to the gold standard. He left the Treasury at the age of 44, feeling he could advance no further within the department.

=== Bank of England ===
Niemeyer was recruited to the Bank of England in 1927 by Montagu Norman, as an adviser to the governor. He represented the bank on the financial committee of the League of Nations until 1937 and on the Corporation of Foreign Bondholders from 1935 to 1965, including as vice-president from 1950 to 1955 and president from 1955 to 1965. In November 1938 had, after discussions with the President of the German Reichsbank, Hjalmar Schacht, Niemeyer put forward a proposal linking Jewish emigration from Germany which would enable Jews to transfer their government bonds to foreign countries. Niemeyer was elected an executive director of the bank in 1938, alongside Cameron Cobbold, and was briefly mooted as successor to Norman in 1944; his candidacy was vetoed by Winston Churchill. He often filled a sort of diplomatic role for the bank, touring a number of different countries in order to provide advice to foreign governments and check up on the bank's debtors. In this capacity he toured Australia and New Zealand (1930), Brazil (1931), Argentina (1933), India (1936), and China (1941).

==== Advice to Australia ====
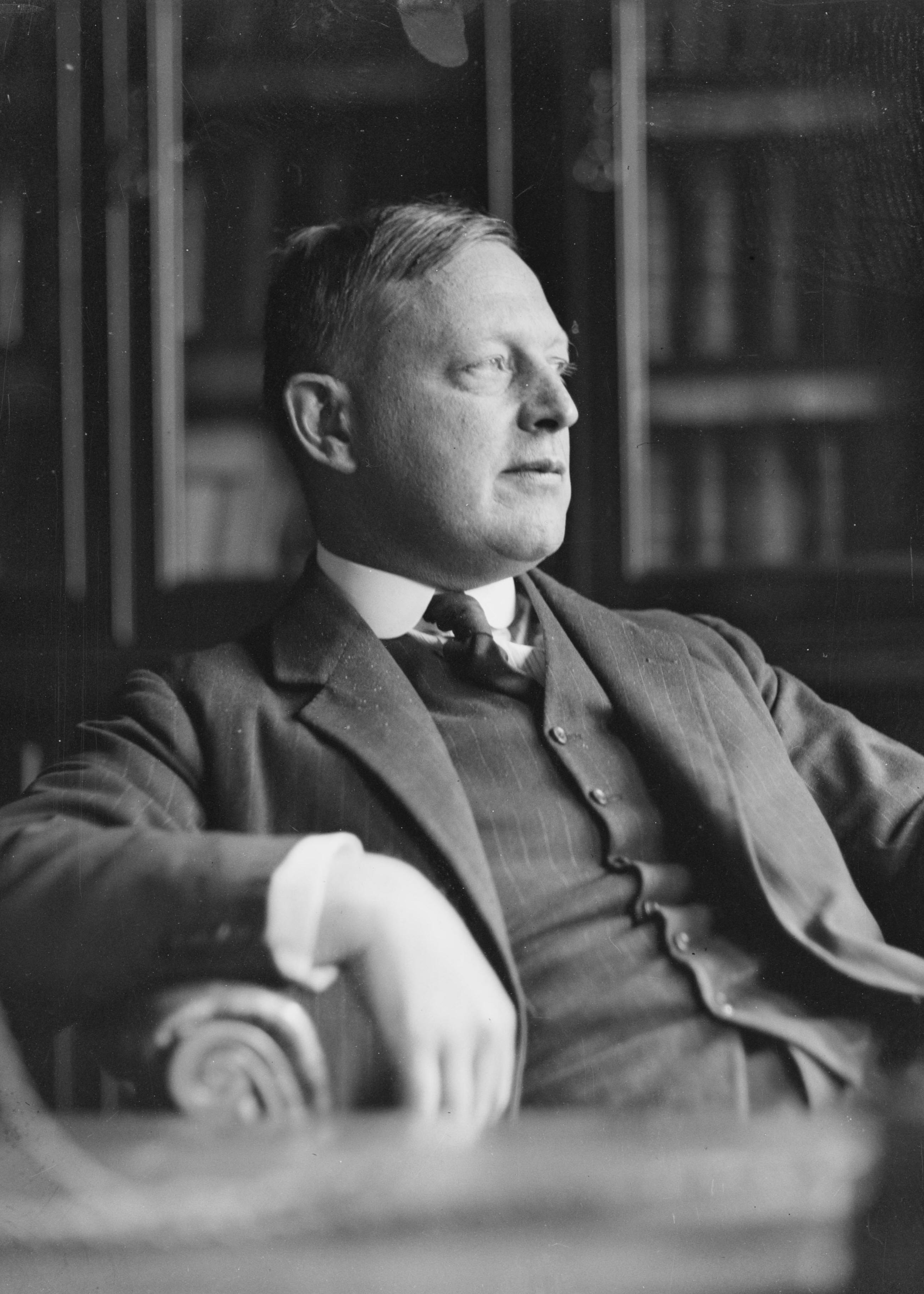
Niemeyer in Australia in 1930

Australia had accrued substantial debt, mainly from Britain's independent banking sector, by the late 1920s – partly as a result of Prime Minister Stanley Bruce's "Men, Money, Markets" economic strategy, and partly because of the large war debt established during World War I. After the Wall Street crash, the United States called in many of its World War I loans, including many from the UK, which, in turn called in its own loans from Australia. Australia had accumulated such massive debt that it was unable to repay even the interest on its loans. To avert total bankruptcy with the onset of the Australia's Great Depression, Australia asked Britain for a deferment of payment on its war debts. To determine whether or not this was a viable financial option, the Bank of England sent Niemeyer to give an assessment of Australia and its financial situation. He came by arrangement with the Commonwealth Bank and agreement by Prime Minister James Scullin, who hoped to use Niemeyer's advice as an affirmation of his government's financial policy.

Scullin announced the visit in Parliament on 19 June 1930:

"The Commonwealth representative in London has for some time been in close consultation with the Bank of England and other financial authorities with a view to finding a solution of the growing difficulties of providing exchange to cover Australian payments oversea. At the same time the Australian Loan Council has been in close consultation on the same subject with the Commonwealth Bank and the associated banks in Australia. The Government and the banks have already taken important corrective measures for adjusting the trade balance, and the banks have materially assisted the Australian governments to secure exchange on London. The Commonwealth Government is determined that the necessary steps shall be taken to meet promptly all Australian oversea obligations, and as the Bank of England has expressed its willingness to assist Australia to find a solution of its present difficulties the Government and the Bank have mutually agreed that there should be consultation in Australia between a representative of the Bank of England, the Commonwealth Government and the Commonwealth Bank Board. A representative of the Bank of England, Sir Otto Niemeyer, will accordingly visit Australia. He left London yesterday accompanied by an economist and an officer of the Bank of England."

Economic historian Alex Millmow has commented that, when Niemeyer, his adviser Professor Theodore Gregory, and assistant Raymond Kershaw (an Australian economist) arrived in July 1930 they were unaware of the political storm they were to cause, for Niemeyer would bring English orthodox economics down on Australia's head. The high point of Niemeyer's tour was his address at the Melbourne Conference of Commonwealth and State leaders, where he said that the 'cold facts must be faced' ... 'In short, Australia is off budget equilibrium, off exchange equilibrium, and faced by considerable unfunded and maturing debts both internally and externally, in addition to which she has on her hands a very large program of loan works for which no financial provision has been made'. He warned Australia had two years 'to get its house in order' before a tranche of external debt matured in 1932. He believed Australians were too optimistic about the country's prospects.

He was critical of Australia's overconfidence and essentially said that Australia was "living beyond its means" and had become prosperous through "mistakes"; that Australians would have to "accept a lower standard of living"; that Australia should continue to exist only as a means to supply Britain with goods; and that its protectionist attitude was deviating Australia from its true purpose.

The federal and state heads of government gave mixed responses to Niemeyer's plan. The governments of Australia later met to negotiate a compromise in 1931, known as the Premiers' Plan. Populists like Jack Lang and former prime minister Billy Hughes decried Niemeyer's diagnosis and therapy. Anti-English and anti-German sentiment were both at play in the general public rejection of Niemeyer's advice, as well as anti-Semitism (it being wrongly assumed that he was Jewish). He was seen as promoting the interests of wealthy overseas bankers at the expense of the Australian people, who were struggling to cope with the Great Depression.

=== Other activities and honours ===
Outside the Bank of England, Niemeyer was a director of the Bank of International Settlements from 1931 to 1965, at the same time as Walther Funk (1938–1939), serving as chairman from 1937 to 1940 and vice-chairman from 1940 to 1946. He helped set up the National Association for Mental Health, serving as provisional chairman from 1943 to 1946. He was a governor of St Paul's School, Marlborough College, and the London School of Economics, serving as chairman of LSE from 1941 to 1957. Niemeyer was appointed Companion of the Order of the Bath (CB) in 1921, Knight Commander of the Order of the Bath (KCB) in the 1924 Birthday Honours, and Knight Grand Cross of the Order of the British Empire (GBE) in 1927.

== See also ==
- Money doctor

Honorary titles
Preceded by Sir Patrick Cooper	High Sheriff of the County of London; 1945–1946	Succeeded by Cameron Cobbold
