= Macmillan Committee =

British government advisory committee

The Macmillan Committee, officially known as the Committee on Finance and Industry, was a committee, composed mostly of economists, formed by the British Labour government after the 1929 stock market crash to determine the root causes of the depressed economy of the United Kingdom. The Macmillan Committee was formed in 1929 by Royal Command 3897, and it was tasked with determining whether the contemporary banking and financial system was helping or hindering British trade and industry. Scottish lawyer Hugh Pattison Macmillan was named as its chairman, although due to his lack of economic or financial expertise, he largely "remained in the background". Other members of the committee included Ernest Bevin, Lord Bradbury, R. H. Brand, Theodore Gregory, John Maynard Keynes, and Reginald McKenna.

The committee took evidence from many leading economists of the day, such as Arthur Cecil Pigou, D. H. Robertson and Lionel Robbins, on the subject of unemployment. It decided in favour of the so-called Treasury view that expenditure on public works was not the answer, in spite of the signing of Addendum 1 by some of its leading members. This addendum, which was signed by Keynes, A.A.G. Tullock, J. Frater Taylor, Sir T. Allen, Ernest Bevin and R. McKenna, advocated a programme of public works and import restrictions. However the committee insisted that monetary policy should be concerned with 'the maintenance of the parity of the foreign exchanges before the avoidance of the credit cycle and the stability of the price level.' The committee published its findings and recommendations in the Report of Committee on Finance and Industry, or more simply, the Macmillan Report, in June 1931.

The Macmillan Report "served as a venue in which J. M. Keynes challenged the 'Treasury View'", according to economist Friedrich von Hayek. The report was largely authored by Keynes, and it recommended several Keynesian policies such as nationalization of the Bank of England (which later happened in 1946) and government regulation of international trade. Historian Charles Loch Mowat characterized these recommendations as "cautious" and said that, by the time of its publication, they "had been almost overtaken by events". Its members disagreed on some points and one member dissented on its findings. These opinions and reservations were included in the report's extensive addenda.

The report also asserted that "the relations between the British financial world and British industry ... have never been so close as" those respective relationships in Germany and those in the United States. From this conclusion arose the term the "Macmillan Gap". As such, many Britons felt that their banks were failing their industrial base. This view did not consider the balance that banking institutions needed to strike between their depositors, who desired high interest rates and liquidity, and their debtors, that is, those in industry, who desired low-interest loans that could not be recalled quickly. Investments of relatively small amounts of money were riskier and more costly for lenders, which put small businesses seeking loans at a disadvantage. While the report dedicated only 300 words to such a disparity, the term Macmillan Gap is the most enduring part of the report. It was also one of the few recommendations which were acted upon. In response to the committee's suggestion, an institution was created in 1945 to finance small businesses: the Industrial and Commercial Finance Corporation.

The maintenance of the exchange rate was agreed to be the first priority by all, including the signatories of Addendum 1. Two months after the report was published the UK came off the Gold Standard and the exchange rate depreciated immediately by 2% and continued downwards for 12 months.
