= Yi Fuxian =

Chinese medical researcher

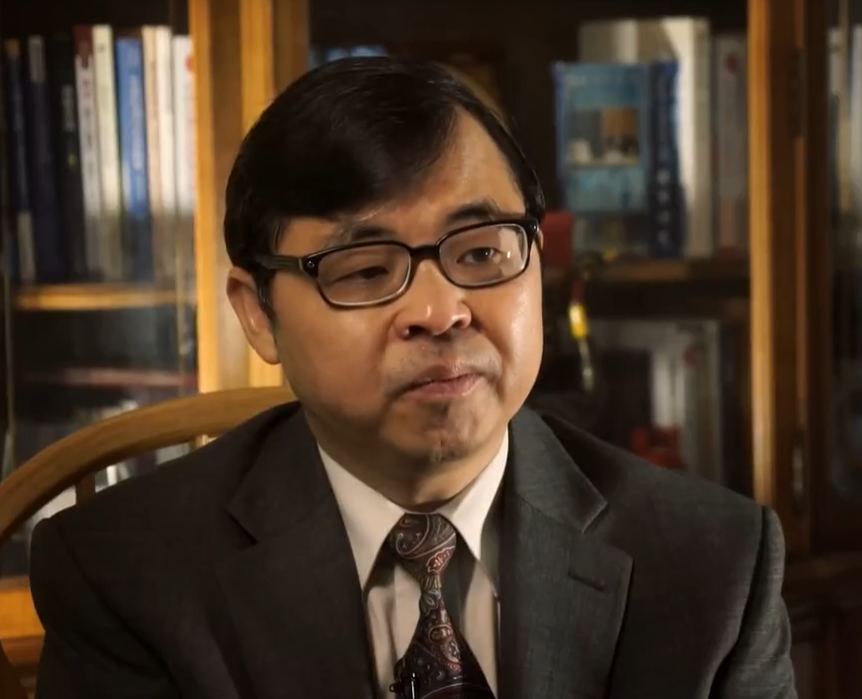
Yi Fuxian

Yi Fuxian (Chinese: 易富贤) is a Chinese demographer and obstetrics and gynecology (OB/GYN) researcher at the University of Wisconsin-Madison and author of the 2007 book Big Country with an Empty Nest, which criticized China's birth policies. The book was banned in mainland China from the time of publication until 2013, when a Chinese government press published a new edition and promoted the book.

In 2019, Yi claimed that China's population had already started declining with a total fertility rate (TFR) of only 1.1, when the official projections were still at 1.8. Furthermore, Yi has estimated that China's population is only 1.28 billion, instead of the 1.41 billion the government claims. Yi has raised concerns about the integrity of the government's birth rate data and estimated that China's population may fall to as low as 330 million by 2100. In 2026, Yi estimated that, at current trends, China's population could fall to 1.01 billion by 2050, 620 million by 2075, and 320 million by 2100.

== See also ==
- Demographics of China
- Aging of China
