= Theodore Gregory =

British economist (1890–1970)

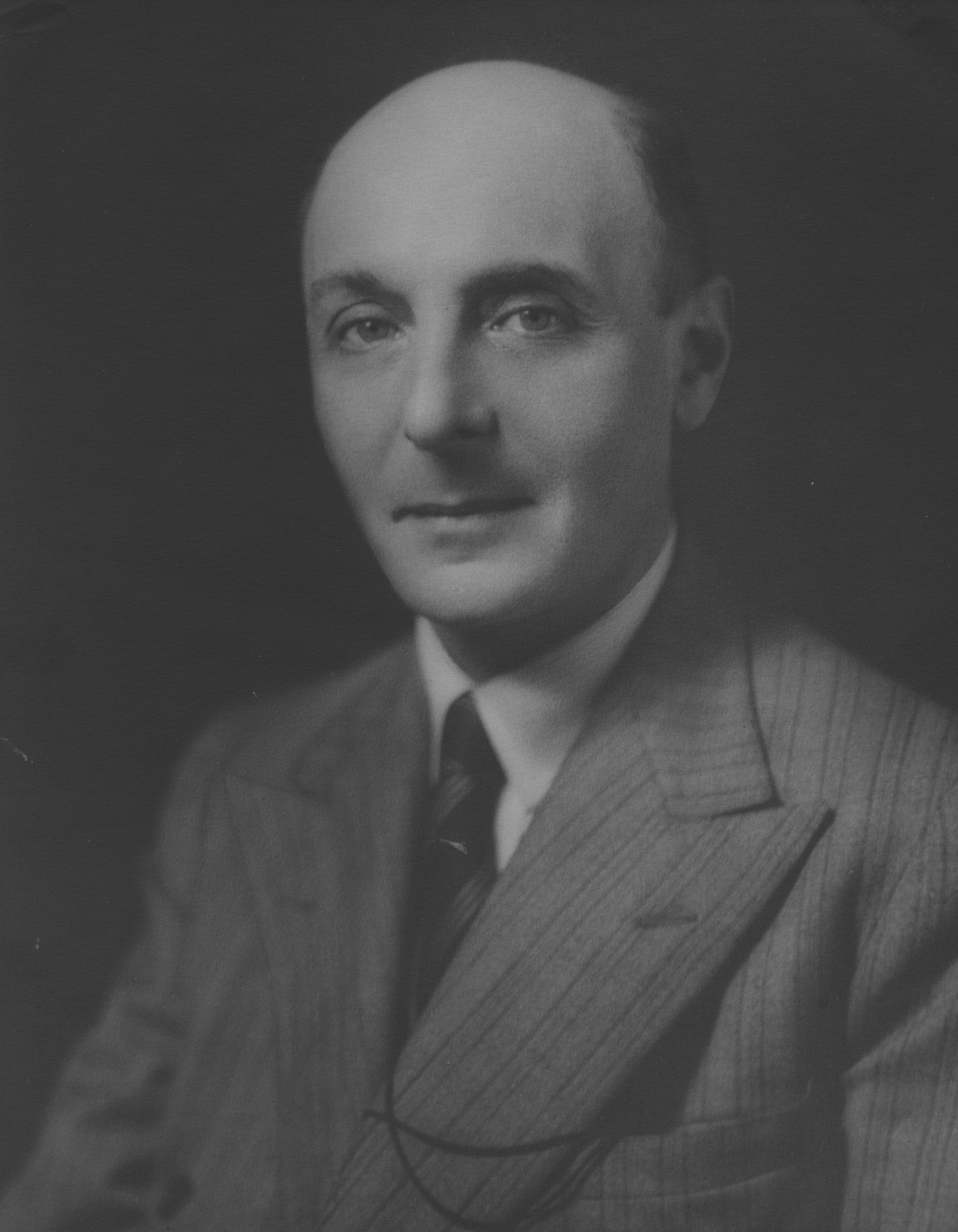
- Professor Theodore Emmanuel Gugenheim Gregory, c. 1938
- Born: 10 September 1890; London, England
- Died: 24 December 1970 (aged 80); Athens, Greece

Academic background
- Education: London School of Economics

Academic work
- Discipline: Economics, Political Economy, History of Economic Thought
- School or tradition: classical liberalism
- Institutions: London School of Economics

Sir Theodore Emmanuel Gugenheim Gregory (10 September 1890 – 24 December 1970) was a British economist.

== Biography ==
Theodore Gregory was born in London on 10 September 1890. Gregory was educated at Dame Alice Owen's School in Islington. He attended the London School of Economics and Political Science. Gregory was an Assistant and Lecturer at the LSE between 1913 and 1919. Gregory was Cassel Reader in International Trade at the LSE in 1920. Gregory was Sir E. Cassel Professor of Economics in the University of London between 1927 and 1937. He was Dean of the Faculty of Economics at London University between 1927 and 1930. Gregory was a Senator of London University between 1928 and 1930. Gregory was the Newmarch Lecturer at University College London in 1929.

Gregory was a member of the Macmillan Committee on Industry and Finance from 1929 to 1931. He was Economic Adviser for the Niemeyer Mission to Australia and New Zealand in 1930. He was a member of the Irish Free State Banking Commission from 1934 to 1937. Gregory was Economic Adviser to the Government of India from 1938 to 1946. Gregory was Chairman of the Food Grains Policy Committee (India) in 1943.

Gregory was appointed an Honorary Fellow of the London School of Economics in 1958. He was appointed a Commander of the Order of George I of Greece. He was appointed a Commander of the Austrian Order of Merit. Gregory was appointed President of Section F of the British Association in 1930.

Gregory died in Athens on 24 December 1970.

== List of works ==
- Tariffs: A Study in Method. Charles Griffin and Company, Ltd. 1921 – via Internet Archive.
- Foreign Exchange: Before, During, and After the War. London, Edinburgh, Glasgow, Copenhagen etc.: Humphrey Milford (Oxford University Press). 1922 – via Internet Archive.
- Present Position of Banking in America (1925)
- The Return to Gold (1925)
- First Year of the Gold Standard (1926)
- Gregory, T.E.; Dalton, Hugh, eds. (1927). London Essays in Economics: In Honour of Edwin Cannan. London: George Routledge & Sons Ltd. – via Internet Archive.
- Introduction to Tooke and Newmarch's History of Prices and of the State of Circulation from 1792 to 1856. London: P. S. King & Son. 1928 – via Internet Archive.
- The Practical Working of the Federal Reserve System in the US (1930)
- The Gold Standard and Its Future (3rd ed.). London: Methuen & Co. Ltd. 1934 – via Internet Archive.; via Mises.org
- Gold, Unemployment and Capitalism. London: P. S. King & Son, Ltd. 1933 – via Internet Archive.
- The Westminster Bank Through a Century (1936)
- India on the Eve of the Third Five-Year Plan (1960)
- Ernst Oppenheimer and the Economic Development of Southern Africa (1962)
- Select Statutes, Documents and Reports relating to British Banking. London: Frank Cass and Co. Ltd. 1964 – via Internet Archive. - the book was first published by Oxford University Press in 1922.

Professional and academic associations
Preceded by Sir Drummond Fraser	President of the Manchester Statistical Society; 1913–15	Succeeded by Barnard Ellinger
