= William Newmarch =

English banker, economist and statistician

William Newmarch (28 January 1820 – 23 March 1882) was an English banker, economist and statistician.

== Life ==
Born at Thirsk, Yorkshire, Newmarch went to school in York; as a young man, he held posts as a clerk there. A clerk for a stamp distributor, he moved on to the Yorkshire Fire and Life Office, and then to the banking house Leatham, Few, and Co., in Wakefield (1843–1846). He then moved to London and worked for three financial institutions:

- the Agra Bank (1846–1851)
- secretary to the Globe Insurance Company (1851–1862)
- chief officer in the banking-house of Glyn, Mills & Co. (1862–1881)

Newmarch took an active part in the Royal Statistical Society, of which he was one of the honorary secretaries, editor of its journal, and President (1869–1871), and the Political Economy Club. He was also elected a fellow of the Royal Society.

Newmarch died at Torquay on 23 March 1882 and was buried at West Norwood Cemetery.

== Works ==
In early life Newmarch published a Guide to York, undertook correspondence in the Sheffield Iris, and gave lectures. He contributed articles to magazines and newspapers. His knowledge of banking was displayed before the select parliamentary committee on the Bank Acts in 1857.

Newmarch collaborated with Thomas Tooke in the two final volumes of his History of Prices and was responsible for most of the work in them. For 19 years he wrote a survey of the commercial history of the year in The Economist.

== Legacy ==
After Newmarch's death, friends founded a Newmarch Lectureship in economic science and statistics at University College London. Arthur Bowley, Josiah Stamp, Udny Yule, and Theodore Gregory were amongst the lecturers.
