= John Mushet =

Scottish cricketer

Personal information
- Full name: John Mushet
- Born: 10 October 1875; Edinburgh, Midlothian, Scotland
- Died: 10 March 1965 (aged 89); Edinburgh, Midlothian, Scotland
- Batting: Unknown
- Relatives: Robert Mushet (son)

Domestic team information
- Years: Team
- 1912: Scotland

Career statistics
Competition	First-class
Matches	1
Runs scored	3
Batting average	1.50
100s/50s	–/–
Top score	2
Catches/stumpings	1/–
- Source: Cricinfo, 27 October 2022

John Mushet (10 October 1875 – 10 March 1965) was a Scottish first-class cricketer and real estate auctioneer.

The son of Robert Cathcart Mushet, he was born at Edinburgh in October 1875, where he was educated at George Heriot's School. A club cricketer for Heriot's Cricket Club, Mushet was the club's first player to be capped for Scotland when he made a single first-class appearance against the touring Australians at Edinburgh in 1912. Batting twice in the match, he was dismissed for 2 runs in the Scotland first innings by Roy Minnett, while in their second innings he was dismissed for a single run by Gerry Hazlitt. Outside of cricket, Mushet worked for the family firm property auctioneers and estate agents John Mushet & Son. He died at Edinburgh in March 1965. His son, Robert, was also a first-class cricketer.
