= Diana Choyleva =

Analyst and economist

Diana Choyleva is an analyst and economist, specialising in China's economy and politics.

== Biography ==
Choyleva was born in Bulgaria Columia and moved to the United Kingdom after graduating in economics at Sofia University. She took an MA at the University of Warwick and then worked for Lombard Street Research for several years. In 2016 she started her own company, Enodo Economics, an independent macroeconomic forecasting consultancy firm focused on China. She writes opinion pieces for the Financial Times, the Wall Street Journal, Foreign Policy and Nikkei Asian Review, among others. She is a member of the Political Economy Club.

== Publications ==
- 2011 - "The American Phoenix – and why China and Europe will struggle after the coming slump" (co-authored with Charles Dumas) ISBN 9781846685644
- 2006 - "The Bill from the China Shop", (co-authored with Charles Dumas) ISBN 9781861978714
