= John Fullarton (writer) =

Scottish traveller and writer

John Fullarton (c. 1780 – 1849) was a Scottish traveller and writer on the currency.

== Life ==
Fullarton was the only child of Dr. Gavin Fullarton, who died in 1795, by his wife, the daughter of Alexander Dunlop, professor of Greek in the university of Glasgow. He went to India as a medical officer in the service of the East India Company, became an assistant surgeon in the Bengal Presidency in 1802, but resigned his appointment in 1813. During this period he became the part owner and editor of a newspaper at Calcutta.

On leaving the service Fullarton entered the house of Alexander & Co., bankers of Calcutta, as a partner, acquired a fortune in a few years, and returned to England to live. Meantime he had travelled widely over India, and about 1820 made a pioneering tour through the British Empire in the east.

In 1823 he purchased Lord Essex's house, 1 Great Stanhope Street, Mayfair. The reform crisis led him to contribute articles to the Quarterly Review in defence of the Tory party, and he is said to have been one of the founders of the Carlton Club. During these years he made extensive tours through Great Britain and the continent in a coach fitted up with a library and other luxuries.

In 1833 he went again to India, and in the following year was entrusted with a mission to China. On his return to Europe he visited Egypt, where at Memphis his wife, Miss Finney of Calcutta, died in 1837. In 1838 having lost a considerable part of his fortune by the failure of his bankers, he moved to 12 Hyde Park Street. Fullarton was a fellow of the Royal Asiatic Society, and took great interest in art, literature, and the drama. He died on 24 October 1849.

== Works ==
In 1844, during the progress of the Bank Charter Act through parliament, he published in support of the doctrines of Thomas Tooke a book 'On the Regulation of Currencies, being an examination of the principles on which it is proposed to restrict the future issues on credit of the Bank of England.
