= Thomas Tooke =

19th-century English economist

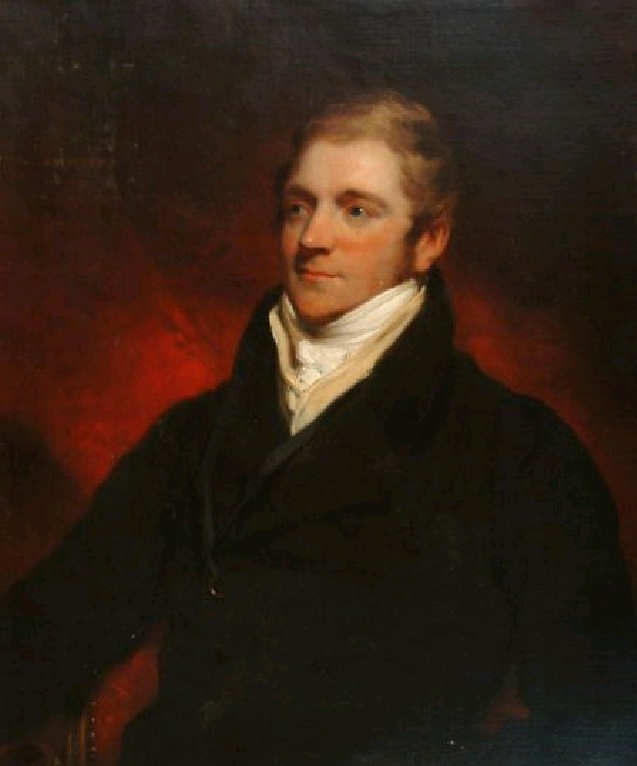
- Born: 28 February 1774; Kronstadt, Russian Empire
- Died: 26 February 1858 (aged 83); London, England

Academic work
- Discipline: Econometrics
- School or tradition: Classical economics

Thomas Tooke (/tʊk/; 28 February 1774 – 26 February 1858) was an English economist known for writing on money and economic statistics. After Tooke's death the Statistical Society endowed the Tooke Chair of economics at King's College London, and a Tooke Prize.

In business, he served several terms between 1840 and 1852 as governor of the Royal Exchange Assurance Corporation. Likewise, he served for several terms as chairman of the Saint Katharine Dock Company. He was also an early director of the London and Birmingham Railway.

== Life ==
Born at Kronstadt on 29 February 1774, he was the eldest son of William Tooke, at that time chaplain to the British factory there. Thomas began his professional life at the age of fifteen in a house of business at St Petersburg, and subsequently became a partner in the London firms of Stephen Thornton & Co., and Astell, Tooke, & Thornton.

He took no serious part in discussion of economic questions until 1819, when he gave evidence before committees of both Houses of Parliament on the resumption of cash payments by the Bank of England. Tooke was one of the earliest supporters of the free trade movement which assumed the form in the petition of the merchants of the City of London presented to the House of Commons by Alexander Baring, on 8 May 1820. This document was drawn up by Tooke; and the circumstances which led to its preparation are described in the sixth volume of his A History of Prices. Lord Liverpool's government, especially through William Huskisson after 1828, moved in the direction sought.

It was to support the principles of the merchants' petition that Tooke, with David Ricardo, Robert Malthus, James Mill, and others, founded the Political Economy Club in April 1821. From the beginning Tooke took part in its discussions, and continued to attend its meetings to the end of his life.

Out of controversy over paper money emerged the Bank Charter Act 1844, the main object of which was to prevent the over-issue of notes. Tooke was opposed to the provisions of the act. He thought that by some changes in the management of the Bank of England, coupled with the compulsory maintenance of a much larger reserve of bullion, more satisfactory results would be achieved.

Besides giving evidence on economic questions before several parliamentary committees, such as those of 1821 on agricultural depression and on foreign trade, of 1832, 1840, and 1848 on the Bank Acts, Tooke was a member of the factories inquiry commission of 1833. He retired from active business on his own account in 1836, but was governor of the Royal Exchange Assurance Corporation from 1840 to 1852, and was also chairman of the Saint Katharine Dock Company. He was elected a Fellow of the Royal Society in March 1821, and membre correspondant de l'Institut de France (Académie des Sciences Morales et Politiques) in February 1853. He resided in London at 12 Russell Square, then later in Richmond Terrace, and at 31 Spring Gardens, where he died on 26 February 1858. He is buried at Kensal Green Cemetery.

In the year after Tooke's death the Tooke professorship of economic science and statistics at King's College, London, was founded in his memory, the endowment being raised by public subscription. There was a watercolour sketch of Tooke in the office of the Royal Exchange Assurance Corporation, and a portrait was painted by Sir Martin Archer Shee.

== Works ==
As a follower of Ricardo, Francis Horner, and Huskisson, Tooke was a supporter of the principles embodied in the report of the bullion committee of 1810. The three years which followed the Resumption of Cash Payments Act 1819 were marked by a fall in the prices of nearly all commodities. An opinion gained ground that the fall was due to a contraction of the currency which was assumed to result from the return to cash payments. To combat this view was the task to which Tooke applied himself in his earliest work, Thoughts and Details on the High and Low Prices of the last Thirty Years (1823), and the same line of argument is pursued in his Considerations on the State of the Currency (1826), and in a Letter to Lord Grenville (1829). He entered on a detailed examination of the causes which might affect prices, and claimed to establish the conclusion that the variations, both during the period of restriction and after the resumption, were due to circumstances directly connected with the commodities themselves, and not to alterations in the quantity of money.

=== The History of Prices ===
Tooke is best known for his A History of Prices and of the State of the Circulation during the Years 1793–1856 (6 vols., 1838–1857). In the first four volumes he treats (a) of the prices of corn, and the circumstances affecting prices; (b) the prices of produce other than corn; and (c) the state of the circulation. The two final volumes, written with William Newmarch, deal with railways, free trade, banking in Europe and the effects of new discoveries of gold.

The first two volumes dealt with the period from 1793 to 1837, and were published in 1838. His conclusions were that the high prices which, speaking generally, ruled between 1793 and 1814 were due to a relatively large number of unfavourable seasons, coupled with the obstructions to trade which were created by the Napoleonic Wars; while the lower range of prices in the subsequent years was attributable to a series of more prolific seasons, the removal of the state of war, and improvement in the processes of manufacture and industry.

A History of Prices was completed in six volumes; the third, dealing with the years 1838–9, was published in 1840, the fourth in 1848, and the fifth and sixth in 1857, the year before Tooke's death. The whole work comprises an analysis of the financial and commercial history of the period which it covers. The later volumes record of the steps by which Tooke gradually severed himself from the supporters of the currency theory, the direct heirs of the bullionists of 1810 and 1819. This summary of Tooke's views represents his opinions as they took shape between 1840 and 1844, and were defined in his Enquiry into the Currency Principle (1844). But in his earlier writings there are many passages inconsistent with his later opinions.

The supporters of the 'currency theory,' whose principles were adopted by Robert Peel and embodied in the Bank Charter Act 1844, were represented by Samuel Jones Loyd, Robert Torrens, and George Warde Norman. They contended that banks of issue, by the arbitrary extension of their circulation, could produce a direct effect on prices, and thus stimulate financial speculation; that convertibility on demand was not a sufficient safeguard; and that the only adequate remedy was to separate the business of issue from that of banking in such a way that the former should regulate itself automatically, and that the discretion of the directors should be confined to the latter.

Tooke, on the other hand, reinforced later on by John Fullarton and James Wilson, maintained that a paper currency which was readily convertible on demand must necessarily conform to the value of a purely metallic currency; that for this purpose no other regulation was required beyond ready convertibility; that under these conditions banks had no power of arbitrarily increasing their issues; and that the level of prices was not directly affected by such issues. Before the committee of 1832 Tooke stated that, according to his experience, a rise or fall of prices had invariably preceded, and could not therefore be caused by, an enlargement or contraction of the circulation. This view, while inconsistent with the quantity theory of money, is consistent with the real bills doctrine. On this view, a fall in the value of the assets of a money-issuing bank would cause the value of the bank's notes to fall. The public would then require more notes to conduct business, and the bank would willingly issue those notes to customers who offered assets of adequate value in exchange. Thus the quantity of notes would increase after the price level had risen.

== Family ==
He married, in 1802, Priscilla Combe, by whom he had three sons.

== Bibliography ==
A History of Prices in six volumes:

- Thomas Tooke (1838). A History of Prices and of the State of Circulation. Vol. 1. Longman. ISBN 9780384609471.
- Thomas Tooke (1838). A History of Prices and of the State of Circulation. Vol. 2. Longman. ISBN 9780384609471.
- Thomas Tooke (1840). A History of Prices and of the State of Circulation. Vol. 3. Longman.
- Thomas Tooke (1848). A History of Prices and of the State of Circulation. Vol. 4. Longman.
- Thomas Tooke; William Newmarch (1857). A History of Prices, and of the State of the Circulation. Vol. 5. Longman, Brown, Green, and Roberts.
- Thomas Tooke (1857). A History of Prices and of the State of Circulation. Vol. 6. Longman.
