= Robert Mushet (writer) =

Robert Mushe
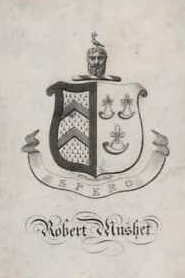
- Armorial bookplate of Robert Mushet
- Born: 1782; Scotland, United Kingdom
- Died: 1828
- Occupation(s): Writer, civil servant
- Known for: Scottish official of the Royal Mint
- Notable work: Writings on currency and economics
- Spouse: Henrietta Hunter
- Children: 1 (Magdalene Christian Mushet)

Robert Mushet (1782–1828) was a Scottish official of the Royal Mint, and writer on financial topics.

== Life ==
The sixth son of William Mushet and Margaret Cochrane his wife, he was born at Dalkeith on 10 November 1782; David Mushet was his brother. He entered the service of the Royal Mint about 1804, and in the Royal Kalendar for 1808 he appears as third clerk to the master. Subsequently he held the post of first clerk to the master, melter, and refiner.

Mushet gave evidence before the House of Lords committee on the resumption of cash payments on 29 March and 7 April 1819, as an expert on the currency question. He was also examined before Robert Peel's committee in the House of Commons on the same subject, on 19 March. He stated that he had constructed tables of the exchanges and prices of gold from 1760 to 1810. He was a founder member of the Political Economy Club.

In 1823 Mushet took out a patent (No. 4802) for preparing copper for sheathing ships by alloying it with small quantities of zinc, tin, antimony, and arsenic. He died at Millfield House, Edmonton, on 1 February 1828.

== Works ==
Mushet wrote:

- An Enquiry into the Effect produced on the National Currency and Rates of Exchange by the Bank Restriction Bill, 2nd ed., 1810; 3rd ed., 1811. This was noticed in the Edinburgh Review, 1810, xvii. 340.
- Tables exhibiting the Gain and Loss to the Fundholder arising from the Fluctuations of the Value of the Currency from 1800 to 1821, 2nd ed., corrected, 1821.
- An Attempt to explain from Facts the Effect of the Issues of the Bank of England upon its own Interests, Public Credit, and Country Banks, 1826. This was noticed in the Quarterly Review, 1829, xxxix. 451.

Mushet also wrote in the 1818 Supplement to the Encyclopædia Britannica, on "Coinage". The article described innovations in casting he had worked out, with James William Morrison of the Mint.

== Family ==
Mushet married Henrietta, daughter of John Hunter of St Andrews, by whom he had issue.

== Notes ==
Attribution

This article incorporates text from a publication now in the public domain: Lee, Sidney, ed. (1894). "Mushet, Robert (1782-1828)". Dictionary of National Biography. Vol. 39. London: Smith, Elder & Co.
