= The Great Hunger: Ireland 1845–1849 =

1962 book by Cecil Woodham-Smith

The Great Hunger
- First edition (UK)
- Author: Cecil Woodham-Smith
- Language: English
- Subject: The Great Famine in Ireland, 1845–1849
- Publisher: Hamish Hamilton (UK); Harper and Row (US)
- Publication date: 1962
- Publication place: Ireland
- Media type: Print (Hardcover & Paperback)
- ISBN: 978-0140145151

The Great Hunger is a 1962 book about the 1845–1849 Great Famine in Ireland by the British historian Cecil Woodham-Smith. It was published by Harper and Row and Penguin Books.

The British broadcaster and journalist Robert Kee described it, "A masterpiece of the historian's art". The British historian Denis Brogan said that it was "A moving and terrible book. It combines great literary power with great learning. It explains much in modern Ireland – and in modern America".
