= Robert Mushet (cricketer) =

Scottish cricketer

Personal information
- Full name: Robert Cathcart Mushet
- Born: 10 December 1901; Glasgow, Lanarkshire, Scotland
- Died: 25 July 1992 (aged 90); Dunbar, East Lothian, Scotland
- Batting: Right-handed
- Bowling: Right-arm medium
- Relatives: John Mushet (father)

Domestic team information
- Years: Team
- 1934/35–1939/40: Europeans

Career statistics
Competition	First-class
Matches	2
Runs scored	17
Batting average	8.50
100s/50s	–/–
Top score	8
Balls bowled	78
Wickets	1
Bowling average	88.00
5 wickets in innings	–
10 wickets in match	–
Best bowling	1/47
Catches/stumpings	1/–
- Source: Cricinfo, 1 December 2023

Robert Cathcart Mushet (10 December 1901 – 25 July 1992) was a Scottish first-class cricketer.

The son of the cricketer John Mushet, he was born at Glasgow in December 1901. Mushet spent time in British India, where he appeared in two first-class cricket matches for the Europeans cricket team, separated by five years. The first came against the Hindus cricket team at the Bombay Gymkhana in the 1935–35 Bombay Quadrangular, while the second came against the same opponents at the Brabourne Stadium in the 1939-40 Bombay Pentangular. In these, scored 17 runs with a highest score of 18, while with his right-arm medium-pace, he took a single wicket. Outside of cricket, he was a shipping merchant and company director by profession. Mushet died at Dunbar in July 1992, following a long illness.
