= Cecil Woodham-Smith =

British historian and biographer

Cecil Blanche Woodham-Smith (née Fitzgerald; 29 April 1896 – 16 March 1977) CBE was a British historian and biographer. She wrote four popular history books, each dealing with a different aspect of the Victorian era.

== Early life ==
Cecil Woodham-Smith was born in 1896 in Tenby, Wales. Her family, the Fitzgeralds, were a well-known Irish family, one of her ancestors being Lord Edward Fitzgerald, hero of the Irish Rebellion of 1798. Her father Colonel James FitzGerald had served in the Indian Army during the Sepoy Mutiny; her mother's family included General Sir Thomas Picton, a distinguished soldier who was killed at Waterloo.

She attended the Royal School for Officers' Daughters in Bath, until her expulsion for taking unannounced leave for a trip to the National Gallery. She finished her schooling at a French convent and afterwards entered St Hilda's College, Oxford. She graduated with a second-class degree in English in 1917.

In 1928 she married George Ivon Woodham-Smith, a London solicitor with whom she remained until his death in 1968. She postponed her career until her two children left for boarding school. In the meantime, she wrote potboilers under the pseudonym Janet Gordon, learning narrative writing skills she later used as a historian.

== Career ==
Woodham-Smith's first book as a historian, a biography of Florence Nightingale published in 1950 by Constable, took her straight to the top of her profession. Her meticulous research had taken nine years, and the book succeeded in restoring Nightingale's reputation, which had dwindled following Lytton Strachey's representation of her in Eminent Victorians. Acclaimed for its combination of scholarship and readability, Florence Nightingale won the James Tait Black Award for biography.

Her next book was equally well received. The Reason Why (1953, Constable) was a study of the Charge of the Light Brigade, a military disaster during the Crimean War and one of the defining events of the Victorian age. It became her most popular book, and afterwards she explained to a television audience how she wrote it: working at a gallop through thirty-six hours non-stop without food or other break until the last gun was fired, when she poured a stiff drink and slept for two days. Though the work was critically acclaimed, it came to the conclusion that the allies had lost the Crimean War, which most historians conclude is not true.

She produced two more notable works. The first was The Great Hunger: Ireland 1845–1849 (1962), a history of the Great Famine of the 1840s, which was critical of the British government's handling of the famine, in particular singling out Sir Charles Trevelyan for criticism, although she did acknowledge that the British government assisted during the first phase of the famine. The second was the first volume of Queen Victoria: Her Life and Times (1972). She was unable to complete the next volume of the biography, and died in London in 1977 at the age of 82.

Woodham-Smith was appointed CBE in 1960. She received honorary doctorates from the National University of Ireland in 1964 and the University of St Andrews in 1965. In November 1965 she delivered the RCP's Lloyd Roberts Lecture. She became an honorary fellow of St Hilda's College (her alma mater) in 1967.

Alan Bennett wrote of her:

Cecil was a frail woman with a tiny bird-like skull, looking more like Elizabeth I (in later life) than Edith Sitwell ever did (and minus her sheet metal earrings). Irish, she had a Firbankian wit and a lovely turn of phrase. ‘Do you know the Atlantic at all?’ she once asked me and I put the line into Habeas Corpus and got a big laugh on it. From a grand Irish family she was quite snobbish; talking of someone she said: ‘Then he married a Mitford … but that’s a stage everybody goes through.’ Even the most ordinary remark would be given her own particular twist and she could be quite camp. Conversation had once turned, as conversations will, to fork-lift trucks. Feeling that industrial machinery might be remote from Cecil’s sphere of interest I said: ‘Do you know what a fork-lift truck is?’ She looked at me in her best Annie Walker manner. ‘I do. To my cost.’
