= Docklands Strategic Development Zone =

The Docklands Strategic Development Zone (SDZ) (known officially as the North Lotts and Grand Canal Dock SDZ Planning Scheme) is a controversial strategic planning area in Dublin, Ireland located east of the city centre on both sides of the River Liffey in the North Wall and Grand Canal Dock areas.

On 18 December 2012, the Government of Ireland via the Minister for Housing, Planning and Local Government, Phil Hogan designated the area an SDZ pursuant to its powers under the Planning and Development Act 2000. This was the first step in establishing a new framework to try to facilitate faster development in these areas. It replaced the regime overseen by the Dublin Docklands Development Authority (DDDA), which was taken over by Dublin City Council in 2014.

== SDZ Planning Scheme ==
Strategic Development Zones, sometimes referred to as SDZs, were established in the Planning and Development Act 2000. SDZs are areas of land designated by the Government for development that is considered to be of social or economic importance. This development can be residential, commercial or industrial in nature.

On 16 May 2014 An Bord Pleanala approved the making of a planning scheme for the area subject to modifications as set out in its decision. Under the scheme, some 366,000 square metres of office space and 2,600 homes will be developed across 22 hectares of land in the North Lotts and Grand Canal Dock.

In the North Lotts area, the new hubs will be at Spencer Dock and the Point Village. South of the river, the replacement for the U2 Tower will anchor another hub, while two more hubs will be clustered around Barrow Street including the Boland's Mill site, and Grand Canal Square.

Two landmark buildings up to 22 storeys (88m) are allowed, but most development will be eight-storeys high. SDZ status means that projects can be fast-tracked through planning, subject to criteria. NAMA plans to invest €2bn in new projects over the coming years, and is a key landholder across the Docklands including sites previously controlled by Treasury Holdings, developer Harry Crosbie and the Dublin Docklands Development Authority.

== History ==
=== 2012-2015: Origins and planning stages ===
The SDZ Planning Scheme replaces the DDDA North Lotts and Grand Canal Dock Planning Schemes that had been generated under the Planning and Development Act 2000 (the 2000 Act), focusing on urban regeneration of Dublin's docklands and redundant port areas. While the Master Plan prepared by the Dublin Docklands Development Authority (DDDA) covered an area of approximately 520 hectares, the centre of gravity of redevelopment focused on the areas in the North Lotts, extending eastwards from the Custom House Docks (phase 1 & 2) including the IFSC and Spencer Dock, and on the Grand Canal Dock area south of the River Liffey.

The collapse of the banking sector in wake of the 2008 financial crisis, combined with a major downturn in the Irish economy, had a profound impact on the development sector and on the regeneration programme within Docklands. Most major property developers are now linked with NAMA - there was paralysis in the construction sector, and investor confidence had dried up. The SDZ Planning Scheme is geared to unlock the current set of difficulties and provide a blueprint for the years ahead. In renewing the vision, the SDZ process has drawn on a wide set of new perspectives, aimed at consolidating the platform achieved but also providing a sustainable underpinning for the future.

The consolidated Planning Scheme document, incorporating the modifications approved by the City Council on 5 November 2013, together with the further modifications approved by An Bord Pleanala on 16 May 2014, is available on the Dublin Docklands website.

On 14 October 2014, it was reported that U2 would buy 16 Hanover Quay from the Dublin Docklands Development Authority for €450,000. The authority had forced the band to sell its old riverfront studio on Hanover Quay for an undisclosed price in 2002 to allow development of the Grand Canal Harbour area. As part of that deal the authority had promised the band the top two floors of the 32-storey tower it was planning to build on an adjacent quay, a project that was subsequently put on hold. In light of its imminent dissolution and the recent approval by An Bord Plenala for the North Lotts and Grand Canal Planning scheme, the authority decided it would not be proceeding with a proposed compulsory purchase order of 16 and 18 Hanover Quay.

In December 2014 a planning application was submitted for a major commercial and residential development in Dublin's south docklands that is being planned by US investment group Oaktree Capital Management, Irish construction company Bennett and the National Asset Management Agency. The development will comprise 42,500 square metres of offices and apartments at 5 Hanover Quay and 76 Sir John Rogerson's Quay. The construction costs are estimated at €140 million with the project set to accommodate up to 2,400 workers and 158 apartments when fully developed. About 250 workers will be employed during the construction phase of the project, which is expected to have a value of €450 million on completion.

A number of site plan notices were posted in the area including the following:

- On 4 December 2014, a site plan notice was posted describing the developments to take place at the Boland's Mill site including retaining and restoring old stone buildings to accommodate retail/restaurant/café use, cultural/exhibition use, and residences; and the construction of three new towers (13 to 15 storeys, maximum height 53.65m) to accommodate offices and residences. There will also be three new pedestrian routes from Barrow St., new civic waterfront square adjacent to the dock.
- On 12 December 2014, two site plan notices were posted for Targeted Investment Opportunities PLC describing the developments to take place at the former Kilsaran Concrete site at 5 Hanover Quay. One notice is for the construction of a 7-storey office building. The other notice is for the construction of a 7-8-storey building to accommodate residences and mixed-use, including 100 apartments, a leisure centre, and space for 1 retail and 2 cafes at ground level.

On 20 March 2015, planning permission was granted for the first planning application under the SDZ scheme. The plans include a development by Targeted Investment Opportunities Plc. at No. 76 Sir John Rogerson's Quay, Dublin 2, for a mixed use scheme. The development consists of a 7 to 10 storey structure with 58 apartments and approximately 9,000 sq.m of office space. The development also provided for the new Chocolate Park public open space.

=== 2015-present ===
Several projects were completed since 2015, including the iconic Central Bank of Ireland headquarters on North Wall Quay. By early 2018, much of the SDZ had been designated for corporate construction. In March 2018, President of the National College of Ireland, Gina Quin complained, stating: "less than 1 per cent of the total build space in the North Lotts/Docklands SDZ has been earmarked for social infrastructure, despite the original plan requiring social infrastructure to be delivered for community. That 1 per cent includes premium gyms, crèches and medical centres, providing so-called 'social services' only to those who can afford to pay full commercial rates for them."

In March 2021, an updated application for the SDZ, primarily to provide for a new Liffey bridge, was rejected by An Bord Pleanala because it did not allow for enough height and density.

== Controversy ==
In February 2020, the High Court overturned permission granted by An Bord Pleanala for an increase in height of apartments from 7 to 13 stories at a site adjacent to Spencer Dock under development by Spencer Place Development Company and under the control of builder, Johnny Ronan. Dublin City Council had argued that the scheme for the SDZ only allowed heights of up to ten storeys. Crucially, it was also argued that an SDZ can only be amended through a process that includes "a fresh round of public consultation"; a process that would likely take several years to complete.

== See also ==
- Boland's Mill
- Capital Dock
- Dublin Docklands
- Dublin Landings
- Grand Canal Dock
- Point Village
- Silicon Docks
- Spencer Dock
