= Misery Hill =

Street in Dublin, Ireland

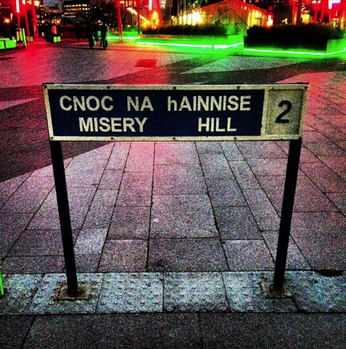
- Street sign on Misery Hill

- Location within Central Dublin Location within Dublin
- Native name: Cnoc na hAinnise (Irish)
- Namesake: Probably named for the public display of hanged corpses from Baggot Street's gallows
- Length: 160 m (520 ft)
- Location: Dublin, Ireland
- Postal code: D02
- Coordinates: 53°20′40″N 6°14′22″W
- West end: Macken Street, Hanover Street East
- East end: Forbes Street, Grand Canal Quay, Hanover Quay
- East: Hanover Quay
- West: Macken Street

Misery Hill (Irish: Cnoc na hAinnise) is a street in Dublin, Ireland, near Grand Canal Dock.

== Location ==
Misery Hill is located near Grand Canal Dock. It is partly a one way street leading from Macken Street to Grand Canal Square. It runs along the northern aspect of the Bord Gáis Energy Theatre.

== History ==
The most common theory of the origin of the name Misery Hill is related to the display of corpses of those hanged at Gallows Hill near Baggot Street on this street. Corpses could be left on display for up to 12 months. This practice was recorded as late as 1766, with the display of the corpses of two pirates being placed there. The practice ended with the opening of the College of Surgeons. In 1803, two associates of Robert Emmett, John Begg and James Byrne were hanged on Townsend Street, but some oral sources claimed they were executed on Misery Hill.

In medieval Dublin, during the 1200s, the area was a departure point for lepers leaving Ireland to go on pilgrimage to Camino de Santiago. The area between Misery Hill and Lazer Lane was occupied by a hospital for the pilgrims, dealing in basic first aid for those in lower social classes. The care provided was so basic as to be called "miserable", and this is another theory as to the etymology of Misery Hill. Architectural historian, Paul Clerkin asserts that those suffering from leprosy that could not gain admittance to the leper hospital at Hawkins Street would live in this area, at a remove from the main city.

In the 20th century, the area around Misery Hill was industrial, with stores, and a large gasometer on Sir John Rogerson's Quay. In the late 20th and early 21st century, the area was completely redeveloped as part of the wider Dublin Docklands. The headquarters of Facebook in Europe was on the corner of Misery Hill and Macken Street until 2023, when they moved to Ballsbridge.

== Literary influence ==
The poet David Wheatley's 2000 collection of poetry is entitled Misery Hill, with the street being the starting point for his Joycean inspired modern journey through Dublin.
