= Boyne Street =

Street in Dublin, Ireland

- Location within Central Dublin
- Native name: Sráid na Bóinne (Irish)
- Namesake: River Boyne and/or Battle of the Boyne
- Location: Dublin, Ireland
- Postal code: D02
- Coordinates: 53.3421°N 6.246385°W
- East: Erne Place Little
- West: Cumberland Street South

Boyne Street (Irish: Sráid na Bóinne) is a street in Dublin, Ireland.

== Location ==
Boyne Street runs from Cumberland Street South in the west to Erne Place Little in the east. It intersects with Sandwith Street Upper and Erne Street Upper.

== History ==
Boyne Street first appears on Dublin maps in 1770. A planned extension of the street as Great Boyne Street, which would have met the Grand Canal Dock and intersected Barrow Street, appears on an 1800 map but was never realised. It is thought it the street was named after the Battle of the Boyne, but given the proximity of Erne Street, it could be named for the River Boyne.

From 1922, the Dublin Corporation built a housing scheme on the street.

== Boyne Street Housing Scheme ==
Boyne Street was originally part of the Trinity Ward improvement scheme. However, Mr Cowan believed the site was too small and therefore would be more useful if it was extended up to South Cumberland Street, otherwise he believed that there would be no way of making an order for the 88 perches as originally conceived. The idea of extending the site was accepted, and the Housing Committee's Report (Report 232/1914) to the council, which dealt with an enlarged site, was approved on November 2, 1914. Due to the demolition of old and dangerous houses, there was an area of about two acres with some vacant plots which Cameron Duly made the required declaration of, on April 30, 1914. Prior to the housing scheme, there were 110 families living in 25 tenement buildings while there were 21 private houses. The housing scheme was for 42 three-roomed houses, two storeys high and 46 two-roomed flats, two storeys high which is a total of 88 dwellings at a density of 44 dwellings per acre. The scheme set out that each dwelling would have its own toilet, water supply and scullery. The total costs of the scheme was estimated at £22,075, £16,500 of which was building costs.

The clearance in Boyne street was very slow and had only been partially completed by 1920. In 1921, some houses were in very poor condition and needed urgent repair, so the decision was made to do a partial building programme on the section of the site at the junction of South Cumberland street and Boyne street (Report 192/1921). The LGB did not like the original plan for the layout of the houses and they decided to do a more simple design which incorporated more use of the streetscape. The corporation came up with their own design and hired G.L. O'Connor as an architect, although he was not happy that they came up with their own design and was not using his, he was still willing to get involved in the design and building process. There were 18 dwellings in this partial scheme, the houses are three-storey with the top two storeys being maisonettes, which according to the report was the first use of maisonettes in Dublin.

The cottages were to have a living room, two bedrooms, a kitchen and sanitary facilities, considering this it generated a lot of interest of tenders and nineteen were received, of which five were deemed reasonable by the architect, the final choice went to Fitzgerald and Leonard for under £11,000. The construction process was flawed and prolonged as people had to temporarily move house as their houses were demolished and reconstructed. A second phase followed and was completed by mid-1923 which increased the number of dwellings to 36, four of the blocks fronted Cumberland street and two-faced Boyne Street.

The final phase was approved in November 1923, it was for 42 dwellings with the same design however, the frontage was slightly wider which created an increase in room sizes (Report 354/1923). These houses still have their unique characteristics of red brick on the lower storeys with an emphasised door case and lintel. In recent years, the entrance to the maisonettes at the rear have been redesigned.
