= Bord Gáis Energy Theatre =

Ireland's largest all-seated indoor theatre

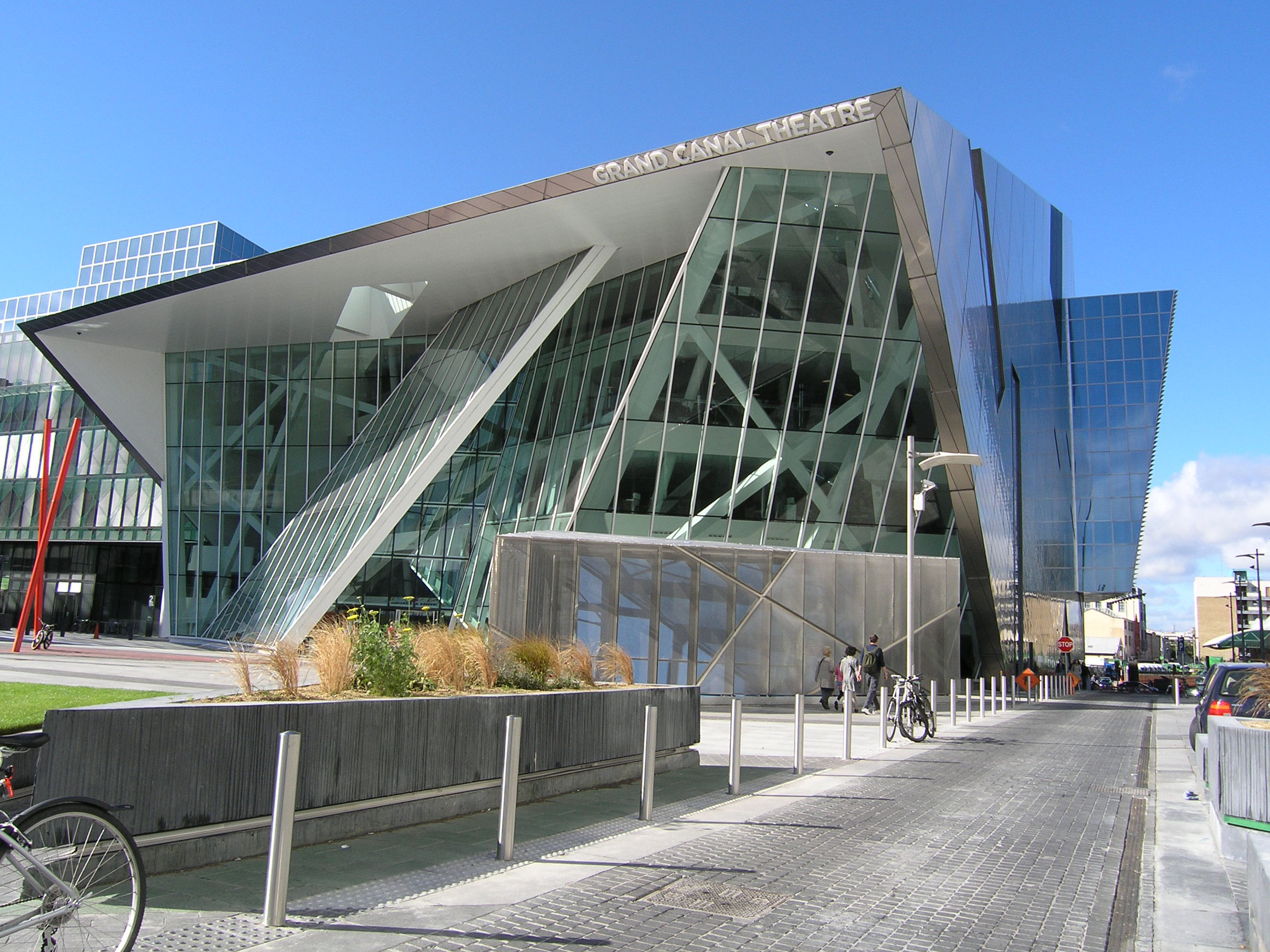
- Exterior venue with former signage (c.2010)

- Location within Dublin City
- Former names: Grand Canal Theatre (2010–12)
- Address: Grand Canal Square; Dublin 2 D02 PA03 Ireland
- Coordinates: 53.34425°N 6.24004°W
- Owner: Crownway Investments
- Operator: Live Nation Ireland
- Capacity: 2,111
- Acreage: 0.32 hectares (0.8 acres)
- Public transit: Grand Canal Dock DART

Construction
- Groundbreaking: 9 January 2007
- Opened: 18 March 2010
- Cost: €80 million
- Architects: RHWL; Studio Liebskind; McCauley Daye O'Connell Architects - Executive Architects
- Project manager: Lafferty
- Structural engineer: Arup Group
- Main contractor: Sisk Group

Website
- Venue Website
- Building details

Design and construction
- Developer: Chartered Land
- Other designers: Billings Design Associates; Martha Schwartz Partners; McCauley Daye O'Connell Architects; Pritchard Themis; Permasteelisa; Arts Team; Michael Slattery Associates; Bruce Shaw
- Quantity surveyor: Davis Langdon

The Bord Gáis Energy Theatre (originally the Grand Canal Theatre) is a performing arts venue, located in the Docklands of Dublin, Ireland. It is Ireland's largest fixed-seat theatre. It was designed by Daniel Libeskind for the DDDA, built by Joe O'Reilly (Chartered Land), and opened by Harry Crosbie on 18 March 2010. It is owned by Bernie and John Gallagher (of Doyle Hotels), who bought the theatre in 2014 from NAMA, through their company, Crownway.

== History ==
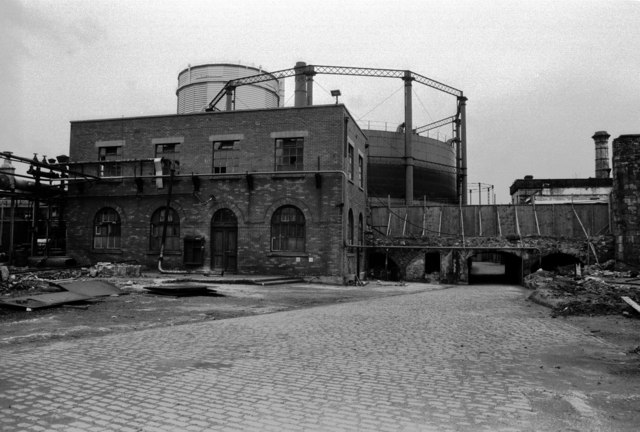
The site in 1985 prior to demolition

The site originally housed various buildings and structures of the Dublin Gasworks Company which were demolished in 1985 and decontaminated by the DDDA in the late 1990s and early 2000s at a cost of over €50M.

== Development (2004–2010) ==
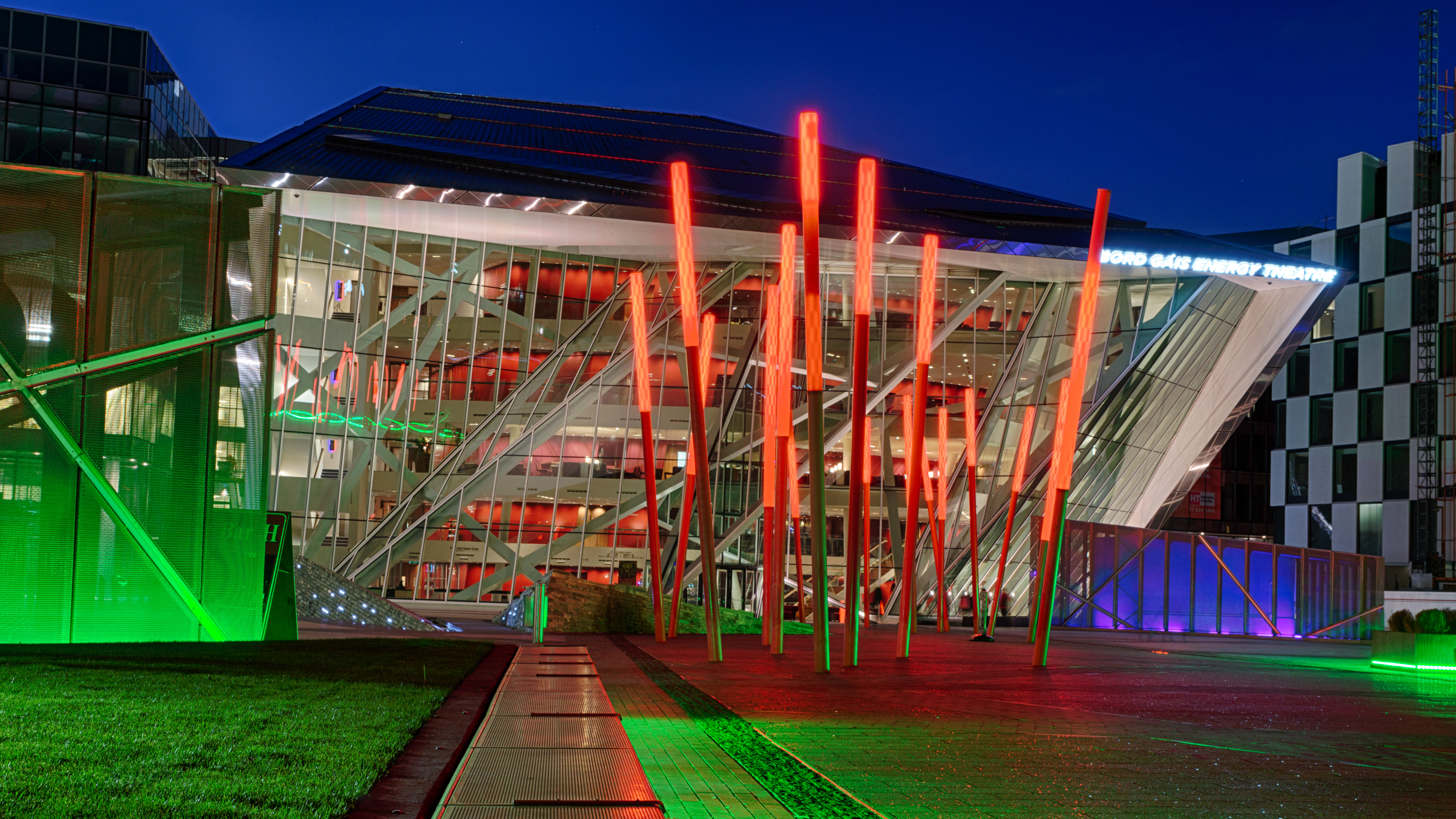
The front of the Daniel Libeskind designed Bord Gáis Energy Theatre pictured from the Martha Schwartz designed Grand Canal Square plaza

Grand Canal Theatre (13,765 ext. / 10,882 int. square metres, 2,111 seats) is the largest fixed seated theatre in Ireland, and the only Irish theatre with a stage capable of hosting major London West-End shows.

It would rank as the 4th largest London West-End theatre, and exceeds the capacity of all New York Broadway theatres.

The theatre was built by Joe O'Reilly of Chartered Land (Castlethorn), on a 0.32-hectare (0.8-acre) site, at a reported cost of €80 million (incl. land), to the specifications of the Dublin Docklands Development Authority (or "DDDA").

The cost of the theatre was funded by the sale of two sites, on either side of the theatre, that Joe O'Reilly purchased from the DDDA in 2006. Therefore, as well as the Grand Canal Theatre, O'Reilly built the south office block (2 Grand Canal Square at 14,000 m^{2} or 150,000 sq ft), and north office blocks (4 & 5 Grand Canal Square at 20,900 m^{2} or 225,000 sq ft), as well as a 222-space car-park (underneath the Grand Canal Square plaza).

Polish-American starchitect Daniel Libeskind designed the theatre for the DDDA in 2004 (who were regenerating the area). Studio Liebskind also designed the office blocks on either side of the theatre (2, 4 & 5 Grand Canal Square) to ensure O'Reilly's scheme was integrated. Studio Liebskind collaborated with RHWL architects in London (theatre specialists) and McCauley Daye O'Connell architects in Dublin (executive architects). Construction started on the theatre in January 2007 and finished in late 2009. The main contractor was John Sisk & Sons and Arup were the main engineers.

The DDDA's wider development of the Grand Canal Square (Grand Canal Dock regeneration project), included another office block (1 Grand Canal Square at 11,600 m^{2} or 125,000 sq ft, completed in 2007), a 5-star Hotel (the Manuel Aires Mateus designed, Marker Hotel, completed in 2012 but to a lower specification) and a Martha Schwartz designed 930-square-metre (10,000 sq ft) central piazza (on a "red carpet" theme, integrating with the Liebskind theatre, completed in 2008).

== Ownership (2010 onwards) ==
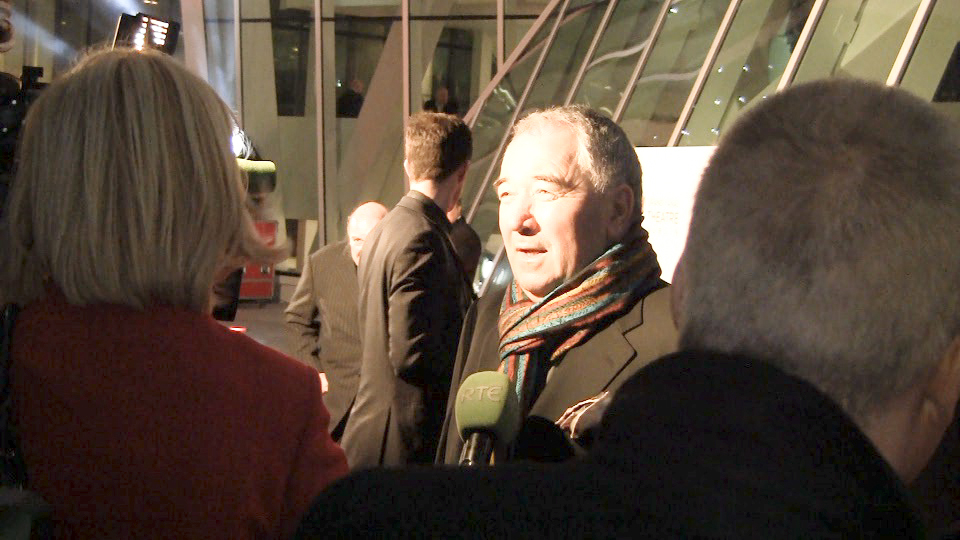
Owner Harry Crosbie at the opening night of the theatre on 18 March 2010

As construction began in January 2007, the DDDA reportedly proposed the Grand Canal Theatre to the State (Department of Arts and Culture) or the Abbey Theatre, or as a new venue for National Concert Hall, but neither were able to meet the cost of fit-out (c. €4M), or handle the scale of the venue.

The theatre was purchased by Dublin Docklands-based businessman Harry Crosbie (co-owner of Point Theatre, now 3Arena, amongst other docklands properties) for €10m in July 2007 from Joe O'Reilly. Crosbie borrowed the purchase price, plus another €3.8M for the fit-out, from Allied Irish Banks ("AIB").

Crosbie then leased the management contract for the Grand Canal Theatre to Live Nation (who were also co-owners, and managers, of the 3Arena).

Crosbie officially opened the Grand Canal Theatre with a performance of Swan Lake by the Russian State Ballet of Siberia on 18 March 2010.

The Grand Canal Theatre was formally renamed the Bord Gáis Energy Theatre on 7 March 2012 as part of a 6.5-year naming rights deal with Bord Gáis Energy worth a reported €4.5 million (or €700k per year). The naming-rights deal was renewed in 2018, until the end of 2026.

The theatre was put into receivership by the NAMA in April 2013. Crosbie's AIB theatre loans had been transferred to NAMA, however, Crosbie had larger loans with NAMA on various docklands projects (e.g. Point Village). He unsuccessfully fought the foreclosure by NAMA's receiver, Grant Thornton.

Grant Thornton took control of the theatre for NAMA, however Live Nation continued to manage the venue and support the sales process with CBRE.

The theatre was sold in September 2014 on behalf of Grant Thornton for €28M (twice what Crosbie paid in 2007, and 40% above CBRE's €20M asking), to Bernie and John Gallagher (of Doyle Hotels), one of Ireland's richest hotel couples. They had not previously owned a theatre or concert venue.

LiveNation remain as venue managers (not clear if this is Harry Crosbie's original lease or a new management agreement with Bernie and John Gallagher).

== Operational performance ==
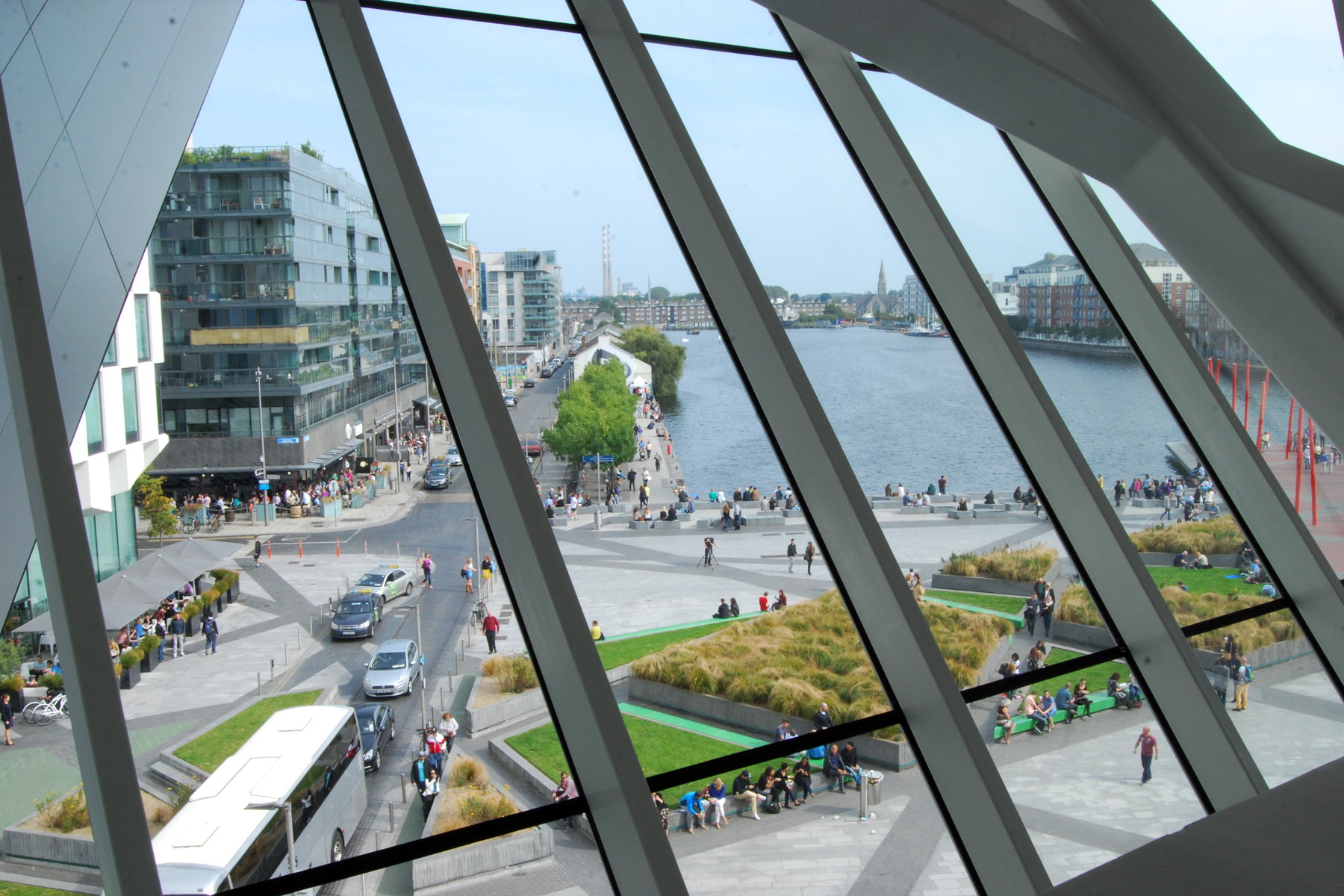
View out from inside the theatre

Filed accounts (including 2014 CBRE sales materials), indicate that the Bord Gáis Energy Theatre:

- sells circa half a million tickets per year;
- hosts circa 330 events per year (including afternoon and evening shows), close to busiest UK theatres of 350 per year;
- 70% of events are described as West-End musicals, and 20% are described as West-End theatre;
- makes circa €8m in revenues per year (tickets, food and beverage, venue hire and naming rights)
- makes circa €1.5m in EBITDA, and circa €1m in pre-tax profit (there is some ambiguity over the definition of EBITDA and pre-tax profit).

== Events ==
=== Productions ===
As per above, the Bord Gáis Energy theatre imply that circa 90% of the events are West-End musicals and West-End theatre shows.

The following West End shows have been shown in the theatre:

- Wicked (2013, 2018 and 2024)
- The Lion King (2013, 2022, 2023)
- Blood Brothers (2014)
- Dirty Dancing (2014 and 2023)
- War Horse (2013)
- Miss Saigon (2017)
- Les Misérables (2018–2019)
- Kinky Boots (2019)
- The Book of Mormon (2021)
- Hamilton (2024)

The following other notable performances have been shown in the theatre:

- In March 2010, the theatre hosted a performance of Swan Lake by the Russian State Ballet of Siberia on 18 March 2010.
- Also in March 2010, the theatre hosted a classical Chinese dance performance Shen Yun by Shen Yun Performing Arts on 28 March 2010.
- In September 2014, TEDxDublin was held in the theatre.
- In March 2016, the theatre hosted 'RTÉ Centenary', a concert for television to mark the one hundredth anniversary of the 1916 Rising.
- In 2022, it hosted Carmen starring Paula Murrihy.

=== Performers ===
- Samantha Mumba
- The Beach Boys
- Robert Plant
- Josh Groban
- Tony Bennett
- Gavin James
- Incubus
- Leo Sayer
- Marti Pellow
- Suede
- David Gray
- Josh Ritter
- Maroon 5
- Jedward
- Tori Amos
- Alexandra Burke
- Norah Jones
- Kraftwerk
- Damien Rice
- Opeth
- Conor Oberst
- The Waterboys
- Janet Jackson
- Why Don't We
- Rebecca Storm
- Idina Menzel

== See also ==
- Dublin Docklands Development Authority
- Daniel Libeskind
- Martha Schwartz
- Grand Canal Docks
- West End theatre
- Broadway theatre
- Bord Gais Energy
