= Dublin Docklands Development Authority =

Irish government agency

The Dublin Docklands Development Authority (Irish: Údarás Forbartha Dugthailte Bhaile Átha Cliath) (DDDA) was created by the Dublin Docklands Development Authority Act 1997 to lead a major project of physical, social and economic regeneration in the East side of Dublin, Ireland, along both banks of the River Liffey.

== History ==
The Dublin Docklands Development Authority was established in 1997 under the Dublin Docklands Development Authority Act 1997. The Dublin Docklands master plan was published in 1997.

The stated mission of the DDDA was to 'develop the Dublin Docklands into a world-class city quarter paragon of sustainable inner city regeneration – one in which the whole community enjoys the highest standards of access to education, employment, housing and social amenity and which delivers a major contribution to the social and economic prosperity of Dublin and the whole of Ireland'.

The authority was due to work until 2012 on the development of the area and manage the investment of €7bn from both public and private sources.

The Irish Government had intended to pass legislation to abolish the authority in 2013 and transfer its powers and assets to the Dublin City Council, but this was delayed.

The broad remit of the authority included social regeneration, which in practical terms resulted in the building of over 11,000 new homes. They also managed several events each year, including the Docklands Fun Run, which started from Grand Canal Dock.

Among the more famous projects it was responsible for overseeing were the Spencer Dock development, the Point Village (which ran into financial difficulties and was taken over by NAMA), and the proposed U2 Tower (which was abandoned).

=== Winding up ===
On 31 May 2012, the Irish government announced its intention to wind up the Dublin Docklands Development Authority. The decision followed the publication of a special report on the DDDA by the Comptroller and Auditor General, which contained "damning findings about the authority's conduct".

The Minister for the Environment, Community and Local Government Phil Hogan, who was responsible for the DDDA, said the Government remained fully committed to the continued regeneration of the Dublin Docklands. However, he said that taking account of several reports published about the DDDA, keeping the authority on a standalone basis was no longer viable, financially or otherwise. The authority was to remain in place for a transitional period of up to 18 months under a new board chaired by the then Dublin city manager John Tierney, later chief executive of Irish Water. In November 2013, Phil Hogan announced that he had asked the board to remain in place for an indefinite period. The city council took control of the authority's planning functions by November 2013.

On 10 June 2014, the Dublin Business Forum decided that the dissolution plan would be postponed due to the disengagement of the DDDA leading up to the planned dissolution date of May 2014. There were three main issues:

- Failure to acknowledge the enterprise as the key driver of Docklands success
- Unclear terms of reference for the membership of the Docklands Consultative Forum
- Lack of transparency in the transfer of the remaining cash and related assets

The authority was fully dissolved on 1 March 2016, under the Dublin Docklands Development Authority (Dissolution) Act 2015 with its assets and powers being transferred to Dublin City Council.

== Glass Bottle Plant losses ==
In November 2006, a consortium headed by property developer Bernard McNamara, and including financier Derek Quinlan and the Dublin Docklands Development Authority paid €412m for the 25 acres former Irish Glass Bottle site in Ringsend in Dublin. However the development never went ahead and the land – which ultimately cost €431 million when the price of acquisition, stamp duty and other costs is included – was valued in 2011 at €45 million. A special report on the DDDA by the Comptroller and Auditor General found that the authority failed to get an independent valuation of the site before committing to the deal, a move which ultimately cost the authority €52 million.

== See also ==
- Post-2008 Irish economic downturn
- Docklands Strategic Development Zone
- Dublin Docklands
- Spencer Dock
- Point Village
- Grand Canal Dock
- Ringsend
