= North Wall, Dublin =

Northern inner district of Dublin, Ireland

North Wall Port Thuaidh (Irish)
- Area
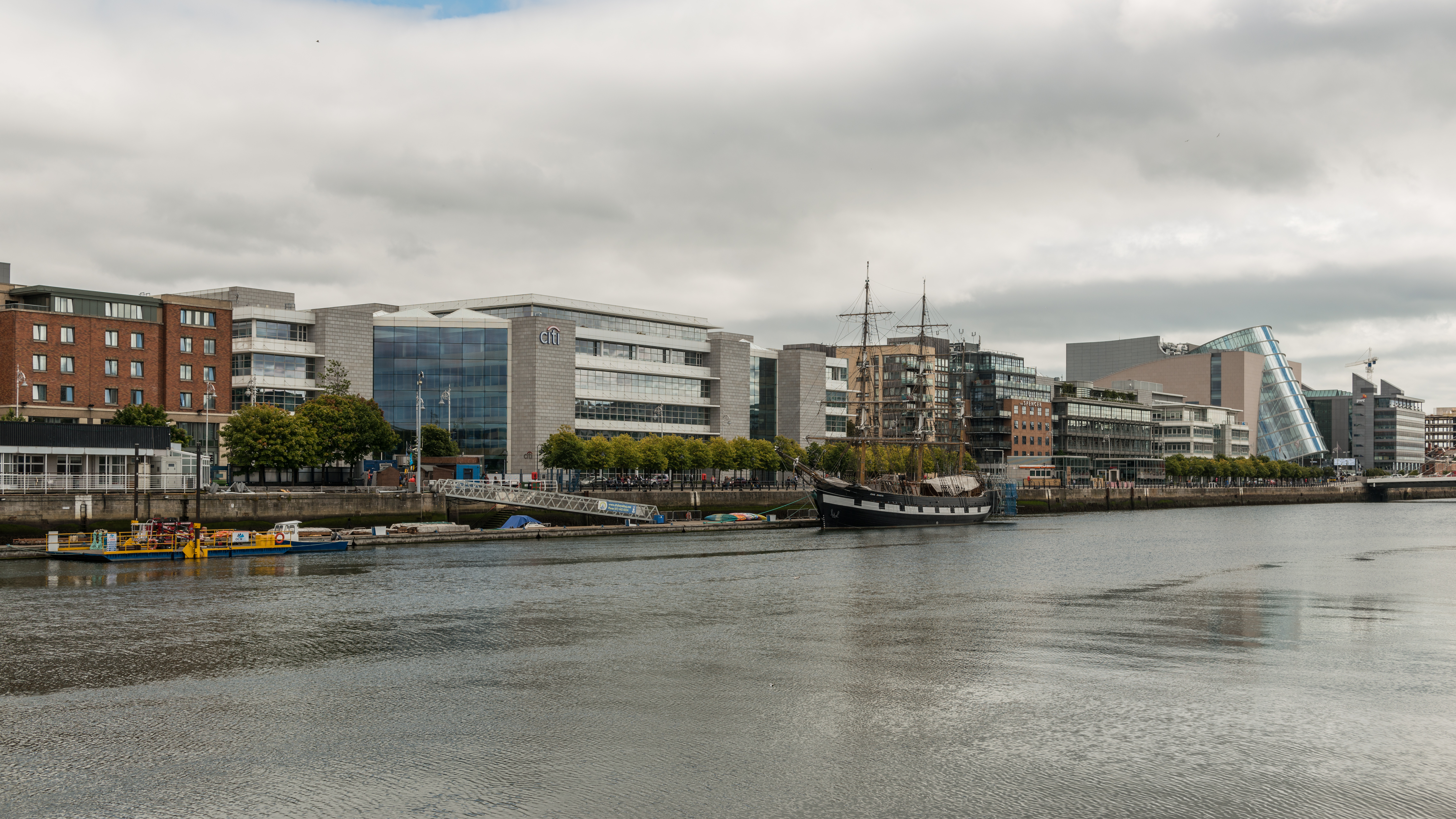
- North Wall Quay in 2015

- Location in Dublin
- Coordinates: 53°20′56″N 6°14′23″W
- Country: Ireland
- Province: Leinster
- County: County Dublin
- Local authority: Dublin City Council
- Elevation: 29 m (95 ft)

North Wall (Irish: Port Thuaidh) is an area east of the inner north side of Dublin, along the River Liffey where it forms one of the Dublin quays.

The name refers to the North Bull Wall, which was constructed to form Dublin Port, extend the Liffey estuary and reclaim land at various stages from the early 1700s until its final completion around 1825. The area is today used to refer to the area between Sheriff Street and the River Liffey.

It contains the entire north side of Dublin Docklands and includes the International Financial Services Centre, Spencer Dock, and further east, the main part of Dublin Port.

== History ==
The North Lotts area was mainly created between 1717 and 1729 after Dublin Corporation had, earlier in 1717-18, drawn lots and distributed the land between themselves in this manner. By around 1750, the area had been fully reclaimed and was no longer overflowed by seawater at high tide. John Roque's map of 1756 shows the areas of present day East Wall and North Wall fully embanked and divided into plots of land. Present day streets Mayor Street, Wapping Street, Guild Street, Commons Street, Sheriff Street and Fish Street (now Castleforbes Road) can all be seen and are named while in East Wall, Church Road, West Road and East Road are also noted. East Wall Road is at that time referred to as "East Quay".

The street names of the North lotts corresponded with various positions or concepts within Dublin Corporation and the City Assembly of Dublin including the Sheriff of Dublin City (Sheriff Street), the Lord Mayor of Dublin (Mayor Street), Guilds of the City of Dublin (Guild Street) and the Common Council or the "commons" (Commons Street).

The newly reclaimed area is separated from the rest of Dublin by the Strand Road, today referred to as North Strand, although no longer a strand.

=== Castleforbes ===
The Castleforbes area of North Wall is believed to refer to a house built in the area around 1729 by George Forbes, 3rd Earl of Granard, who was Lord Mayor of Dublin in 1720 and was a reference to their family seat of Castle Forbes, County Longford.

Later, the Castleforbes site was acquired by Lever Brothers and was where they it developed its main Dublin factory in 1927 on the site of what was previously the manufactory of the Dublin Glass Bottle Company.

=== Modern North Wall ===
The area is dominated by a combination of new apartment blocks and offices, many created through the Docklands Strategic Development Zone Planning Scheme, as well as older dockers' housing and dockland and recreational activities.

Large developments in the area include Spencer Dock, Dublin Landings and the Point Village.

Transport in the area includes the Dublin Area Rapid Transit (Docklands railway station on Sheriff Street), the LUAS (red line stations George's Dock, Mayor Square, Spencer Dock, and The Point, and 8 dublinbikes stations.

== See also ==
- Spencer Dock
- 3Arena
- Dublin Docklands
- Docklands Strategic Development Zone
