= Grand Canal Dock =

Docklands area east of Dublin city centre, Ireland

Coordinates: 53.343497°N 6.23762°W

Grand Canal Dock Duga na Canálach Móire
- Area
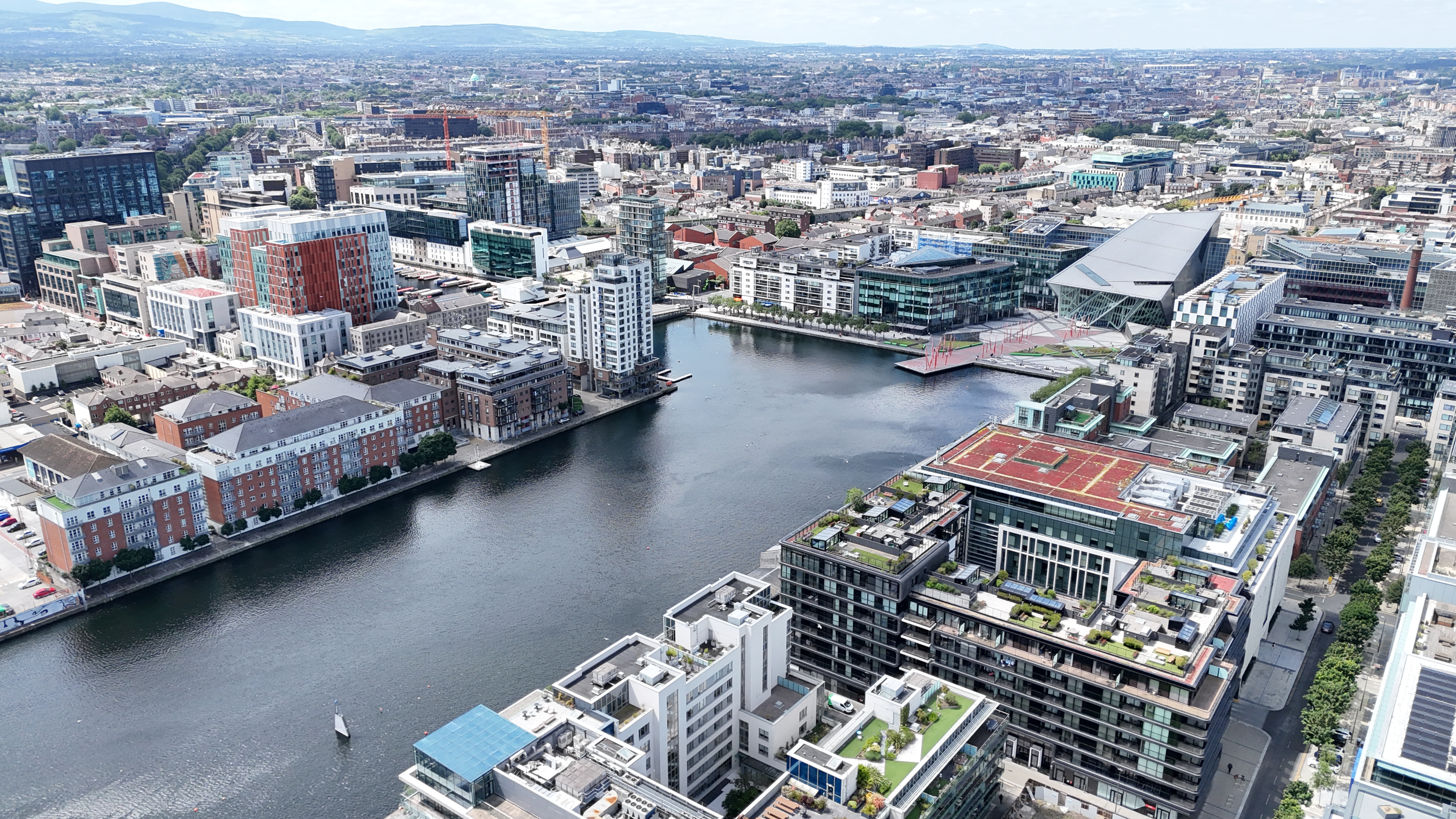
- View of Grand Canal Square and the Theatre
- Interactive map of Grand Canal Dock
- Ireland: Ireland
- County: Dublin
- Local authority: Dublin City Council
- Local Electoral Area: South East Inner City
- Dáil Constituency: Dublin Bay South
- Time zone: Irish Standard Time
- Postal District: D02, D04
- Geocode: IE

Grand Canal Dock (Irish: Duga na Canálach Móire) is an urban area on the Southside of Dublin, Ireland. It is located on the border of eastern Dublin 2 and the westernmost part of Ringsend in Dublin 4, surrounding the Grand Canal Docks, an enclosed harbour where the Grand Canal meets the River Liffey. The area has undergone significant redevelopment since 2000, as part of the Dublin Docklands area redevelopment project.

The area has become a tech hub, serving as a popular location for multinational technology firms such as Google, Facebook, Twitter, LinkedIn, and Airbnb; technology firms employed about 7,000 people in the area by 2015. The area has been the subject of debate over the balance of development and gentrification. It has been referred to as Silicon Docks (a reference to Silicon Valley), a nickname which has been the subject of derision over its clichéd nature.

== Location ==
There is no precise definition of the Grand Canal Dock area, but it is generally understood to be bounded by the Liffey to the north, South Lotts Road to the east (or Barrow Street if separating South Lotts as its own area), Grand Canal Street to the south, and Macken Street to the west (although some maps show the area including as far west as the corner of Leeson Street and Fitzwilliam Place). Grand Canal Dock contains Grand Canal Dock railway station and the national Waterways Ireland Visitor Centre.

=== Access ===
Grand Canal Dock railway station, accessed from Barrow Street, opened in 2001 (although the line has been in use since 1834). In early 2014, five new Dublin Bikes stations were opened in the area.

== History ==
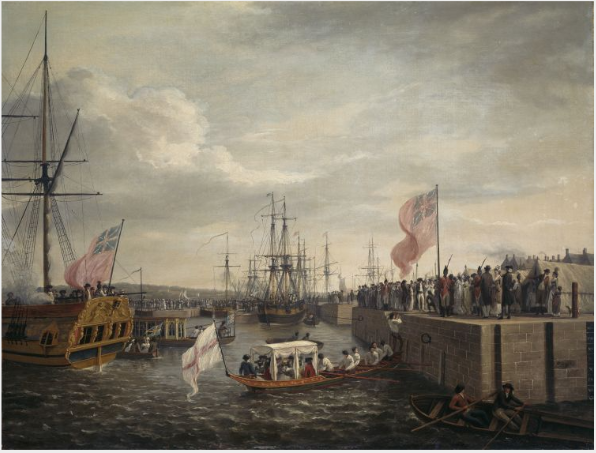
Opening of the Ringsend Docks, Dublin, 23 April 1796

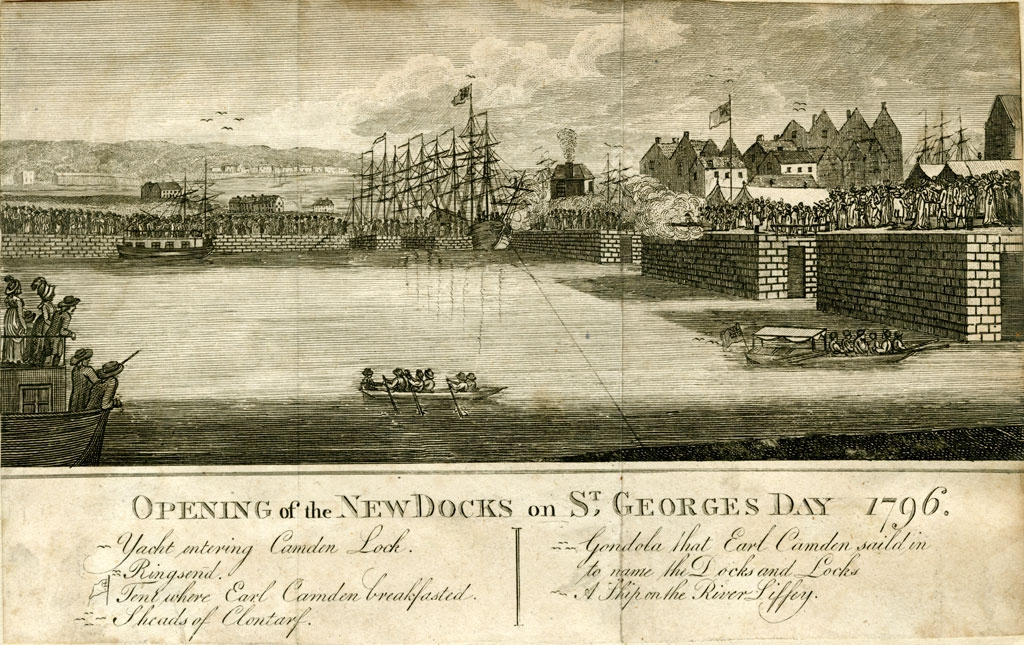
Opening of the Ringsend Docks, Dublin, 23 April 1796

The Grand Canal Docks first opened in 1796, built to a design by William Jessop. Before this development, from medieval times the area was associated with lepers, as recorded in some of the street names such as Misery Hill and Lazer Lane. At the time they were the world's largest docks. They fell into decline within just a few decades, due mostly to reduced canal usage with the arrival of the railways. The landscape was dominated by Dublin Gas Company's mountains of black coal, along with chemical factories, tar pits, bottle factories and iron foundries. However, bakers and millers maintained business along the southern edge of the inner basin. By the 1960s, the Grand Canal Docks were almost completely derelict.

=== Regeneration ===
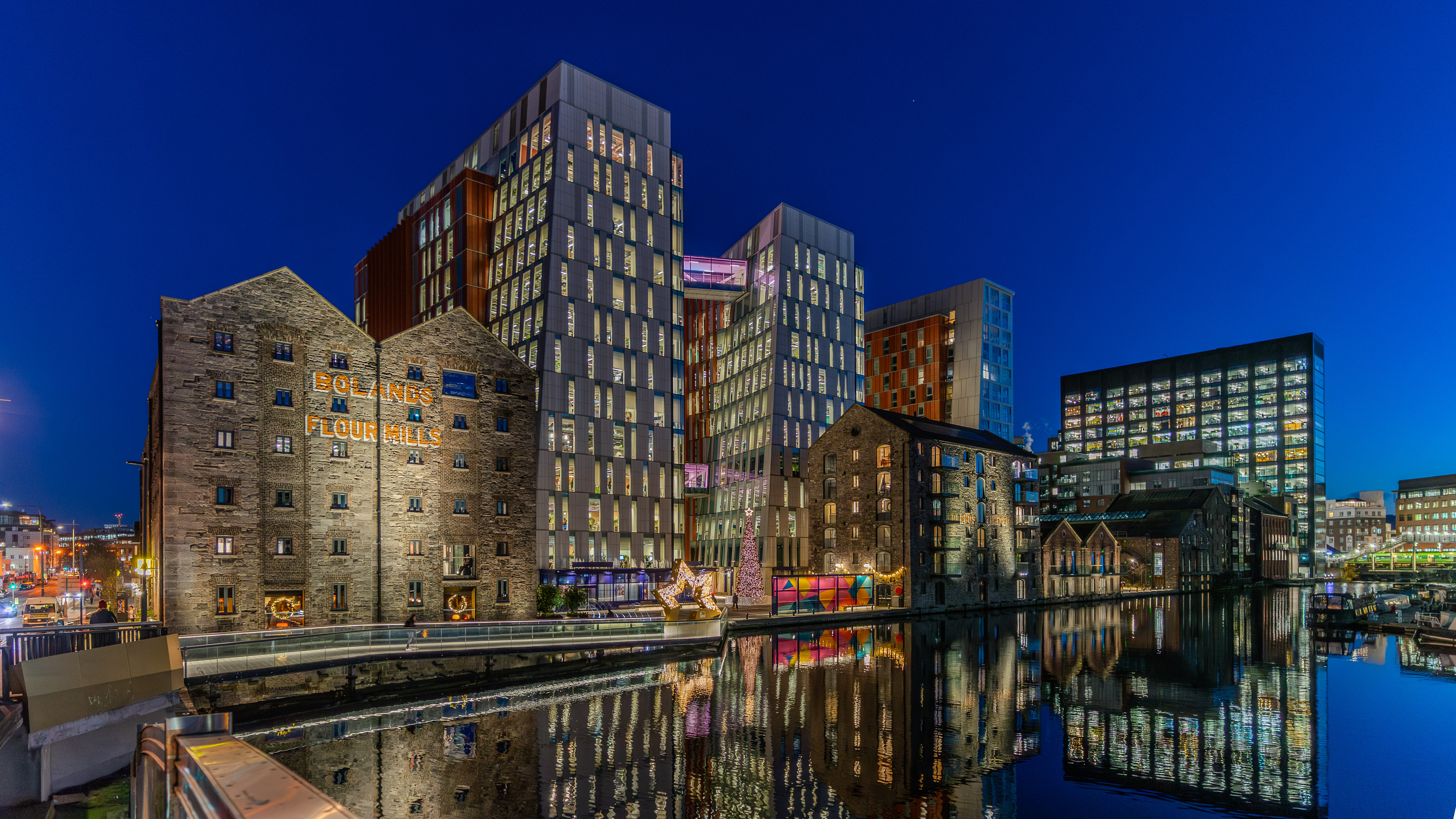
The recently renovated Boland's Mills mixed-use development, including several 19th century warehouses.

Around 1987 it was decided that Hanover Quay was too toxic to sell. Regeneration began in 1998, when Bord Gáis sold the Dublin Docklands Development Authority (DDDA) the former gasworks site located in the area between Sir John Rogerson's Quay and Hanover Quay, for €19 million. The DDDA spent €52 million decontaminating the land, even though the likely return was estimated at just €40 million. The decontamination took place under the supervision of the Environmental Protection Agency, between 2002 and 2006. The process involved constructing an underground wall eight metres deep around the affected area, and the contaminated soil being dug out and removed. By the time the decontamination was finished, an inflated property bubble and increased demand in the area (brought on, in part, by the decision by Google to set up its European headquarters nearby), allowed the authority to sell the land for €300 million. The DDDA injected some of its new funds into the area's infrastructure including seats, street lighting, and civic spaces.

In the wake of the dot-com bubble collapse from 1999 to 2001, IDA Ireland's director of operations in California, Dermot Tuohy, made moves to bring the at-the-time budding tech companies, PayPal, eBay, Overture (which would later become part of Yahoo!), and Google to Dublin. In 2002, Google executives agreed to investigate the possibility of opening operations in Dublin.

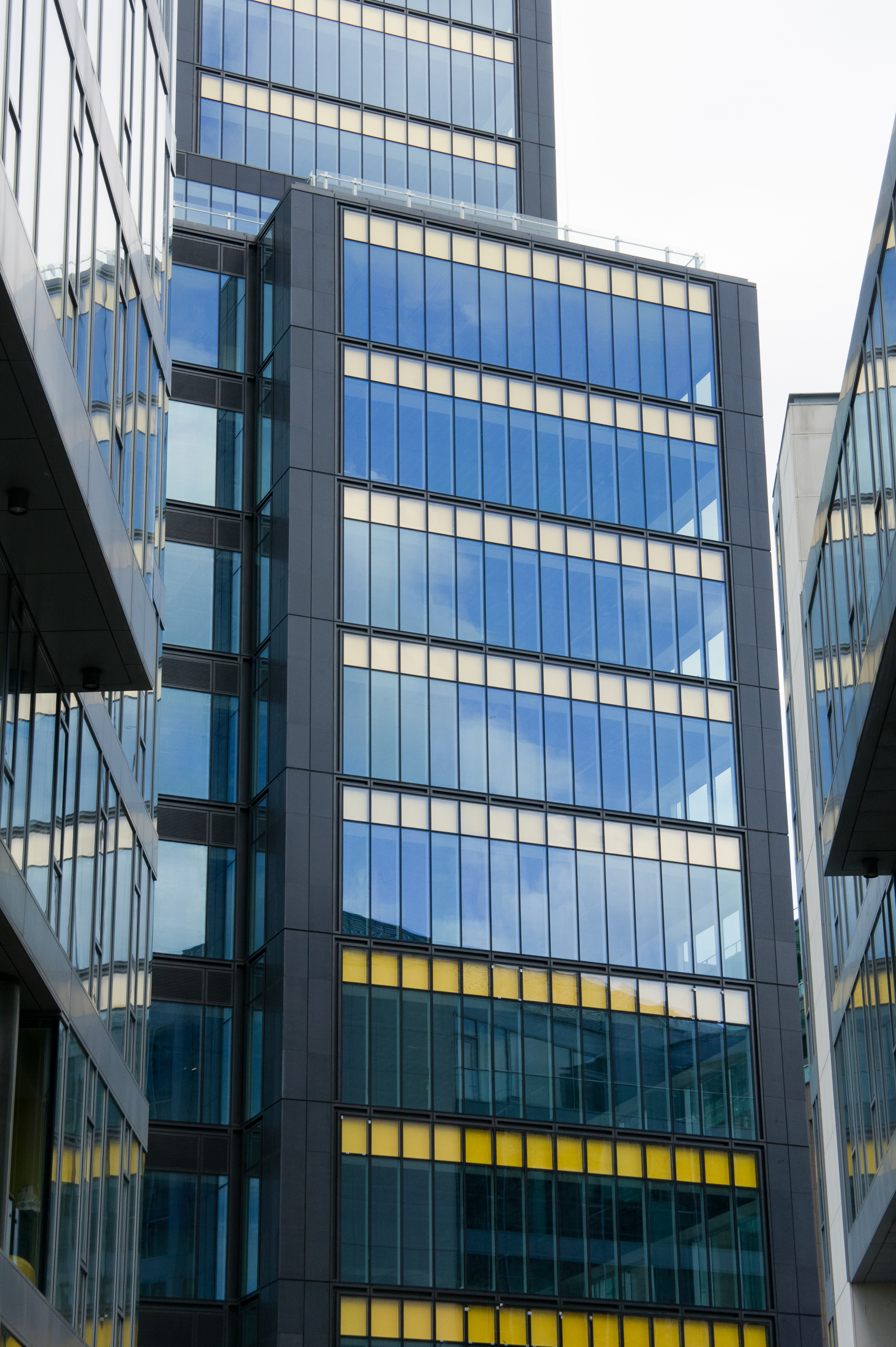
Google's European headquarters, the Montevetro building

They viewed the Digital Hub in the city centre west, which now houses 900 people and is the location for the European headquarters of companies such as Eventbrite and Etsy. Google's property advisors at the time also alerted them to an alternative location at Grand Canal Dock, identifying the potential of a number of buildings on Barrow Street owned by developer Liam Carroll. Within walking distance from the city centre, the location was seen by the company as having the right mix of factors to attract the type of employee they wanted in Dublin. Google's California offices encouraged a college campus-style atmosphere, something achievable in the Grand Canal Dock location. The visitors decided that once the building, which was still under construction, was complete, they would rent 60,000sq ft of Gordon House on Barrow Street, which they moved into in 2004. It was a choice subsequently seen by those in the IDA as a seismic shift for investment in Dublin. The agency, and many others including senior Google employees, felt the decision was directly responsible for many other Silicon Valley names, such as Twitter and Facebook, choosing to set up shop nearby.

Many of the new buildings around Grand Canal Dock were completed in 2007, just before the 2008 financial crisis. This meant that many of these high-end buildings stood empty in the period of economic uncertainty that followed. Since 2012 in the wake of Ireland's economic recovery, international investors began buying prime office space in the area.

In November 2013, a new fast-track planning scheme was approved by Dublin City Council to allow for docklands buildings of up to 22 floors in height – 50% higher than Dublin's tallest building at the time. The Docklands Strategic Development Zone (SDZ) Planning Scheme gave council planners the power to make decisions that cannot be appealed to An Bord Pleanála, eliminating a source of potential delays for developers. The SDZ represented the first major planning initiative since the 2012 decision to wind up the Docklands Authority, but to retain an appropriate fast track planning framework to complete the Docklands project. Dublin City Council, which took over the Docklands Authority's powers, was determined to encourage the continued development of the 66 hectares, north and south of the river, that comprised the new planning zone. The plan identified five specific development hubs: Spencer Dock, Point Village, Grand Canal Dock, Britain Quay and Boland's Mill. One-third of the overall docklands area – 22 hectares – was earmarked for development. Buildings left uncompleted since the 2008 financial crisis were since completed. Most notably, the former Anglo Irish Bank building, the unfinished skeleton of which was an icon of the 2008 financial crisis, was finished in 2017 by its new owner, the Central Bank of Ireland.

The housing crisis in Dublin, and the marked increase in the cost of living, put pressure on tech firms to retain staff in the Silicon Docks area. Many of such companies began to look elsewhere in Ireland to establish offices where the cost of living is more affordable.

== Sites control and planning ==
On 22 May 2014, it was announced that a fast-track planning process was approved by An Bord Pleanala, with 366,000 square metres of office space and 2,600 homes to be developed across 22 hectares of land in the North Lotts and Grand Canal Dock areas under the Docklands Strategic Development Zone (SDZ) planning scheme. A number of site plan notices were posted in the area including the following:

- On 14 October 2014, it was reported that U2 would buy 16 Hanover Quay from the Dublin Docklands Development Authority for €450,000. The authority had forced the band to sell its old riverfront studio on Hanover Quay for an undisclosed price in 2002 to allow the development of the Grand Canal Harbour area. As part of that deal, the authority had promised the band the top two floors of the 32-storey tower it was planning to build on an adjacent quay, a project that was subsequently put on hold. In light of its imminent dissolution and the recent approval by An Bord Plenala for the North Lotts and Grand Canal Planning scheme, the authority decided it would not be proceeding with a proposed compulsory purchase order of 16 and 18 Hanover Quay.
- On 4 December 2014, a site plan notice was posted describing the developments to take place at the Boland's Mill site including retaining and restoring old stone buildings to accommodate retail/restaurant/cafe use, cultural/exhibition use, and residences; and the construction of three new towers (13 to 15 storeys, maximum height 53.65m) to accommodate offices and residences. The notice stated that three new pedestrian routes from Barrow Street, and a new civic waterfront square adjacent to the dock would be created.
- On 12 December 2014, two site plan notices were posted for Targeted Investment Opportunities PLC describing the developments to take place at the former Kilsaran Concrete site at 5 Hanover Quay. One notice was for the construction of a 7-storey office building. The other notice was for the construction of a 7-8 storey building to accommodate residences and mixed-use, including 100 apartments, a leisure centre, and space for 1 retail and 2 cafes at ground level.

== Development ==
While it has been reported that the reasons behind the development of Silicon Docks are 'scarce' or 'challenging', three areas are generally focused on, including corporate tax incentive, human capital, and seed funding.

=== Corporate tax incentive ===
Ireland's low corporate tax rate—just 12.5%--has long attracted entrepreneurs and was once the country's key selling point for foreign business owners. However, the tax implications that companies face in major deals have been described as an "impediment". The headline rate of Capital Gains Tax ('CGT') was 33% as of August 2019.

=== Human capital ===
In 2012, Citibank's annual list of most competitive cities in the world ranked Dublin as the city with the best "human capital." The city is home to dozens of colleges and universities, including Dublin City University, Trinity College Dublin, University College Dublin, and Technological University Dublin.

The local talent pool has received a boost from Google, which opened its Dublin headquarters in 2002 and has since been recruiting highly trained tech talent from all around the world, thanks to Ireland's lenient work visa process. As of 2015, Google employs some 3,500 people in Dublin. Facebook, LinkedIn, Fleetmatics and Twitter, among others, employ hundreds more.

=== Seed funding ===
The Competitive Start Fund of Enterprise Ireland invests in 15 seed-stage start-ups every quarter. There are also other accelerators in the city offering start-ups much-needed seed funding, including Launchpad. However, Prof Vinny Cahill, Dean of Research and computer science lecturer at Trinity College Dublin, explained in 2012, "There is definitely a growing venture capital community here. But if you look at Silicon Valley, there's a network of people who have been through the business and who encourage investment. It's starting to evolve in Dublin, but we're not at Silicon Valley's level yet."

== "Silicon Docks" nickname ==
The name Silicon Docks first appeared in 2011 as the area made a comeback amidst economic recovery after the projects were left unfinished during the 2008 financial crisis. Since then, the term appeared in several articles by various media sources as well as Google Dublin's homepage. A book titled Silicon Docks: The Rise of Dublin as a Global Tech Hub by Pamela Newenham was published by Liberties Press in January 2015. Other nicknames for the area include the Google Basin.

== Buildings ==
Several of the buildings surrounding Grand Canal Square, such as the Bord Gáis Energy Theatre, The Marker Hotel, and the HQ office development, were designed by McCauley Daye O’Connell Architects. Notable features of the Grand Canal Dock area include:

=== Grand Canal Square ===
Grand Canal Square Square was completed in 2008. The €8 million plaza consists of red resin-glass paving that juts out into the water, dotted with illuminated red poles. Planted sections are arranged diagonally across the square.

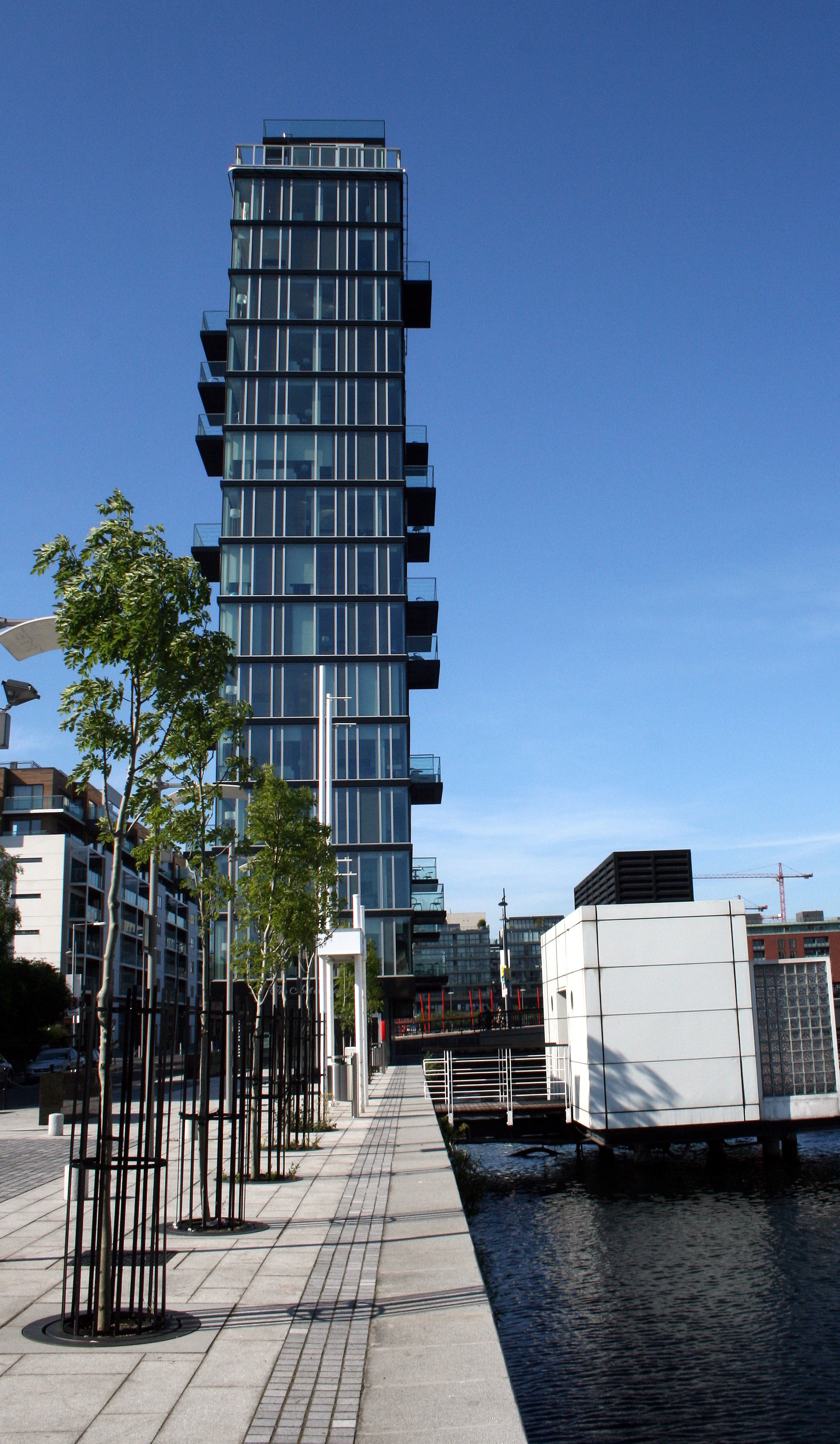
Alto Vetro (2008), and the National Waterways Visitor Centre

=== Alto Vetro ===
The Alto Vetro apartment building was awarded the Royal Institute of the Architects of Ireland’s (RIAI) Silver Medal for Housing (2007-2008). It was built by the Montevetro developers Treasury Holdings. It has 16 floors and is 51 Meters tall

=== Boland's Mills ===
Boland's Mills was a functioning mill until 2001, after which the site, including older stone buildings and taller concrete silos, became derelict. The site underwent a €150 million reconstruction accommodating new residences, commercial, retail, and civic spaces.

=== Bord Gáis Energy Theatre ===
The Bord Gáis Energy Theatre is the largest theatre in Ireland. It was designed by Polish-American architect Daniel Liebeskind. It was opened as the Grand Canal Theatre in 2010 but renamed in March 2012 as part of a paid naming rights agreement.

=== The Factory ===
The Factory houses Irish Film and Television Network studios, as well as rehearsal and recording studios where a number of U2's albums were recorded.

=== Google Docks ===
The Montevetro building completed in 2010 stands at a height of 66 metres and is one of the tallest commercial building in Dublin. It was sold to Google in January 2011 and subsequently renamed "Google Docks". In 2014, the Google Docks building was joined by the "Hyperlink" bridge - an "iconic" curving three-pronged steel and transparent glass footbridge to Google's two office buildings across Barrow Street - Gordon House and Gasworks House..

=== The Marker Hotel ===
The Marker Hotel is owned by development firm Tetrarch Capital and is one of only six of The Leading Hotels of the World in Ireland. It was designed in 2004 by Portuguese architect Manuel Aires Mateus. It opened in 2013 and offers the city's first rooftop terrace and bar.

=== Millennium Tower ===
Millennium Tower is an apartment building located on the Grand Canal outer basin, 49 metres in height.

=== No. 2, 4, and 5 Grand Canal Square ===
The modern office buildings alongside the Bord Gáis Energy Theatre were designed by architect Daniel Liebeskind and developed by Chartered Land. No 2 houses offices for Capita Asset Services & William Fry Solicitors. No 4 houses offices for Facebook's European headquarters.

== Tech companies located in Silicon Docks ==
The following is a list of just some of the tech companies located in the Silicon Docks area, divided into geographical areas.

Grand Canal Dock/Grand Canal Square

- Google
- Facebook
- Accenture
- Airbnb
- TripAdvisor
- Indeed
- Squarespace
- Pinterest
- Tenable
- Salesforce
- Zalando

City centre east/IFSC

- Arista Networks
- Twitter
- HubSpot
- Dogpatch Labs

City centre south/Grand Canal

- Jet.com (closed)
- Amazon.com
- LinkedIn
- Dropbox
- SurveyMonkey
- Groupon
- Yelp
- Nitro
- Wrike
- Zendesk
- Asana
- MongoDB
- Stripe
- ActiveCampaign

== Gallery ==
View of the west inner basin from the top floor of the Montevetro building. The now-regenerated Boland's Mill, Alto Vetro, and The Marker Hotel can be seen.

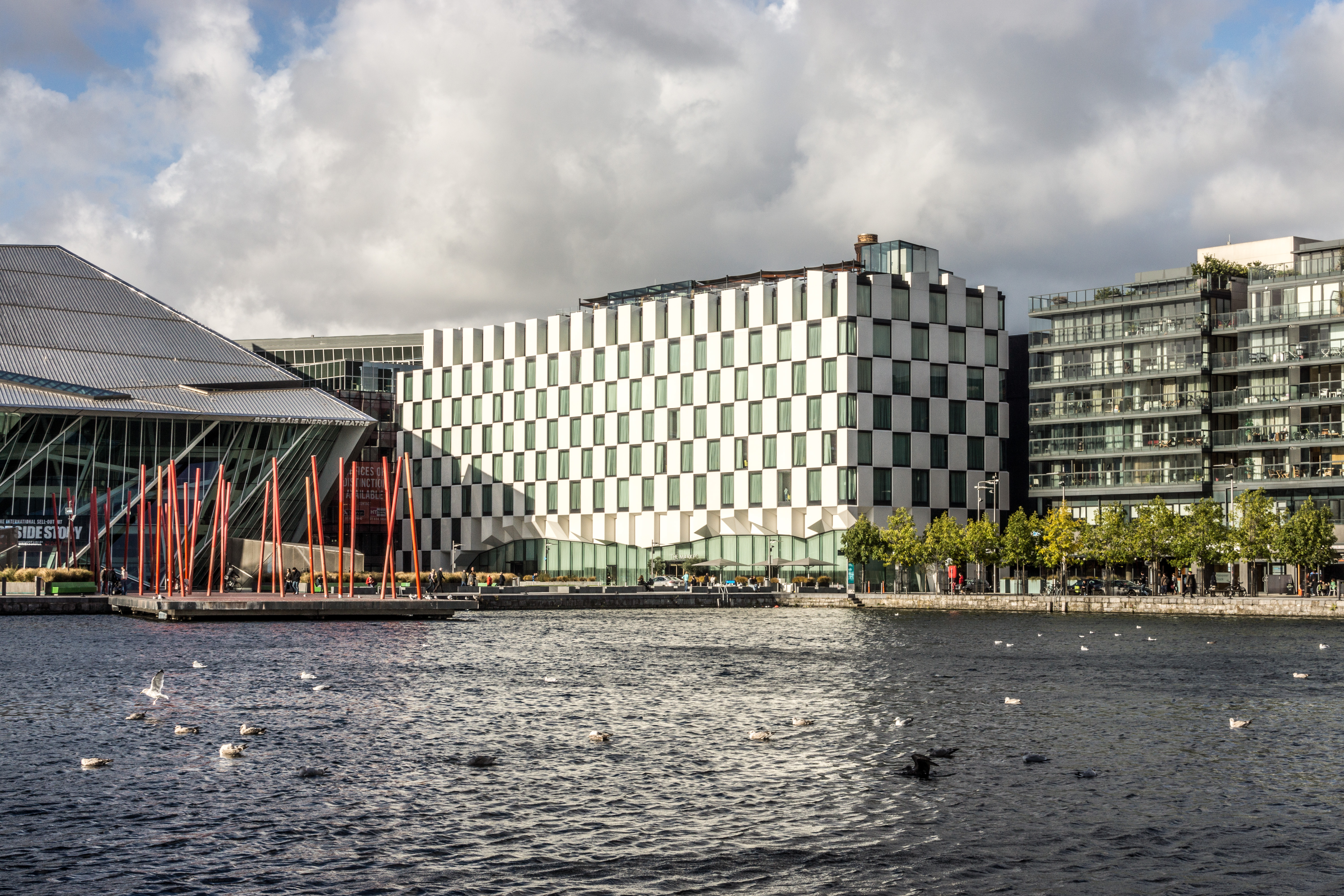
The Marker Hotel and Daniel Libeskind's Grand Canal Theatre, now known as the Bord Gáis Energy Theatre, in the Silicon Docks

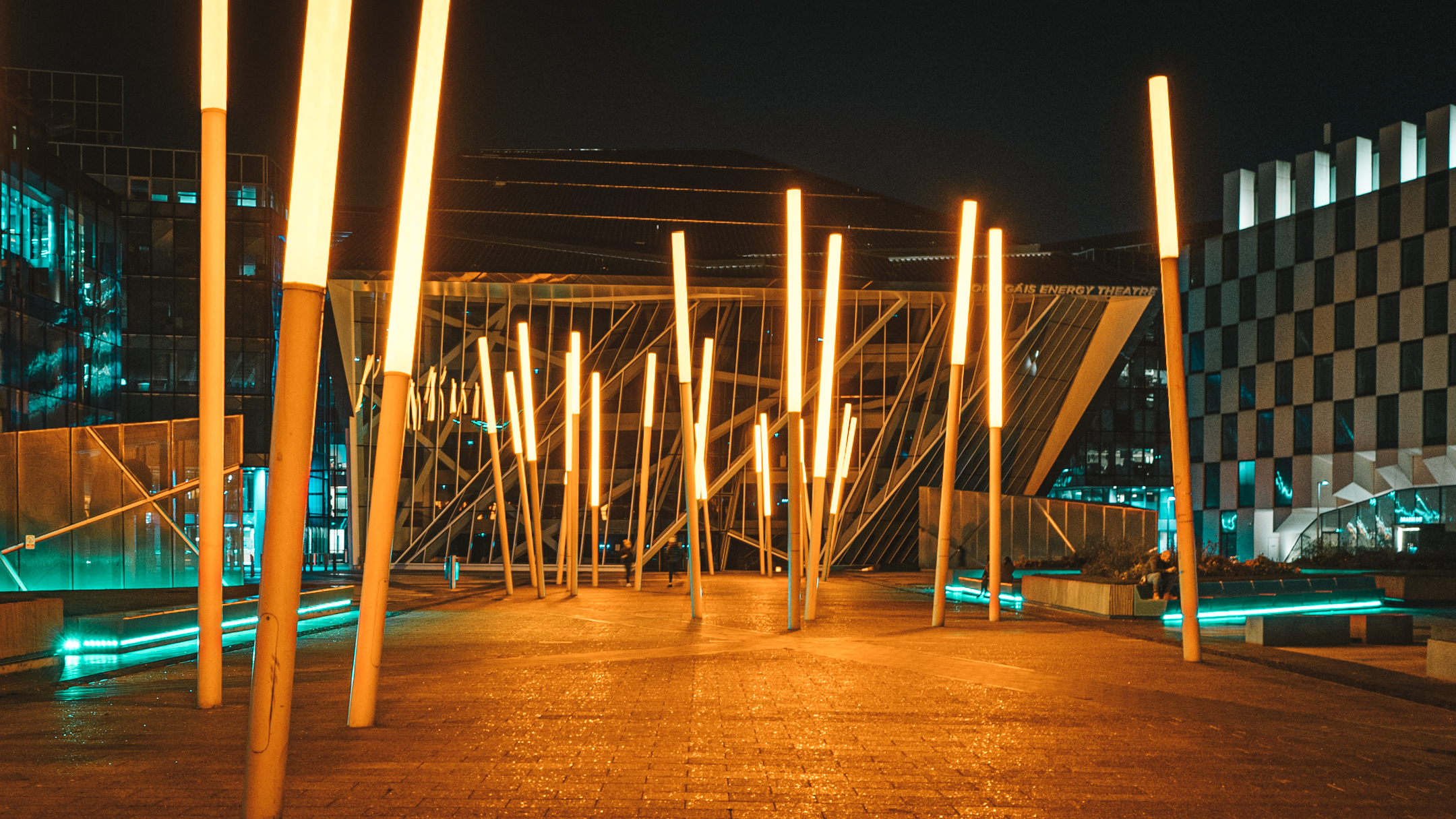
The front of the Daniel Libeskind designed Bord Gáis Energy Theatre pictured from the Martha Schwartz Partners designed Grand Canal Square

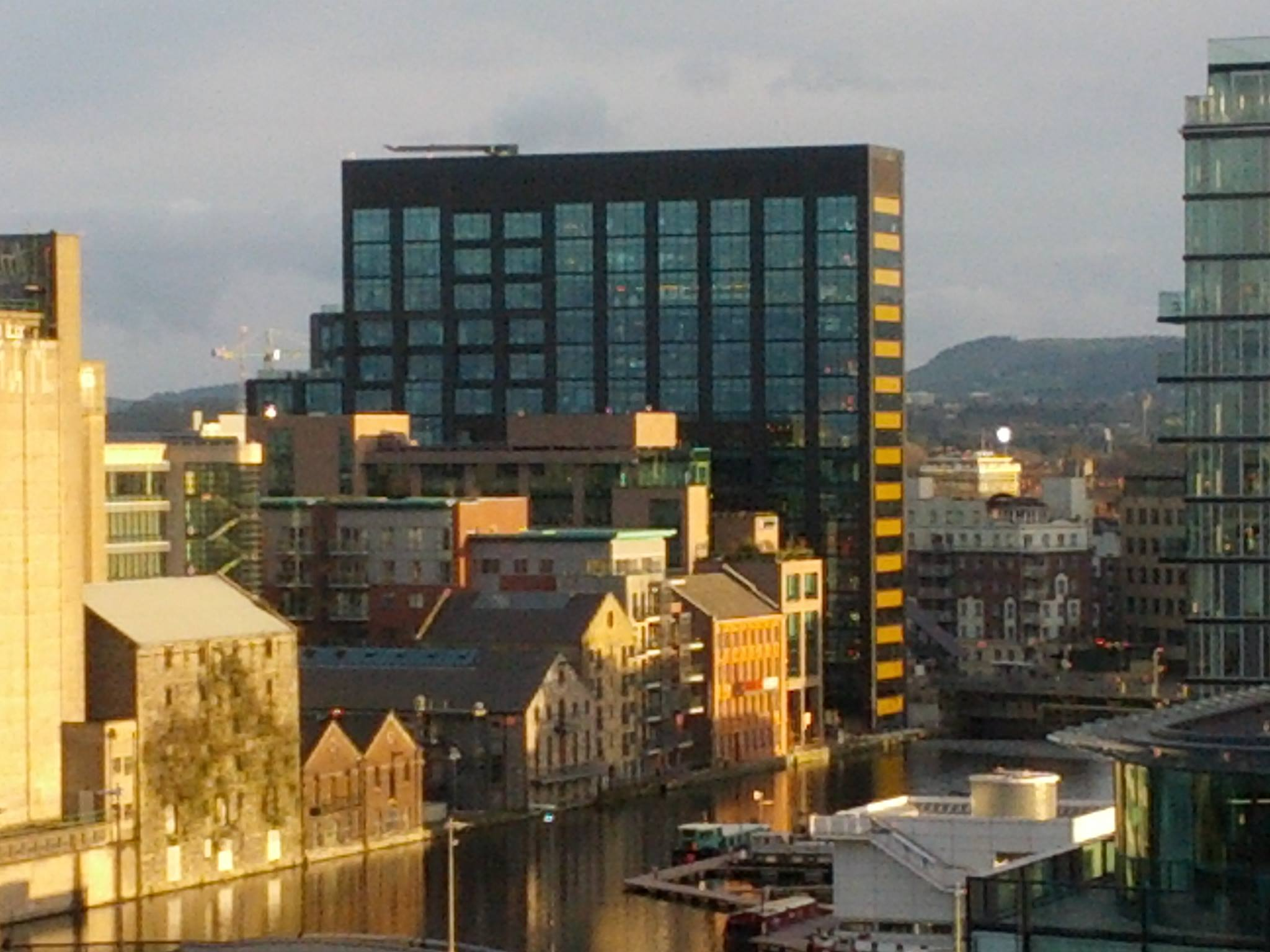
View of the Google Docks (Montevetro) building from the roof of The Marker Hotel, April 2014

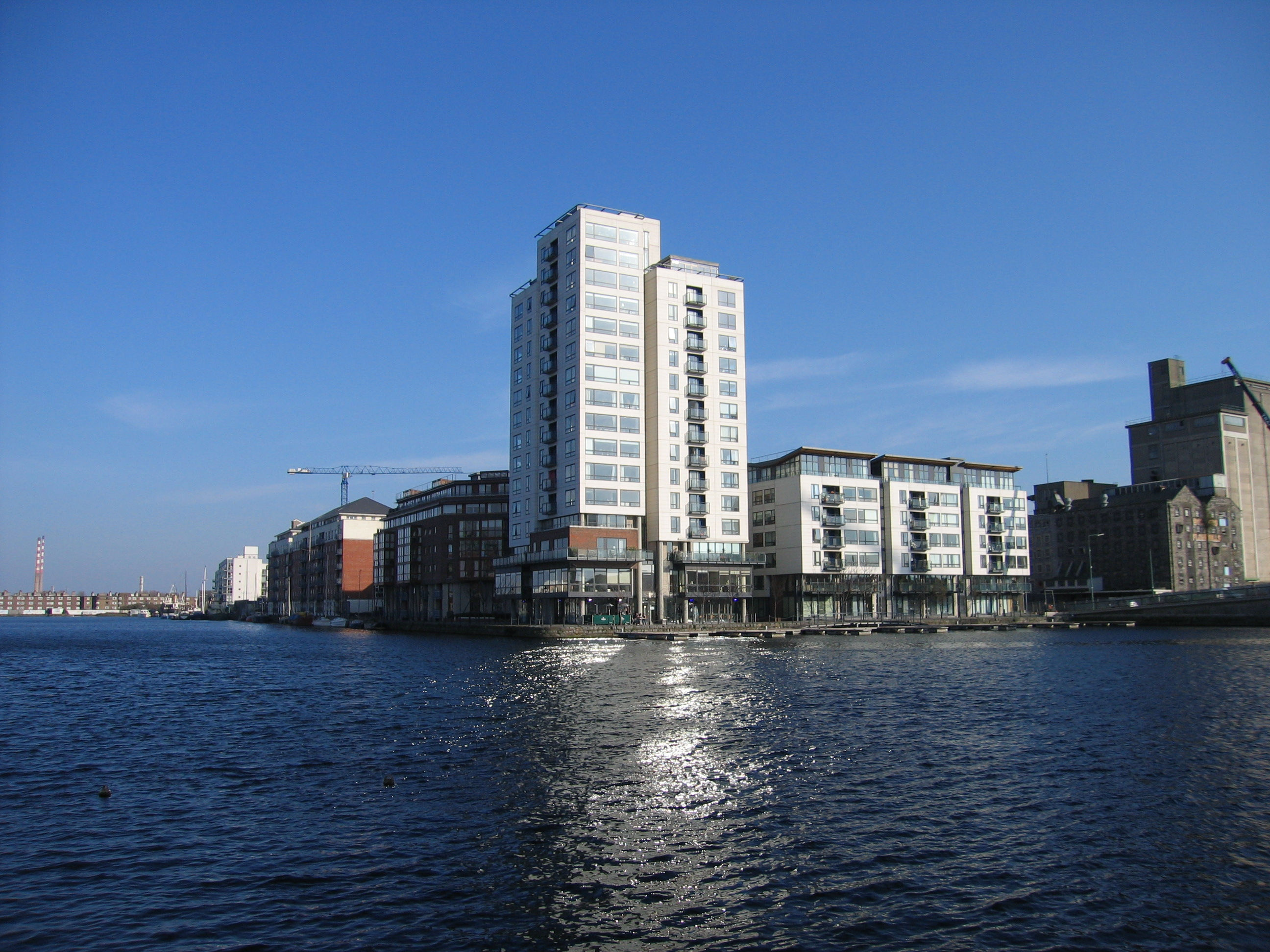
The outer basin with Millennium Tower (1998)

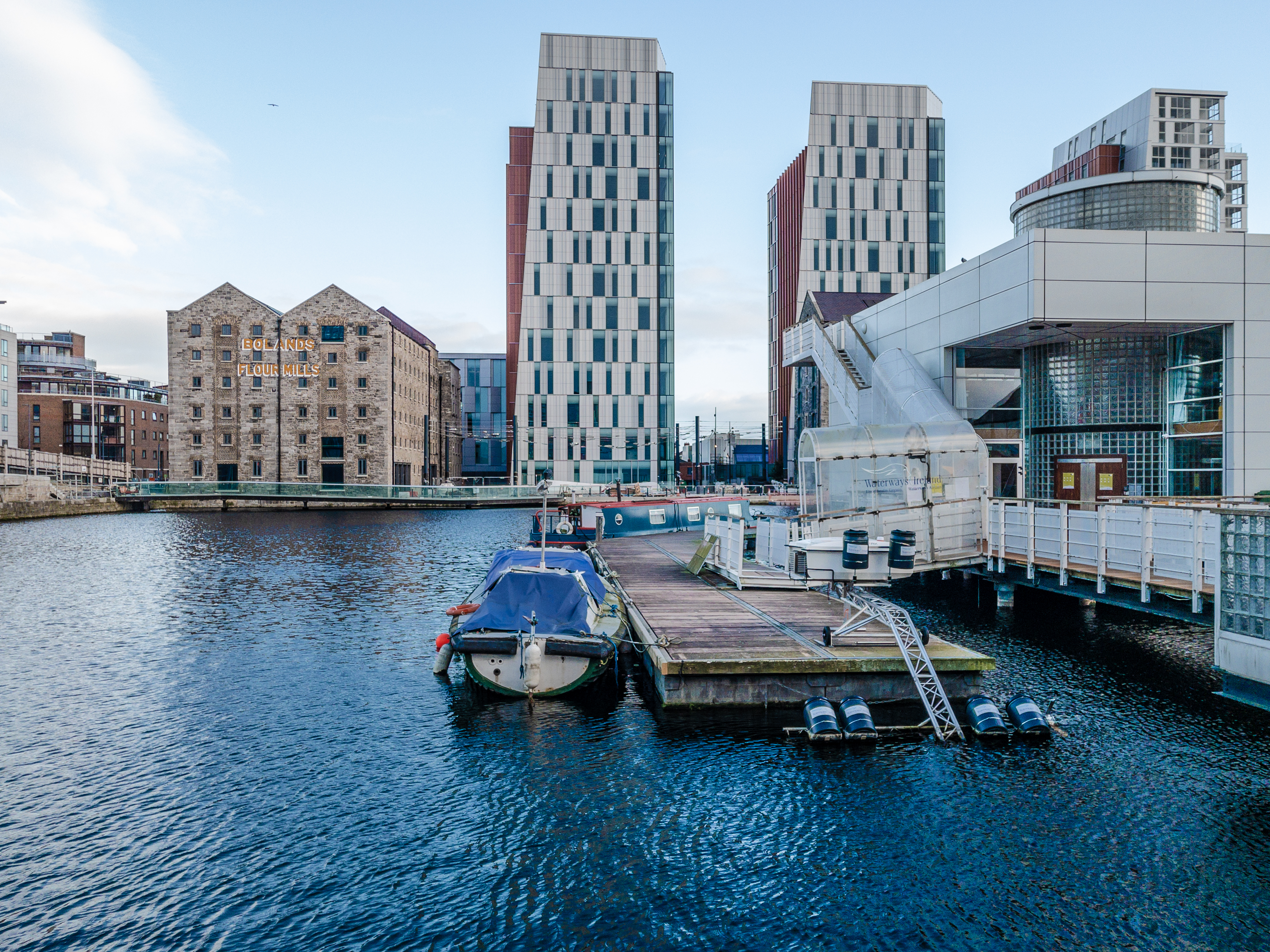
The west inner basin and Boland's Mills (background) and Waterways Ireland's visitor centre (foreground), January 2022
