= ActiveCampaign =

American software company

- Type: Private
- Industry: Software
- Founded: Chicago, Illinois (2003)
- Founder: Jason VandeBoom
- Headquarters: Chicago
- Revenue: $250 million (2024)
- Number of employees: 1000 (2022)
- Website: activecampaign.com

ActiveCampaign is a Chicago-based software company that provides a cloud-based software-as-a-service (SaaS) platform for customer experience automation. It offers tools for autonomous marketing, CRM, email marketing, SMS marketing, and WhatsApp marketing.

ActiveCampaign also utilizes AI to analyze email open rates, click rates and engagement across its platform.

Its platform features email automation builders, one-off broadcast sending, and custom analytics reporting.

== History ==
ActiveCampaign was founded in 2003 by Jason VandeBoom as a provider of on-premises email marketing software. In the early 2010s, ActiveCampaign transitioned from a licensed software model to a subscription-based SaaS model.

ActiveCampaign received its first external investment in 2016, a $20 million Series A funding round from Silversmith Capital Partners.

In January 2020, ActiveCampaign raised $100 million in a Series B round led by Susquehanna Growth Equity. In April 2021, it closed a Series C funding round of $240 million led by Tiger Global, which raised the company's valuation to over $3 billion.

== Operations ==
ActiveCampaign is a privately held company headquartered in Chicago. It maintains additional offices in Dublin, Ireland; Florianópolis, Brazil; Kraków, Poland; and Heredia, Costa Rica.

== Software ==
ActiveCampaign's platform combines email marketing, marketing automation, and sales CRM. In 2023, generative AI capabilities were added to the platform.

== Acquisitions ==
- In May 2022, ActiveCampaign acquired Postmark, a transactional email delivery service, and the related DMARC Digests tool.
- In October 2023, it acquired Onesend, an Australian provider of marketing software for multi-location businesses and franchises.
- In April 2025, it acquired Hilos, a startup based in Mexico City that provides WhatsApp messaging automation.
