= Dublin Docklands =

Area of the city of Dublin, Ireland

Map of Dublin; the Dublin Docklands are circled.

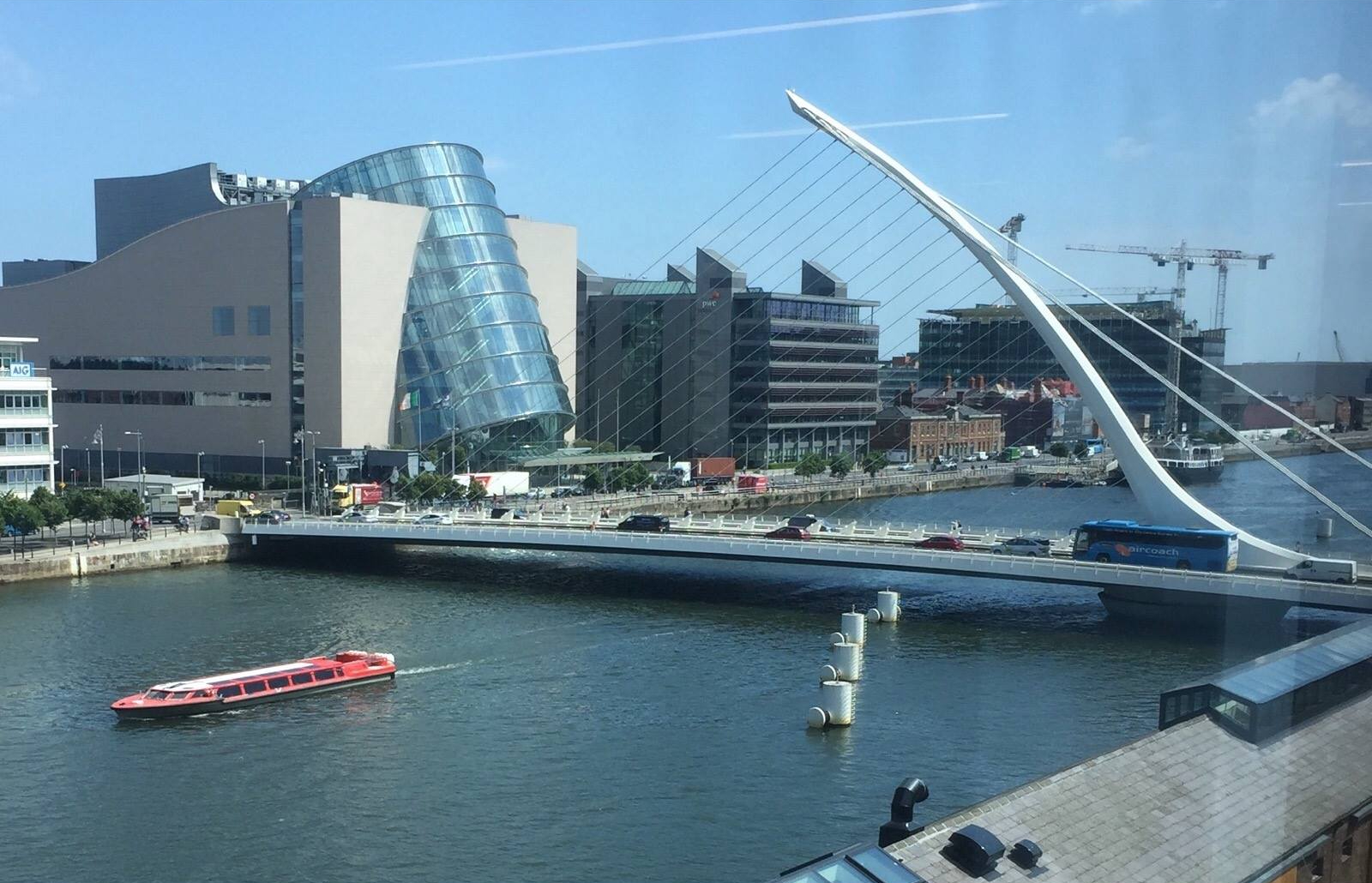
The Samuel Beckett Bridge and the Convention Centre Dublin are prominent docklands landmarks

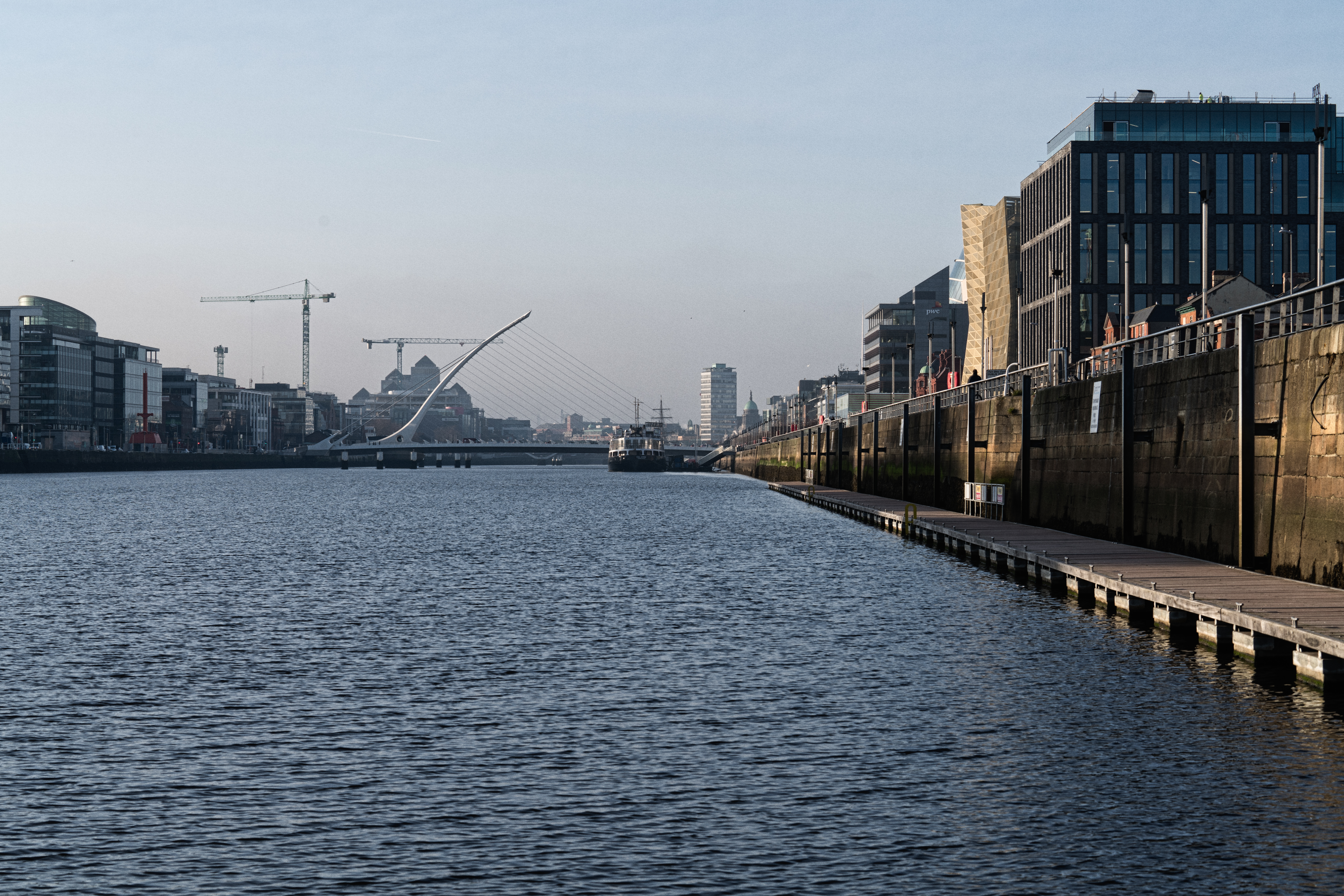
Dublin Docklands viewed from east to west

Dublin Docklands (Irish: Ceantar Dugaí Átha Cliath) is an area of the city of Dublin, Ireland, on both sides of the River Liffey, roughly from Talbot Memorial Bridge eastwards to the 3Arena. It mainly falls within the city's D01 and D02 postal districts but includes some of the urban fringes of the D04 district on its southernmost side.

In the late 20th and early 21st centuries, the docklands area was regenerated as an extension of the business hub of Dublin's International Financial Services Centre (IFSC). By 2008 the area had over 599 enterprises. While growth slowed considerably due to the post-2008 Irish economic downturn, since 2014, property values and development activity has made a recovery.

New infrastructure, built in the area in the 21st century, has included the Samuel Beckett Bridge and the LUAS Docklands extension. Venues, including the Bord Gáis Energy Theatre, the refurbished 3Arena and the Convention Centre Dublin are also in the area.

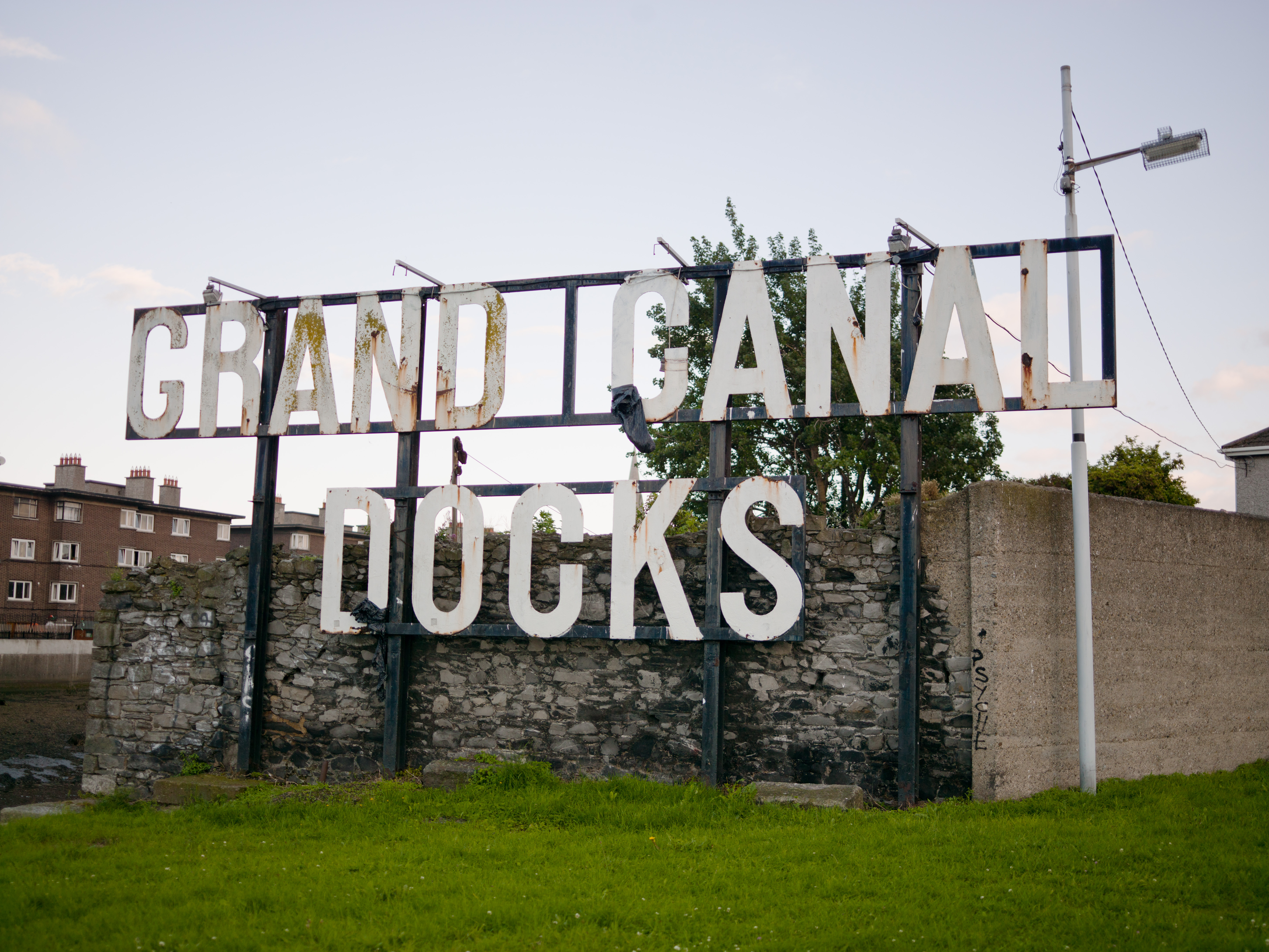
The rusting Grand Canal Docks sign at the opening to the Grand Canal.

== Projects ==
=== Projects under construction/planned ===
- On 22 May 2014, it was announced that a fast-track planning process was approved by An Bord Pleanala. 366,000 square metres of office space and 2,600 homes will be developed across 22 hectares of land in the North Lotts (in North Wall) and Grand Canal Dock areas under the Docklands Strategic Development Zone (SDZ) planning scheme.

=== Completed projects ===
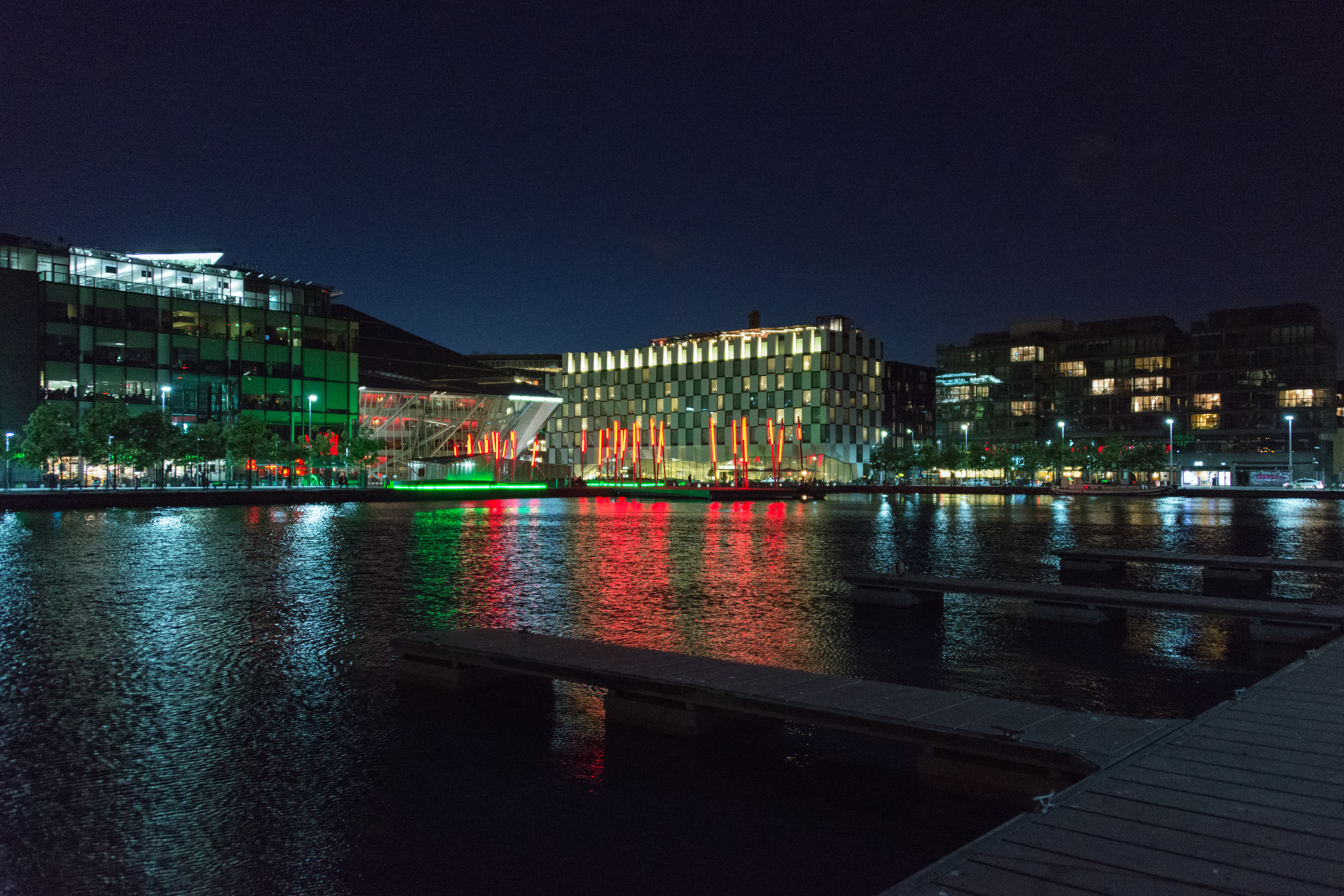
A view of Grand Canal Square in Dublin's regenerated Docklands. The Bord Gáis Energy Theatre is on the left and The Marker Hotel in the centre and Hanover Quay on the right.

- Spencer Dock: This development was originally planned to include waterside apartments, offices, retail space, a linear park and local amenities for leisure activities, although some of this was scaled back due to the economic recession. It is also the location of the Convention Centre Dublin.
- Point Village: A redevelopment beside The Point Depot, it includes a hotel, a shopping centre, 13,000 m² of office space, a 3-story underground car park, and a 12-screen cinema. While the hotel and cinema opened, the bulk of the shopping centre remains empty.
- Grand Canal Dock: The Grand Canal Dock (GCD) is a project that transformed the derelict and contaminated 10 hectare gas site at the east end of Pearse Street into a 250,000 m^{2} development of 80,000 m^{2} offices, 1,200 apartments, 10,000 m^{2} retail/bars/restaurants together with a 2,200-seat theatre and a (150-bedroom) 5-star hotel. This and the other elements of the GCD are now known as Silicon Docks and host the European HQs of Google, Facebook, and LinkedIn. Completed projects include Grand Canal Square, Marker Hotel, Alto Vetro, Google Docks (Montevetro), and the Bord Gáis Energy Theatre.
- Dublin Landings
- The Exo Building
- Central Square Park: The original "North Lotts Park" plan was cancelled and instead the small Central Square park was opened at Spencer Dock Luas station in 2014.
- Royal Canal Linear Park: The design for the one-kilometre public park on the banks of the Royal Canal in Dublin's Docklands was unveiled 11 August 2008. It is called the "Royal Canal Linear Park" and was designed by Paris-based architectural practice, Agence Ter. It features playgrounds, new bridges and sporting facilities covering six hectares. Originally, a much smaller area along the Royal Canal at Guild Street between the River Liffey and Sheriff Street Upper was cleared and grass planted. The Dublin-Galway Greenway runs along this section with some elements of the original plan being integrated. Construction of this project began in 2019 and was officially opened on 31 July 2020.
- Green on Red Gallery: An art gallery which has been in operation since 1992.

=== Temporary projects ===
- Wheel of Dublin: From July 2010 to November 2011, the 10 million euro, 350 tonne, 60-metre tall, 42 capsule Ferris wheel operated beside 'O2 Dublin' (now the 3Arena). Before its arrival in Dublin, the wheel had been located beside Belfast's City Hall from October 2007 to April 2010. Following closure in Belfast, it was dismantled and transported to Dublin. It closed due to a lack of demand, and was once again on the move, this time to York in the UK.
- Point Village Market: The outdoor weekend market was developed by businessman Harry Crosbie. It featured a large open-air stage with performances from local musicians. The market stalls offered traditional farmers' produce as well as household goods, crafts, antiques, and students' art wares. The Point Village Market was open from May to November 2010.
- Point Village on Ice: The 5000 square feet outdoor ice rink was open for a short time in the winter of 2010–2011. It opened again December 2014 – January 2015.

=== Cancelled projects ===
- U2 Tower: Also known as Britain Quay Tower, it was intended to be the tallest building on the island of Ireland at an estimated 180m. It was meant to house a recording studio for U2. In October 2008, the project was cancelled because of the economic downturn at the time. Proposals to revive the plan were reported in July 2013, but were subsequently cancelled.
- Point Village Watchtower: Point Village was originally intended to house a 120m tower, which would have included apartments, office space, a miniature TV and radio studio, and rooftop bar and restaurant with panoramic views over Dublin Bay. The project was abandoned due to the difficult economic situation faced by the Docklands Authority.
- Chocolate Factory Park: While it was reported that the building of the park was "underway" in 2005, and it was reported in 2006 that the park was being developed, the park was never built. However, in 2014 it was reported that the park would be completed by summer 2015. Currently there is a derelict site notice (within the meaning of the Derelict Sites Act 1990) dated 6 May 2014 posted at the location.

== Transport ==
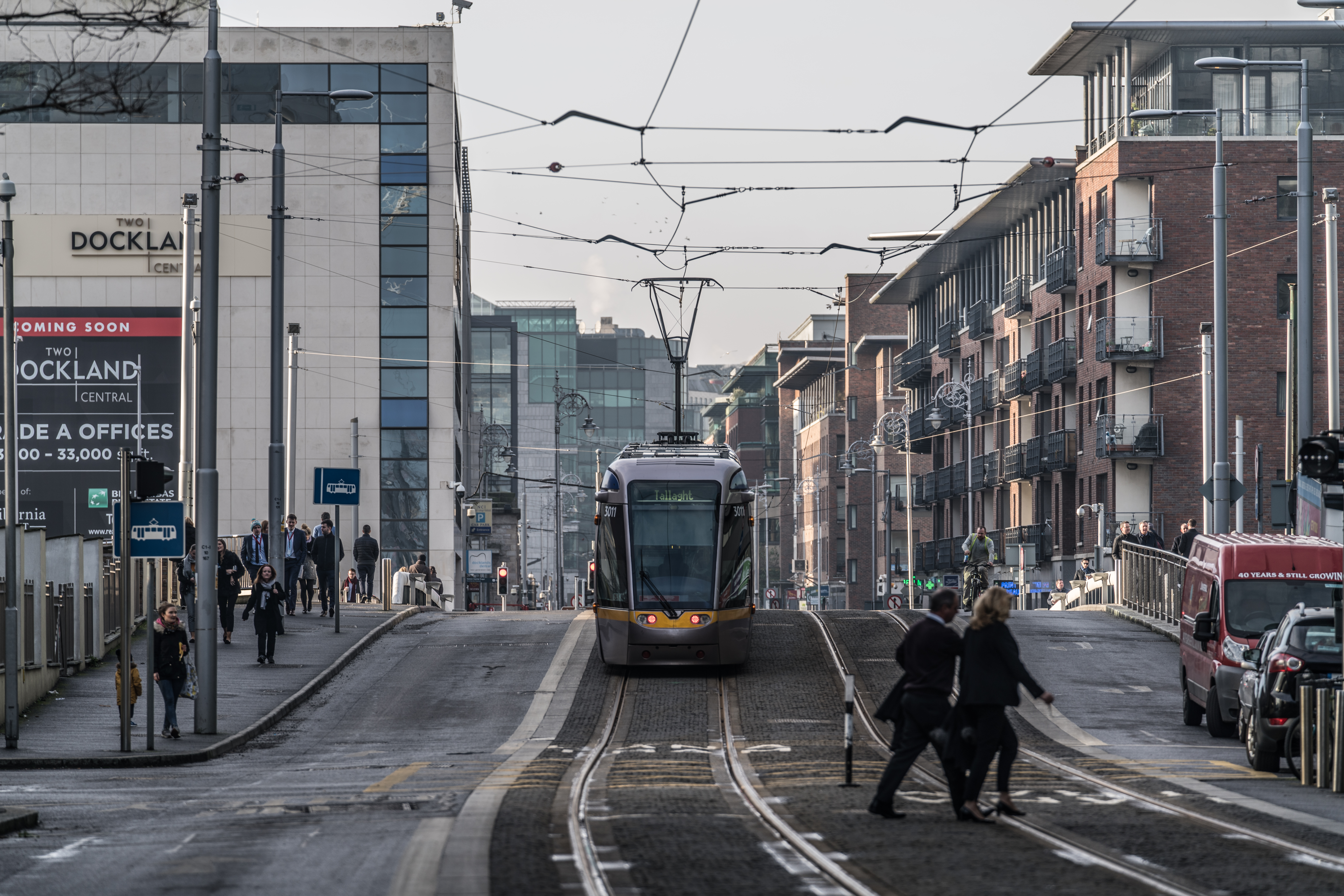
A Luas tram at Spencer Dock

DART (Dublin Area Rapid Transport) rail service has four local Dockland stations. Connolly Station north of the River Liffey and Tara Street Station south of the River are within five minutes' walk of the International Financial Services Centre (IFSC) in Docklands. At peak times, the DART runs every 10 minutes. Pearse Station and Grand Canal Dock Station serve the remainder of South Docklands.

An extension of the Luas, Dublin's tram service, runs from the city centre along Mayor Street into the northside Docklands. It has Docklands stops at Georges Dock, Mayor Square, and Spencer Dock and terminates at the Point adjacent to the 3Arena and the Gibson Hotel. At peak times the Docklands Luas extension runs every four minutes.

Iarnród Éireann opened a train station in the area in 2007. The Docklands railway station commenced service on 12 March 2007 and serves the Maynooth commuter rail line (except Drumcondra station) as far as the M3 Parkway.

Thirteen Dublin Bikes stations were opened in the Docklands in 2013–2014, at Custom House Quay, City Quay, Excise Walk, Lime Street, Guild Street, Convention Centre, New Central Bank, The Point, Benson Street, Hanover Quay, Grand Canal Dock, Barrow Street, and South Dock Road.

== Accommodation ==
Hotels in the Dublin Docklands area, on both sides of the river, include the Gibson Hotel (4 star) close to the 3Arena concert venue, the Spencer Hotel IFSC (4 star) and Hilton Garden Inn (3 star) which are both close to the Convention Centre Dublin.

On the south side of the river, there is the Maldron Hotel (4 star) on Cardiff Lane and the Marker Hotel (5 star) on Grand Canal Square both close to the Bord Gáis Energy Theatre. Also on this side of the river is the Ferryman Hotel (2 star) above the Ferryman Pub.

== See also ==
- Dublin Docklands Development Authority
- Poolbeg

== Bibliography ==
- Wonneberger, Astrid (2008). "Notions on Community, Locality and Changing Space in the Dublin Docklands". In Kokot, Waltraut; Gandelsman-Trier, Mijal; Wildner, Wonneberger (eds.). Port Cities as Areas of Transition. Ethnographic Perspectives (PDF). Bielefeld: transcript-Verlag. pp. 47–74. ISBN 978-3-89942-949-7.
