= Spencer Dock =

Canal Dock area in Dublin, Ireland

Location
- Location: Dublin, Ireland
- Coordinates: 53.3505°N 6.2401°W

Details
- Owner: Waterways Ireland
- Opened: 1873
- Type: Canal dock
- Joins: River Liffey, Royal Canal and Dublin Docklands

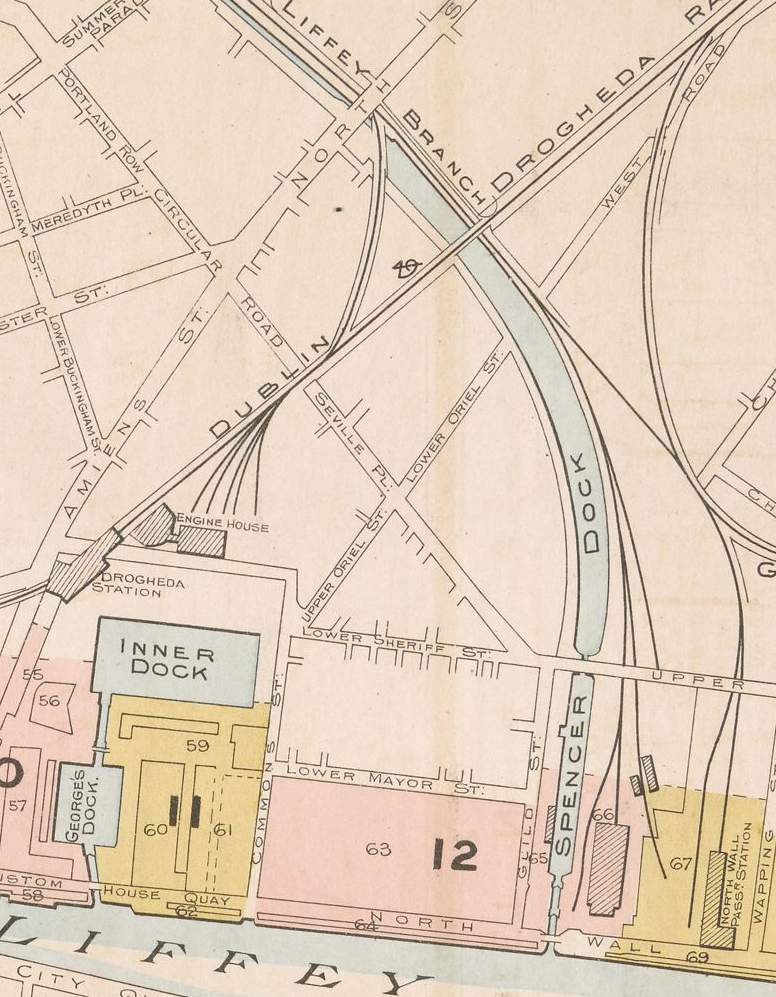
1893 plan of Spencer Dock area

Spencer Dock (Irish: Duga Spencer) is a former wharf area, close to where the Royal Canal meets the River Liffey, in the North Wall area of Dublin, Ireland. As of the 21st century, the area has been redeveloped with occupants of the Spencer Dock development including the Convention Centre Dublin, PricewaterhouseCoopers' Irish headquarters, Credit Suisse and TMF Group. The Central Bank of Ireland and NTMA have offices in the nearby Dublin Landings development.

The main building in the area was previously the former North Wall railway station which formed the terminus bringing goods and passengers to the quays.

== History ==
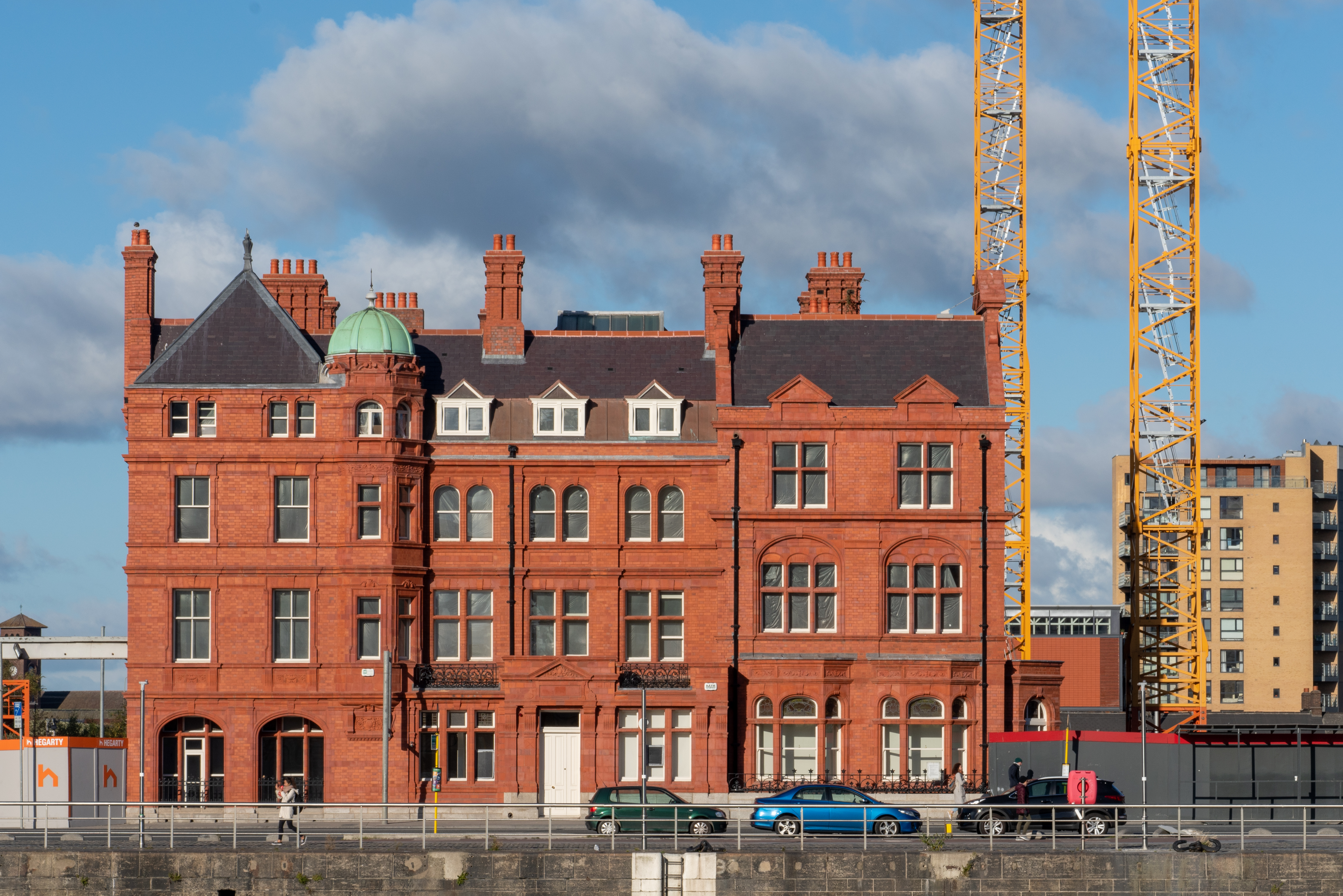
London and North Western Hotel, Dublin (1884) - lies at the front of North Wall Quay facing the river as part of the new Spencer Place development

The dockland area was originally part of the end of the Royal Canal, which still reaches the River Liffey here.

=== 1873 docks complex ===
The dock was constructed in 1873 to accommodate the coal ships and other barges primarily of the Midland Great Western Railway Company and served as both a railway and canal depot. The original Sheriff Street Drawbridge was constructed in 1873 but replaced by the Sheriff Street Lifting Bridge in 1941.

The name relates to John Spencer, 5th Earl Spencer and Lord Lieutenant of Ireland; who opened the docks complex in 1873; conferring a knighthood on MGWR chairman Ralph Cusack at the same time.

=== Modern Spencer Dock development ===
Most of the 206,000 m^{2} (51 acre) site now known as Spencer Dock was owned by Córas Iompair Éireann for much of the 20th century. With increasing land values in the early 2000s and as the freight yards became surplus to requirements, it sold the land on to Treasury Holdings while retaining a 17.5% interest in the freehold. CIÉ later also sold its minority holding to a property fund managed by Davy Group. All 614 apartments in the development were sold by November 2008.

In 2008, Price Waterhouse Coopers relocated about 2,000 staff to One Spencer Dock.

Following the appointment of receivers over the office property, the office complex was sold in its entirety for €242m in 2016.

== Geography ==
The original area was Spencer Dock area was defined by a ribbon of development from the Liffey along the Royal Canal up to about the Main Dublin to Belfast railway line, the two parts of Spencer Dock being separated by the bridge at Sheriff Street and separated from the Liffey by a sea lock. The modern development is defined as being part of the North Wall area of Dublin Docklands. The Point Village area lies to the east with Dublin Docklands claiming to be a small area between the two. One focal point of the area is the Luas tram stop and the adjacent park.

== Infrastructure ==
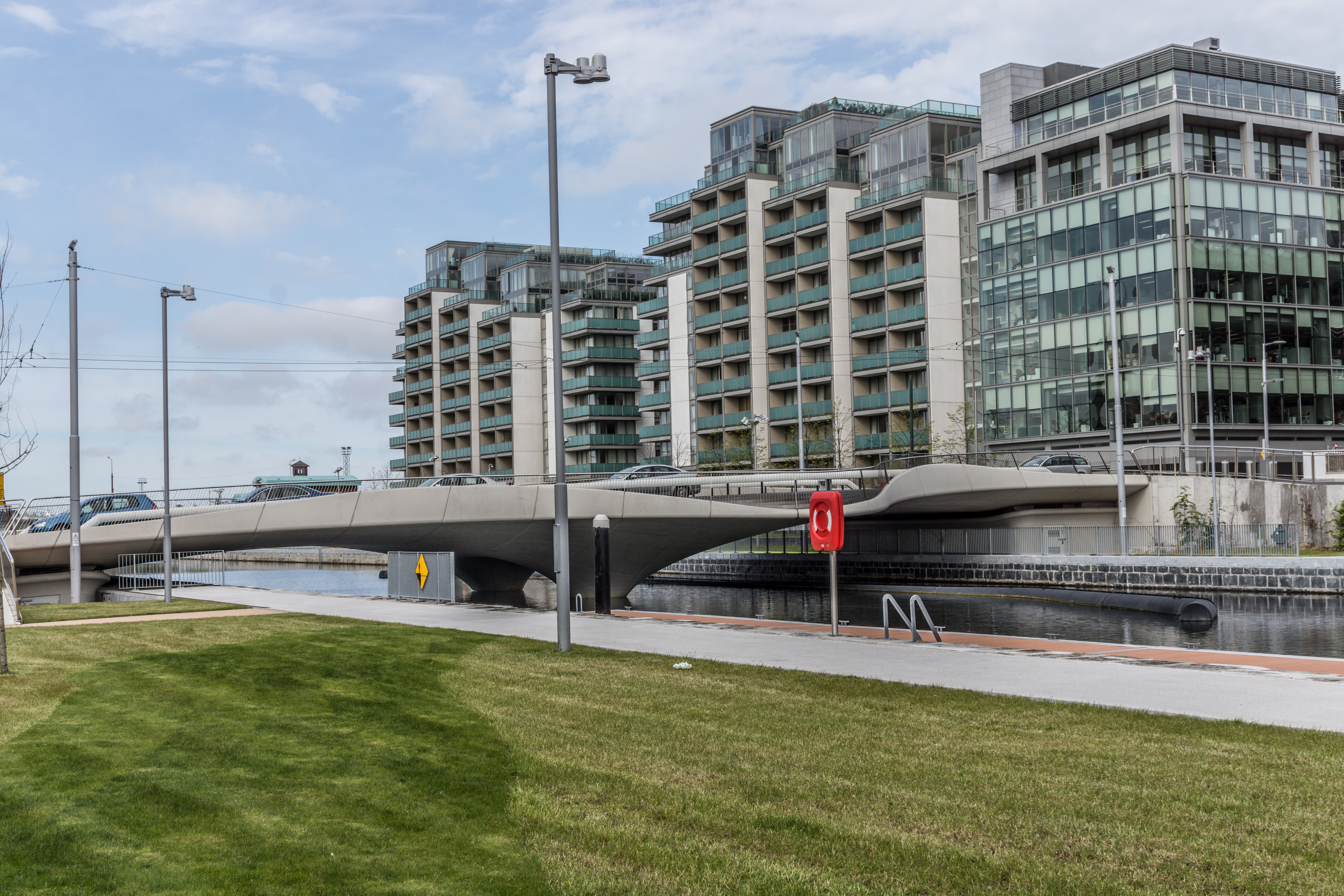
Luas and road bridge spanning Spencer Dock

=== Rail ===
Spencer Dock is served by the Docklands railway station on Sheriff Street, at the north end of the site. Commuter services to the Dublin Docklands area on the Western Commuter line began in March 2007. Under the Transport 21 initiative, at one time due for completion by 2018, the station was to move south to a permanent location along New Wapping Street. This station, proposed to connect to an extended Luas Red line, was deferred due to the Post-2008 Irish economic downturn.

=== Luas ===
The Luas Red Line which runs from Tallaght or Saggart to The Point (via Busáras and Heuston railway station) has a stop for Spencer Dock.

=== Dublin Bikes ===
In 2014, two Dublin Bikes stations were opened, one at Guild Street and another at the convention centre.

=== Bridges ===
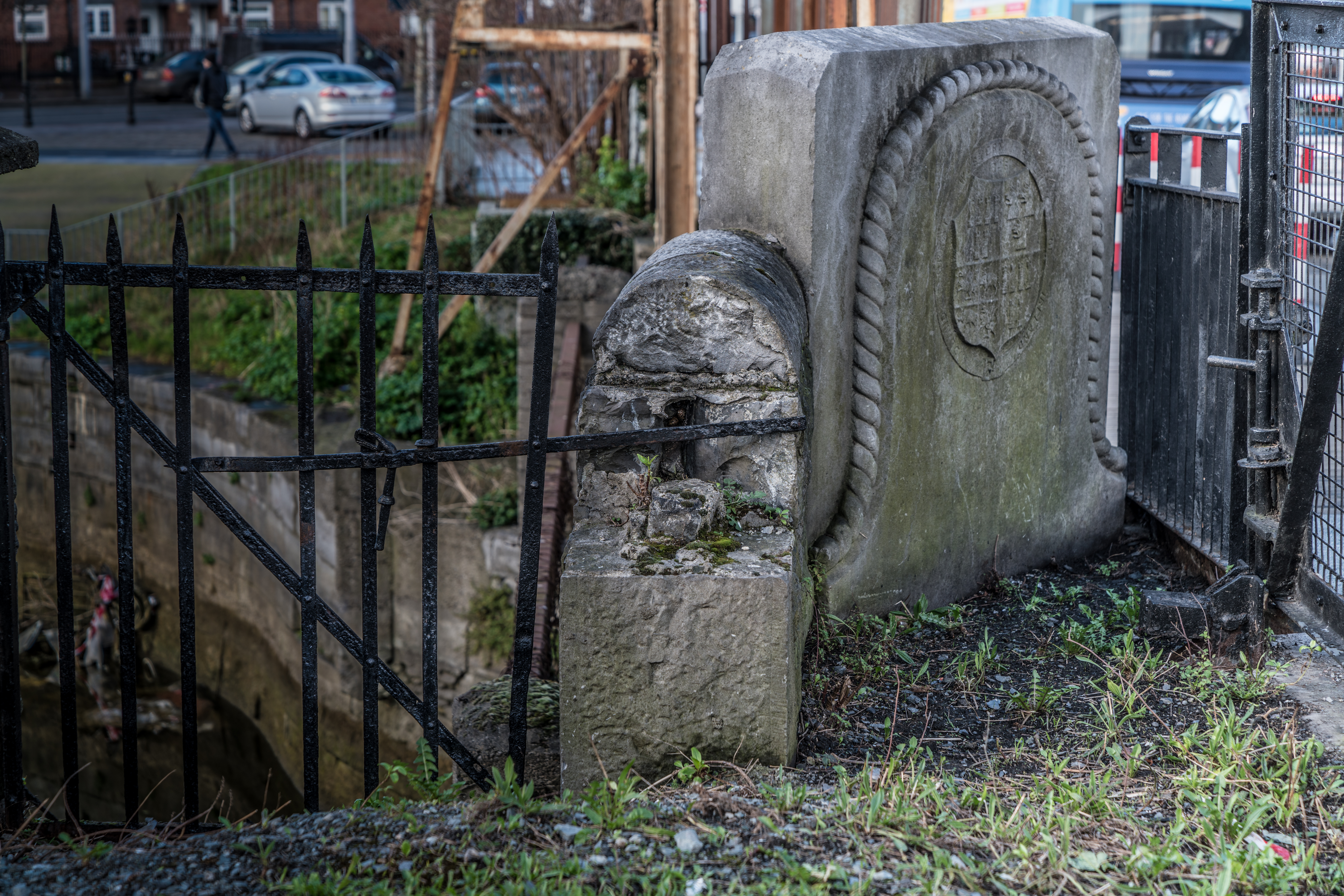
One of two stone plaques commemorating the opening of Spencer Dock in April 1873 either side of the lifting bridge at Sheriff Street.

The Sheriff Street Lifting Bridge or Spencer Bridge is a single-span bascule bridge which was installed between 1939 and 1941.

It replaced the earlier original James Price designed swivel bridge of 1873 which was the first mechanical crossing of Spencer Dock, and separated its inner and outer portions. The original bridge was made with Multyfarnham and Oranmore limestone for the Midland Great Western Railway. The limestone plaques to mark the opening of the dock and bridge and part of the railings remain intact as of 2026.

The Spencer Dock Bridge carries road, Luas and pedestrian traffic from Dublin over the Royal Canal into the Spencer Dock area. The Spencer Dock Luas stop is some 200m to the east. The bridge c. 200m north of where the Royal Canal meets the Liffey, while the Sheriff Street Lifting bridge carrying the R101 road is a further 160m north. The bridge has a shallow desk of just 2 feet (0.61 m) thick while the width varies from 62 feet (19 m) to 95 feet (29 m).

The Scherzer Rolling lifting bridge separates the outer Spencer Dock and the Royal Canal from the River Liffey. This pair of bridges was erected in 1912 by the firm of Spencer & Co. of Melksham in Wiltshire to replace a rolling drawbridge placed there by the Midland and Great Western Railway Company in 1860.

Another lifting bridge named Newcomen Rail Lifting Bridge over the Royal Canal was repaired as part of works on the Royal Canal Greenway from Sheriff Street to North Strand Road. The bridge is operated by Iarnród Éireann and only opens seven or eight times per year to allow canal traffic to pass.

== See also ==
- Grand Canal Dock
