= Point Village =

Mixed-use development in the northern Docklands of Dublin

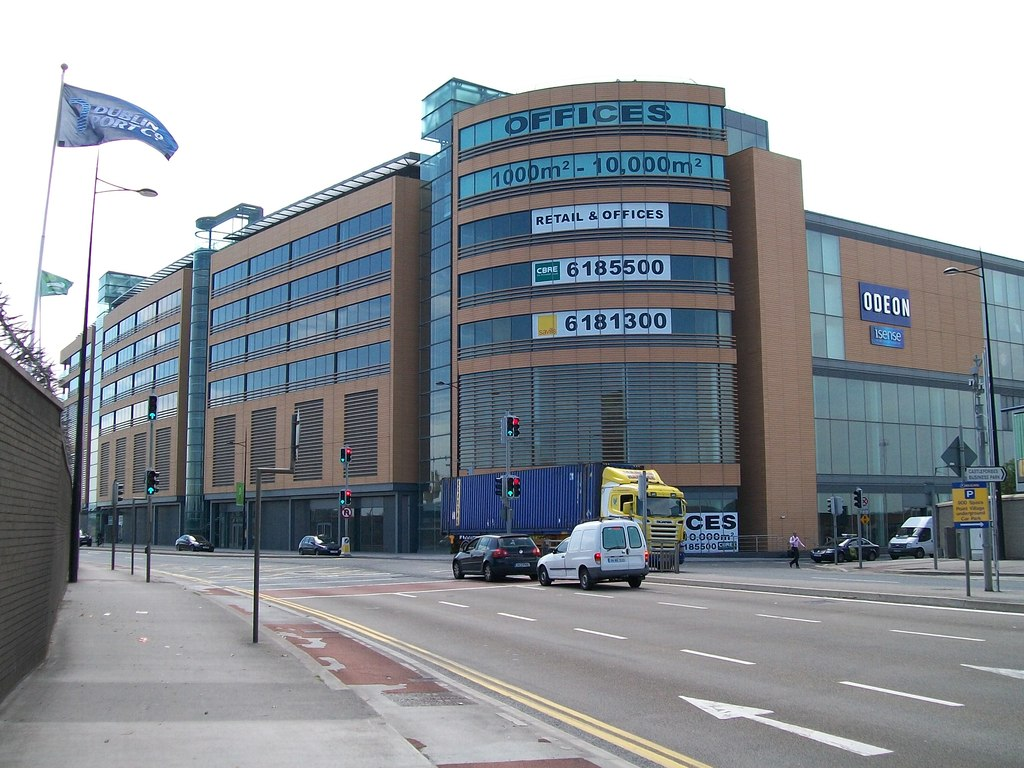
- Office block development at the Point Village
- Interactive map of Point Village

General information
- Location: Dublin, Ireland
- Coordinates: 53.348°N 6.229°W

The Point Village (Irish: Sráidbhaile an Iosta) is a commercial and residential development in the North Wall area of Dublin, Ireland. The elements of the €800 million development completed to date include offices and residential and hotel accommodation, a small shopping centre, a cinema, a museum and a five-level underground car park. The development ran into a number of problems and was taken over by NAMA in April 2013.

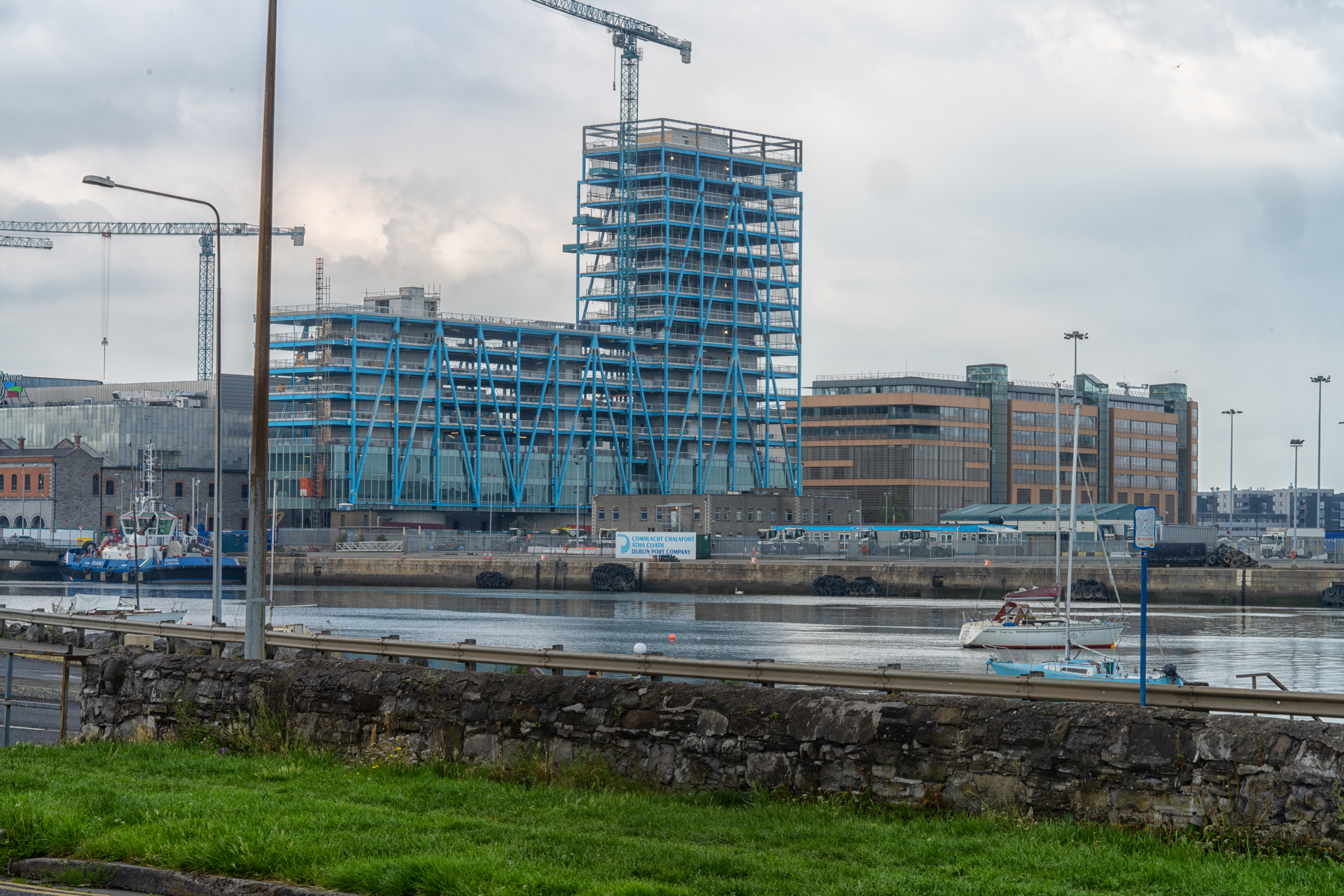
Exo Tower, Dublin under construction in the Point Village area in June 2020

== Development ==
=== Completed projects ===
==== Point Square ====
The main building of the development - now branded as Point Square - containing the retail, hotel and cinema elements as well as office space - was completed prior to the post-2008 Irish economic downturn, however the retail element did not open except as an entry to the cinema.

Dunnes Stores had agreed to be the anchor of the retail element, but has delayed opening the store for more than a decade, appealing repeated legal demands to do so. Some of the internal units are to be combined and converted to health or leisure units due to continued low demand for retail Dunnes Stores eventually opened a supermarket and a Cafe Sol outlet in the shopping centre in 2023 and have since opened an extended Grocery, Fashion & Homeware store in December 2024. The shopping centre now houses a Barbers and Boots Pharmacy. The office space has been taken by Oath, moving some operations from their main location at East Point Business Park, and Voxpro.

The hotel element of the development operates as The Gibson Hotel, opened in June 2010 and including nine suites, with access to terrace gardens. It also includes a spa, gymnasium, two outdoor hot-tubs and large conference facilities.

Other tenants include Starbucks, Eddie Rockets, Ruby's Pizza & Grill and the Glasshouse Bar outside in the square.

==== 3Arena ====
The 3Arena (formerly the O_{2} concert venue) opened in December 2008, built on the site of the former Point Theatre, a music venue which operated from 1988 to 2007. Following its closure, the site underwent major redevelopment and was renamed after O2 phone company. In September 2014, the music venue was renamed 3Arena, after O2 Ireland was sold to Three.

==== Student accommodation ====
Student accommodation provider Canvas has built a 996-bed unit named "Point Campus" to the North of the development, featuring retail on the ground floor, where tenants include Centra, Pita Pit and Camile Thai.

==== Other projects ====
The 73m Exo Building was completed, in 2022, at the eastern end of Point Village.

As of 2018, an aparthotel was under construction to the west of the 3Arena, filling the last empty site. This hotel was acquired by SACO, a UK based apart-hotel group, and was due to be operated by Lockeliving.

=== Temporary or cancelled projects ===
The Point Village Square hosted a market from May to November 2010, as well as The Revolver, a €10m "observation wheel", from July 2010 until November 2011.

The Dublin Flea Market held its annual Christmas event inside the Point Square building until 2018.

There were plans to build a 120-metre skyscraper (called the "Point Village Watchtower") with apartments, offices and a bar and restaurant. Although the developer invested circa €15 in underground works, the project was later abandoned.

== Transport ==
The Point is the easternmost terminus of the docklands extension of the Luas Red Line light rail system is located in the middle of the development. This Luas link to Tallaght and Saggart connects the Point Village to other transport options, including the DART, suburban rail, Busáras, mainline rail, and the future MetroLink. The Dublin Port Tunnel southern portal is located nearby.

== See also ==
- Dublin Docklands
- Spencer Dock
- Grand Canal Dock
