= Boland's Mills =

Mixed use development in Dublin City

Coordinates: 53.342024°N 6.237135°W

- Muilte Uí Bheoláin

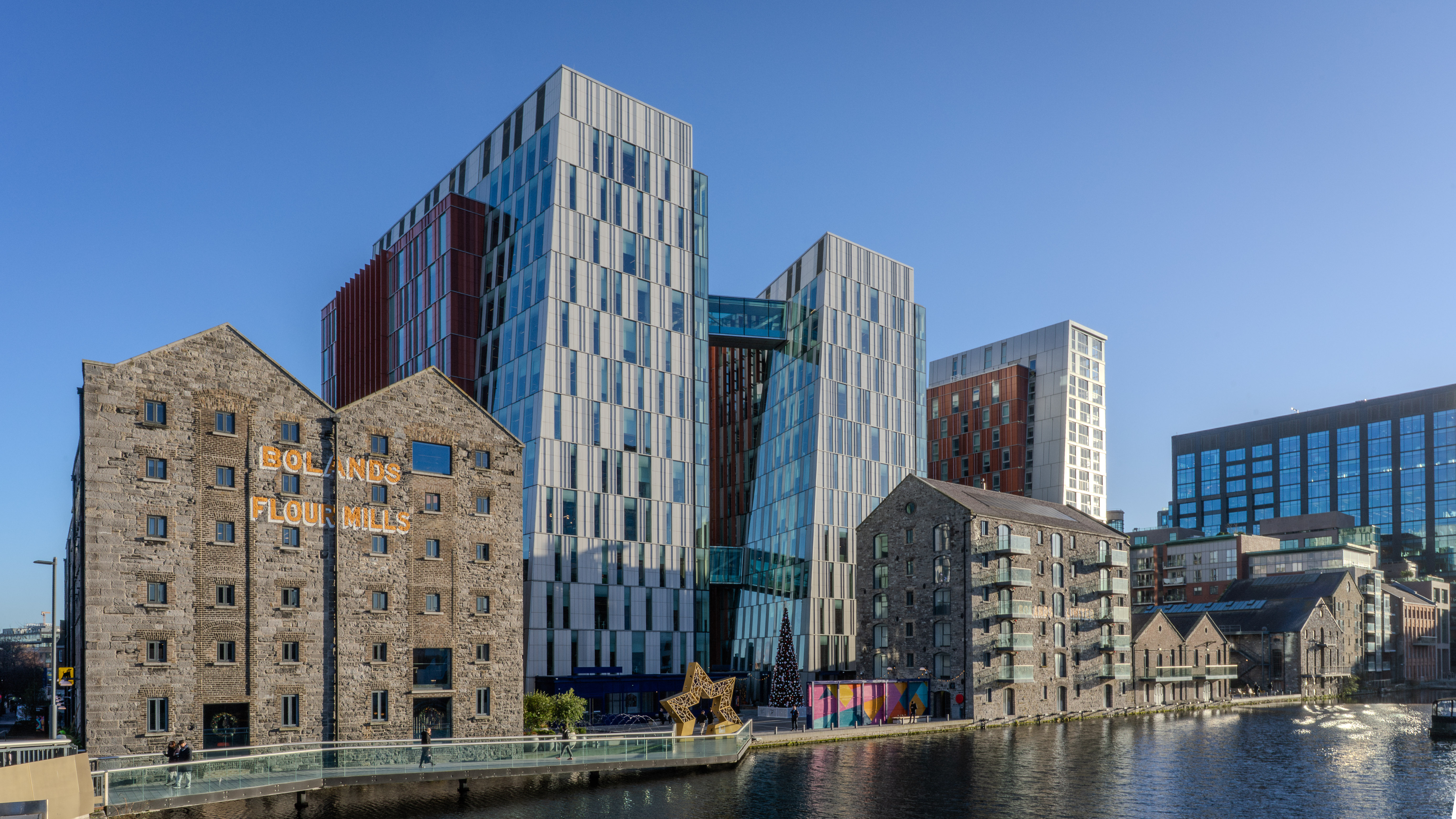
- Interactive map of the Boland's Mills area
- Former names: Boland's Quay

General information
- Location: Dublin, Ireland
- Completed: 2025
- Owner: Google

Height
- Height: Building 1: 53.65 m (176.02 ft) Building 2: 53.5 m (175.52 ft) Building 3: 47.8 m (156.82 ft)
- Top floor: 12

Design and construction
- Architecture firm: BKD Architects

Other information
- Public transit: Grand Canal Dock

Website
- https://www.bolandsmills.com/

Boland's Mills is a mixed-use development in Dublin, Ireland, on Ringsend Road between the inner basin of Grand Canal Dock and Barrow Street. The site includes several 19th-century warehouses originally associated with Boland's Bakery. After ceasing operation as a bakery in 2001, it passed through several hands before falling into control of the National Asset Management Agency (NAMA) following the 2008 financial crisis. NAMA initiated a €150 million reconstruction scheme to deliver new residences and commercial, retail, and civic spaces.

The development was bought in 2018 by Google, which had a significant existing office footprint on and around Barrow Street. By July 2024, the development comprised 46 residential units for key workers, 300,000 square feet (28,000 square metres) of office space for Google, and ground floor commercial units including a bar, bakery, food hall, and coffee shop which were due to be opened between late 2024 and early 2025.

== History ==
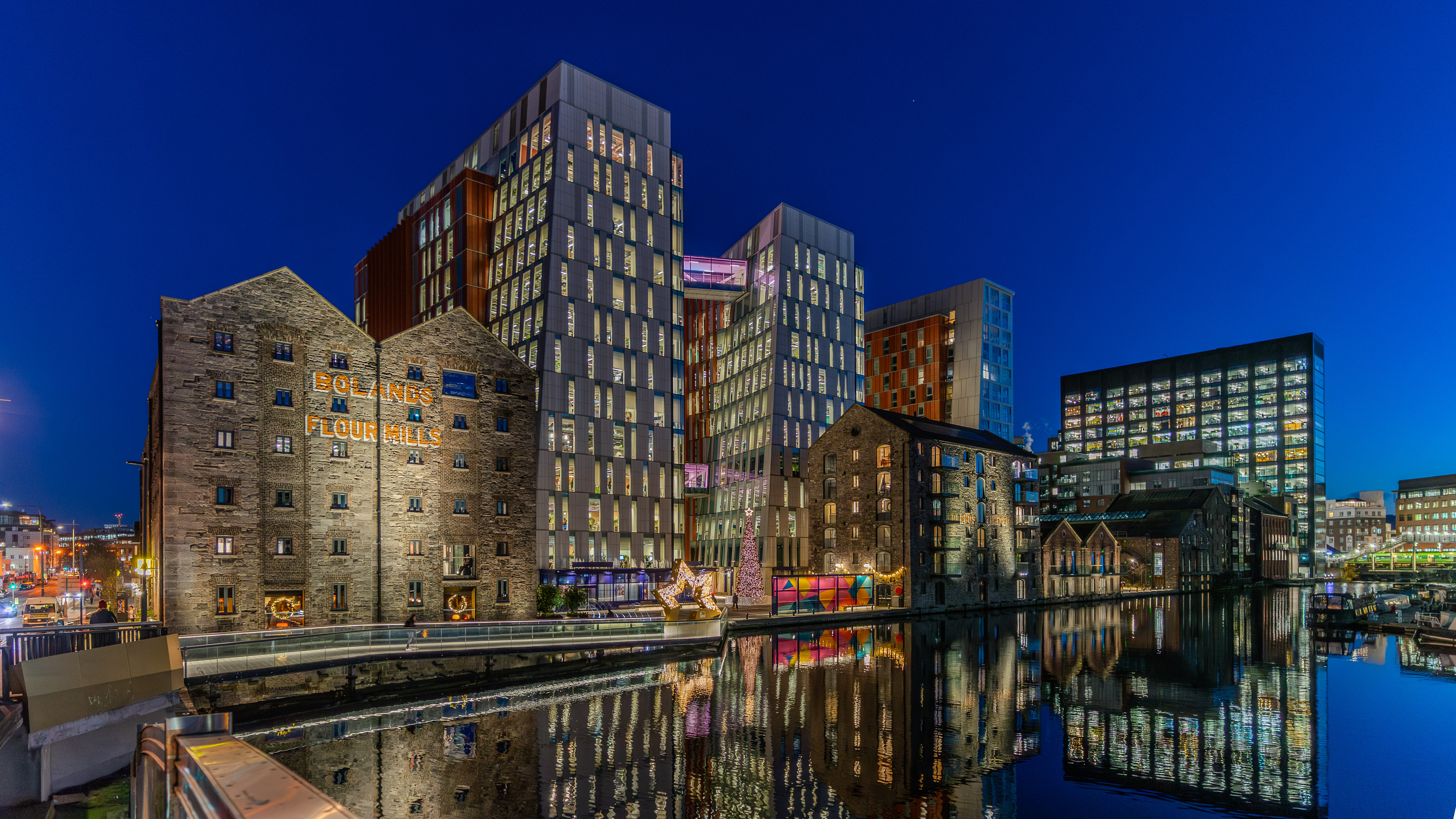
Boland's Mills at night.

=== Development of mills ===
The site includes a number of buildings that were formerly owned by Boland's Bakery. There are two six-storey stone warehouse buildings dating from the 1830s, and others on Barrow Street dating from the 1870s. In the several decades before its involvement in the rising, it was used as a flour mill. Much of the complex consisted of concrete silos built between the 1940s and 1960s. The mills stopped production in 2001 and the site lay derelict pending development from that period until the redevelopment commenced in 2016.

Within the complex of buildings, the older 19th century calp limestone buildings facing onto Ringsend Road and Grand Canal Dock together with two terraced houses on Barrow Street are protected structures. The taller concrete silos on the site were not protected structures, and were demolished during construction in 2017-2018.

=== 1916 Easter Rising ===
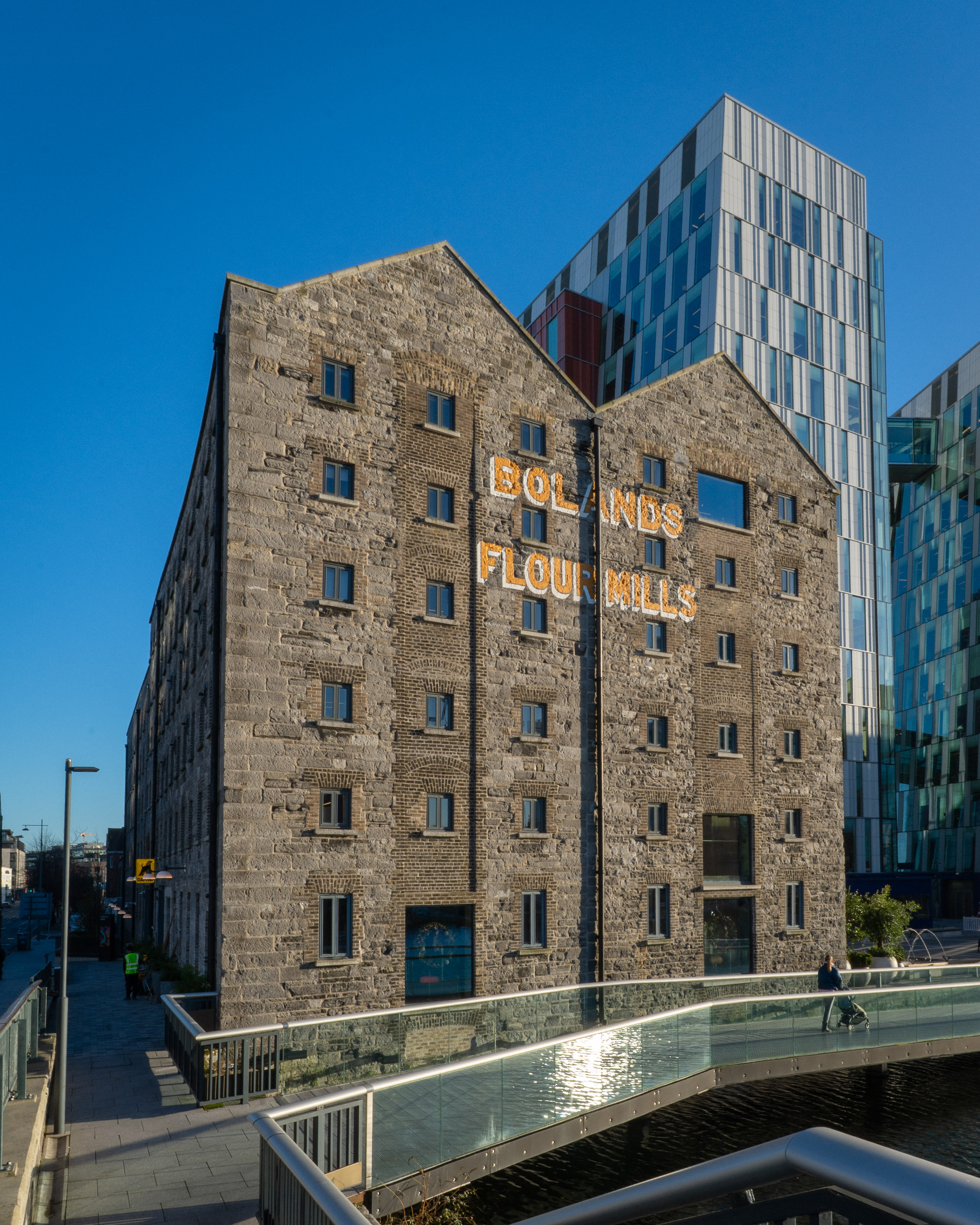
Boland's Flour Mills

During the 1916 Easter Rising, the area around Boland's Mills (including what is now the Treasury Building and Boland's Bakery) was headquarters to the 3rd Battalion of Irish Volunteers under Éamon de Valera. From Easter Monday, 24 April 1916, a unit of Irish Volunteers occupied the area intending to control the main approaches from Dún Laoghaire (then Kingstown) towards the city centre. De Valera raised a green flag with a golden harp, the symbol of an independent Ireland, on the mills. On Wednesday 26 April 1916, a detachment of Sherwood Foresters, sent to Dún Laoghaire from England, made their way into the city via Mount Street Bridge. The ensuing engagement, the Battle of Mount Street Bridge, saw the first direct engagement with the Boland's Mills garrison. The west side of the mills was subject to "unceasing sniping, which lasted all the week up to Saturday", returned fire from the Boland's Mills garrison kept British forces at bay until Patrick Pearse's surrender order was received on 30 April. Patrick Whelan, an Irish Volunteer of the Boland's Mills garrison killed on 26 April 1916, was posthumously awarded the 1916 Medal.

The mills were appropriated by the British military after the rising. The owners threatened to shut the mills down and put 400 employees out of work due to lack of compensation from the military, which was then granted by the authorities. This period also saw agitation from the workers, who went on strike for better pay, leading to arbitration talks.

== Redevelopment ==
=== Celtic Tiger era plans and redevelopment ===
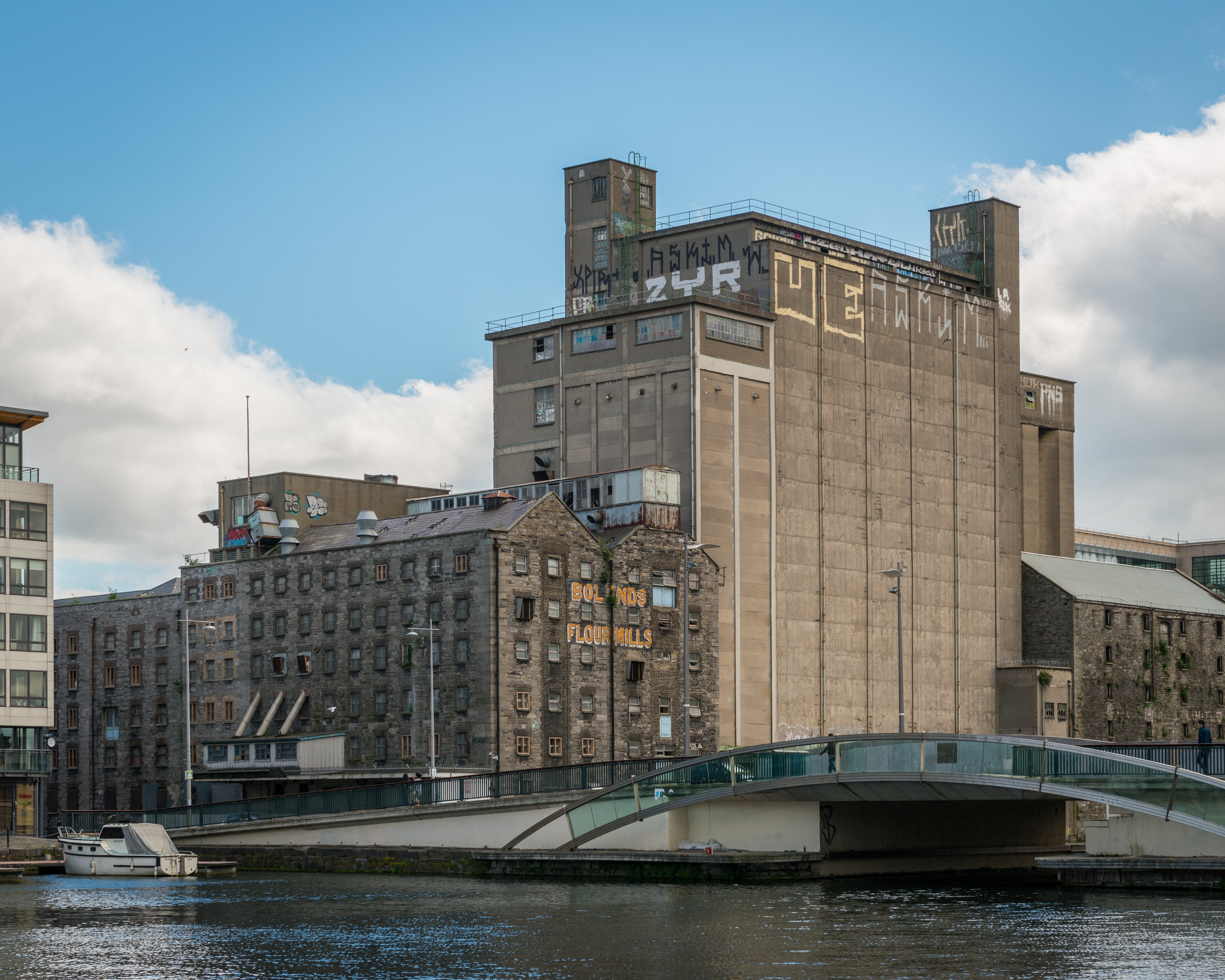
The derelict mills in August 2015

The Boland's Mills site had planning permission for an office, residential and retail/hotel redevelopment granted by the Dublin Docklands Development Authority (under Section 25 of the Dublin Docklands Development Authority Act, 1997). The site was sold for €42m in 2004 to Versus Limited/Benton Properties who had planned to develop 67 apartments, two houses, 13,284 square metres (142,990 sq ft) of office space, as well as retail and leisure facilities.

Following the property market bust, the site's value dropped 84% from €61m in 2007 to €9.9m in 2009, according to accounts filed by Versus with the Companies Office that also showed it owed parent company Benton €15.8m. The National Asset Management Agency (NAMA) took control of the site in late 2012, after Versus went into receivership; the firm was liquidated in 2015. NAMA undertook to develop the site, and in 2015 it began a €150 million reconstruction due to be known as Bolands Quay, and to accommodate new residences, commercial, retail, and civic spaces.

=== Google acquisition and reopening ===
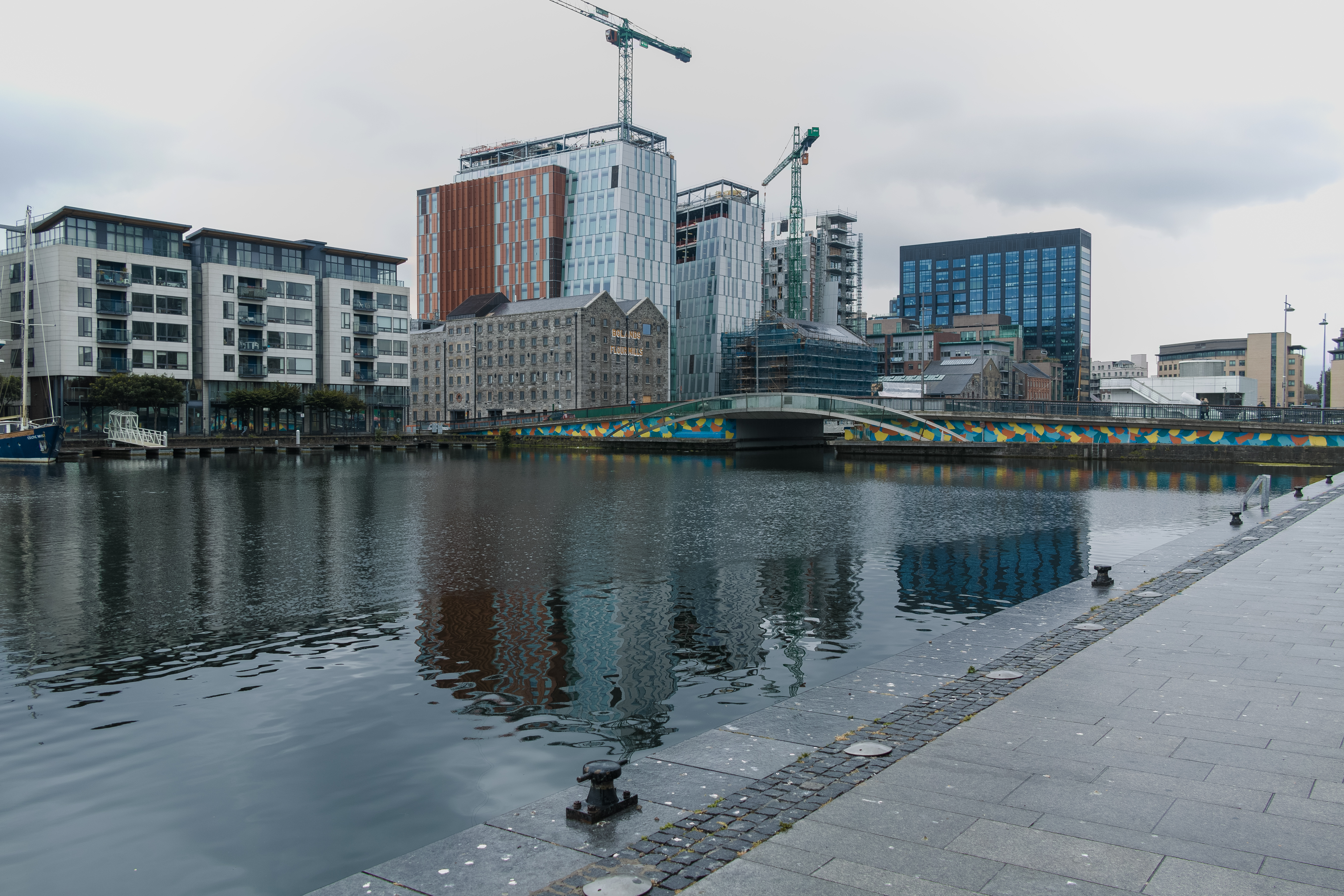
The development under construction in May 2020, with Charlotte Quay apartments in the foreground and the Google Docks office in the background

In May 2014, it was reported that tech company Google, which had a significant office footprint in and around Barrow Street, was considering the derelict site for further expansion of their operations. In May 2018, it was announced that the company had bought the site for an unspecified price from the National Asset Management Agency (who had been seeking approximately €170m). The project experienced construction delays in 2019 due to necessary remedial works. In 2020, Google was granted planning permission to reduce the proportion of office space, initially planned to accommodate 2,500 staff, in favour of more retail and restaurant space, and an open market modelled on Old Spitalfields Market.

Google opened the first phase of its development, the Flour Mills building, in September 2023 as a collaboration space. The 300,000 sq feet of office space is due to form Google's engineering hub in Ireland, accommodating 1000 staff. As of July 2024, 80% of the development's commercial units had been leased and were proposed to be opened on a "phased basis between late 2024 and early 2025". Planning permission for change of use of one of the units to a pub was approved in August 2024 over residents' objections. By March 2025, all units had been let, and the commercial spaces were due to be occupied by retail, café, restaurant and other tenants. The 46 apartments in the residential tower were leased by Google to approved housing body Clúid at a nominal fee to be offered at a discounted cost rental rate to key workers (nurses, teachers, gardaí) who were from, lived in, or worked in the area. "Bláthú", a mural of abstract shapes and colours by local artist Sean Atmos, was installed on the side of one of the buildings making up the Boland's Mills complex in Summer 2025; at nine-storeys and 724 square metres, it was Ireland's largest at the time of installation.
