= Theobald Wolfe Tone FitzGerald =

Irish officer and flag painter

- Tiobóid Mac Gearailt
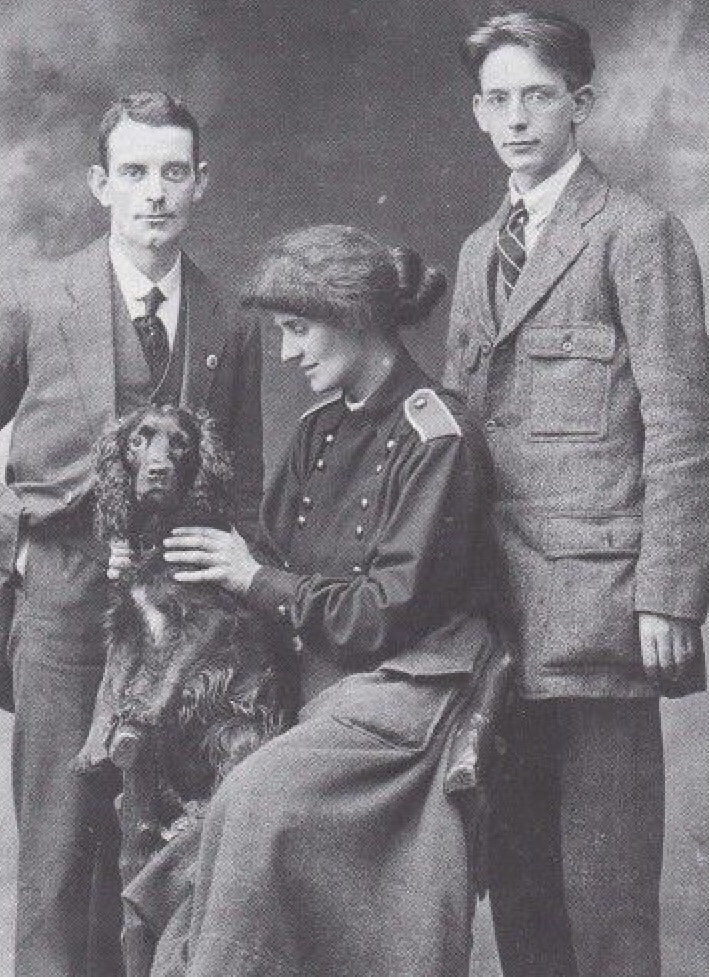
- Countess Markievicz, her dog 'Poppett', Theobald Wolfe Tone FitzGerald (right) and Thomas McDonald (left), members of Na Fianna Éireann, photographed at Waterford in 1917

Personal details
- Born: Theobald Wolfe Tone FitzGerald; 14 June 1898 Dublin City, Ireland
- Died: 27 March 1962 (aged 63) Dublin, Ireland
- Party: Fine Gael; Sinn Féin
- Spouse: Áine Malone
- Awards: 1916 Medal, 1919-1921 Service Medal (Black and Tan Medal)

Military service
- Allegiance: Irish Republic
- Branch/service: Irish Republican Army; Irish Free State
- Years of service: 1913-1924
- Rank: Captain; Commandant (Major)
- Unit: General Head Quarters
- Commands: Commandant Óglaigh na hÉireann/National Forces service number SDR921
- Battles/wars: Easter Rising; Irish War of Independence; Irish Civil War

Theobald Wolfe Tone FitzGerald (14 June 1898 – 27 March 1962) was an Irish army officer and painter. He is recognised for his role in painting the Irish Republic flag that flew over the General Post Office during the Easter Rising 1916. The flag was kept as a trophy by the British Army until it was returned to Ireland during the 1966 commemorations. He was the brother in-law of Lieutenant Michael Malone, who was killed in action at the Battle of Mount Street Bridge during the 1916 Rising, Seán Mac Mahon, the former General Chief of Staff, and the politician Dan Breen.

== Na Fianna ==
FitzGerald was one of "The Row Boys", as was Patrick Pearse, Willie Pearse and his future brother in-laws Lieutenant Michael Malone and General Seán Mac Mahon. They all attended St. Andrew's Christian Brothers School on Westland Row. While a pupil at the school he was one of the founding boys of Na Fianna Éireann, which he, along with his brothers, joined at that first meeting in St. Andrew's CBS in 1909 when Countess Markievicz visited his classroom. Known as the Fianna, it was an Irish nationalist youth organisation founded by Bulmer Hobson and Constance Markievicz in 1909. Fianna members were involved in the setting up of the armed nationalist body the Irish Volunteers, and had their own circle of the Irish Republican Brotherhood (IRB). They took part in the 1914 Howth gun-running and (as Volunteer members) in the 1916 Easter Rising. They were active in the War of Independence and took the anti-Treaty side in the Civil War.

Following the Rising, Theo was on the Fianna reorganizing committee, along with Eamon Martin, Seamus Pounch and Joe Reynolds. Theo was also Captain of Fianna Company No. 5 Harcourt Street from 1916 until January 1917. He later briefly became Commandant of the 2nd Dublin Battalion following the 1917 Fianna Ard Fheis. He was also O/C of the Sean Heuston Sluagh. He served on the Fianna GHQ staff as assistant Director of Training and Organisation.

In December 1919 he resigned from his Fianna duties and he applied for a transfer to the Engineers Battalion of the Dublin Brigade IRA. He was arrested in 1920; he was sent to Dublin Castle, then to Kilmainham, Arbour Hill and finally interned in Ballykinlar. He was released in December 1921. He joined the National Army in 1922 and rose to the rank of Commandant until his demobilization in 1924.

== 1916 Easter Rising ==
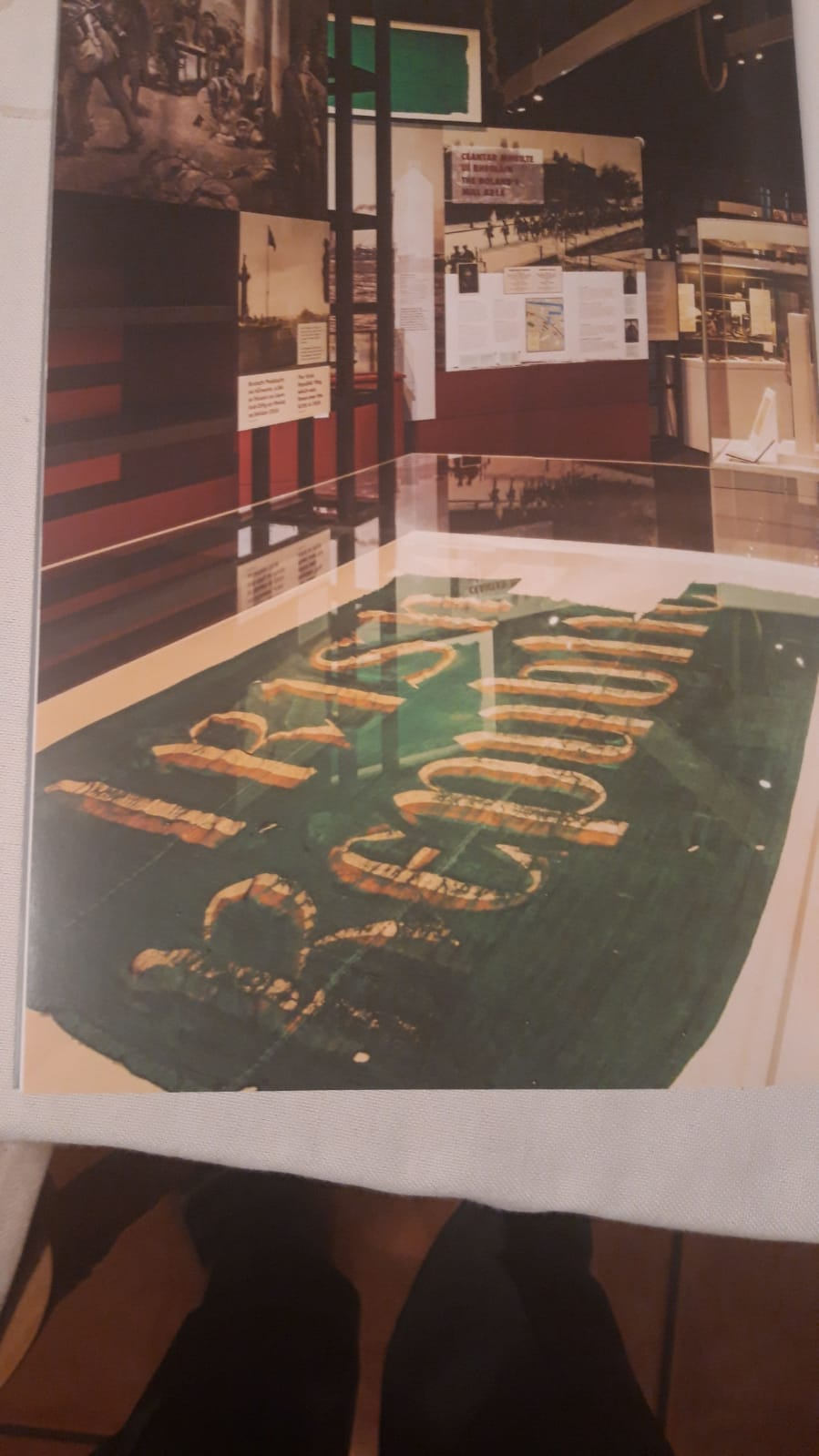
Irish Republic flag in the National Museum of Ireland, Collins Barracks

FitzGerald was a member of Fianna Éireann where he met Countess Constance Markievicz and it was in her house in Rathmines, prior to the Easter Rising that he painted the words "Irish Republic" on a flag that flew over the General Post Office during the fighting between 24 and 29 April 1916. The flag was kept as a trophy by the British Army until it was returned to Ireland during the 1966 commemorations. He and his four brothers William, Thomas, Leo and James fought in the area of Boland’s Mills, Boland’s Bakery during the 1916 Rising under Éamon de Valera. He was detained in Richmond Barracks from the surrender until June 1916.

== War of Independence ==
He served throughout the Irish War of Independence attached to B Company, 3rd Battalion Dublin Brigade serving as Officer Commanding Sluagh Sean Heuston, Fianna Éireann. Battalion Officer Commanding, 2nd Battalion, Dublin Brigade, Fianna Éireann and with the Engineers Battalion and General Headquarters. He took the Pro-Treaty side in the Civil War serving as Commandant Óglaigh na hÉireann/National Forces service number SDR921. He was arrested and interned from December 1920 until December 1921. Before his arrest he took part in a number of attacks and operations including at Kingsbridge Railway Station, Dublin and the capture of Royal Irish Constabulary cars from Archer's, Grand Canal Street, Dublin.

His brother Leo was killed in action on 14 March 1921, aged 31, during the Irish War of Independence, he was part of an IRA unit keeping guard over a meeting attended by Seán MacBride at Saint Andrews Club, 144 Brunswick Street, the meeting was raided by police and he was killed in the ensuing gun battle.

== Free state ==
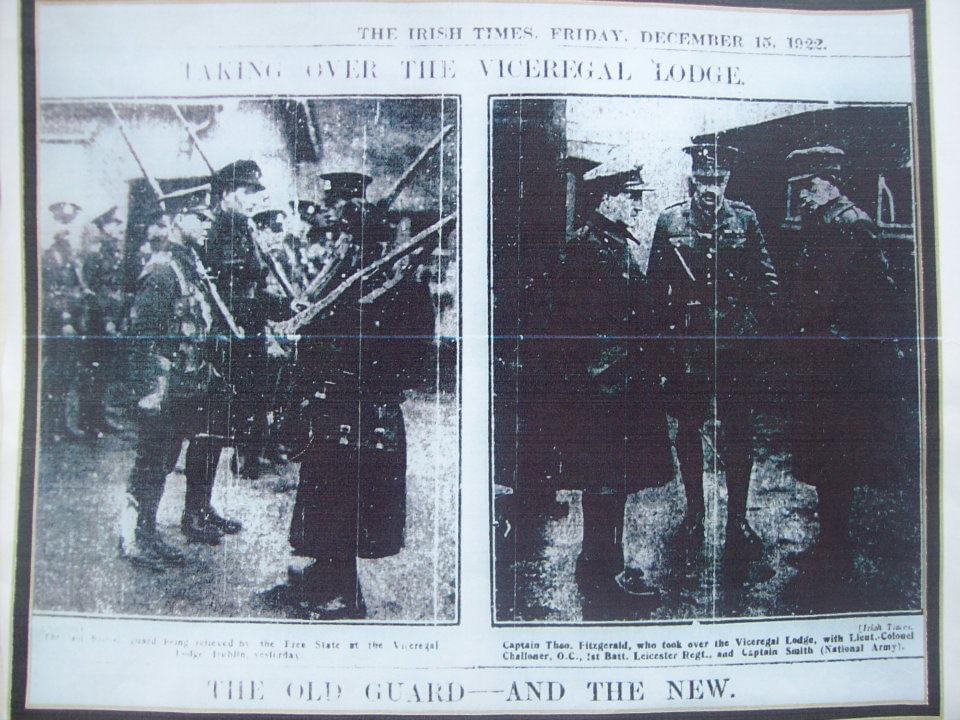
Captain Theo FitzGerald Taking over the Viceregal Lodge, 15 December 1922.

In early 1922 FitzGerald joined the National Army on its formation and as a Captain, he took over the Viceregal Lodge, now known as Áras an Uachtaráin on 15 December 1922 from Lieutenant Colonel Edward Challenor. He continued to serve as a staff officer until his demobilisation from the Defence Forces in March 1924, retiring with the rank of Commandant.

== Personal life ==
FitzGerald married Áine (Annie) Malone, a member of Cumann na mBan and sister of Michael Malone, who was killed in action at the Battle of Mount Street Bridge during the 1916 Easter Rising, they had four children, Theobald, Nuala, Eithne and Míċeál. His sister Lucinda married General Seán Mac Mahon, Chief of General Staff. Áine's sister Brigid married Dan Breen, a volunteer in the Irish Republican Army during the Irish War of Independence. Breen was to become a Teachta Dála (Member of Parliament) for Fianna Fáil.
