= Patrick Whelan =

Irish Volunteer (1893–1916)

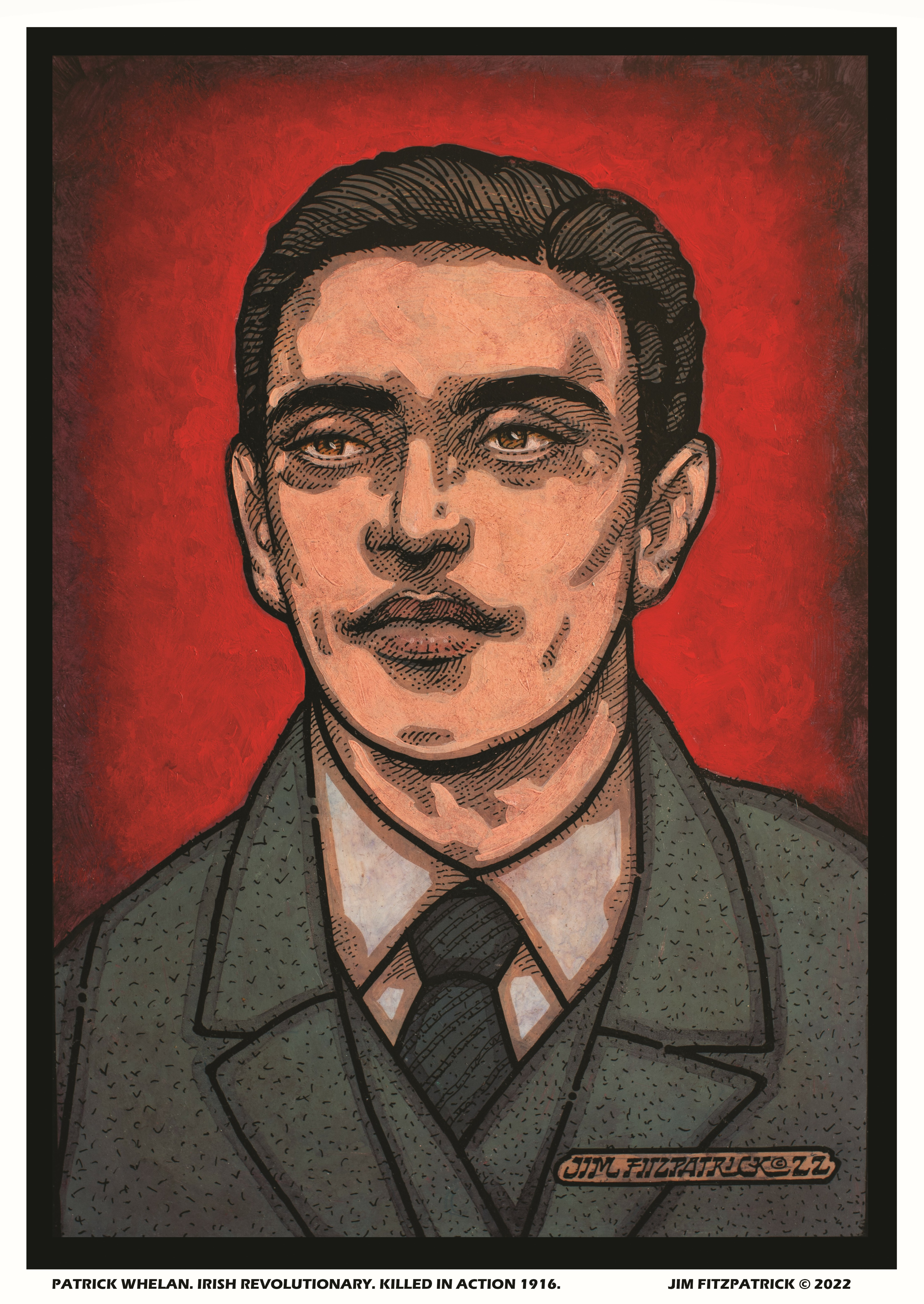
- A portrait of Whelan by Jim Fitzpatrick
- Born: 4 September 1893; 69 Thorncastle Street Ringsend, Dublin
- Died: 26 April 1916 (aged 22); Boland's Mill, Dublin
- Other name: Paddy Whelan
- Occupation: Ship's Carpenter
- Known for: Irish Volunteer killed in action in Boland's Mill during the Easter Rising of 1916. Whelan House, Thorncastle Street, Ringsend, Dublin is named in his honour.

Patrick Whelan (4 September 1893 – 26 April 1916) was an Irish Volunteer, killed in action in Boland's Mill during the Battle of Mount Street Bridge at the time of the Easter Rising of 1916. He was 22 years old when he died and was awarded the 1916 Medal posthumously in 1941. Whelan House in Thorncastle Street, Ringsend, Dublin – where he was born – is named in his honour.

== Early life ==
Patrick Whelan was born on 4 September 1893 to John Whelan, a fisherman, and his wife Mary Jane Mullen, at 69 Thorncastle Street, Ringsend, Dublin. At the time, around the late 1800s, there was an increased interest in the Irish cultural identity, which led to the Gaelic revival movement. Whelan was an active member of the Ringsend Gaelic League, and a renowned hurler who played for Fontenoy's Club in Irishtown. Like many in Ringsend he worked on the ships, where he was employed as a ship's carpenter. Whelan also became a member of the Irish Volunteers and fought and died for Ireland during the Easter Rising of 1916.

Ahead of the Rising, which began at noon on Easter Monday 24 April, Whelan was dispatched to Tralee in County Kerry, only to return with the disheartening news of the capture of Roger Casement and "the bitter denunciation of the Germans" by Robert Monteith.

== Easter Week ==
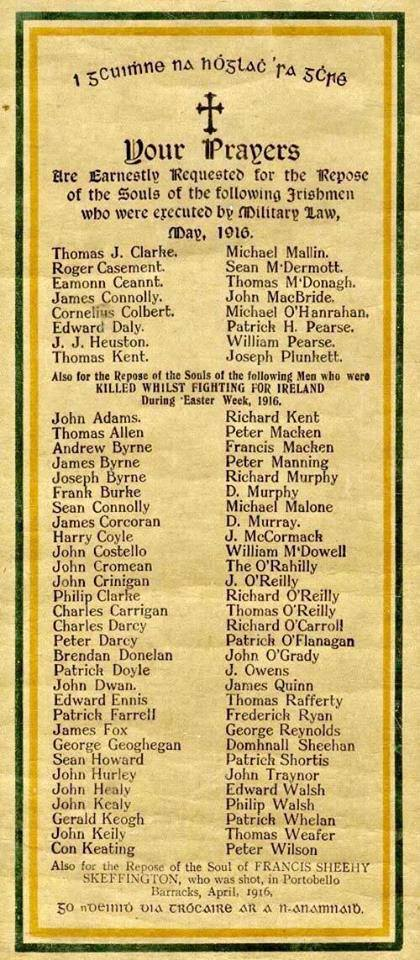
1916 Your Prayers .........

A member of the 3rd Battalion, Unit "D" Company, Dublin Brigade, Whelan fought under Commandant Éamon de Valera. Occupying Boland's Bakery around the corner from the flour mill on Grand Canal Street, and a mile to the south-east of the GPO, the 3rd battalion headquarters was at a key location, controlling as it did the railway line and the main road from Dún Laoghaire (then known as Kingstown) to the centre of the city. Throughout the Rising the 3rd Battalion was to cover a large area of South Dublin, with a lot more men expected to report for duty than actually did so on the day. The severely depleted numbers were the result of countermanding orders issued by Eoin MacNeill advising the Volunteers not to take part in the Rising. MacNeill had learnt of the arrest of Roger Casement and the subsequent loss of German arms. After confronting Patrick Pearse, who refused to be swayed by this revelation, MacNeill felt he had no option but to place a last minute news advertisement calling the Rising off. This caused tremendous confusion among the Volunteers, especially outside of Dublin. For those that did show up, the British, reportedly, "considered De Valera's forces the best trained and best led among the rebels".

Whelan was one of the 14 Volunteers of Unit "D" Company, who occupied Boland's Mill at around noon on Easter Monday.

Tuesday evening at around 6 o'clock we first received attention from the enemy. Two 18-pounder 3 inch shells ripped through the wall of the top loft where the most of my men were stationed, scattering lumps of metal and jagged stones around .... The shells had burst several sacks of flour and bran and the loft was smothered in a fog of flour for quite ten minutes.

— Lieutenant Joseph O'Byrne, Acting Captain of the Unit

In the first artillery fire of the week, Boland's Mill had been shelled by the gunboat "Helga" (now known as the Irish patrol vessel Muirchú) from the river Liffey. The "Helga", which had sailed from Dún Laoghaire earlier, would go on to bombard Liberty Hall the following day. As only the top loft of the mill happened to be in the gunboat's field of fire, Capt. O’Byrne moved his men down to the third floor for safety and because the vantage was just as good from there.

The next day, Wednesday 26 April, soldiers of the Sherwood Foresters Regiment sent to Dún Laoghaire from England, made their way into the city by way of Northumberland Street and Mount Street. Ordered by Major-General William Lowe to take Mount Street Bridge "at all costs", the fighting that ensued there would result in two thirds of British casualties for the entire week, despite the Volunteers being heavily outnumbered. Although the main action of the battle occurred at 25 Northumberland Road and Clanwilliam House, the other outposts of the 3rd Battalion played their part too. According to one witness, Jack O'Shea, "during the battle for Mount Street bridge, fire came towards the mill". Despite being under ‘incessant’ sniping on the Wednesday, the return sniper fire from Boland's Mill and the railway tracks managed to keep the British garrison in nearby Beggars Bush Barracks pinned down that day and throughout Easter week. The Battle of Mount Street Bridge was the most successful military action of the Rising.

== Death and burial ==
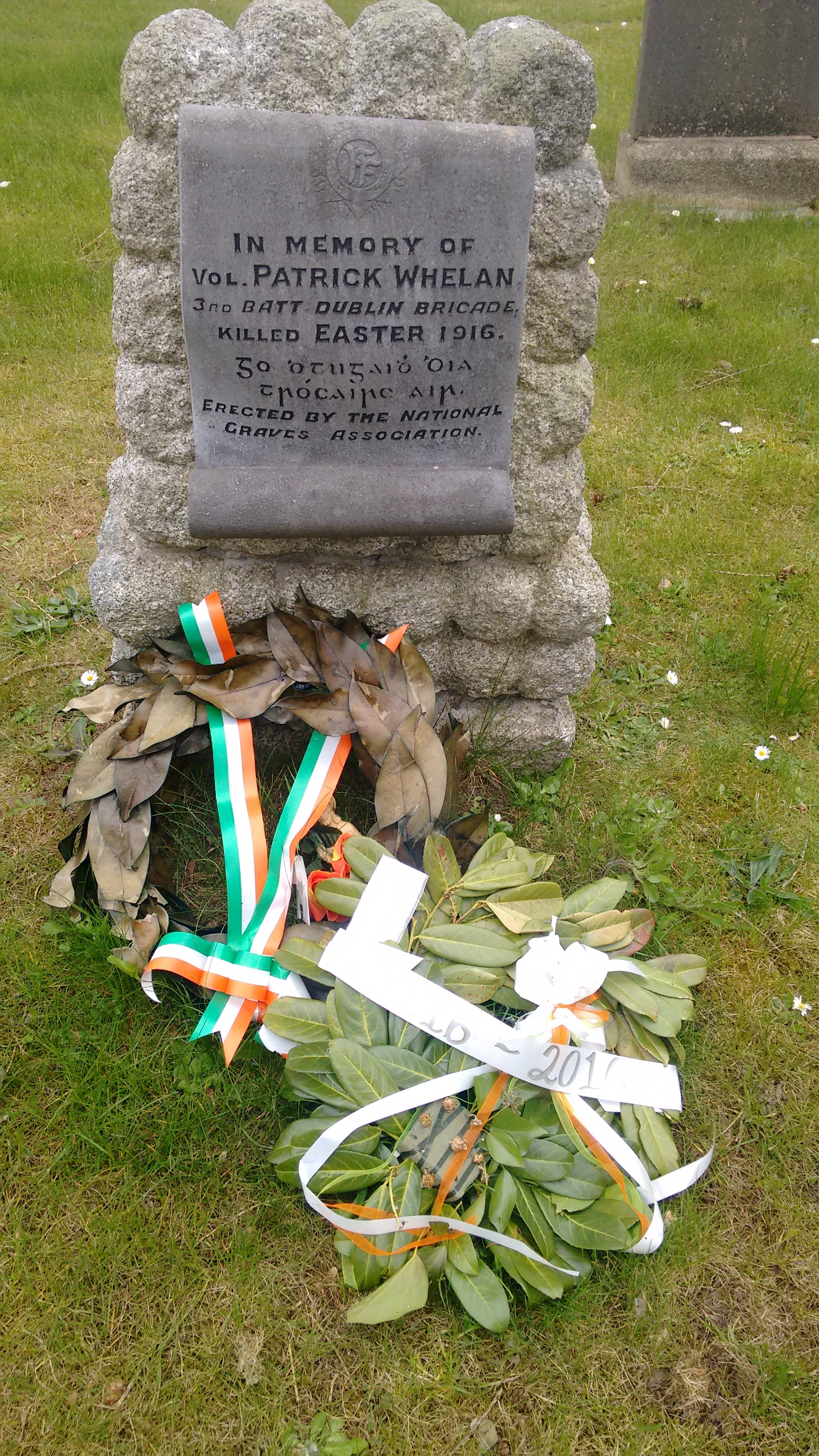
Patrick Whelan Grave, Glasnevin Cemetery, Dublin

As the battle raged, orders came from battalion headquarters to Capt. O’Byrne to direct heavy fire towards Baggot Street Bridge. A party of British soldiers, sent via Sandymount, was advancing from that direction in an attempt to outflank the 3rd Battalion position. The British advance was duly met by a heavy volley of fire from the "D" Unit in Boland's Mill and "driven back in disorder". However, during the exchange, according to the Captain's account, at around 4pm on Wednesday 26 April, Whelan was "fatally wounded beside me, being shot in the head just below the eye. He expired in about a minute". The firing at the Mill was so heavy and the men there so exhausted, that Whelan lay where he fell for over 30 hours.

On Friday morning, Capt. O’Byrne's brother Peter, the Section Commander of Unit "D" and Volunteer Willie Bruen constructed a temporary coffin and buried Whelan's body under a large heap of clinkers in the yard of the building outside the engine room. Although the yard was protected from direct fire, the bullets were still ricocheting off the windows and walls of Boland's Mill as Capt. O’Byrne read some prayers and they all said the Rosary. Peter Byrne wanted to leave a sign to indicate that a body was buried in the yard, but in the confusion and distress of the situation left a sign that read "I.H.S." instead of the "R.I.P" he intended. Boland's Mill remained under sniper fire until the surrender of the Irish Volunteers on Sunday 30 April 1916.

Whelan's body was subsequently buried in Glasnevin Cemetery on 3 May in grave number VB 100 South Section. After consultation with the Whelan family, a memorial stone was erected there by The National Graves Association and unveiled on 24 November 1935.

== Whelan House ==
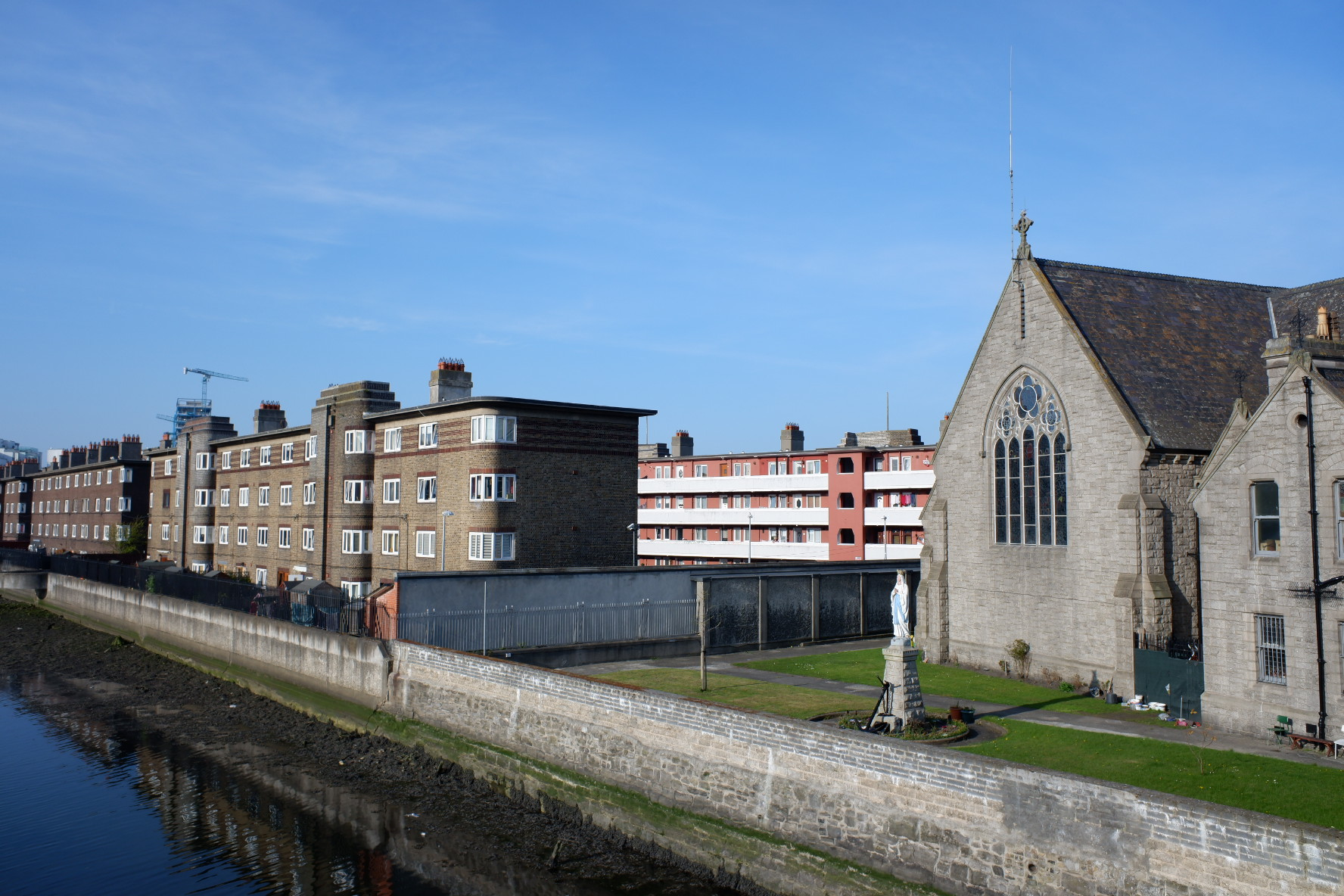
Whelan House, beside St. Patrick's Church, Ringsend, Dublin

Whelan House in Thorncastle Street, Ringsend, the street where Whelan was born, was built in 1936 and named in honour of him. It is located next door to O'Rahilly House, built at the same time in honour of The O'Rahilly. On the other side of Whelan House is St. Patrick's Church in Ringsend, where a statue of Our Lady overlooks the canal. This statue was donated by Patrick's younger brother, Thomas A. Whelan (1 April 1898 – 29 December 1960), who founded the Ringsend branch of the Catholic Young Men's Society (CYMS). The statue, made by Earley and Company (1861–1975) of Camden Street in Dublin, is a memorial to both Patrick and their elder brother Martin Whelan (26 April 1888 – 31 May 1916), who was also killed in action during the Battle of Jutland just five weeks after Patrick, when German gunfire sank HMS Defence.
