= Treasury Building =

Treasury Building may refer to:

- Treasury Building, Adelaide, in Victoria Square, Adelaide
- Treasury Building, Brisbane, Australia
- Old Treasury Building, Melbourne, Australia
- Treasury Building, Sydney, Australia
- Treasury Building (Washington, D.C.), United States
- Treasury Building (Dublin), Ireland
