= Nicholas Donnelly =

Nicholas Donnelly may refer to:

- Nicholas Donnelly (bishop), Roman Catholic auxiliary bishop of Dublin
- Nicholas Donnelly (actor), British actor
- Nick Donnelly, British filmmaker and author
