= Alto Vetro =

Apartment block on the western side of Grand Canal Dock

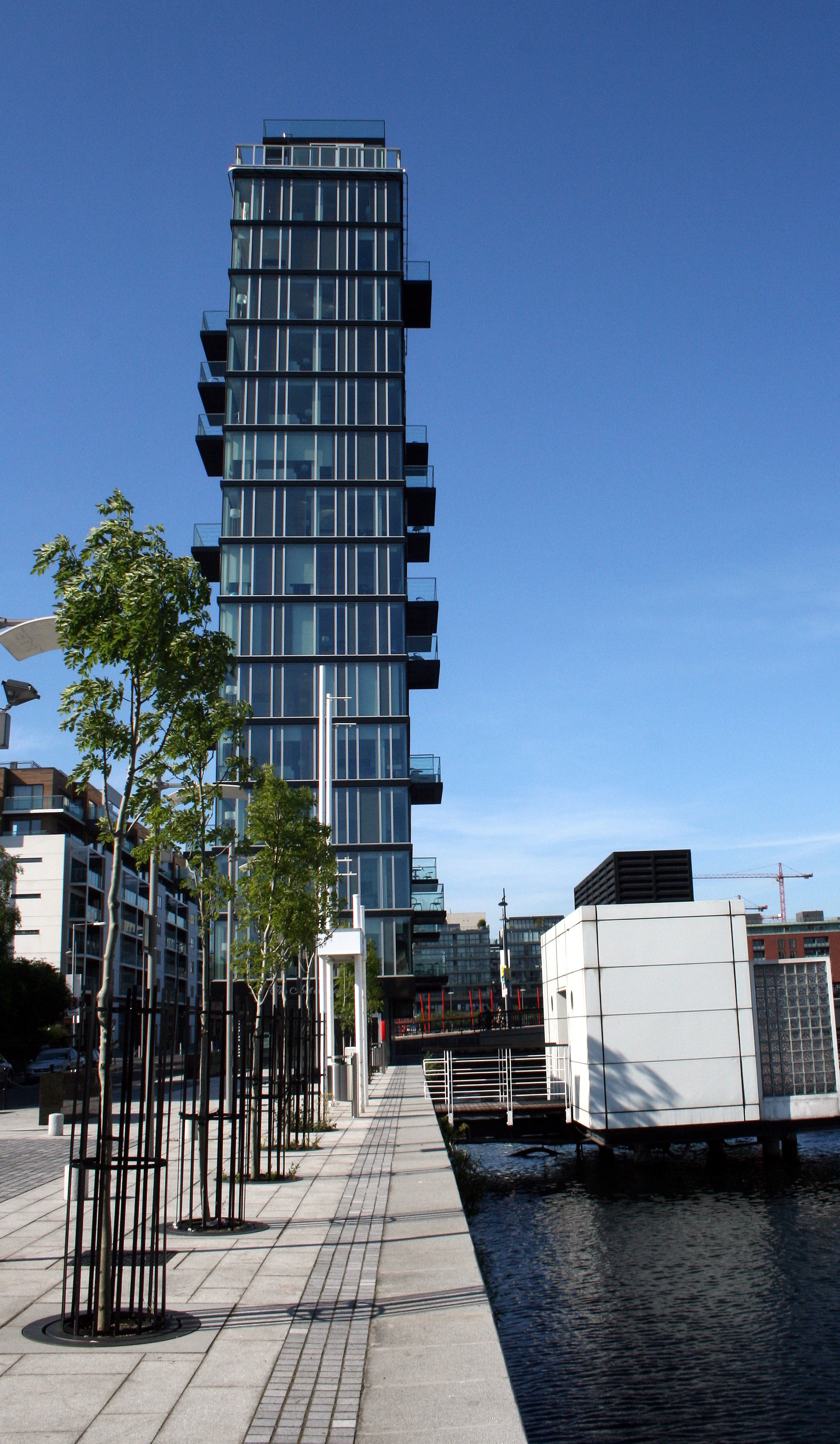
- Interactive map of the Alto Vetro area

General information
- Location: Alto Vetro; Grand Canal Dock; Grand Canal Quay; Dublin 2, Ireland
- Coordinates: 53.34224°N 6.23868°W
- Completed: 2009
- Owner: Kennedy Wilson

Height
- Height: 51 m (167 ft)

Technical details
- Floor count: 16
- Floor area: 2,610 / 28,094 ft²

Design and construction
- Architecture firm: Shay Cleary
- Developer: Johnny Ronan
- Main contractor: Sisk Group
- Known for: 17:1 plot ratio, the highest in Ireland

Alto Vetro is a 16-storey residential tower on the west side of Grand Canal Dock, to the south of MacMahon Bridge, in Dublin, Ireland. The structure contains 26 apartments, 24 of them two-bedroom (2 per floor), the top two being three-bedroom triplex penthouses. There is a coffee shop and barbers at ground floor level.

It was awarded the Royal Institute of the Architects of Ireland’s (RIAI) Silver Medal for Housing (2007–2008). It was constructed by Sisk on behalf of developers Treasury Holdings which also developed the headquarters of Google, Montevetro, on Barrow Street across the canal basin from Alto Vetro. That building has since been renamed Google Docks. A third structure in the series, Aqua Vetro, was to be developed at Tara Street railway station, however this building had not started construction at the time the company entered insolvency.

In 2014 Alto Vetro was sold by receivers from PwC appointed by NAMA and was acquired by Kennedy Wilson Europe.
