= Treasury Building (Dublin) =

Office block on historic bakery site, Dublin, Ireland

- Interactive map of the Treasury Building area
- Former names: Boland's Bakery

General information
- Location: Treasury Building, Grand Canal Street, Dublin 2, Dublin, Ireland
- Coordinates: 53.33952°N 6.24078°W
- Current tenants: Google
- Owner: Google

Technical details
- Floor count: 6

Design and construction
- Developer: Johnny Ronan and Treasury Holdings

The Treasury Building is an office block and historic site at the corner of Grand Canal Street Lower and Macken Street in Dublin.

The site used to be the main site for Boland's Bakery and site was occupied during the Easter Rising by Éamon de Valera. During the late 1980s, the building was redeveloped by Treasury Holdings. The building was stripped back to a concrete structure and converted into offices.

Rowan Gillespie was commissioned to create a sculpture for the outside wall of the building. The statue, named 'Aspiration', was originally of a naked man climbing the outside wall, but Johnny Ronan insisted that the sculpture be changed to a woman. The statue was made of fibreglass. The sculpture was removed in 2020 when the building was sold.

The building was used by Fianna Fáil as their headquarters for the 2007 election.

After the Post-2008 Irish economic downturn, the Irish government created the National Asset Management Agency (NAMA) as a bad bank to deal with the collapse of the property bubble in Ireland. In 2011 the registered office of NAMA was the Treasury building.

Google bought the building from Ronan Group Real Estate in February 2020. In February 2022 Dublin City Council granted planning permission to Google Ireland to increase the height of the building from six to eight storeys.
