= Louisa Nolan =

Irish female Military Medal recipient

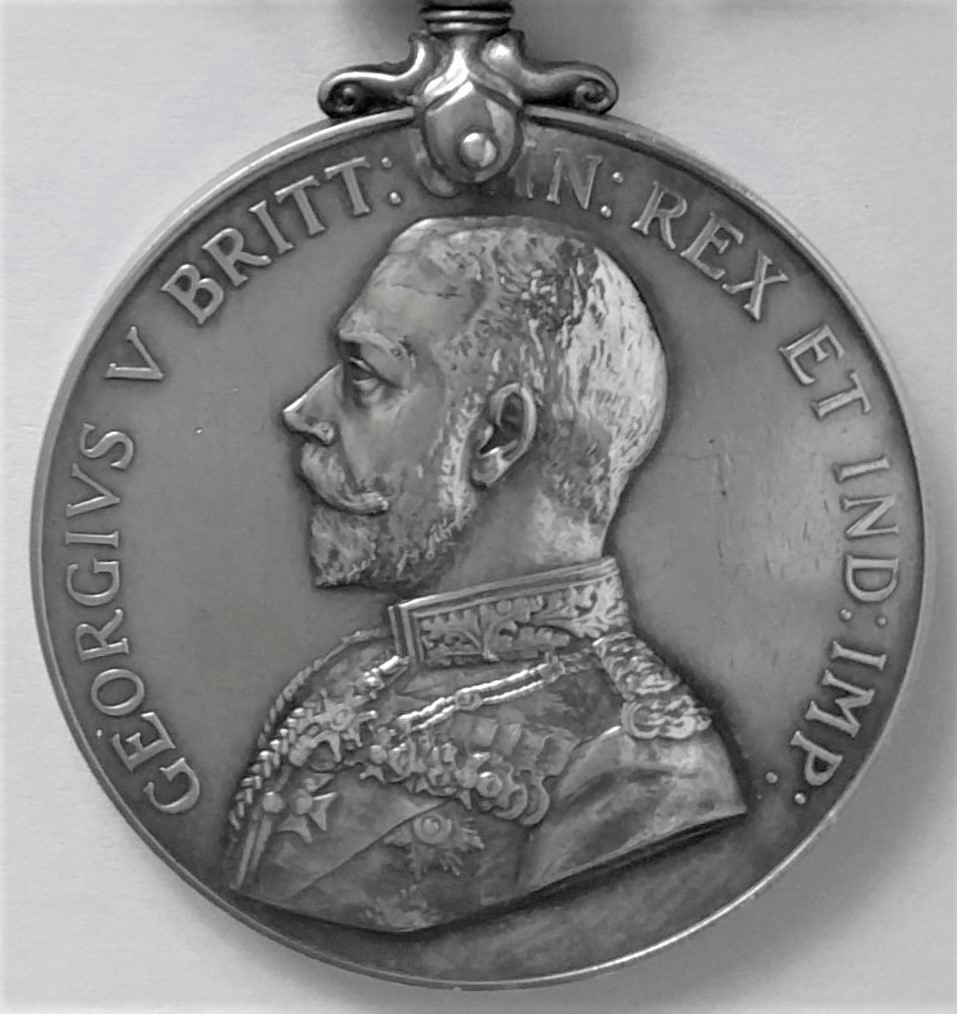
- Military Medal, close up of disc

Louisa Nolan MM (1898–?) was an Irish woman recognized with the Military Medal by King George V for her bravery and humanitarian aid during the Easter Rising in Dublin, Ireland in 1916.

== Early life ==
Nolan was the daughter of ex-Head Constable Nolan of the Royal Irish Constabulary. She had two sisters, who became nurses, and three brothers, one of whom died in World War I. The family resided in Ringsend, Dublin. As a teenager, Nolan appeared as a chorus girl at the Gaiety Theatre, Dublin.

== Easter Rising ==
During the Easter Rising in Dublin, Britain sent reinforcements to Dublin to prevent rebels fighting for Irish independence from overtaking the city. They disembarked at Kingstown on the morning of Wednesday 26 April and heavy fighting occurred at the rebel-held positions around the Grand Canal as these troops advanced towards Dublin. More than 1,000 Sherwood Foresters were repeatedly caught in a cross-fire trying to cross the canal at Mount Street Bridge. Seventeen Volunteers were able to severely disrupt the British advance, killing or wounding 240 men. Despite there being alternative routes across the canal nearby, General Lowe ordered repeated frontal assaults on the Mount Street position. The British eventually took the position, which had not been reinforced by the nearby rebel garrison at Boland's Mills, on Thursday, but the fighting there in inflicted up to two thirds of their casualties for the entire week .

During the Battle of Mount Street Bridge, Nolan provided humanitarian aid to the wounded. According to the Sinn Féin Rebellion handbook (pg. 259), she tended to 'wounded officers and men' while the battle was unfolding. She "went calmly through a hail of bullets and carried water and other comforts to the wounded men."

On 24 February 1917, King George V honored her at Buckingham Palace with the Medal for Heroism during Easter Week, 1916. Her award read: "For conspicuous gallantry in the vicinity of the Canal Bridge, Lower Mount Street, Dublin, on the afternoon of the 26th April, 1916, in going out under heavy fire to attend to a wounded officer. Her gallant example inspired other civilians to assist her and the Officer was through Miss Nolan's initiative, removed to cover. Miss Nolan remained under fire for nearly three hours assisting Doctors and Nurses in removing wounded to places of safety." News of her courage and sacrifice was sent to the U.S., where a Chicago newspaper dubbed her 'Ireland's Bravest Colleen.' . Louisa Nolan was among only 150 women to be awarded the British Military Medal, an honor that recognizes valor on the battlefield. The medal is now on display at the National Museums Northern Ireland.

In 2016 Ireland further recognized Nolan for risking her life to help others, introducing a stamp in her honour as part of a series to mark the centenary of the Easter Rising.

== Later life ==
After the Easter Rising, Nolan pursued her theatre career in London, starring in the Harry Lauder revue, Three Cheers, at the Shaftesbury Theatre.
