= Mount Street Lower =

Street in central Dublin, Ireland

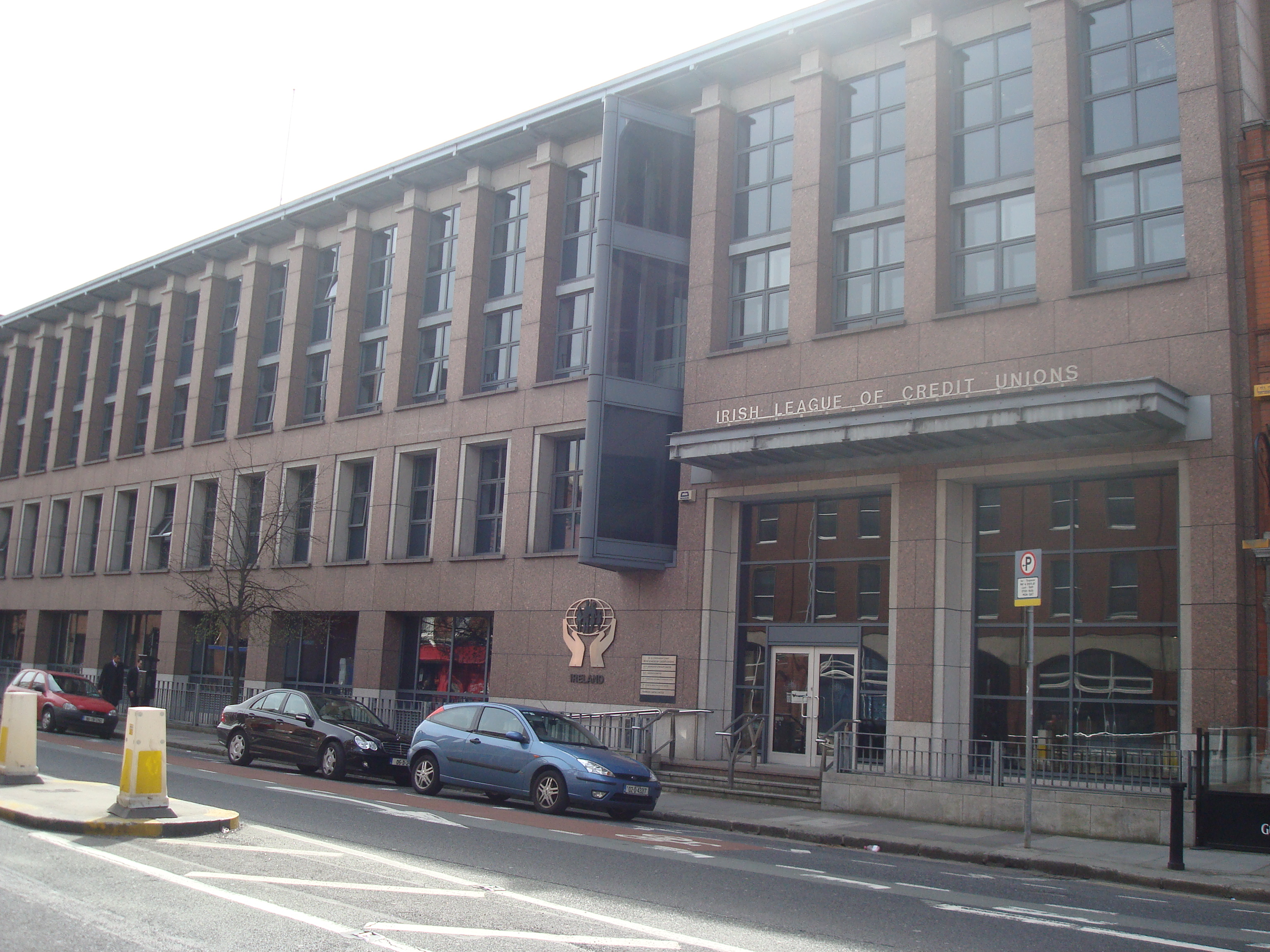
- Irish League of Credit Unions on Mount Street Lower
- Interactive map of Mount Street Lower
- Native name: Sráid an Mhóta Íochtarach (Irish)
- Namesake: The mount of Gallows Hill which lay nearby
- Postal code: D02
- Coordinates: 53.3385759°N 6.2452993°W
- northwest end: Merrion Square, North
- southeast end: Grand Canal, McKenny's Bridge

Other
- Known for: Georgian architecture

Mount Street Lower (Irish: Sráid an Mhóta Íochtarach) is a street in Dublin, Ireland laid out during the 1780s.

== Location ==
The street runs from Merrion Square to McKenny Bridge over the Grand Canal which connects the street with Northumberland Road. Mount Street Upper runs parallel to the street to its south.

The street is intersected by a number of junctions including Grattan Street, Grant's Row, Love Lane, Love Lane East, Verschoyle Place and Stephen's Place.

== History ==
The street was laid out initially in 1780 by the architect Samuel Sproule for Richard FitzWilliam, 7th Viscount FitzWilliam. One of the first houses at number 64 was a large double-fronted house for George Putland in 1783. However, it wasn't until 1791 that approval was obtained from the Wide Streets Commission to develop the street proper as a thoroughfare.

Some of the first houses were developed by Crosthwaite and Grant, who acquired lots for building from Samuel Sproule. The buildings were grand and initially well received, but construction paused in the mid-1790s and following the economic stagnation that followed the Acts of Union 1800, did not resume until the middle of the first decade of the 19th century. From that point on, development progressed with more modest houses of mostly two bays extending gradually towards the Grand Canal.

By the time a Plan of Dublin was produced in 1818 by Walsh, Warburton and Whitelaw, all of the lots on the street as far down as the junction with Love Lane East and Verschoyle Place had been built upon. Sir Patrick Dun's Hospital had also been built on nearby Grand Canal Street in the interim period which gave added activity to the area on the East side of the street.

The street was to be the original terminus for the Dublin and Kingstown Railway when first proposed in 1825. However, it was later decided to site the terminus at Westland Row.

There were 29 houses recorded on the street by 1834. All houses were completed around the same time that construction started on the first houses on Northumberland Road on the far side of the Grand Canal Bridge around 1835.

Only a small number of the original Georgian houses have survived until 2024, numbers 1–6, 15–18, 31-32, 64 and 94-95. All of which are protected structures with the exception of 31-32 and 94-95.

=== Easter rising ===
During the events of the Easter Rising, one of the more successful battles for the Irish volunteers (the Battle of Mount Street Bridge) took place at the bridge, now known as McKenny's Bridge.

=== 20th century redevelopment ===
By the mid-20th century, the houses were largely tenements, which housed a large inner-city community.

The whole street was later rezoned for offices and as none of the houses were listed as protected structures until the year 2000, over sixty Georgian houses on the street were eventually demolished in the interim.

The first office block was Prizebond House which replaced a terrace of 9 houses, one of which had belonged to Neil Goold-Verschoyle. Prizebond House was designed by M. W. Design in Cheshire, and was completed in 1970. Bridge House (later Lombard and Ulster House) and Ferry House were both designed by Burke-Kennedy Doyle for Dodder Properties. The same company developed Clanwilliam Court, on the site of Clanwilliam House which had been destroyed during the battle in 1916. The complex was built between 1974 and 1978, with 6 office blocks designed by Austin Murray.

Of the modern office blocks, the most notable include the 1991 buildings at 65-66 by Andrej and Danuta Wejchert and an office block at 67-72 designed by Stephenson Gibney & Associates for the Irish Diary Board in 1972.
