= Battle of Mount Street Bridge =

1916 battle in Dublin

- Part of the Easter Rising
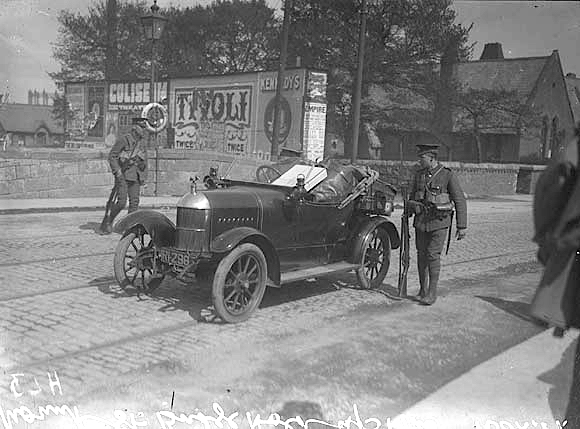
- Soldiers inspecting a car on the bridge in May 1916
Date	26 April 1916
Location	Mount Street Bridge, Dublin, Ireland
Result	British victory

Belligerents
Army of the Irish Republic: Irish Volunteers	(United Kingdom of Great Britain and Ireland) British forces: British Army

Commanders and leaders
Lt. Michael Malone	Col. Ernest Maconchy

Strength
17	1,750

Casualties and losses
4 killed	216, including 28 killed

The Battle of Mount Street Bridge was fought on 26 April 1916 between the British Army and Irish rebels during the Easter Rising. It took place in Dublin at the southern end of Mount Street Lower where it meets the Grand Canal.

== Background ==
On 24 April 1916, Easter Monday, after Éamon de Valera headed his Volunteers' contingent into Boland's Bakery, another group of 17 Volunteers was sent to secure the Dún Laoghaire road to stall anticipated British reinforcements. The 17 volunteers were distributed around Mount Street Bridge: 25 Northumberland Road was initially occupied by four Volunteers, although two were dismissed home for being too young; four Volunteers occupied the Parochial Hall, seven Volunteers held Clanwilliam House, and two were stationed in the Schoolhouse. On 26 April, a female dispatcher informed that nearly 2,000 British soldiers had landed at Dún Laoghaire and that the Robin Hood Battalion, the 7th Battalion Sherwood Foresters, was heading towards them.

== Battle ==
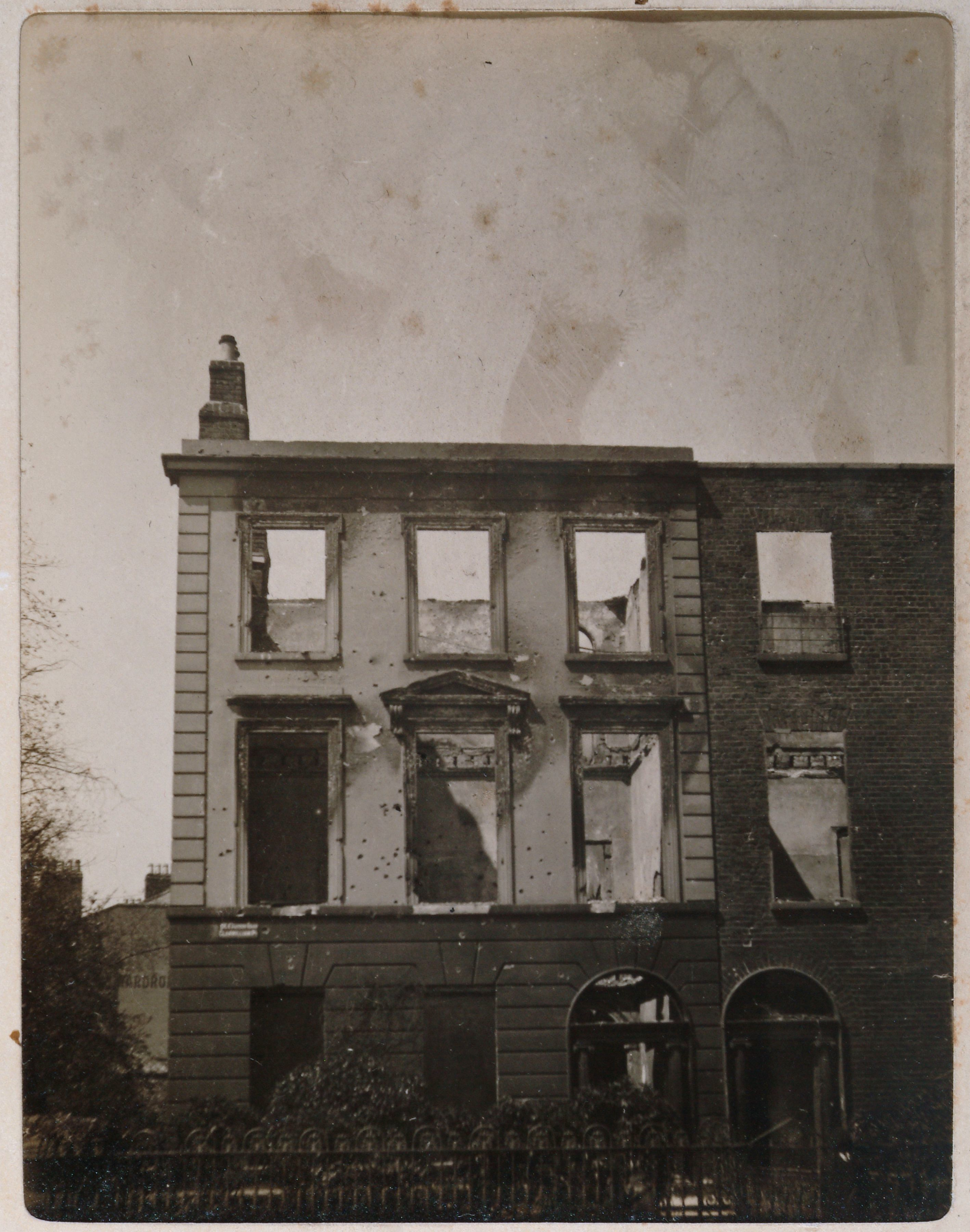
Clanwilliam Place, Mount Street, May 17 1916

The advancing British stopped at Carisbrook House and learned about the Volunteers' presence in the area, responding to sniper fire. The column came under fire from the two men in 25 Northumberland Road, and it took the British five hours of continued firing to dislodge them from the building. Volunteers in the other buildings nearby also shot at exposed British forces. The Volunteers held the bridge against British forces for nine hours. The battle resulted in the biggest losses to both the British Army and the rebels during the uprising; the Sherwood Foresters suffered 216 casualties, including 28 dead, while four Volunteers were killed in the action: Dick Murphy, George Reynolds, Michael Malone and Patrick Doyle.

== In popular culture ==
The battle is depicted in the docudrama television series Insurrection.

== See also ==
- Joe Clarke
- Louisa Nolan
- Patrick Whelan, killed at Boland's Mill during the battle
