= Seán MacMahon =

Irish nationalist and soldier (1893–1955)

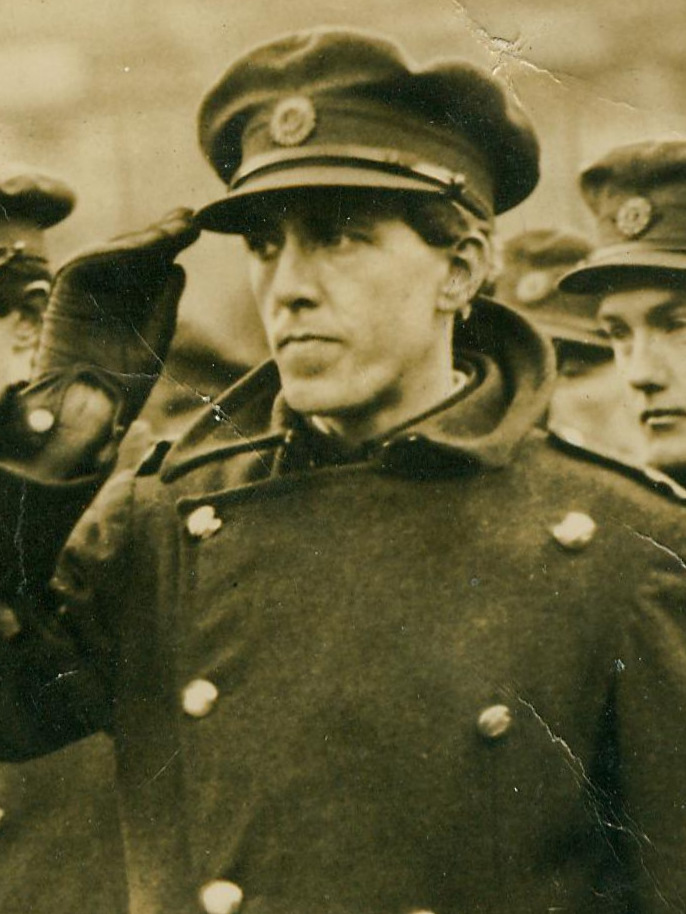
- MacMahon in Irish Army uniform
- Born: 15 September 1893. 118 Cork Street, Dublin
- Died: 26 March 1955 (aged 61)
- Occupation: Nationalist
- Known for: Fought in the 1916 Rising

Seán MacMahon (born John Michael McMahon, Irish: Seán Mac Mathúna; 15 September 1893 – 26 March 1955) was an Irish nationalist who fought in the 1916 rising as captain of "B" Company, 3rd Battalion, Irish Volunteers, under Éamon de Valera. He later became quartermaster-general of the IRA. MacMahon took the pro-treaty side in the Irish Civil War (1922–23) and rose to be chief of staff of the Irish Defence Forces. He was also president of the Irish Republican Brotherhood.

== Early life ==
McMahon was born on Friday 15 September 1893 at 118 Cork Street in Dublin. His mother was Mary, formerly Delaney, and his father, Edward McMahon, was almost 25. He was the eldest of 7 children, with 4 brothers and 2 sisters: Pat (Patrick) born 23 July 1897, the twins Ned (Edward) and Tom (Thomas) born on 4 December 1902 and Joe (Joseph) born 7 July 1909. The girls were Annie, born 21 September 1895 and Kathleen (Catherine) born 9 November 1900.

After leaving school on 26 September 1907, just 11 days after his 14th birthday, MacMahon started work in Dublin Post Office. He left on 17 September 1909, having reached the age limit of 16.

He then turned to clerical work, perhaps at Plunkett Brothers where his father worked, for he gave 5 Sandwith Street as his address when later interned in 1916.

== Revolutionary activities ==
=== Irish Volunteers and Easter Rising ===
At the inception of the Volunteers in 1913 MacMahon was enrolled as a member of "B" Company, 3rd Battalion, Dublin City Brigade, at 144 Great Brunswick Street (now Pearse Street). In 1914 he became 1st lieutenant under The O'Rahilly with promotion to captain, replacing The O'Rahilly in 1915.

He represented "B" Company at a meeting of the battalion council on the Good Friday prior to the rising. Present were de Valera, Captain Begley, Lieutenant Byrne, Lieutenant Charlie Murphy and Joseph O'Connor. They were given precise orders as to the positions they were to occupy on the Sunday. They were informed as to the quantity of stores at their disposal. A large quantity of provisions had been purchased. Each company was to be responsible for the collection of such stores and their transport to their operational area. MacMahon was given responsibility for Westland Row train station. His company was to take over Westland Row Railway Station and send a party up to Tara Street to link up with 2nd Battalion in the Amiens Street section of the railway. They were on the other side to connect up with "A" Company on the railway at Grand Canal Quay.

B Company cleared, barricaded and locked Westland Row station, cut telephone wires and seized signal boxes. They were charged to snipe and fight running battles around the railway so as to maintain control of it. Ensuring that any reinforcements landing at Kingstown (Dún Laoghaire) would have to march to Dublin. MacMahon then sabotaged part of the line and entrenched his men about 300 yards away from the station. As the railway ran through de Valera's command area, MacMahon was one of the two "best officers" to whom its defence was entrusted.

On Monday near Bath Avenue MacMahon and seven of his men repelled soldiers from Beggars Bush Barracks and killed a sergeant major. The Volunteer marksmen attacked British soldiers from behind the nine stone archways between Westland Row and Ringsend and shot at them on Great Brunswick Street and Grand Canal Street, as well as in the square of Beggars Bush Barracks. When one of his own men was seriously wounded, MacMahon took him to St Vincent's Hospital himself while in uniform and under fire from the British troops.

Towards the end of the fighting de Valera, based in Boland's Mill, ordered the burning of Westland Row station but was persuaded by MacMahon not to do so: it would have most likely led also to the burning of St Andrews Church next door on Westland Row. This story is passed down through the MacMahon family: "By Thursday/Friday he was exhausted: 'I can't trust the men – they'll leave their posts if I fall asleep, if I don't watch them. 'When Lt James Fitzgerald assured his O/C he'd sit by him de Valera relented and fell asleep immediately. Soon he awoke screaming. 'set fire to the railway!" De Valera insisted that papers be dipped in whiskey and used to set fore to the waiting rooms and rolling stock, but another officer, Cpt John Mc Mahon, O/C of B Company, 'eventually persuaded de Valera to reason and the fires were put out.

After the surrender of the garrison in Boland's Mills, the reaction by local people was unlike that of most other areas. They were friendly and sympathetic and the defeated men received an ovation in Grand Canal Street with offers of refuge. They were met by British officers and soldiers in Grattan Street, where they laid down their weapons. The men marched into Lower Mount Street through lines of bayonets.

MacMahon was imprisoned first in Wakefield then Frongoch, where he was listed as John McMahon, 5B Sandwith Street, and finally Wormwood Scrubbs. Leo, Thomas and James Fitzgerald of 173 Great Brunswick Street (Pearse Street), his future brothers-in-law, were also interned in Frongoch as were Michael Collins and Richard Mulcahy.The Irish Republican Brotherhood was also being reorganised in Frongoch.

In September it was suggested that a patch of ground be cultivated. MacMahon and two others, "being city men," asked to be shown how to do it and eventually admitted: "Put us in the clink we won't be doing any work". MacMahon was one of 15 hut leaders court-martialled after the Murphy incident of 2 November. He was defended by Gavin Duffy and sentenced to 28 days hard labour, but served only six.

After the British government amnesty he arrived home on Christmas Eve 1916 via Dún Laoghaire and was employed as a clerk on the managerial staff of the Nationality, Arthur Griffith's newspaper. MacMahon resumed his service with the Volunteers, becoming vice commandant of the 3rd Battalion.

=== South Longford by-election ===
Griffith sent MacMahon and Joseph Curran to Longford to work for the imprisoned Joseph McGuinness' election on a Sinn Féin ticket in the South Longford by-election of May 1917. The election slogan developed was "Put him in to get him out!" and McGuinness was elected to Westminster. MacMahon commented: "We converted the hostile people who tried hard to beat us out of Newtownforbes."

In late 1917, after a 26-man Volunteer executive was established, it was decided to set up a headquarters staff. "Seven of the most prominent members of the resident executive met at the headquarters of the printers union at 35 Lower Gardener Street to select a chief of staff in March 1918. Those attending were Collins, Richard Mulcahy, Dick McKee, Gearóid O'Sullivan, Diarmuid O'Hegarty, Rory O'Connor and Seán MacMahon". In 1919 MacMahon became quartermaster-general of the IRA, as the Volunteers had now come to be known.

=== Irish Republican Army ===
MacMahon was the organiser of the famous Q Company based at Dublin Docks, which was finally organised into a unit in March 1921. John Kennedy was transferred from "B" Company, 3rd Battalion, Dublin Brigade, to his department to help run it. He also found time to organise the Volunteers at the various railway stations both in Dublin and throughout the country.

On another occasion, about this time, the British military carried out a raid on a business premises in Stephen's Green. Every room in the building with the exception of two were searched. One of these was the QMG's War Office.

Many meetings took place in Whelan's Pub at 49 Parnell Street. Owned and run by James Kirwan from Tipperary. He was a member of "D" Company 2nd Battalion, Dublin Brigade. Whenever there was an important meeting being held in the snug Richard Mulcahy would preside with MacMahon, Gearoid O Sullivan, Frank Thorton, Seán O’Connell, Michael Larken and of course Oscar Traynor these men were always present. Mick Collins was always in and out, keeping much of his funds hidden here. £3,000 at one time behind a brick in the wall of the cellar. Often used to buy arms. It was here that the escape from Kilmainham Gaol and of Sean Mac Eoin from Mountjoy were planned.

Pax Whelan recalled a meeting of February 1921: "I was at a HQ meeting in a house on the quays. All the top people were there, Mick, Liam Mellows who was director of purchases, Cathal Brugha Minister for Defence, Rory O' Connor, Seán MacMahon Q.M.G., Liam Lynch and some others. They were discussing whether to bring in a boat with arms"

He took part in several engagements during the Black and Tan war and was present during the night ambush when his Brother in Law, Leo Fitzgerald was killed in Great Brunswick Street on 14 March 1921.

Dublin awoke on the morning to 14 March 1921 to the news that six IRA mens, captured in an ambush at Drumcondra two months before, had been hanged.

The Labour movement called a half-day general strike in the city in protest at the hangings. The Republican government declared a day of national mourning. All public transport came to a halt.

By the evening, the streets cleared rapidly as the British-imposed curfew came into effect at 9pm each night. It was about 8 o’clock. The curfew was approaching. A company of Auxiliaries, based in Dublin Castle was sent to the area to investigate an explosion. It consisted of one Rolls-Royce armoured car and two tenders (trucks) holding about 16 men. Apparently the Auxiliaries had some inside information as they made straight for the local IRA headquarters at 144 Pearse Street. One later testified in court that – "I had been notified there were a certain number of gunmen there". Leo, with others, was protecting his brother in law and other senior staff attending a meeting. As soon as the Auxiliaries approached the building, fire was opened on them from three sides. Firing lasted for just five minutes but in that time seven people were killed or fatally wounded and at least six more wounded. Leo Fitzgerald was killed outright.

== Treaty and Civil War ==
The Treaty was signed on 6 December 1921.

On the formation of the Regular Army in February 1922 he continued as Q.M.G.

When Michael Collins was shot in Béal na Blá and buried in Dublin, MacMahon help carry the coffin from St Vincents Hospital Dublin to the waiting gun carriage. Michael Collins brother gave him the handkerchief that was on Collins' person when he was shot.

In September 1922 he succeeded General Mulcahy as Chief of the General Staff. He was unknown not only to the Irish public but also to the British at Dublin Castle. At a reunion in Gormanstown in September 1922 General Mulcahy boasted of the great progress of the Army by indicating the newly appointed Chief of Staff as "the Army's first real Chief of Staff"

The Army needed to be professionalised, armed and numbers increased in the short term. After the civil war ended it would have to be brought to peacetime operation and numbers reduced again.

Trouble continued in Northern Ireland with violence against the Catholics. It was considered important to continue to supply and arm the Northern Ireland IRA units. To this end the Free State Army sanctioned the surreptitious purchase of arms from a London arms dealer.

In May 1923 MacMahon summed up the course of events "Early last year (1922), during the programme in the North and when our men in the Northern Divisions were making every effort to deal with the situation, the demand for arms increased and every weapon we could lay our hands on was sent to one of our Northern divisions. Arms were taken from Southern units and sent up North and later we supplied them with some arms from the regular army. The position became very difficult and, after many meetings with our Northern officers, it was decided that we would procure a quantity of arms under cover to be sent in to the six counties. I went into the matter of procuring a quantity of revolvers and rifles with Mr Frank Fitzgerald (Uncle to Gareth Fitzgerald), who has been procuring materials for us for a long time…"

This deal went badly wrong with Frank Fitzgerald. General MacMahon approved the deal and an advance of £10,000 was given out of Army funds. The revolvers were due at the end of June 1922 however the attack to retake the Customs House was on 28, 29 and 30 June 1922. MacMahon was in Cork at this time and told Fitzgerald to hold things up because he was concerned that the guns may get into the wrong hands.

Things began to go badly wrong in London at the end of August 1922 and it seems that Fitzgerald may have been a rather incompetent gunrunner. He messed up one revolver deal in June by not turning up for an appointment with the arms dealer who then sold the guns to Brazil. Everything fell apart. The Free State authorities no longer had the same need for the arms having won the civil war. But whatever pressure Fitzgerald put on it was effective (He had a brother in the Cabinet and was friendly with Mulcahy and Ernest Blyth).

On 19 October 1923 Mulcahy and MacMahon had a meeting with W.T. Cosgrave (President of the Executive Council). Mulcahy and other Ministers went to the Dept of Finance and drew out £5,000 Then Mulcahy and MacMahon caught the night boat to England to see Fitzgerald. They brokered a deal and gave him the money. Needless to say the saga continued on with the Free State threatening legal action. Some arms were received but the Cosgrave government tried to distance itself from the situation. The last word on the matter was in the Dáil in 1927 when Fianna Fáil's Frank Carney TD (Chief supplies officer Portobello 1922) commented that they fitted out a flying column from South Down/Armagh area two or three days before the attack on the Four Courts. They had been waiting on the guns from London.

On 4 November 1922 Ernie O'Malley was arrested and brought, severely wounded, to Portobello. MacMahon went privately to visit him and hoped that the prisoner would not die.

Even before the end of the civil war in 1923 it was evident that the leadership of the National Army or "Defence Force" saw a future where they were a respected, professional, well organised army, subservient to the government of the day. That Government was following the agreement with Britain and had concerns about its military budget. At the beginning of 1923 the National Army accounted one third of all current budget expenditure by the state. The leadership of the IRA organisation wished to continue the fight for an all island Republic using whatever means but particularly a well-armed nationalist army. While the Free State government wished to shrink the National Army now that the civil war was over. Mulcahy met this IRA leadership on a number of occasions but was very frustrated with them. In May 1923 the army had risen to 3,000 officers and 52,000 other ranks.

== Army crisis ==
MacMahon paid an official visit to France from 14–31 July 1923 and laid a wreath on the Tomb of the Unknown Soldier. He was well received by the French military and gained much information on the running of a professional army. There was some problem with wearing an Irish military uniform but this appeared to come more from the British representatives in Paris.

The national army took steps to action the governments budgetary target of 1,300 officers and 30,000 other ranks by January 1924. MacMahon and Mulcahy found themselves in difficulty in large part due to their taking a stronger line against the IRA than would their political masters. MacMahon feared the IRA organisation would turn the army "into an armed mob" instead of being "forced into a military machine that will be the right arm of any government the people wish to place in power".

Mulcahy offered the IRA organisation an interview with MacMahon. Liam Tobin agreed to meet MacMahon provided he came as "head of the army". Mulcahy made the offer because MacMahon was President of the IRB but Liam Tobin and the IRA Organisation were not even aware of this and the significance of the offer.

As a consequence of this crisis MacMahon, along with the rest of the army council, was asked to resign. He was initially reluctant to do this and his commission was therefore withdrawn. A committee of inquiry was formed and on their recommendation he was reinstated by the Executive Council and an apology given to him in the Dáil. His commission was actually withdrawn for just one day. He returned to serve but not as chief of the general staff.

== Personal life ==
MacMahon married Lucinda Fitzgerald on Thursday 27 November 1919 in the Church of Saint Andrew, Westland Row, Dublin, that same church that he had helped save from being destroyed. They went to Ulster for their honeymoon to see Seán MacEntee, at that time vice commandant of the Belfast Brigade of the IRA. Their first home was in Heytesbury Street, in Dublin. MacMahon was the brother in-law of Commandant Theobald Wolfe Tone FitzGerald, the painter of the Irish Republic Flag that flew over the GPO during the Easter Rising in 1916. The MacMahons had three children: Terry, Kathleen and Seán.

He retired through ill health in January 1927 but declined to go into politics. The State provided him with a house, Coolgarif, in Stillorgan. He only stayed here a short time before buying a house "Meadowbrook" in Dundrum.

MacMahon died on 26 March 1955 and is buried with his wife and two of his children in Deansgrange cemetery. He received a full state funeral. A memorial committee formed and, thanks to them, his grave is marked with a Celtic cross.

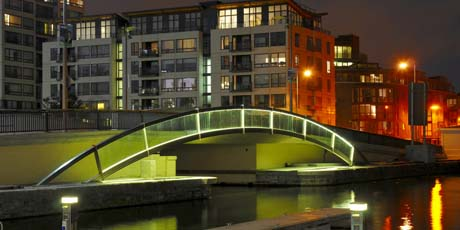
Sean Mac Mahon Bridge in Grand Canal Dock, Dublin City.

In 1966 a new bridge at Boland's Mill between Ringsend and Pearse Street was opened in his name. President de Valera unveiled the plaques. Before the ceremony members of the Dublin Brigade IRA formed up outside 144 Pearse Street, the old Battalion HQ, under the command of Vincent Byrne. This bridge was rebuilt in 2008 and rededicated in his name on 30 May 2008.

Military offices
Preceded by Richard Mulcahy	Chief of Staff of the Defence Forces; 1922–1924	Succeeded by Peadar MacMahon
