= Northumberland Road =

Street in Dublin, Ireland

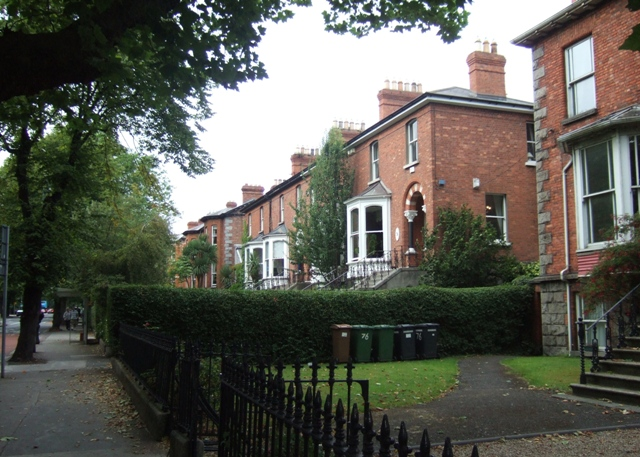
- Typical red brick Victorian houses on the road
- Interactive map of Northumberland Road
- Native name: Bóthar Northumberland (Irish)
- Namesake: Hugh Percy, 3rd Duke of Northumberland
- Length: 650 m (2,130 ft)
- Width: 19 metres (62 ft)
- Location: Ballsbridge, Dublin, Ireland
- Postal code: D04
- Coordinates: 53.335832°N 6.237878°W
- north end: Mount Street Lower
- Major junctions: Haddington Road, St. Mary's Road
- south end: Pembroke Road and Lansdowne Road

Construction
- Construction start: 1835
- Completion: 1900

Other
- Known for: Embassies; Victorian architecture

Northumberland Road (Irish: Bóthar Northumberland) is a Victorian street in Ballsbridge, Dublin, Ireland first laid out in the 1830s.

The street is lined mostly with red brick Victorian houses and London plane trees. Many of the houses have been converted to offices over the course of the 20th century.

== History ==
The street was first laid out around 1830 and was later named after Hugh Percy, 3rd Duke of Northumberland by 1843.

The property on both sides of the road was developed into residential houses from 1835 until around the turn of the 20th century by the Pembroke estate. The houses nearest Mount Street were first laid out with development extending further towards Ballsbridge over the next 60 years. Numbers 7-25 Northumberland Road (10 houses) were laid out first with a more late Georgian appearance between 1834-62 with plots 24 feet wide and 200 feet deep linking to what became the junction with Haddington Road which already formed part of a circular road around the city. The first three of these houses had been completed and were leased by 1837. All of the original Georgian and Victorian houses on the street are now protected structures.

The street formed a natural radial route that connected the city to the southern suburbs.

The street connected with Mount Street Lower via McKenny Bridge over the Grand Canal at its Northern end. Originally this bridge was named Conyngham bridge but was later renamed in honour of Thomas McKenny who was chairman of the Grand Canal Company.

At its southern end, the street is connected to Pembroke Road via a junction which also includes Lansdowne Road. Lansdowne House was originally one of a pair of 1960s office blocks which overlooked this junction until the partial demolition of the opposing Carrisbrook house block in 2024.

The street is intersected by Haddington Road which runs from Beggar's Bush to Baggot Street.

The street is not to be confused with Northumberland Square which was located on the North side of the city but has since disappeared.

=== Schoolhouse hotel ===
Among the more notable buildings on the street is the Schoolhouse Hotel. It was formerly constructed in 1861 as a Church of Ireland national school but was left largely vacant from its closure in 1969 until its refurbishment and opening as a hotel in 1997.

=== Easter Rising ===
What is considered to be one of the biggest battles of the Easter Uprising occurred at 25 Northumberland Road in what later became known as the Battle of Mount Street Bridge. According to The Irish Times, at 4:45PM on Day One, "The elderly, unarmed Veteran Defence Force march into a rebel ambush on Northumberland Road".
