= Johnny Ronan =

Irish businessman and property developer (born 1953)

- Born: John Ronan; 4 December 1953 (age 72); Clonmel, County Tipperary
- Occupations: Accountant, property developer

John Ronan is an Irish businessman and property developer known for establishing Treasury Holdings in 1989 along with Richard Barrett.

Following the Irish property crash in 2008, the National Asset Management Agency (NAMA) took over the loans of Treasury Holdings resulting in its ultimate demise. While the company itself was liquidated in 2012, many of the assets were later rolled into a residual entity named Ronan Group Real Estate (RGRE) owned by Ronan and Colony Capital while Richard Barrett went on to establish Bartra Capital Property.

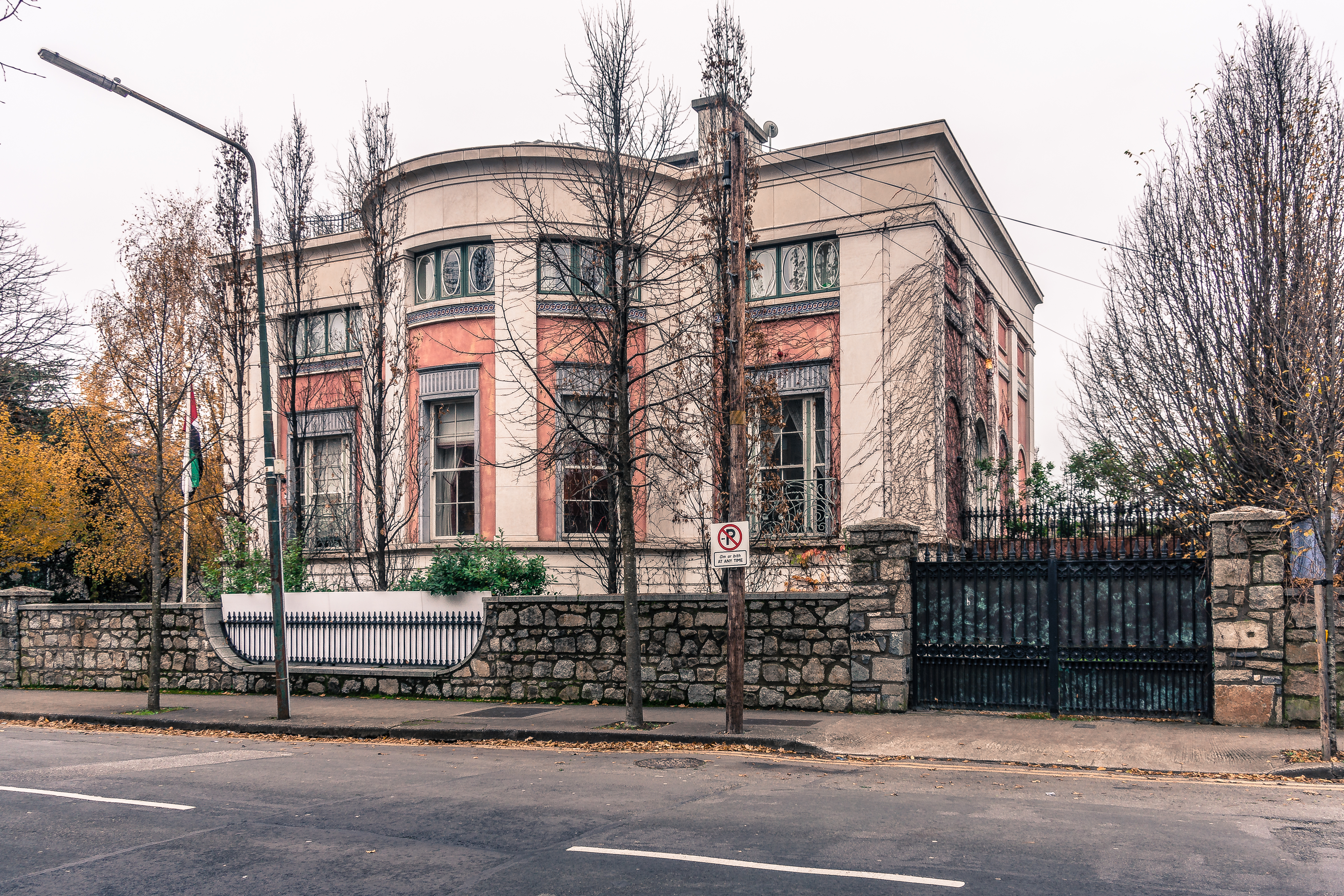
The "Pink palace", the former home of Ronan at Burlington Road, Dublin 4

== Early life ==
Ronan was born into a farming family in Clonmel, County Tipperary. He was educated at Castleknock College before going on to train as a Chartered Accountant with PricewaterhouseCoopers. He initially became involved in property deals with his property developer father before setting out on his own in the late 1970s.

== Treasury Holdings ==
Ronan teamed up with his former school friend Richard Barrett from Mayo to form Treasury Holdings in 1989. The company grew to become one of the largest Irish commercial property developers and was known for landmark buildings on Dublin's skyline. Among Treasury Holdings' high-profile developments were the Montevetro (later to become Google's European Headquarters) and Alto Vetro buildings on the Grand Canal Dock basin, the Convention Centre Dublin, the Ritz Carlton in Powerscourt, the Treasury building which housed the offices of the NTMA and the Irish headquarters of PwC at One Spencer Dock.

Real Estate Opportunities (in which Treasury Holdings had a 60% stake), was responsible for building and agreeing with the sale of the Montevetro office building on Barrow Street in Dublin to Google for €99.9m. It was Dublin's tallest commercial office building at the time of construction and was sold via a receivership process.

=== Battersea Power Station ===
In November 2006, Real Estate Opportunities purchased Battersea Power Station and the surrounding land for €532 million (£400 million). This was Treasury's biggest single scheme and in 2012 it secured the largest planning permission ever granted in central London – approximately 8.5 million square feet of residential, office and retail space masterplanned by Uruguayan architect Rafael Viñoly. The scheme also included an extension of the Northern Line Underground. On 30 November 2011, it was officially announced that the scheme's lenders Lloyds Bank and NAMA would put it into Administration. It was subsequently sold to a Malaysian consortium led by S P Setia, which had been in negotiations with Treasury Holdings prior to the Administration to buy the scheme. Setia later hired the Treasury management team to manage the construction of the scheme.

=== Decline ===
In October 2012, following the effects of both the collapse of the Irish property bubble and the Great Recession, the High Court appointed liquidators to Treasury Holdings and 16 related companies. The move followed a decision by Treasury not to resist a winding-up application by one of its banks, KBC, over a debt of €55m. Treasury had debts of €2.7bn, €1.7bn of which was owed to NAMA.

== Ronan Group Real Estate ==
Ronan retained substantial assets outside of Treasury Holdings and in April 2015 these were refinanced in a €300 million deal with backing from Colony Capital, M&G Investments, and Deutsche Bank. Ronan repaid his debts at par and exited NAMA. The refinancing for the deal was secured on RGRE's portfolio of 24 assets in Dublin - including three Grafton Street retail properties, the Treasury Building, a number of other buildings in Dublin 2, Kilmore House in Spencer Dock, and Connaught House in Burlington Road.

RGRE was soon involved in notable ventures with a combined worth of more than €1bn including restarting the planning phase of the mothballed 23-storey Aqua Vetro skyscraper adjoining Tara Street station in Dublin.

Other projects include the €150m Vertium office building on Dublin's Burlington Road and a €350m Facebook office campus in Ballsbridge on what was previously the head office of AIB. RGRE also signed off on a €600m deal to develop Spencer Place, on Dublin's North Docks which will be Dublin's biggest property development since 2008 and will be adjacent to Treasury Holding's earlier Spencer Dock development.

In 2021, RGRE submitted a planning application to build a 155-metre, 45-story building in Dublin's north docklands. This would be almost twice the height of Capital Dock, and more than twice the number of stories as Capital Dock, Dublin's current tallest building.

=== Waterfront South Central ===
In October 2018, Ronan Group Real Estate and Colony Capital formed a joint venture to acquire a 4.6-acre site in the Dublin's north docklands for in excess of €180m, being held by the National Asset Management Agency. The site had planning permission for the development of four office buildings ranging in height from six to eight storeys, comprising c. 300,000 sq. ft. of net office space, and two residential buildings of six and eleven storeys comprising 420 apartments.

Following the commencement of construction on the site in 2019, Ronan Group twice sought planning permission from Dublin City Council to increase the height on the property from nine to eleven storeys, however this was rejected. This was followed by a third planning application to increase the height of the property from nine to thirteen storeys, however this was again rejected by Dublin City Council. Despite this, the design was awarded the title of the "greenest" Salesforce Tower in the world.

In July 2020, Colony Capital appointed Eastdil Secured to dispose of its interests in Waterfront South Central and the separate, fellow Ronan Group development Fibonacci Square. In 2021, Colony Capital now rebranded as DigitalBridge, entered into an agreement to dispose of €2.7bn of non-digital assets to private equity firm Fortress Investment Group, which included the 70% interest held in the Waterfront South Central joint venture. This resulted in Ronan Group obtaining a High Court injunction against DigitalBridge in October 2021 to prevent the sale of its stakes the above-mentioned schemes to Fortress Investment Group. The injunction was then resolved in November 2021, with the interests in the joint venture being acquired by US private equity firm Blackstone in July 2022 for €500m.
