= Convention Centre Dublin =

National convention centre situated in the Dublin Docklands

- Ionad Comhdhála, Baile Átha Cliath
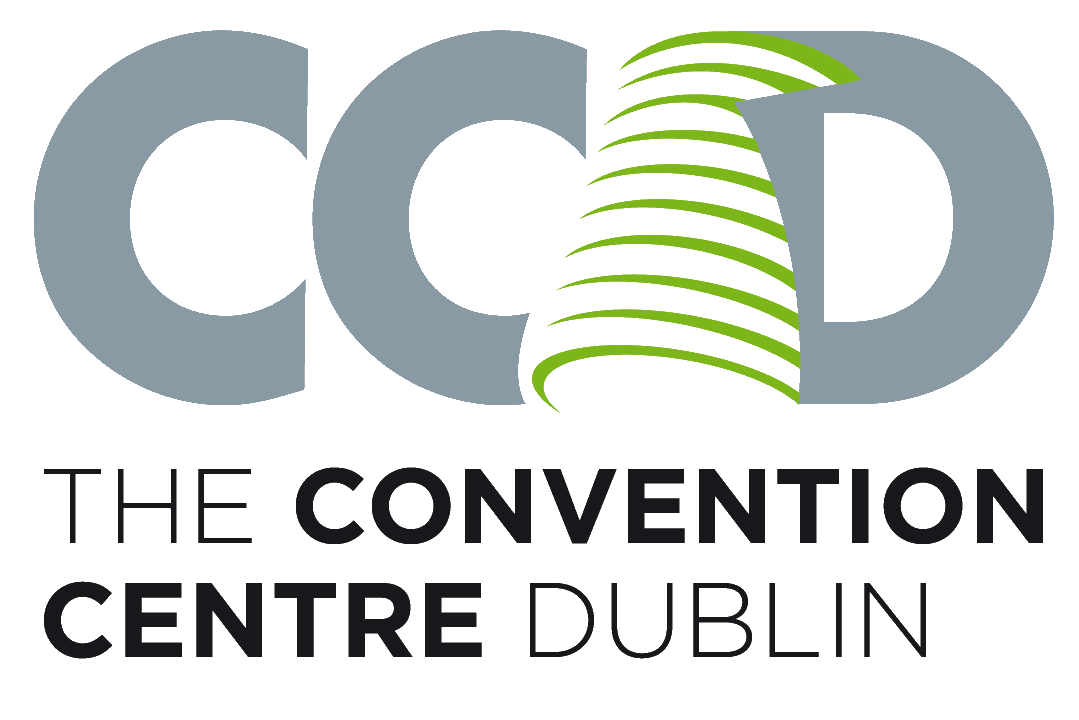

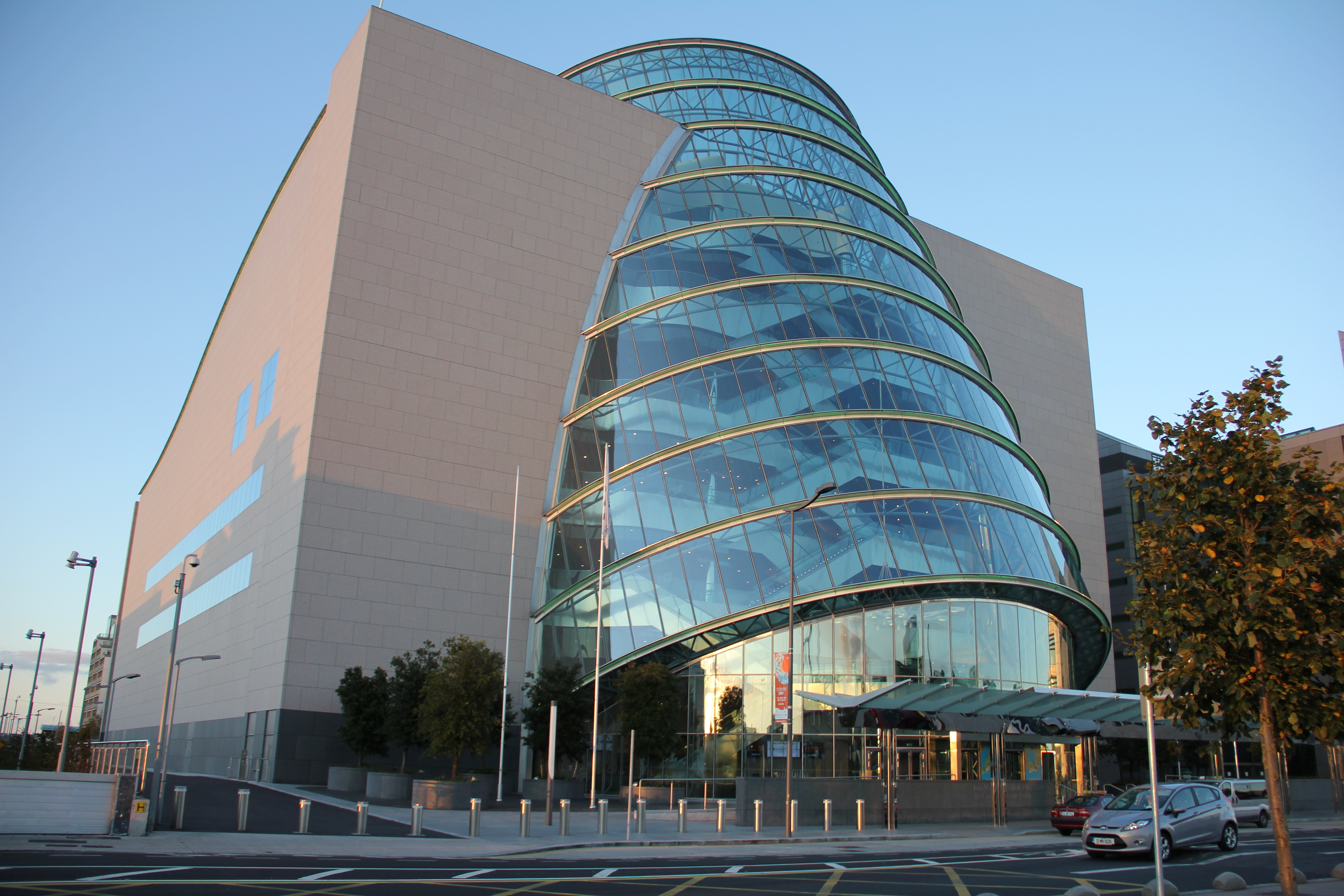
- Interactive map of the Convention Centre Dublin area

General information
- Architectural style: Modern
- Location: Spencer Dock, North Wall Quay, Dublin 1, D01 T1W6, Dublin, Ireland
- Coordinates: 53°20′53.412″N 6°14′21.561″W
- Construction started: 1998
- Completed: 5 May 2010; 16 years ago
- Opened: 7 September 2010; 15 years ago
- Cost: £104 million in 1999
- Owner: John Laing Group

Height
- Height: 55m

Technical details
- Floor area: 39,567 m^{2}

Design and construction
- Architect: Kevin Roche
- Architecture firm: Roche-Dinkeloo
- Developer: Joint Venture between Spencer Dock Development Company (Treasury Holdings) and Harry Crosbie

Other information
- Seating capacity: 1,995 (Auditorium); 3,597 (Forum); 2,151 (The Liffey)
- Parking: https://www.eurocarparks.ie/ccdparking

Website
- www.theccd.ie

The Convention Centre Dublin (Irish: Ionad Comhdhála, Baile Átha Cliath) is a convention centre in the Dublin Docklands, Ireland. The Convention centre overlooks the River Liffey at Spencer Dock. It was designed by the Irish-born American architect Kevin Roche.

Construction started in 1998 and the building opened in 2010. From June 2020 it acted as a temporary location for Dáil Éireann due to the necessity to implement social distancing because of the COVID-19 pandemic.

== History ==
In 1995, the then Irish government planned to build a National Convention Centre but this plan was abandoned. Minister for Tourism Enda Kenny had announced the location of the proposed convention centre to be at the RDS in Ballsbridge – this proved to be a dead-end. In November 1997, with the new Fianna Fáil-led government elected, a new competition to build the conference centre was launched by Tourism Minister Jim McDaid, with seven consortia entering. The Office of Public Works proposed to build the convention centre at Infirmary Road beside the Phoenix Park. The Ogden/Sonas Centre group headed by Robert White, whose plans for a casino-based scheme at the Phoenix Park had been abandoned by the previous government, also entered the competition. The Anna Livia Consortium, comprising Earlsfort Group, Bennett Construction and Kilsarin Concrete, proposed a conference centre complex within Dublin Port across the street from the O2.

Treasury Holdings, headed by Johnny Ronan and Richard Barrett, who were the ultimate winners of the competition, entered into an agreement with CIÉ to locate its project at Spencer Dock. Developer Harry Crosbie was also part of the consortium. Their plan included plans for two 250-bedroom hotels, at least one of which was never ultimately built. One hotel had been planned for the rear of the Convention Centre, the site of which has been used as a park in the interim.

The closing date for entries was 31 January 1998. The European Union agreed to provide a maximum grant of £25 million towards the project though this was conditional on the project being completed by the year 2000. The overall cost of the project at the time was projected at £35m to £45m, excluding site acquisition, according to the tender document. Successful bidders would also have to hand over £250,000 to Bord Fáilte for costs incurred by them.

The CCD was shortlisted for the Engineers Ireland Excellence Awards – Engineering Project of the Year 2010.

In 2012, the Spencer Dock Development Company was put into liquidation and Grant Thornton appointed Rubicon Capital Advisors to sell the contract to run the centre in 2015. The business was ultimately acquired by the Irish Infrastructure Fund. In June 2023, the business was again sold on by the fund along with a number of other assets owned by the fund to the John Laing Group.

Due to the COVID-19 pandemic and the necessity for social distancing, Dáil Éireann temporarily sat there from June 2020.

It currently holds Dublin's own Comic Con twice a year for two days in March and August.

== Construction ==
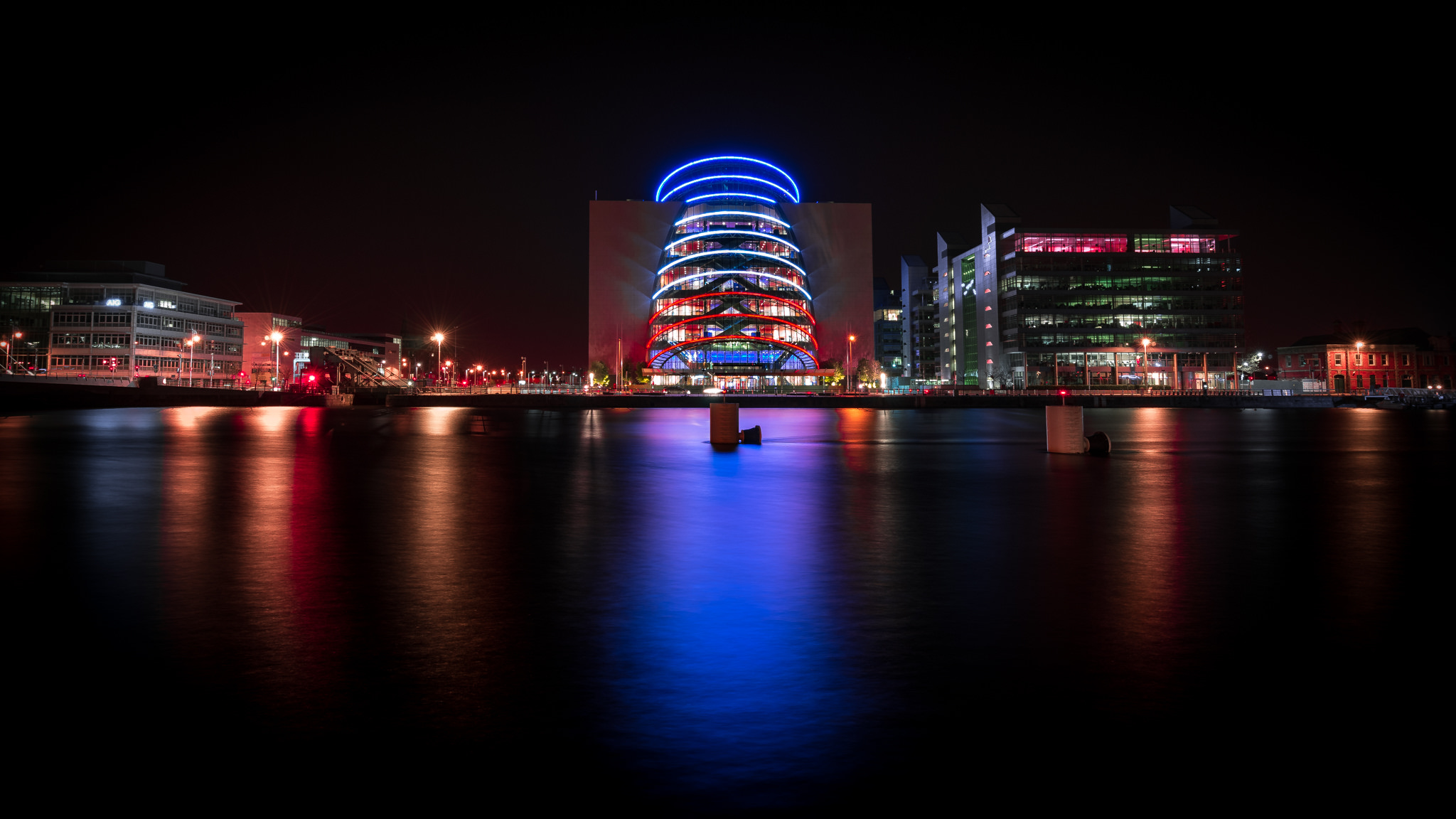
The Dublin Convention Centre, an example of modern architecture, at night

Construction work began on the project in 1998, though ultimately not finishing until 2010. A legal dispute arose between its promoters, Spencer Dock International, the Dublin Docklands Development Authority and Dublin City Council which partly delayed the project. Construction of the project was undertaken by Construction Management Partnership (CMP), a joint venture between Treasury Holdings Limited and John Sisk & Son Limited. Sisk was awarded the contract to build the "£104 million" centre in March 1999.

The building is iconic for a number of architectural innovations, particularly the glass frontage and numerous curved walls. The building can hold up to 8,000 people in 22 meeting rooms, which include a 2,000-seat auditorium and a 4,500 square metre exhibition and banqueting space.

It is the first carbon-neutral convention centre in the world because of its use of low-carbon cement and the offsetting of unavoidable carbon emissions by purchasing carbon credits in accordance with the Voluntary Carbon Standard. It also features a thermal-wheel heat-recovery system and an ice-storage thermal unit to provide air conditioning for the building.

The CCD won silver in "Best Overseas Conference Centre" in the M&IT Industry Awards 2011, second to The Grimaldi Forum in Monaco and beating Bella Center, Copenhagen and The Las Vegas Convention Center.
