= Nicholas Donnelly (bishop) =

Irish Catholic bishop

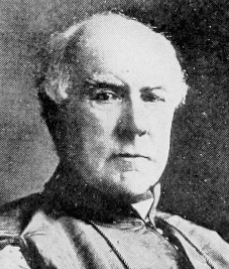
- Born: 23 November 1837; Rathgar, Ireland
- Died: 29 March 1920 (aged 82); Dublin, Ireland
- Education: Castleknock College; Irish College
- Occupation: Clergyman

Nicholas Donnelly (23 November 1837 – 29 March 1920), MRIA, was a Roman Catholic auxiliary bishop of Dublin. He was ordained a priest in 1860 and held various positions in the Dublin diocese, and in 1883 became an auxiliary bishop of Dublin and titular bishop of Canea (Crete).

== Life ==
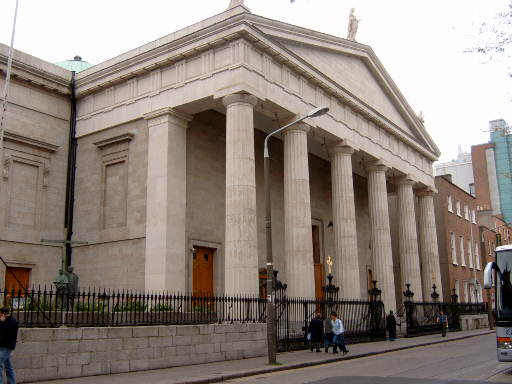
St Mary's Pro-Cathedral

Nicholas Donnelly was born 23 November 1837 in Rathgar. He was educated at Castleknock College, before going on the Irish College in Rome. He was ordained in 1860. From 1861 to 1864 Donnelly served as curate at St. Nicholas' Church; he was then stationed at St Mary's Pro-Cathedral until 1879, when he became administrator of St Andrew's Church.

From 1882 to 1894, Donnelly was pastor of Rathgar's Church of The Three Patrons (named after the three patron saints of Ireland: St Patrick, St Bridget and St Columba). It is also known as "The Servants' Church" because, in the late 19th and early 20th century, it was the place of worship for the large number of servants who worked and lived in the large houses in the area. He was made an auxiliary bishop of Dublin in 1883. In 1894, he was appointed parish priest in Bray.

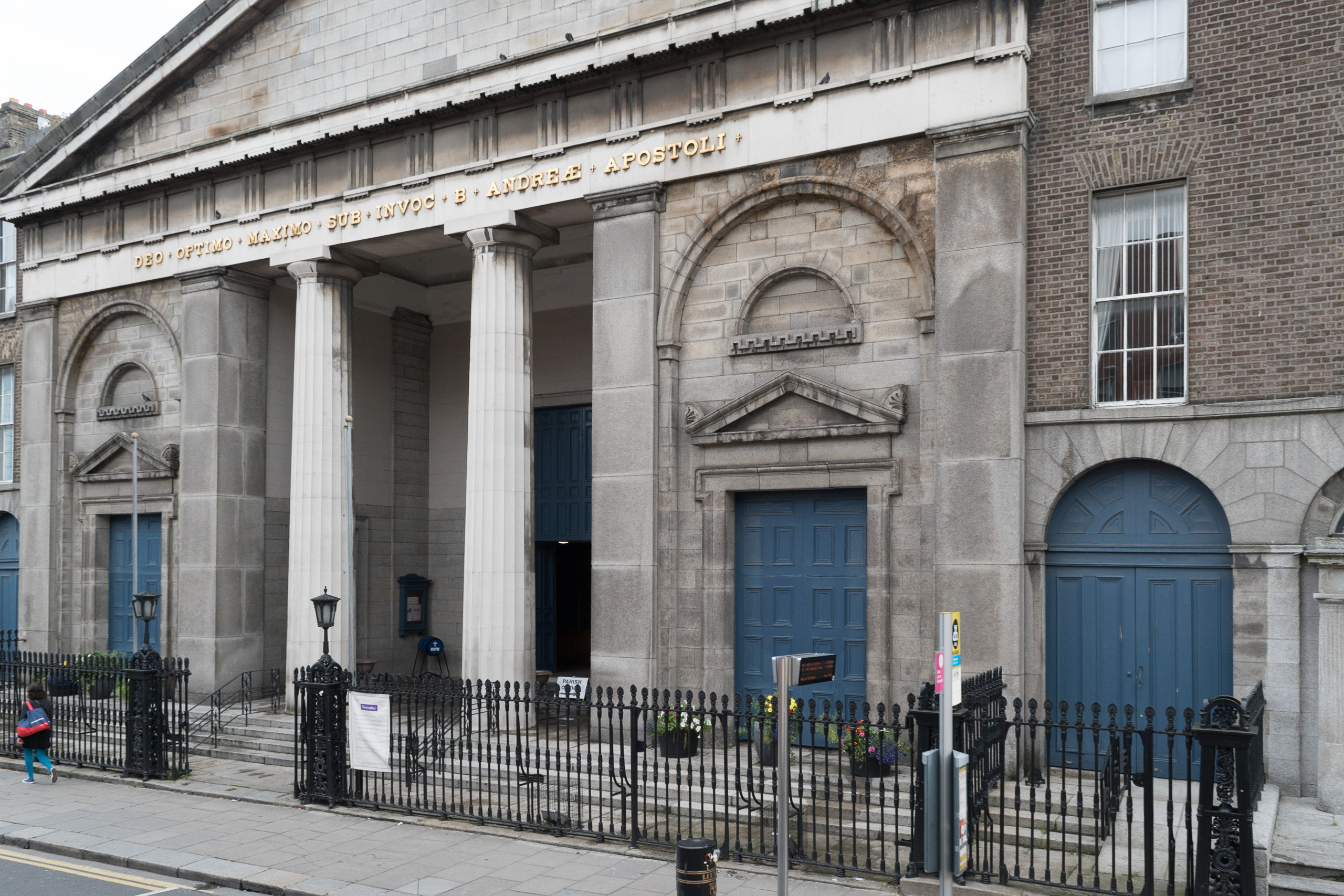
St. Andrew's Church Dublin

Donnelly was a noted linguist, preacher, historian and musician, and the author of a number of books, such as Short histories of the parishes of the Dublin diocese, as well as pamphlets and translations, such as a translation of Haberl's Magister Choralis. He contributed also to the Catholic Encyclopedia with an article on the Archdiocese of Dublin.

Donnelly had a keen interest in liturgical music and was a member of the Royal Irish Academy of Music, he was also a member of various societies such as the Royal Dublin Society, the Royal Irish Academy, the Royal Society of Antiquaries of Ireland, the Royal Societies Club (London) and the Dante Society of Ireland.

In 1882, on the death of his half sister Mary Boland (née Donnelly), he became guardian of her seven children, five girls and two boys, Patrick and John Pius Boland (who won two olympic medals in 1896 and became an MP for South Kerry). Donnelly raised them as his own, with the assistance of a cousin, Adda Dillon. He was executor of her and her husband Patrick Boland's estate, which included the Boland's Bakery business, which he floated in 1888. Boland's was the largest bakery in Dublin in the late 19th century.

During the Royal visit of Queen Victoria to Ireland in 1900, Donnelly was present at a number of the events during her stay.

He died at his home in Dublin on 29 March 1920.
