= Treasury Holdings =

Defunct Irish construction and development company

- Type: Property development
- Founded: 1989
- Founder: Richard Barrett; Johnny Ronan
- Defunct: October 9, 2012
- Headquarters: Dublin, Ireland
- Area served: Worldwide
- Key people: John Bruder (Managing Director); Rory Williams (Director); Niall O’Buachalla (Group financial director)

Treasury Holdings was an Irish property development company headed by Johnny Ronan and Richard Barrett. The company, which was insolvent with a huge amount of debt, was wound up in October 2012.

== History ==
Treasury Holdings was formed in 1989 with its first serious development being the Treasury Building on Grand Canal Street on Dublin’s southside. This building housed the National Asset Management Agency and the National Treasury Management Agency.

== Developments ==
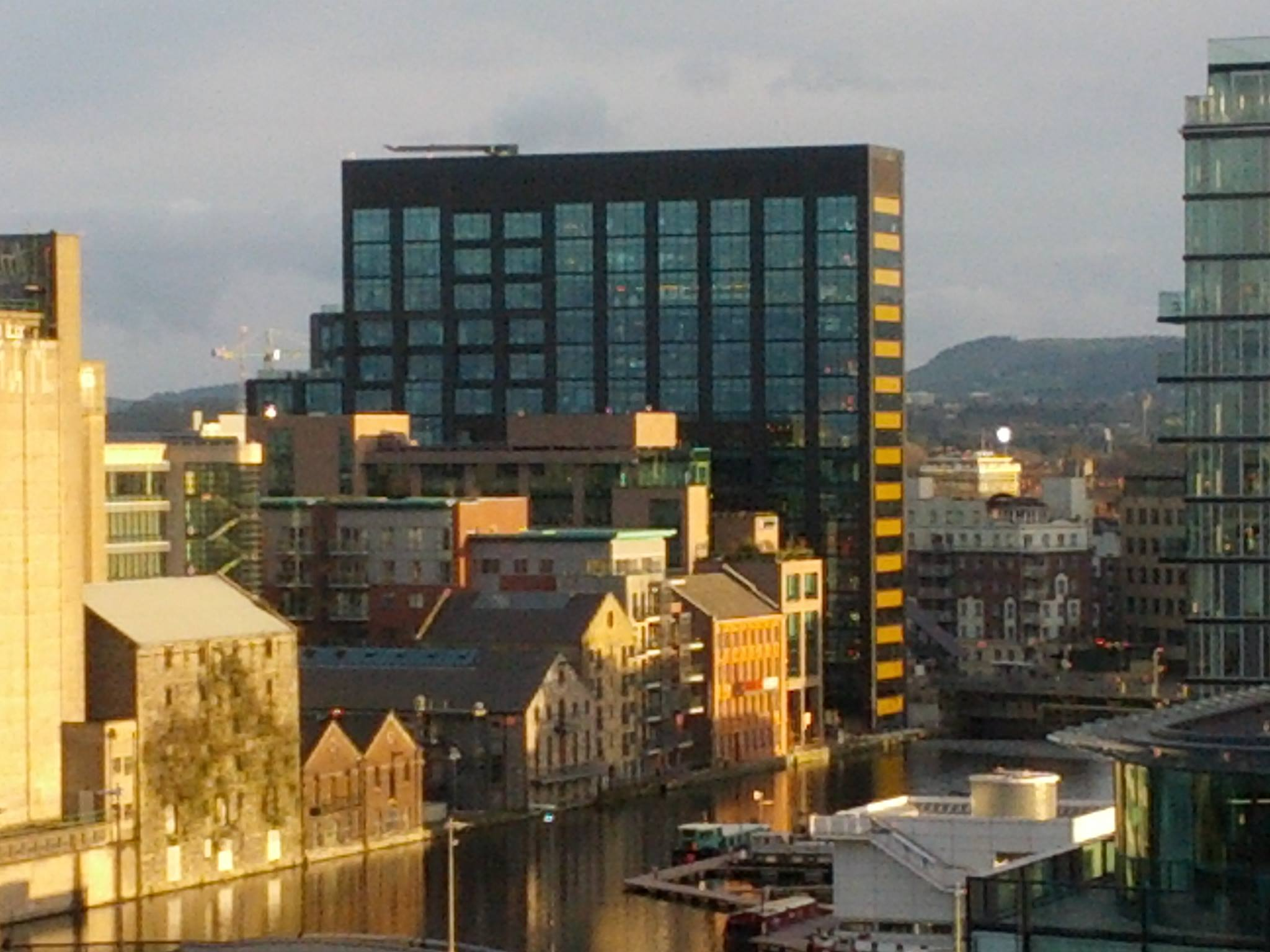
Google Docks Building, Dublin formerly named Montevetro when it was acquired by Google for €100m in 2011

- In November 2006, Real Estates Opportunities PLC (the Channel Islands-based property group in which Treasury Holdings had a 60% stake) purchased Battersea Power Station and the surrounding land for €532 million (£400 million). On 30 November 2011, it was officially announced that the REO scheme had collapsed with the debt called in by its lenders and creditors, putting the site in administration.
- It acquired part of the Stillorgan Shopping Centre where it became embroiled in a long-running planning battle.
- Blackrock Baths were acquired in 2006
- In 2007 its ambitious €60m plans to develop a state-of-the-art shopping centre and residential complex in the centre of Sligo were turned down by Sligo Borough Council.
- The Convention Centre Dublin, conceived as part of the overall Spencer Dock Development, which opened in September 2010.
- The Montevetro building and others at Grand Canal Dock. The Montevetro building was sold to Google in January 2011.

== Demise ==
In October 2012 the High Court appointed liquidators to Treasury Holdings and 16 related companies. The move followed a decision by Treasury not to resist a winding-up application by one of its banks, KBC, over a debt of €55m. Treasury had debts of €2.7bn, €1.7bn of which was owed to the National Asset Management Agency.

In January 2013 liquidators were appointed to Real Estates Opportunities PLC. REO in turn managed the Opera property fund, a collection of 16 Irish properties including the Merchants Quay shopping centre in Cork and the Stillorgan shopping centre in Dublin. Some of the loans from this fund were sold to US investor Northwood.

Richard Barrett now spends much of his time in China, and has since gone on to found Bartra, an international investment firm who 'focus on the delivery and operation of high-quality property solutions across all sectors of the market in Ireland, and internationally, including social and affordable housing, commercial real estate, residential homes, nursing homes, shared living, tourism and renewable energy.'
