= Boland's Bakery =

Defunct bakery

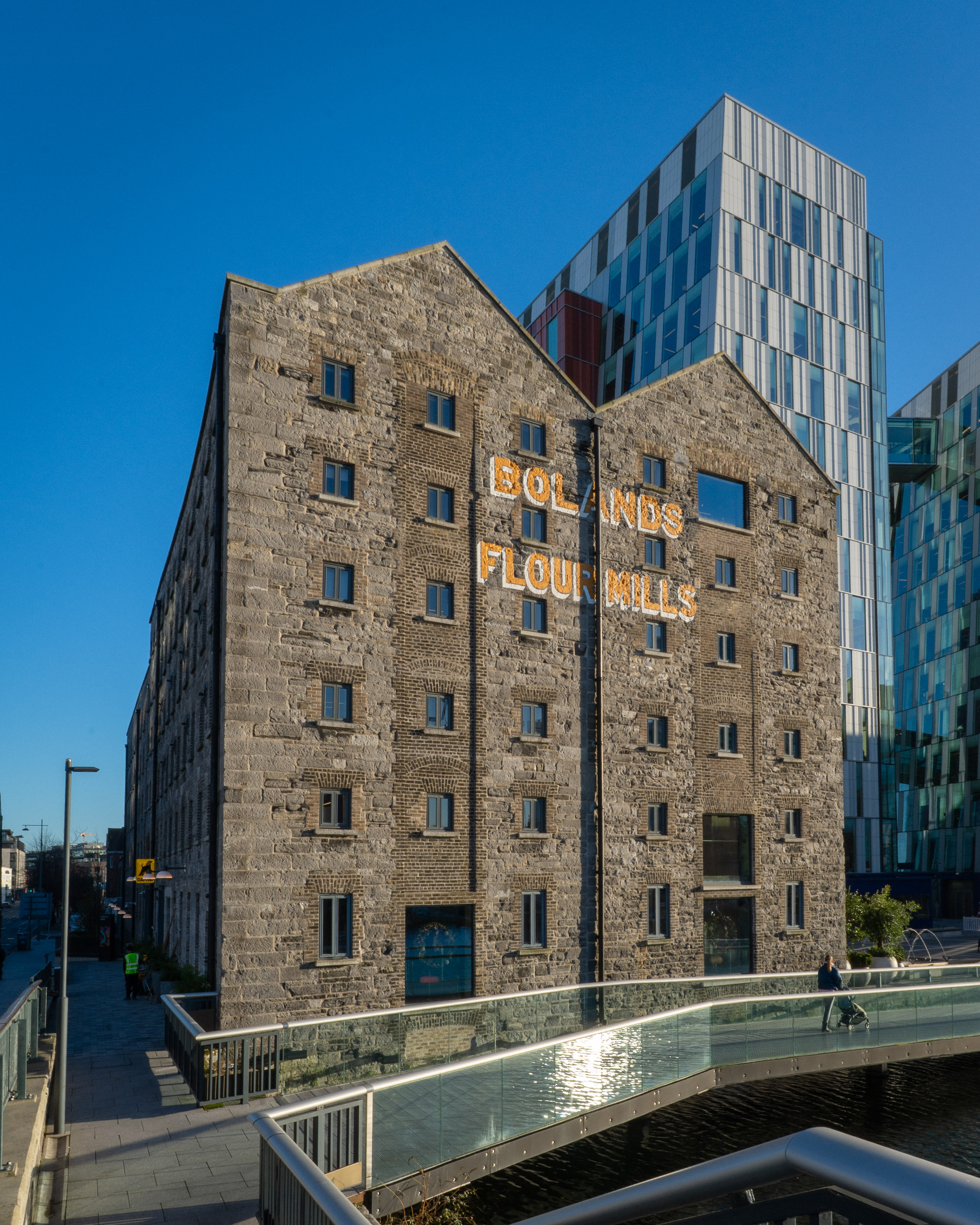
"Boland's Flour Mills" painted lettering on a warehouse in Boland's Mills.

Boland's Bakery was the largest bakery in Dublin in the late 19th century. It was founded by the Boland family. The company sold a number of products, such as bread, biscuits, cakes, confectionery and flour, although over the years biscuits became the company's main product. The original bakery was located close to Capel Street between Mary (Abbey) Street and Little Mary Street. The Boland family lived on Capel Street.

Following the death of Patrick Boland (father of future MP and Olympic champion John Pius Boland), in 1888 the company was floated by the executor of his will Bishop Nicholas Donnelly, his brother in law. A number of members of the Boland family remained shareholders in the company.

The company had a number of production facilities around the city such as the buildings around Grand Canal Dock including Boland's Mill as well as a distribution network. Vans with the company name on it were a familiar sight up until the last quarter of the twentieth century.

The main Boland's Bakery building on the corner of Grand Canal Street and Macken Street (then Great Clarence Street), now the Treasury Building, played an integral part in the 1916 Rising and was occupied by Éamon de Valera. Also during a dispute when unemployed demonstrators, led by the writer Liam O’Flaherty, occupied the Rotunda Hospital, Boland's Bakery in Capel St. donated 500 loaves to the demonstrators.

In the late 1970s Boland's merged with Jacobs Biscuits Limited, to form Irish Biscuits Limited, with much of the production moved to premises in Belgard, Tallaght. Although many products were now being produced in Britain and labelled as Irish Brands. In 2004 production at the Tallaght facility stopped. Irish Biscuits were taken over by a number of foreign companies eventually ending up being owned by the French Groupe Danone. In 2004 it was sold to the Irish Fruitfield Food Group.

The name survives today in a number of brands produced by Jacob Fruitfield Food Group, such as custard creams, cream crackers and Bourbon creams. The name 'Boland's Flour Mills' is still clearly visible on the Grand Canal Dock basin.
