= 1916 Medal =

1916 Medal An Bonn 1916
- Ribbon of the medal
- Awarded for: Service during the Easter Rising
- Presented by: Ireland
- Eligibility: Those who served in a military capacity during the week of 23 April 1916
- Established: 24 January 1941

The 1916 Medal is a service medal of the Republic of Ireland. Established 24 January 1941, the medal was awarded to those who rendered recognised military service during the week of 23 April 1916 during the Easter Rising.

== Appearance ==
The 1916 Medal is a bronze circular medal approximately 35 mm (1.4 in) in diameter. The design replicates the official Irish Army crest, a sunburst surmounted by an 8-pointed star. The obverse of the medal bears a depiction of the death of Cúchulainn, partially surrounded by a sword belt. On the reverse is the inscription: SEAĊTAIN NA CÁSCA 1916, which translates to "Easter week 1916". The medal is suspended from a ribbon of half green and half orange, the green to the wearer's right. At the top of the ribbon is a suspension bar from which the ribbon hangs bearing an interlaced Celtic design.

== See also ==
- 1916 Centenary Commemorative Medal
