= Capital Dock =

Office and apartment development in the Dublin Docklands, Ireland

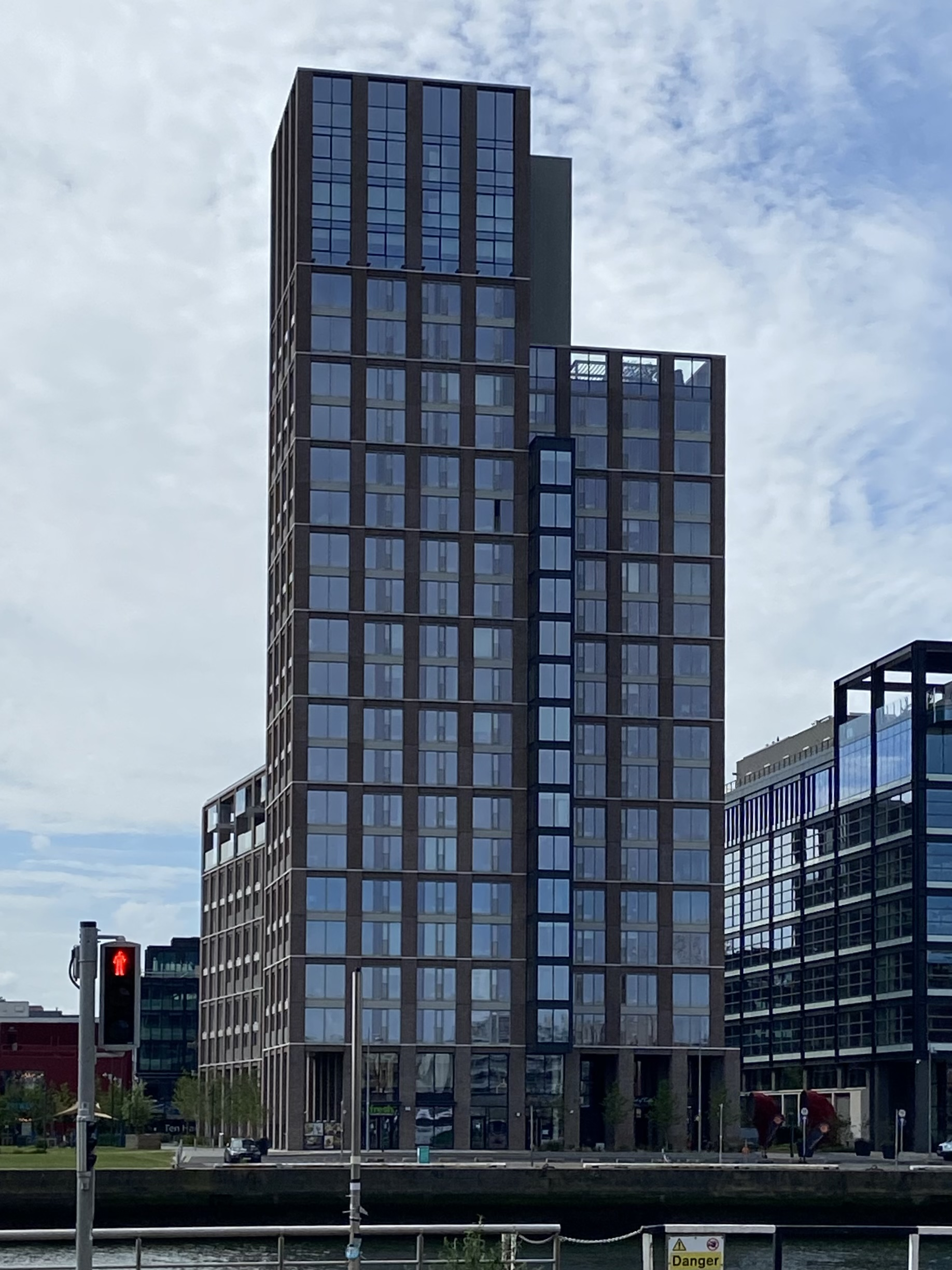
- Capital Dock, June 2021

General information
- Status: Completed
- Type: Mixed-use
- Architectural style: Modernist
- Location: 82 Sir John Rogerson's Quay, Dublin, Ireland
- Coordinates: 53.345°N 6.231°W
- Construction started: 2015
- Completed: 2018

Height
- Height: 79 m (259 ft)

Technical details
- Floor count: 22

Website
- capitaldock.ie

Capital Dock is a 22-storey mixed-use development at the junction of Sir John Rogerson's Quay and Britain Quay in the Dublin docklands. Developed by Kennedy Wilson, the site was acquired in 2012 and construction finished in 2018. Upon completion, the 79-metre tower became the tallest storeyed building in the Republic of Ireland, and the third tallest on the island of Ireland.

== History ==
The building was developed in a joint venture with the National Asset Management Agency (NAMA) on the site of the proposed U2 Tower.

In 2012, Kennedy Wilson acquired the site and development started at the end of 2014. In May 2017, they sold the 130,000 ft^{2} (12,000 m^{2}) 200 Capital Dock building to JPMorgan on a forward funding sale agreement. In December 2017, Kennedy Wilson signed a 20-year lease with Indeed, to fully occupy buildings 100 and 300 Capital Dock. The construction work, undertaken by Sisk Group, was completed in 2018.

Retail tenants include Fresh, BrewDog, Freshii and the Art of Coffee.
