= U2 Tower =

Proposed, unbuilt skyscraper in Dublin, Ireland

- Proposed U2 Tower design
- Interactive map of the U2 Tower area

General information
- Status: Never built
- Type: Apartments
- Location: Dublin, Ireland
- Coordinates: 53.34492°N 6.23240°W
- Cost: €200 million (planned)

Height
- Roof: 130 m (427 ft)

Design and construction
- Architect: Foster + Partners
- Developer: Geranger
- Structural engineer: Arup

The U2 Tower was a cancelled skyscraper which was proposed to be constructed in Dublin, Ireland. The site proposed was in the South Docklands (SODO) campshires, at the corner of Sir John Rogerson's Quay and Britain Quay, by the confluence of the River Liffey, the River Dodder, and the Grand Canal. The design announced on 12 October 2007 was by Foster + Partners. Reports suggested a building height of 120 metres, "well over 120 metres", and 180 metres, any of which would have made it the tallest building on the island of Ireland. The building was planned to be an apartment building, with a recording studio owned by the rock group U2 in a "pod" at the top. Construction was to begin in 2008 and end in 2011, at a cost of €200m. In October 2008, the project was cancelled because of the economic downturn at the time. Proposals to revive the plan were reported in July 2013. However, they did not come to fruition and the 79-metre, 22-storey Capital Dock development has since been built on the site.

== History ==
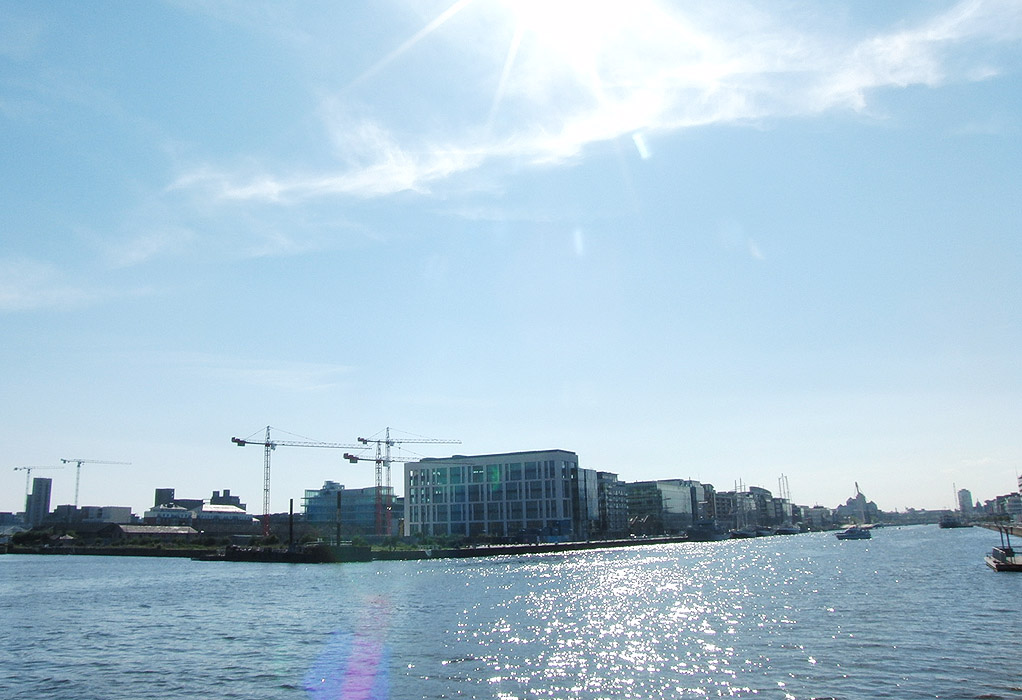
The construction site at Britain Quay in June 2009

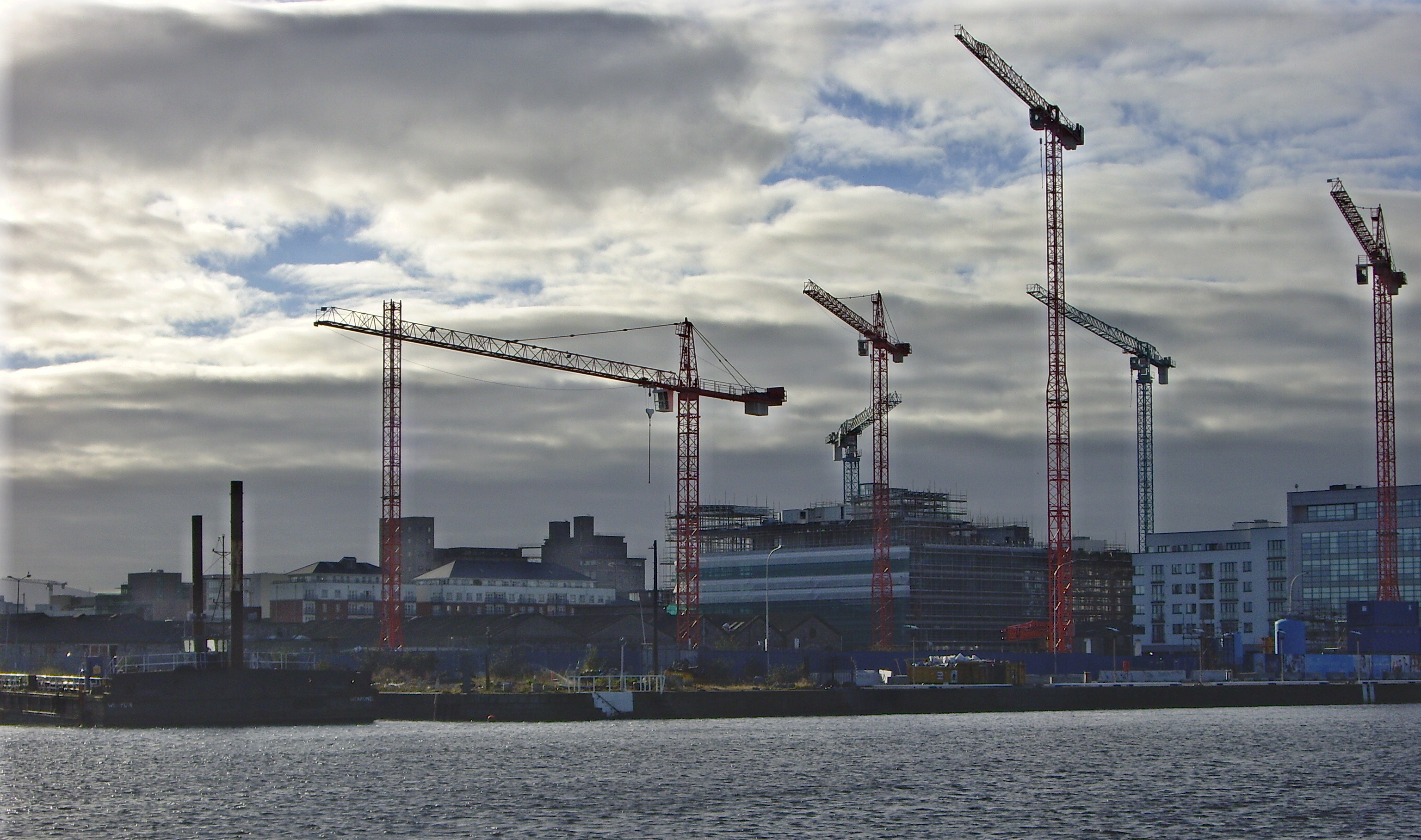
Site being cleared for construction in February 2008

The Dublin Docklands Development Authority (DDDA) was established in 1997 to regenerate the brownfield sites and underused warehouses in the Docklands at the mouth of the River Liffey in Dublin. In 2000, the DDDA proposed a landmark tower for the Britain Quay site. The involvement of U2 was part of a deal in 2001 when the DDDA had acquired by compulsory purchase the site of U2's previous studio on Hanover Quay. In October 2002, the DDDA announced an architectural design competition for the tower, initially to be 60 metres tall, which would house apartments and a penthouse recording studio for U2. 530 entries were received from around the world by the closing date in February 2003. The judging panel was not revealed till after the winner was announced. It included the president of the Royal Hibernian Academy, the chairman and two other members of the DDDA, Dublin's City Architect, and Adam Clayton of U2.

The panel initially chose as the winner an entry which was later disqualified after legal advice because the DDDA had lost the details of which firm had submitted the design and so were unable to notify the winner. The Sunday Times later speculated that it might have been one by London practice 3W, after a campaign by Irish website archiseek.com led to six unidentified designs being located. On 5 August 2003, the winning design announced was by architects Burdon Dunne/Craig Henry (now BCDH Architects) of Blackrock, Dublin. Felim Dunne, the senior partner in Burdon Dunne, was the brother-in-law of U2's manager Paul McGuinness.

The tower's stated height was 60 metres to the parapet, but 78 metres to the pinnacle of the glass screening device.

In September 2005, the DDDA revised the height of the U2 tower from 60 metres to 120 metres. This was in conjunction with the also-cancelled construction of the 120-metre Watchtower in the Point Village complex on the north bank of the Liffey, opposite the U2 tower. The DDDA envisaged the two towers forming a "landmark entry" and "visual gatepost" for the city from Dublin Port. Minister for the Environment, Heritage and Local Government Dick Roche approved the DDDA's plans in July 2006. The DDDA applied for planning permission for the U2 tower on 14 September 2006. This application further increased the height of the tower to 130m. The provisions of Section 25 of the DDDA Act, 1997 were used to fast-track the application. It was approved on 2 October 2006.

Tenders for construction of the tower were invited and a shortlist of five firms was published on 26 February 2007. The winning bid announced on 12 October 2007 was from Geranger, a consortium of property developers and the members of U2. The design selected was not the original BCDH design, but rather one commissioned by Geranger from Norman Foster. The bids were assessed by a panel of three architects. The runner-up was also a new design, by Zaha Hadid.

On 31 October 2008, the Dublin Docklands Development Authority announced that they were cancelling the construction plans due to the economic conditions at the time.

On 25 November 2011, it was announced that U2 Tower land had been handed over to the National Asset Management Agency (NAMA) to settle debts.

== Problems ==
Developers Dunloe Ewart (subsequently taken over by Liam Carroll) had secured planning permission in 2000 for a 100-metre building on a site next to that of the U2 tower. The DDDA objected to this in 2005 as it wanted the U2 tower to be an isolated landmark. Dublin City Council refused to extend planning permission on Carroll's undeveloped site after it expired. In September 2007, Carroll appealed this in the Commercial Court. Some residents of Ringsend accused the DDDA of "arrogance", claiming that extra revenue from two towers could fund social housing schemes in nearby areas. Others expressed discontent at the presence of a skyscraper in a historically low-rise area.

Concerns were expressed about a possible conflict of interest for U2 in the building tender process, when it emerged that the band were joint backers of Geranger. After the original BCDH bid's success, it was pointed out that U2 manager Paul McGuinness is the brother-in-law of BCDH architect Felim Dunne.

The impact of the 2007 subprime mortgage financial crisis brought doubts on the viability of the BCDH design. Journalists speculated that the extra engineering expense of the complicated "twisting tower" design was excessive, and that an alternative design would be used instead. Construction tenders were able to submit price quotations for both the original BCDH design and an alternative of their own choosing.

Delays at all stages of the design and planning phases were commented upon. The estimated cost and completion date later moved from €55m and early 2008 in September 2006 to €200m and late 2011 in October 2007.

== Design ==
The predicted price of a 2-bed apartment in the tower was estimated in October 2006 at €1–1.5 million.

=== BCDH design ===
The BCDH design had a 45-degree twist, half the 90-degree twist of the Turning Torso in Malmö. It had a shoulder height of 100m, to the top floor of apartments, and a pinnacle height of 130m, including a service level and the two-storey penthouse recording studio. There were a total of 36 storeys. The footprint was a 26.6m square. The building was primarily to consist of one-, two-, and three-bedroom apartments, with commercial premises on the ground and first floors, a two-level basement parking garage, and the penthouse.

The dramatic twisting geometry of the tower posed a significant structural engineering challenge, resolved using a column structure of inclined columns following the twist of the building and the stiff circular core for torsional stability. 26.6 m^{2} floor plates twist by an equal amount per storey about the circular core, housing lifts and services risers as well as a double-deck lift for service/firefighting and penthouse access.

=== Foster design ===
The design chosen on 12 October 2007 was a tilted triangle. It had mainly luxury apartments, with a public viewing platform at 100m, just below an acoustically insulated egg-shaped pod containing the U2 recording studio. Above this was to be an "energy centre" containing wind turbines and a large solar panel. The east and west facades were crinkled in the manner of fish scales, with concealed balconies. The north facade would have been sleek, while the south facade had further solar panels. The building would have straddled the end of Sir John Rogerson's quay, allowing traffic to pass through its base.

==== Environs ====
A five star hotel was planned to be located adjacent to the tower, with a block of 34 social and affordable apartments. A bridge for pedestrians and public transport would have crossed the Dodder/Grand Canal mouth outside the tower, as a continuation of Sir John Rogerson's Quay towards the East Link Bridge. This was designed by UK consultants Flint & Neill.

=== Kennedy-Wilson proposal ===
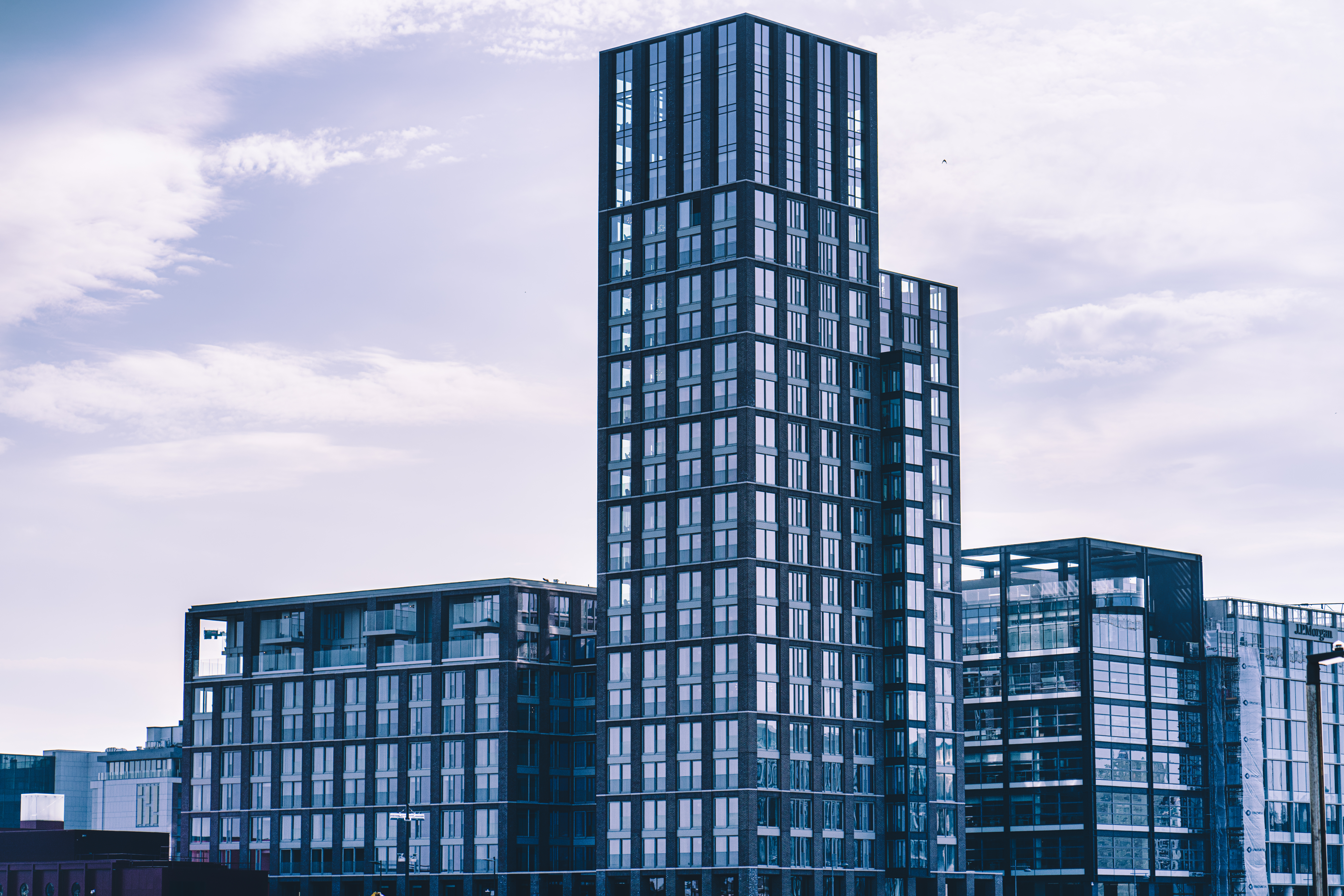
Capital Dock now stands at the U2 Tower's site

It was reported in July 2013 that Kennedy-Wilson, an American firm, was planning to buy the site off NAMA and develop an 18-story U2 Tower, half the height of the earlier plan. This plan was later cancelled, being replaced by the 79-metre, 22-storey Capital Dock development which currently stands on the site.
