= St. John's-Ravenscourt School =

Location
- 400 South Drive; Winnipeg, Manitoba; Canada; 49.8433°N 97.1221°W

Information
- Established: 1820
- Head of school: Dr. Mike Healy
- Grades: K-12
- Enrolment: 850-1000 students
- Language: English
- Colours: Green and Gold
- Mascot: Golden Eagle
- Team name: Eagles
- Website: www.sjr.mb.ca

St. John's-Ravenscourt School (commonly referred to as SJR) is an independent, co-educational, university-preparatory school founded in 1820. Located in Winnipeg, Manitoba, the school delivers an enriched curriculum from Kindergarten through Grade 12. The school offers a boarding option starting in grade 9.

== History ==
The organization that became St. John's College School was founded in 1820 by Rev. John West as the Red River Mission School for the children of early Selkirk settlers and select Indigenous children. The school was originally built in Selkirk on the banks of the Red River, and then relocated by Rev. David Thomas Jones to Winnipeg, on the west bank of the river near present-day St. John's Park. In 1834, there were 20 boys and 21 girls attending the renamed Red River Academy.

The Academy was purchased in 1849 by the Bishop of Rupertsland, David Anderson, and was renamed St. John's Collegiate. In 1866, the school's name was changed to St. John's College School. Its campus was expanded to include buildings on Main Street and Anderson Avenue, which stood as a landmark until their demolition in the early 1950s.

In 1929, Norman Young became the first headmaster of Ravenscourt. Young had been encouraged by a group of Winnipeg businessmen, who promised that their sons would attend. Ravenscourt school was originally located at Armstrong's Point on the Assiniboine River. In 1934, it was relocated to a house built by Colonel R.M. Thomson. The unfinished home was located in Fort Garry on the banks of the Red River. The new facility was soon expanded to include the Richardson Gymnasium, the first gym in Western Canada to sport a basketball court.

In 1950, the Board of Anglican churchmen that as a group governed St. John's College decided to close the school. This decision upset the alumni of the school, and the alumni sought a way to continue their school. It was finally decided that St. John's College School would be amalgamated with Ravenscourt. The two schools became St. John's-Ravenscourt.

After the flood of 1950, many new facilities were added to the school, notably an arena and a junior school building. In 1971, the school made the decision to readmit girls to the school.

In November 1981, Her Majesty the Queen granted her patronage to the School, and one year later gave permission for the creation of scholarship in her name to mark the event of her patronage.

In 2004, kindergarten classes and a music room were created for the junior school, and girls were allowed into junior school. In 2014, the new Richardson Senior School and Riley Fitness Centre were opened. The renovation project was done by Bockstael Construction in association with Stantec Architects.

== Curriculum ==
On the national stage, SJR is the host of the annual Canadian National Public Speaking Championship; internationally, SJR has won 15 of the 32 World Individual Debating and Public Speaking Championships (WIDPSCs) thus far - more than any other school - with their most recent first place overall finish at WIDPSC 2014.

== Tuition ==
There is an application fee of $3,000 for new Canadian students and $11,000 for new international students. Day school tuition is $24,960 for kindergarten to grade 5 students and $25,590 for grade 6 to grade 12 students. Boarding school tuition is $26,262 for Manitoba residents, $57,200 for other Canadian residents, and $72,500 for international students. The school has financial aid for those who are unable to pay the full tuition.

== Notable alumni ==
St. John's-Ravenscourt School has produced 18 Rhodes Scholars, as well as numerous otherwise notable alumni, including:

- Donovan Alexander: CFL Football player
- Tyler Arnason: former National Hockey League player.
- David Asper: lawyer (represented David Milgaard); businessman; Chairman of the National Post newspaper; Executive Vice President of CanWest Global Communications Corp.
- Jennifer Botterill: Olympic gold medallist; former member of the Canadian national women's hockey team.
- Steve Braun: television and movie actor.
- Martha Burns: actress - best known for playing the lead role of Ellen Fanshaw in the award-winning Slings and Arrows.
- Charles Camsell: Canadian explorer, author, founder of the Royal Canadian Geographical Society, Deputy Minister of Mines and Natural Resources, Commissioner of the Northwest Territories.
- Matthew Corrin: founder of Freshii
- Susan Coyne: writer and actor; best known as one of the co-creators and co-stars of the award-winning Slings and Arrows.
- Brian Engblom: former National Hockey League player.
- Brett Hull: former National Hockey League player; son of Bobby Hull.
- Gerard Kennedy: politician; former Ontario Minister of Education under Dalton McGuinty; former candidate for leadership of the federal Liberal party.
- David Kilgour: politician; one of the longest current serving Members of Parliament and one of the very few who has been elected under both the Progressive Conservative and Liberal banners; awarded the 2009 Human Rights Prize of the International Society for Human Rights in Switzerland for work in raising awareness of state-sponsored organ pillaging in China.
- Ralph Krueger: former Edmonton Oilers head coach; currently the Chair of Southampton F.C. of the Premier League.
- Ryan Reaves: NHL player
- James Armstrong Richardson: politician; member of Cabinet under Pierre Elliott Trudeau; businessman; founder of James Richardson International.
- David Schumacher: Emmy-winning television and film producer/director.
- Alexander Steen: National Hockey League player.
- Sarah Stock: wrestler (a.k.a. Sarita, Dark Angel)
- Zach Werner: musician; record producer; entertainment lawyer; and talent manager.

== Athletics ==
Athletics are an important factor in the SJR community. Soccer is the School's most popular sport in terms of participation, with twelve recreational teams from U9 through U16, four Varsity teams and two CAIS traveling teams. Ultimate Frisbee is another popular sport at SJR, with traveling teams, and recreational teams. Ice hockey, another popular sport at SJR, is played in Dutton Memorial Arena.

Other popular sports include rugby, volleyball, basketball, and badminton.
