= Pig & Calf Lunch =

- U.S. National Register of Historic Places
- NM State Register of Cultural Properties
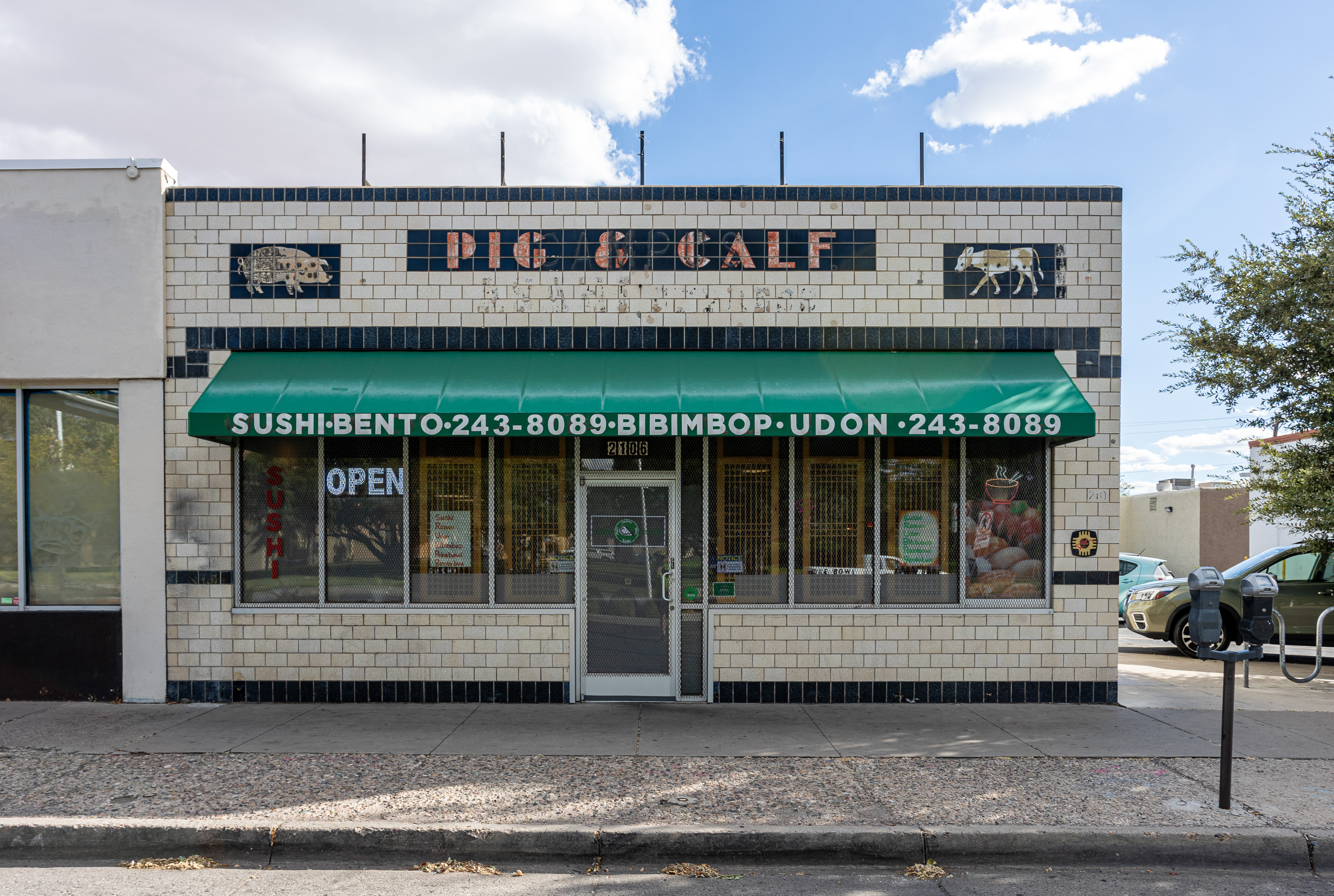
- Serving Korean and Japanese Cuisine in 2024

- Location within New Mexico Location within the United States
- Location: 2106 Central Ave. SE; Albuquerque, New Mexico
- Coordinates: 35°04′51″N 106°37′21″W
- Built: 1935
- NRHP reference No.: 93001222
- NMSRCP No.: 1566

Significant dates
- Added to NRHP: February 15, 1994
- Designated NMSRCP: September 17, 1993

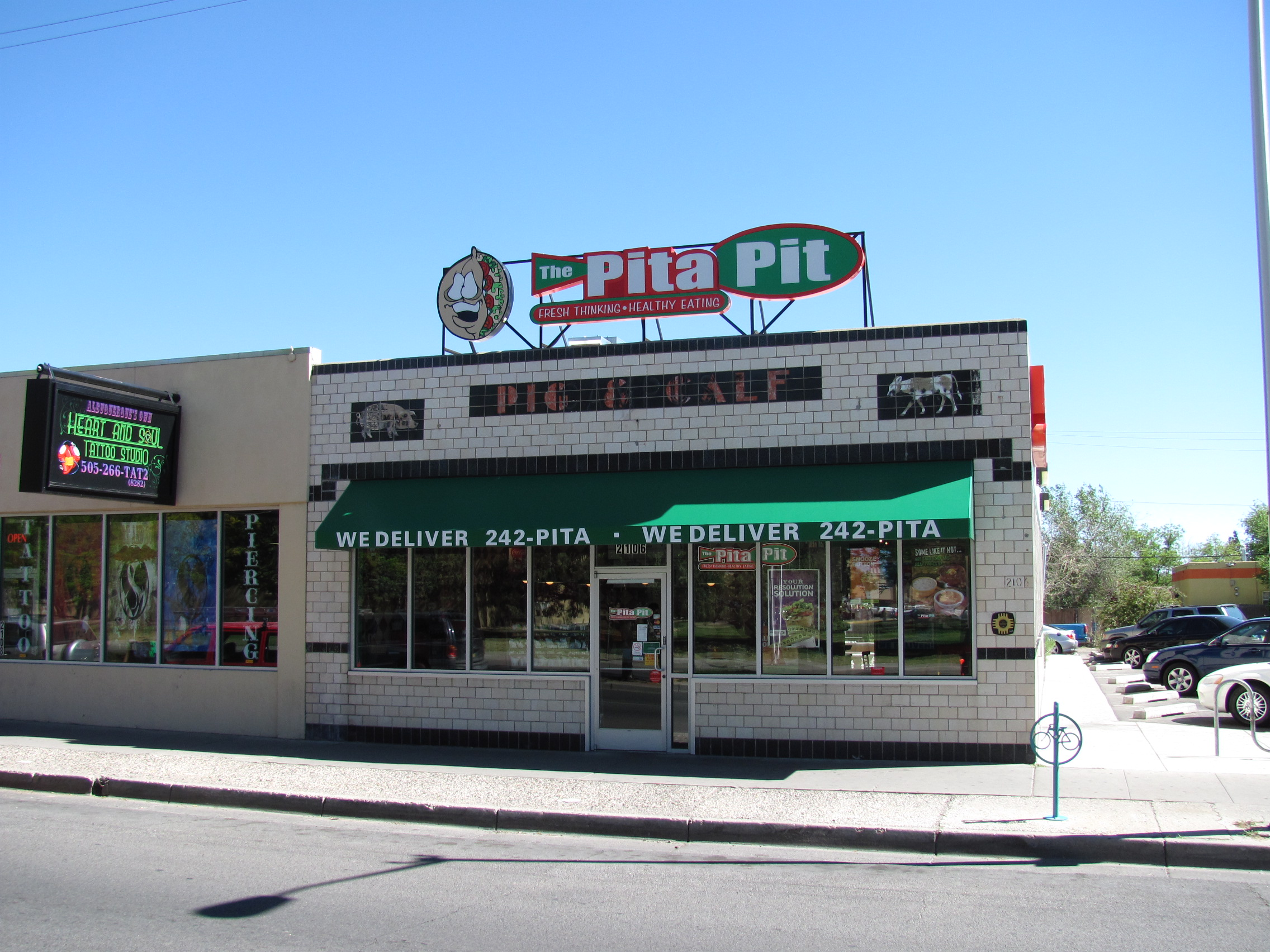
"Pita Pit" in May 2010

The Pig & Calf Lunch, also known as the Pig Stand Cafe, is a historic building in Albuquerque, New Mexico. It is notable as a largely original example of mid-1930s commercial architecture. The building was added to the New Mexico State Register of Cultural Properties in 1993 and the National Register of Historic Places in 1994.

== History ==
The Pig & Calf Lunch was built by local restaurateur Charlie Ellis, replacing an earlier iteration of the same business dating to 1924. The new cafe opened on May 14, 1935 and remained in operation until the 1950s, profiting from the influx of travelers brought by the realignment of U.S. Route 66 along Central Avenue in 1937. Although the name Pig & Calf appears on the building, it mostly operated as the Pig Stand Cafe. In later years the building housed the University Cafe and then a laundromat before being restored and reopening as a Pita Pit franchise in 2005.

== Architecture ==
The Pig & Calf Lunch is a one-story, flat-roofed building featuring elements of Streamline Moderne architecture. It is constructed of hollow clay tile faced inside and out with white ceramic tile, with contrasting horizontal bands of black tile along the base and roof line on the exterior of the building as well as above and below the windows. The front of the building is decorated with tile friezes depicting the titular animals on either side of the "Pig & Calf" name. The building has a continuous bank of windows under a full-width transom on the north (street) facade and ten separate windows on the west facade, which faces an off-street parking lot.
