= Percy (company) =

Defunct Canadian technology company

- Type: Private
- Industry: Call center
- Founded: 2021
- Founders: Matthew Corrin; Angela Argo; Ali Aqueel
- Defunct: 2023
- Headquarters: Toronto, Canada
- Areas served: Canada; United States
- Website: hipercy.com

Percy was a Canadian technology company that specialized in providing virtual cashier services. The company's system utilized videotelephony technology to employ remote workers, often from developing countries. It was based in Toronto, Canada.

== History ==
Percy was founded in 2021 by Matthew Corrin, Angela Argo, and Ali Aqueel. The concept of Percy originated as a response to staffing shortages experienced by Freshii, a fast-food chain. It was named after the character of the "reliable and eager-to-please" tank engine from the children's television series Thomas and Friends. In an effort to mitigate these challenges, Matthew Corrin, then-CEO of Freshii, initiated a pilot project in November 2021. The project involved the deployment of Percy devices: video-calling units attached to cash registers at selected Freshii locations. These devices would activate when customers approached, connecting them to cashiers who were physically located in distant locations, such as a call center in Bolivia, Nicaragua, and Pakistan.

The remote cashiers, equipped with headsets, managed customer orders from their offshore locations. This system allowed for operational cost savings, as the wages paid to these virtual cashiers were significantly lower than the minimum wage in Ontario. Despite being part of the customer service process, these remote employees were distinctly separated from the on-site staff who performed tasks such as food preparation and maintenance.

In February 2022, after its initial testing and development phase, Percy was officially launched.

In January 2023, Crazy Pita, a local restaurant in Las Vegas, started using Percy.

In August 2023, Freshii announced its decision to discontinue the use of its virtual cashier system, Percy.

== Controversy ==
Freshii, a user of Percy virtual cashier system, faced controversy for replacing some Ontario-based in-store cashiers with Nicaraguan workers operating remotely, at a wage of $3.75 per hour. Labor organizations, including the Canadian Labour Congress, condemned the move, highlighting the negative impact on local employment and international labour laws.
