= Rachel Joynt =

Irish sculptor (born 1966)

- Born: 1966 (age 59–60); Caherciveen, County Kerry, Ireland
- Education: National College of Art and Design
- Occupation: Sculptor
- Father: Dick Joynt

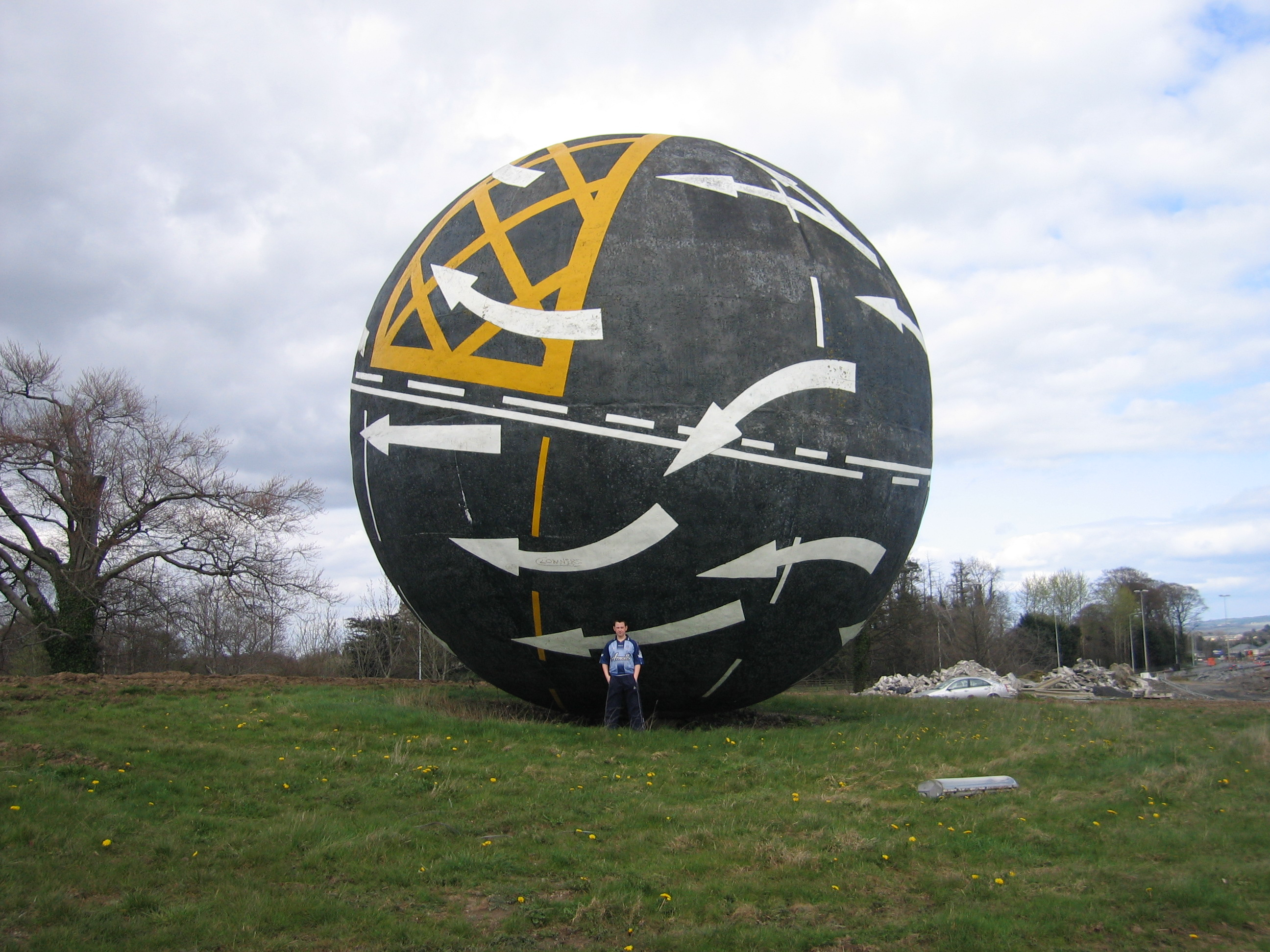
Perpetual motion

Rachel Joynt (born 1966 in Caherciveen, County Kerry) is an Irish sculptor who creates public art. She graduated from the National College of Art and Design in Dublin in 1989 with a degree in sculpture.

Her father, Dick Joynt, was also a sculptor. Rachel Joynt is preoccupied by ideas of place, history and nature, and her work often examines the past as a substrate of the present. Her commissions include People's Island (1988) in which brass footprints and bird feet crisscross a well-traversed pedestrian island near O'Connell Bridge in Dublin. She collaborated with Remco de Fouw to make Perpetual Motion (1995), a large sphere with road markings which stands on the Naas dual carriageway. This has been described by Public Art Ireland as 'probably Ireland's best-known sculpture' and was featured, as a visual shorthand for leaving Dublin, in The Apology, a Guinness beer advertisement. Joynt also made the 900 underlit glass cobblestones which were installed in early 2005 along the edge of River Liffey in Dublin; many of these cobblestones contain bronze or silverfish.

== Works in collections and on display ==
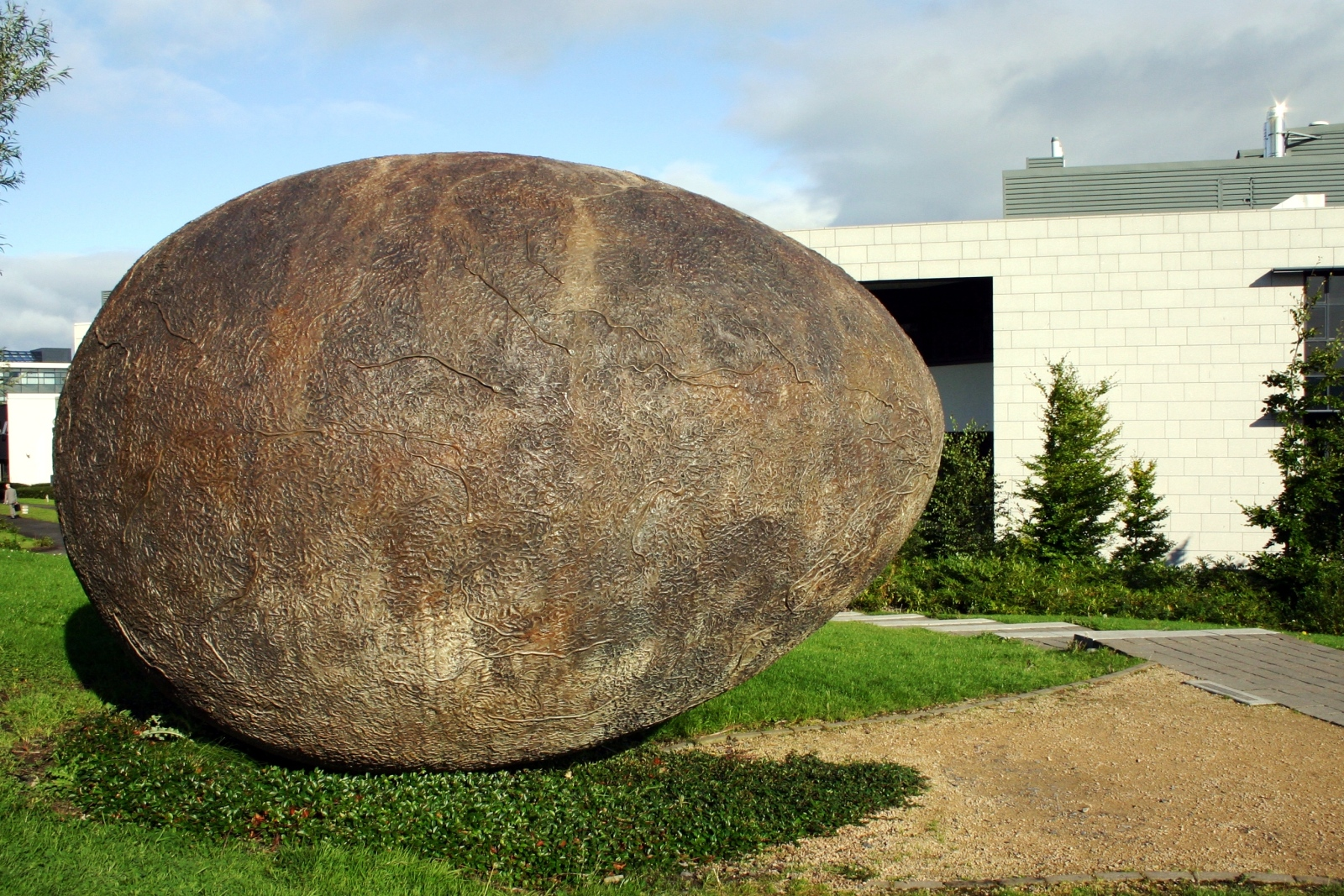
Noah's Egg, outside the Veterinary Sciences Centre in University College Dublin

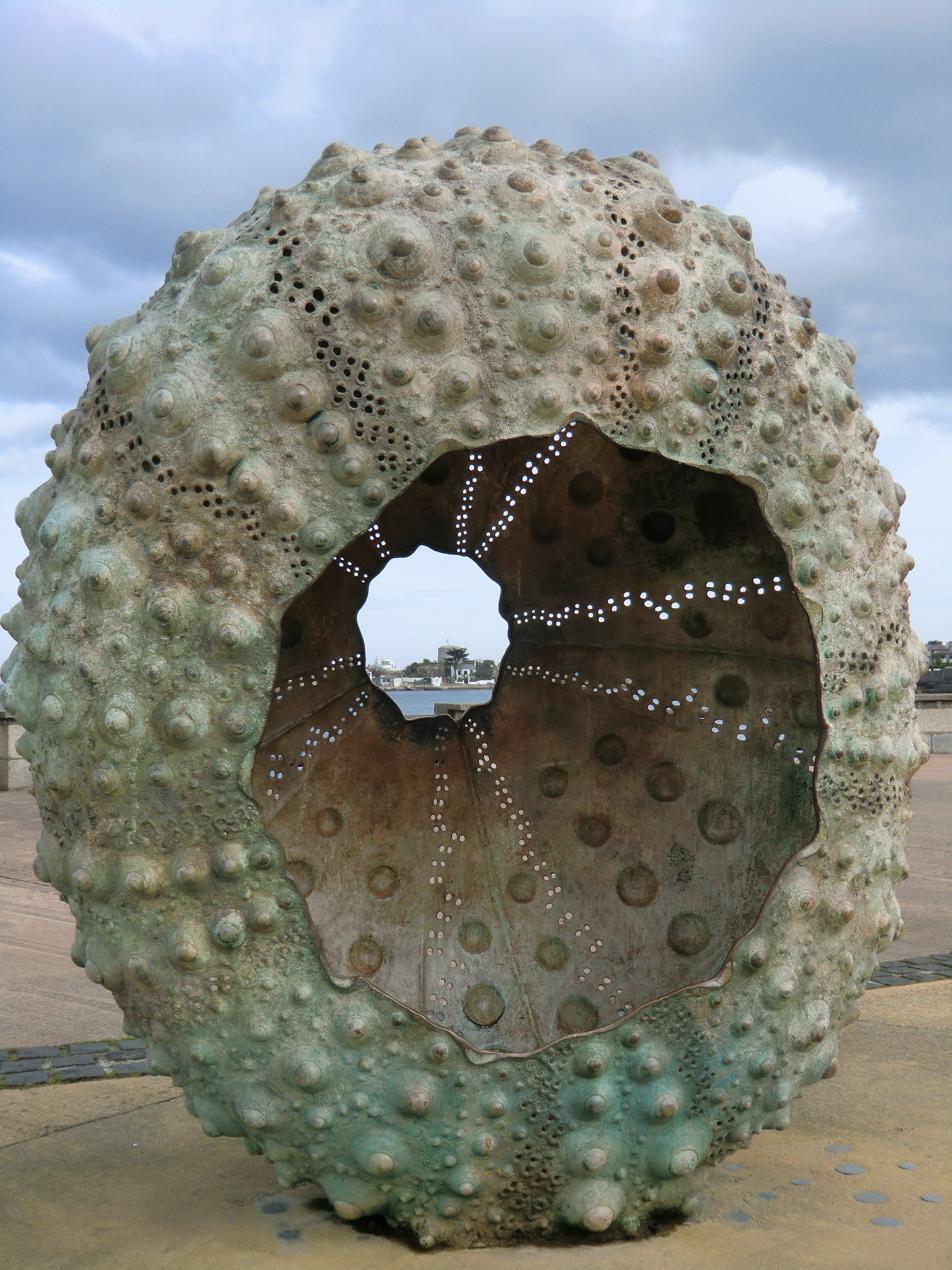
Mothership Sculpture at the coastline in Glasthule, Dublin

- People's Island (1988) on the pedestrian island south of O'Connell Bridge, Dublin
- A pavement piece depicting Viking crafts, outside Christ Church Cathedral, Dublin.
- Solas na Glasrai (The grocers' light) corner of Moore Street and Parnell Street, Dublin.

A brass light standard hung with casts of fish, fruit and vegetables

- Perpetual Motion (1995) (with Remco deFouw) Naas bypass, County Kildare.

RTE radio show about Perpetual Motion

- A marble seat with an inset bronze book at the Clare library headquarters in Ennis.

Clare Library historical webpage

- Noah's Egg (2004) University College Dublin Veterinary School, Belfield, Dublin

Press release describing Noah's Egg

- A series of underlit glass cobblestones along the Liffey campshires (2005).

Press release describing the Rachel Joynt cobblestones

- Love All (2007) in Templeogue village, Dublin
- Mothership Sculpture at the coastline in Glasthule, Dublin
- Shutter outside the Irish Film Institute, Dublin
