= Cashier =

Person who exchanges money for goods at a store

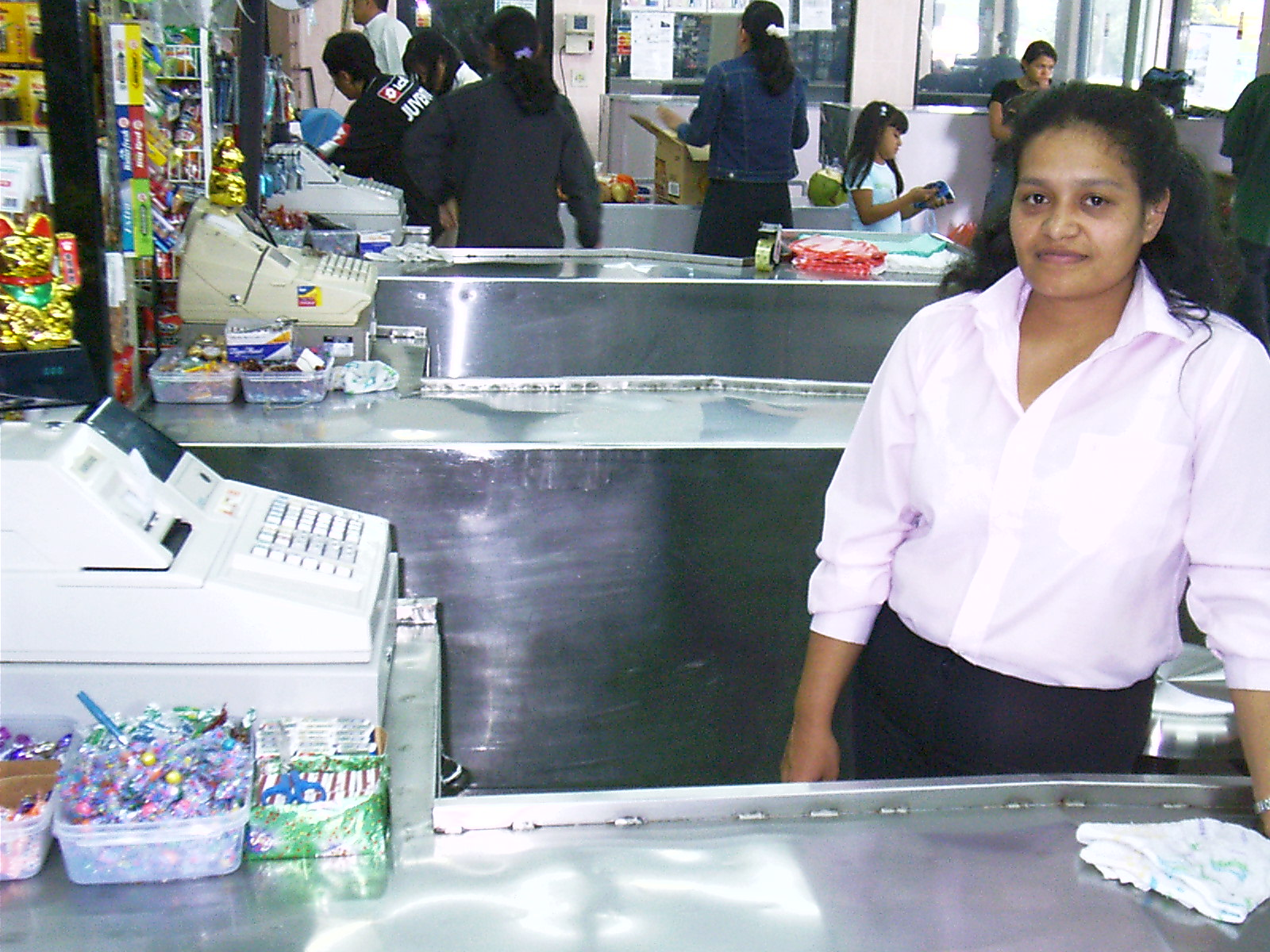
A cashier at her register in a Panamanian grocery store.

A retail cashier or simply a cashier is a person who handles the cash register at various locations such as the point of sale in a retail store. The most common use of the title is in the retail industry, but this job title is also used in the context of accountancy for the person responsible for receiving and disbursing money or within branch banking in the United Kingdom for the job known in the United States as a bank teller.

== Retail ==
Cashier counters in Beijing, China.

In a shop, a cashier (or checkout operator) is an employee who scans the goods that the customer wishes to purchase through a cash register. In most modern stores, the items are scanned by a barcode positioned on the item with the use of a laser scanner. After all of the items have been scanned, the cashier then collects the payment (in cash, check, and/or by credit/debit card) for the goods or services exchanged, records the amount received, makes change, and issues receipts or tickets to customers. Cashiers record amounts received, may prepare reports of transactions, and verify cash register totals against cash on hand. A cashier may be required to know value and features of items for which money is received; may cash checks; may give cash refunds or issue credit memorandums to customers for returned merchandise; and may operate ticket-dispensing machines and the like.

In one form or another, cashiers have been around for thousands of years. In many businesses, such as grocery stores, working as a cashier is often an entry-level position. Many employers require employees to be cashiers in order to move up to customer service or other positions.

Cashiers may be at risk of repetitive strain injuries due to the repeated movements required by the job, such as entering information on a keypad, moving product over a scanner, and standing on one's feet for several hours.

=== Demographics ===
In the United States, the majority of cashiers are women. According to Data USA, as of 2023, an estimated 71% of cashiers are female.

=== Job outlook ===
In the United States, the employed number of cashiers is expected to decline. From 2023 to 2033, the Bureau of Labor Statistics expects an 11% job outlook decline.

=== Salary ===
In 2022, the median salary in the United States for a cashier was $28,240.

== Alternative types of cashiers ==
=== Accountancy ===
A less-current meaning of the term referred responsible for receiving and disbursing money in a business. In a non-retail business, this would be a position of significant responsibility. With an ever-larger proportion of transactions being done using cash substitutes (such as checks, credit cards, and debit cards), the amount of cash handled by such employees has declined, and this usage of the word "cashier" has been largely supplanted by the title comptroller.

=== Retail banking ===
In a bank branch in the United Kingdom, a cashier is someone who enables customers to interact with their accounts, such as by accepting and disbursing money and accepting checks. In the United States, the job title is bank teller.

=== Virtual cashier ===
Virtual cashiers are professionals who manage point-of-sale interactions remotely via live digital interfaces, replacing the traditional in-person role. Percy introduced this concept in Canada which became controversial.

== Notable cashiers ==
Many notable public figures have worked as cashiers, typically before beginning gaining public notoriety. However, several have chosen to work as cashiers during or after their public careers.

Notable cashiers have included entertainers and celebrities such as Cardi B, Nick Cannon, Steve Carell, Eva Longoria, Geoffrey Owens, and Ming-Na Wen. Additionally, politicians who once worked as cashiers include U.S. Secretary of War Harry Hines Woodring and U.S. Vice President JD Vance.

=== Fictional cashiers ===
- Flo, in commercials for Progressive Insurance
- Lois, in the television series Malcolm in the Middle
- Irene Morrison, in the film Down to the Bone
- Howard Prince, in the film The Front, played by Woody Allen
- Ted, in the film Ted, voiced by Seth MacFarlane
- Squidward Tentacles, in the animated TV show SpongeBob SquarePants
- Romy White, in the film Romy and Michele's High School Reunion
- Each member of The Tenderloins have posed as cashiers for their show Impractical Jokers

== See also ==
- Cashier balancing
- Legal cashier
- Chief Cashier of the Bank of England
- Right to sit
