= Shoeless Joe's =

Sports bar franchise in Canada

Shoeless Joe's Sports Grill
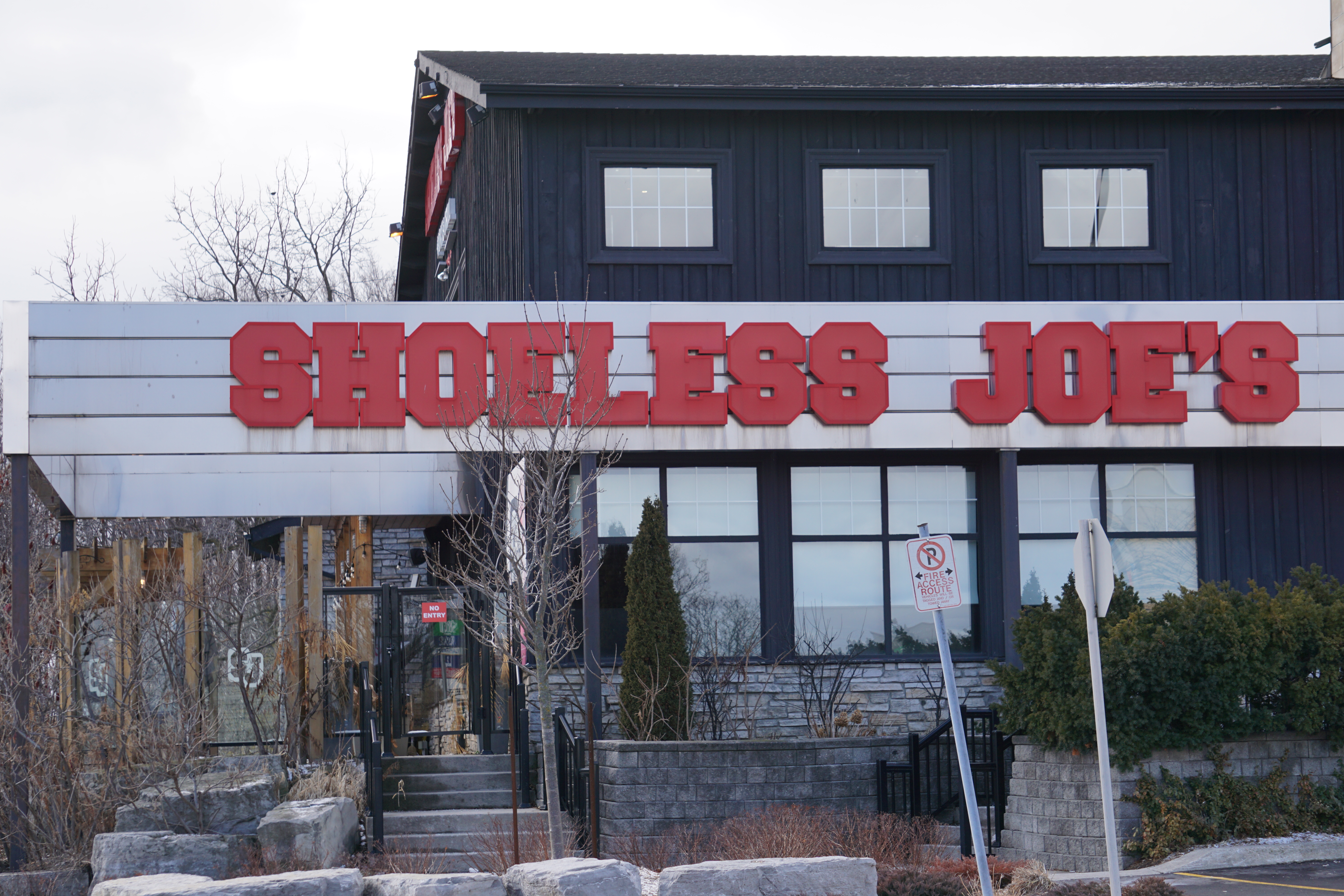
- Shoeless Joe's in Burlington, Ontario
- Industry: Food industry
- Founded: 1985; 41 years ago in Toronto, Ontario, Canada
- Number of locations: 30
- Area served: Ontario & Saskatchewan, Canada
- Owner: Foodtastic
- Website: shoelessjoes.ca

Shoeless Joe's is a sports-themed restaurant chain located in two provinces in Canada, now part of the Foodtastic group. The chain was founded during 1985 in Toronto, Ontario, but now has over 30 locations. The franchise is known for their large locations constantly showing sports entertainment TV channels.

The name is a reference to a former Major League Baseball player named Shoeless Joe Jackson.

== Restaurant expansion ==
The restaurant brand started in 1985, but as of 2016 is one of the 27 brands totalling 1,200 locations of the food industry giant Foodtastic group. The original location was on Eglinton Avenue in Toronto, Ontario, as a local community sports bar. Investor Fred Lopreiato purchased it within several years, and the first franchised location opened in 1991. In later years, he was joined by his son, Frank Lopreiato, as President of the Company. From 2011 until 2014, the franchise changed its image from that of a local sports bar to a "premium sports grill aesthetic." By 2014, there were over 34 locations in Ontario, in locations such as Courtney Park, Mississauga, with most franchised.

Shoeless Joe's Sports Grill reopened after renovation and a change in ownership on December 12, 2016, located in the Whitby Entertainment Centrum in Whitby. In July 2016, it was reported that the developer Stonebridge was planning to open a Shoeless Joe's restaurant in Peterborough, Canada. The two former restaurants in the city had closed, with a new 4,560-square-foot building planned.

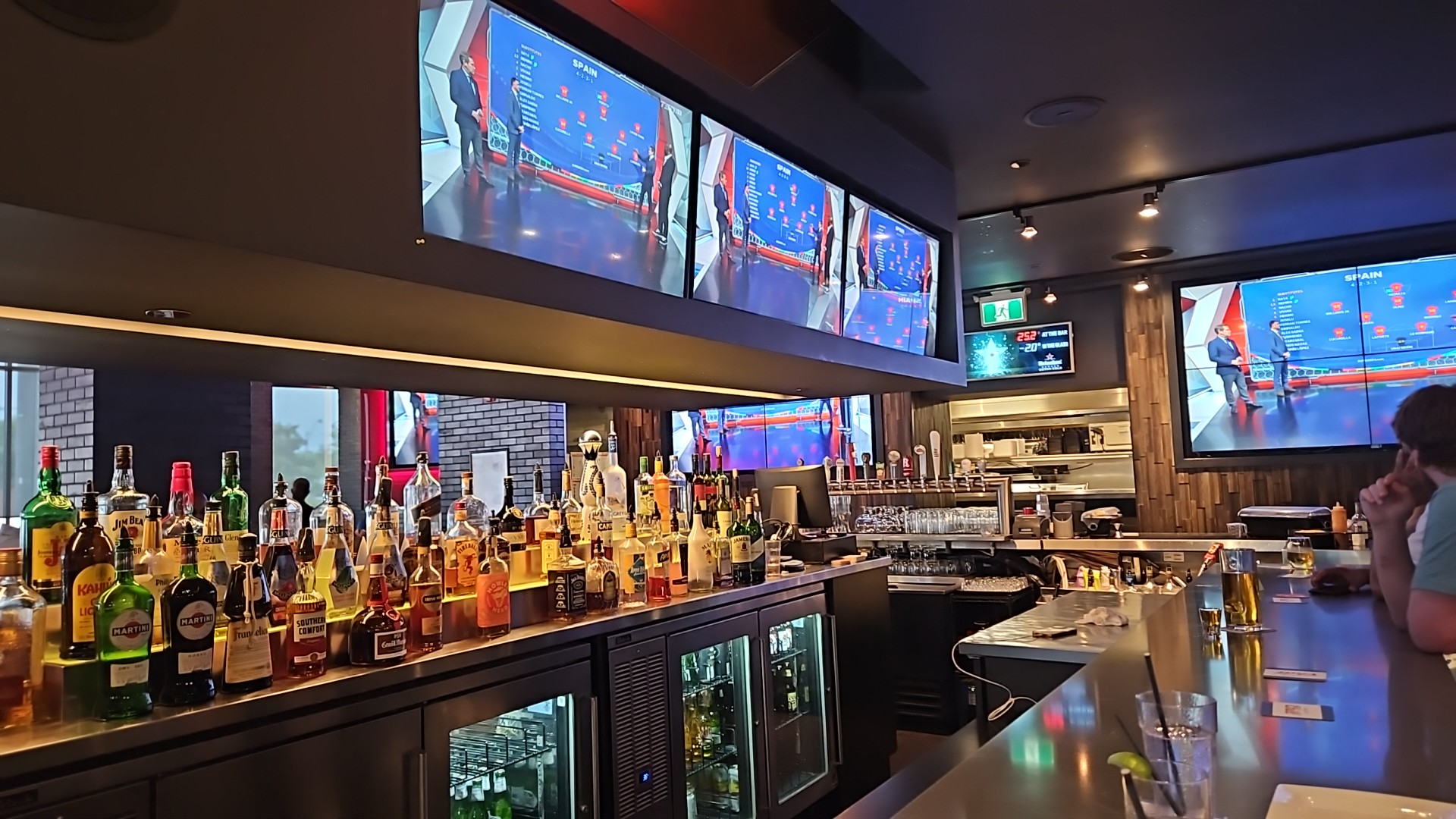
Shoeless Joe's sports bar franchise, St. Clair West, Toronto

=== Restaurant locations ===
The Shoeless Joe's franchise locations as of spring 2026 are:

==== Ontario ====
- Aurora
- Brantford
- Cornwall
- Dufferin, North York, Toronto
- Fallsview, Niagara Falls
- Georgetown
- Guelph
- Hamilton
- Innisfil
- Kemptville
- Napanee
- Orangeville
- Orleans
- Peterborough
- Pickering
- Queens Quay, Toronto
- Richmond Hill
- Stockyards, St. Clair West, Toronto
- Stoney Creek
- Sudbury
- Trenton
- Vaughan

==== Saskatchewan ====
- Saskatoon

== See also ==
- List of Canadian restaurant chains
