= Matthew Corrin =

Canadian businessman (born 1982)

- Born: 1982 (age 43–44); Winnipeg, Manitoba, Canada
- Education: University of Western Ontario (BA)
- Occupation: Entrepreneur
- Known for: Founding Freshii
- Spouse: Kate Danson
- Children: 2

Matthew Corrin (born 1982) is a Canadian businessman. He is the founder, chairman and former CEO of Freshii.

== Early life ==
Corrin was born in Winnipeg, Manitoba in 1982. He attended St. John's-Ravenscourt School and the University of Western Ontario where he graduated with a Bachelor of Arts degree.

== Career ==
Corrin worked in New York City for fashion designer Oscar de la Renta when he came across the fresh delis and wanted to create his own fresh food business. In 2005, he started Freshii with the first location opening in Toronto, Ontario.

In 2022, Corrin stepped down as CEO of Freshii to focus on a new venture, Percy, which outsources cashiers at restaurants via videoconferencing.

About the same time in 2022, the sales for the Freshii stores were plummeting. Corrin was able to pull off a sale to Foodtastic for a very high amount of money. The sale to Foodtastic led the Franchisees into a failure state. Many stores failed under Corrin’s leadership, but the number escalated significantly after Foodtastic acquisition of the FRESHII brand.
