= Britain Quay =

Street and quay in Dublin, Ireland

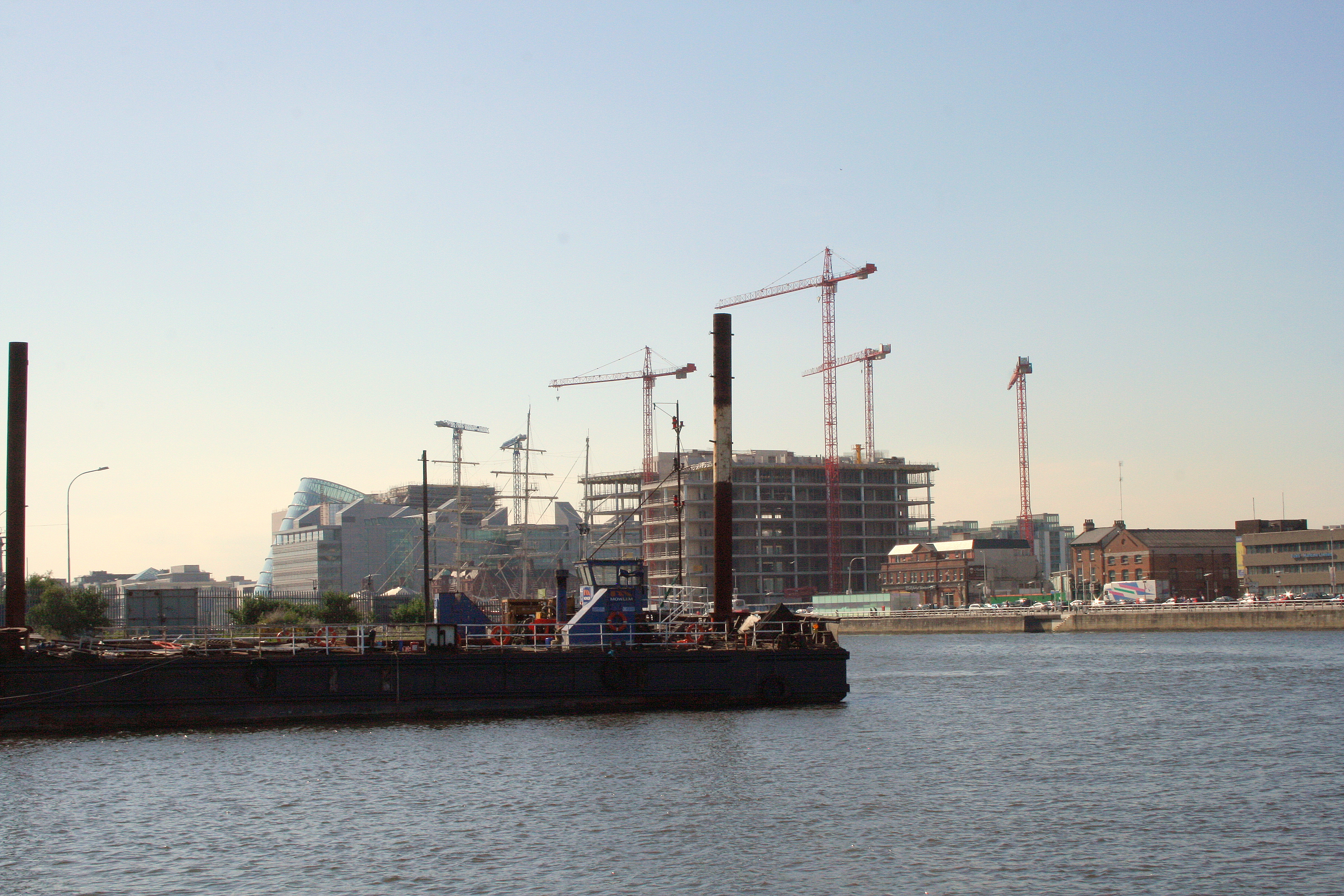
- Britain Quay (foreground) with North Wall Quay in background (2009)

- Location within Dublin
- Native name: Cé na Breataine (Irish)
- Namesake: Great Britain
- Length: 200 m (660 ft)
- Width: 23 metres (75 ft)
- Location: Dublin, Ireland
- Postal code: D02
- Coordinates: 53.345°N 6.231°W
- west end: Blood Stoney Road
- north end: Sir John Rogerson's Quay

Construction
- Construction start: 1790s

Other
- Known for: U2 Tower site, offices

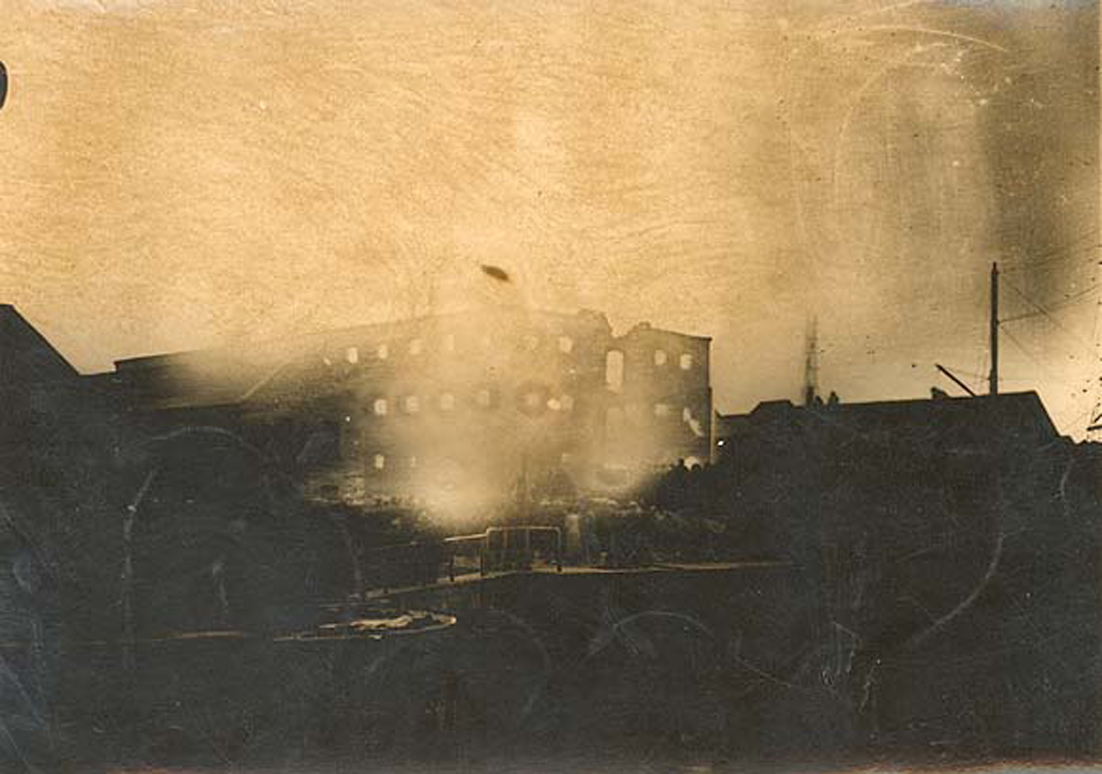
Chemical works fire, Britain Quay and Sir John Rogerson's Quay (1920)

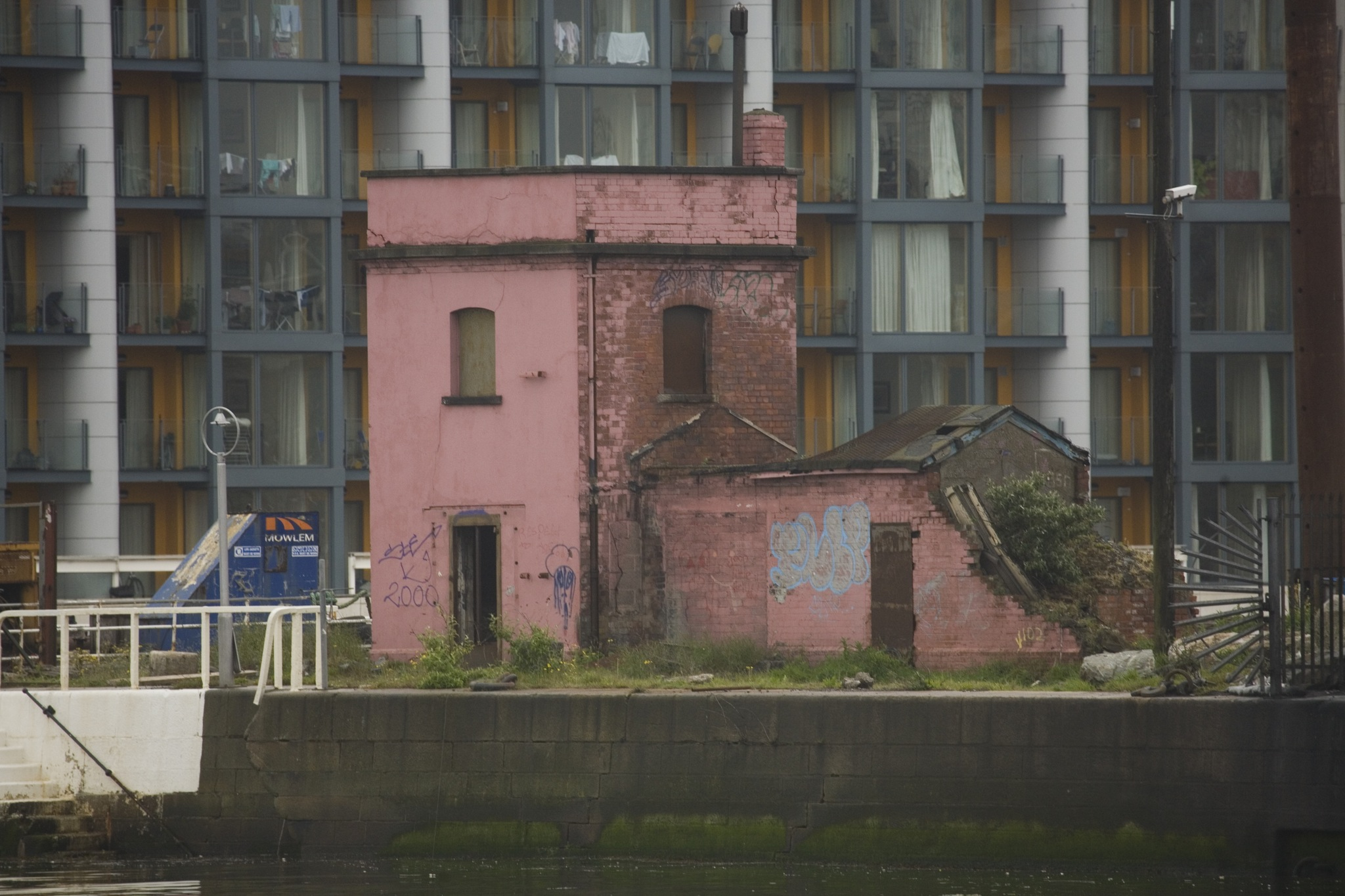
The Hailing Station, Dublin (1907 - 2007)

Britain Quay (Irish: Cé na Breataine) is a street and quay in Dublin on the south bank of the River Liffey between Sir John Rogerson's Quay and the confluence of the River Liffey, River Dodder and Grand Canal.

Originally known as Great Britain Quay, the quay was built in the 1790s as part of the opening of Grand Canal Dock. The quay was widened in the mid-19th century, with works undertaken to dredge and deepen the riverbed alongside the quay wall in the 1870s. In 1873, Great Britain Quay was recorded as being 250 feet (76 m) in length.

Part of the working Dublin Port facilities for several hundred years, the quay was a docking point for coal carrying cargo vessels, and the site of a number of industrial buildings – including a chemical works which was destroyed by fire in the early 20th century. By this time the quay's structures also included a navigation "hailing station" at the junction with Sir John Rogerson's Quay. A time ball sat on top of this station which, when operated remotely from Dunsink Observatory, signaled that it was 1pm. In the early 21st century this station, by then a protected structure, was demolished by the Dublin Docklands Development Authority. This demolition occurred as part of development works at the corner between Sir John Rogerson's Quay and Britain Quay in preparation for the construction of the U2 Tower, which would have been Ireland's tallest building. That project was later scrapped in the economic downturn, and ultimately Capital Dock was erected on the site (Ireland's tallest building on its completion in 2018).

Remaining buildings on the Record of Protected Structures on Britain Quay include a former lock keeper's cottage and the three nearby canal locks which separate Grand Canal Dock from the River Liffey. These three locks, named Westmoreland Lock, Buckingham Lock, and Camden Lock, were built in 1796.

A public transport bridge (carrying pedestrians, cyclists, and public transport only) had been proposed to connect Britain Quay to York Road across the River Dodder. As of early 2018, the proposed bridge (described in planning documents under the interim project name of the "Dodder Public Transportation Opening Bridge") was in an initial public consultation phase.

== See also ==
- Dublin quays
