= Foodtastic =

Canadian restaurant holding company

- Type: Private
- Industry: Restaurant
- Founder: Peter Mammas and Lawrence Mammas
- Headquarters: Montreal, Quebec, Canada
- Website: foodtastic.ca

Foodtastic is a Canadian restaurant holding company headquartered in Montreal, Canada. Founded in 2016 by brothers Lawrence and Peter Mammas, the company has rapidly expanded its portfolio through the acquisition and expansion of established brands. As of now, Foodtastic manages over 1,200 restaurants across Canada, as well as internationally.

Founded as a loose association of various Quebec restaurants, including Nickels Grill & Bar linked to Céline Dion and René Angélil, Foodtastic has expanded in a $1.2 billion empire of fast food, fast casual, pubs, and coffee chains.

== Acquisitions ==
In May, 2021 Foodtastic acquired Copper Branch, one of the largest plant based chains in the world with locations in Canada, France, and the Netherlands. Pita Pit was acquired in August, 2021. In November 2021, they purchased Second Cup from Aegis Brands Inc, with plans to expand into the suburbs.

In 2022, Foodtastic acquired Shoeless Joe’s Sports Grill, Quesada Burritos & Tacos, and Freshii. As well as acquiring the Prime Pubs subsidiary of Prime Restaurants from Recipe Unlimited; which includes Fionn MacCool's, Tir Nan Og, Paddy Flaherty's, and D'Arcy McGee's.

In 2023, Foodtastic acquired Noodlebox and Milestones. As well as partnering with O'Tacos to bring the French franchise to Canada with stores expected to open in 2024 but as of February 2025 none are currently open.

In 2024, Foodtastic opened the first Jimmy John's franchise in Canada, on November 19, in Toronto, Ontario at Sherway Gardens with plans to open 200 locations. They also acquired Archibald Restaurants in November.

In May 2026, Foodtastic has signed a master franchising agreement with Inspire Brands to bring Dunkin' back to Canada, with plans to open hundreds of locations across the country. The first Canadian Dunkin’ is expected to open in late 2026 or early 2027. In June 2026, Foodtastic also acquired Kinton Ramen.

== Brands ==
- Archibald Restaurants
- Big Rig Kitchen & Brewery
- Bācaro Pizzeria
- Carlos & Pepe's
- Chocolato
- Copper Branch
- Enoteca Monza Pizzeria Moderna
- Fionn MacCool's
- Freshii
- Fusée Rôtisserie
- Gatto Matto
- Kinton Ramen
- La Belle & La Boeuf Burger Bar
- La Chambre
- Milestones Grill and Bar
- Nickels Grill & Bar
- Noodlebox
- Pita Pit (except the USA franchise)
- Quesada Burritos & Tacos
- Rotisseries Benny
- Rôtisserie Au Coq
- Second Cup
- Shoeless Joe's
- Souvlaki Bar
- Tommy Café

=== Canadian Franchise Operator ===
- Jimmy John’s
- O’Tacos
- Dunkin'

== See also ==
- List of Canadian restaurant chains
