= Ryan Reaves =

Canadian ice hockey player (born 1987)

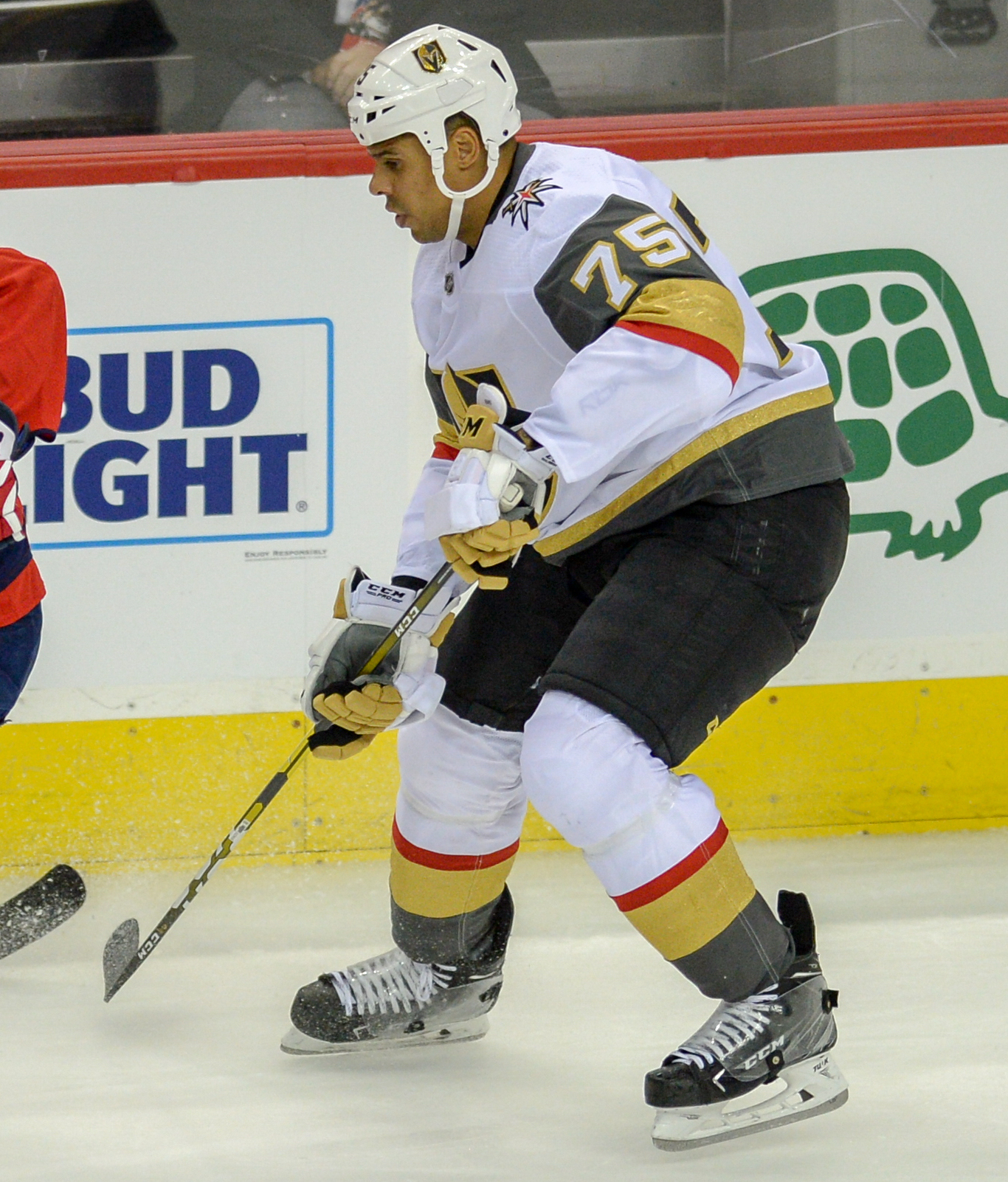
- Reaves with the Vegas Golden Knights in 2018
- Born: January 20, 1987 (age 39) Winnipeg, Manitoba, Canada
- Height: 6 ft 2 in (188 cm)
- Weight: 225 lb (102 kg; 16 st 1 lb)
- Position: Right wing
- Shot: Right
- Played for: St. Louis Blues; Pittsburgh Penguins; Vegas Golden Knights; New York Rangers; Minnesota Wild; Toronto Maple Leafs; San Jose Sharks
- NHL draft: 156th overall, 2005; St. Louis Blues
- Playing career: 2007–2026

Ryan Reaves (born January 20, 1987), nicknamed "Reavo", is a Canadian-American former professional ice hockey player. He played as a right winger for 16 seasons in the National Hockey League (NHL) for the St. Louis Blues, Pittsburgh Penguins, Vegas Golden Knights, New York Rangers, Minnesota Wild, Toronto Maple Leafs, and San Jose Sharks. He is the son of former gridiron football player, Willard Reaves, who played in the Canadian Football League (CFL) and National Football League (NFL).

== Playing career ==
=== Youth ===
Reaves began playing hockey at age five and football at age eight. As a youth, Reaves played in the 2000 Quebec International Pee-Wee Hockey Tournament with the Winnipeg South Monarchs minor ice hockey team. Although he played both football and hockey growing up, after tearing his posterior cruciate ligament during a hockey tournament, he was forced to forfeit football as a sport. His torn ligament made him unable to compete in the football season prior to his Western Hockey League draft year. Reaves was eventually drafted 36th overall by the Brandon Wheat Kings in the 2002 WHL bantam draft. Despite his draft selection, Reaves continued to play for the St. John's-Ravenscourt School hockey team where he led them to the 2004 McDonald's Provincial High School Hockey Championship. Reaves joined the Wheat Kings for his rookie campaign during the 2004–05 season. Prior to the 2005–06 season, Reaves was named an alternate captain alongside Mark Derlago, Riley Day, and Derek LeBlanc.

=== Professional ===
==== St. Louis Blues ====
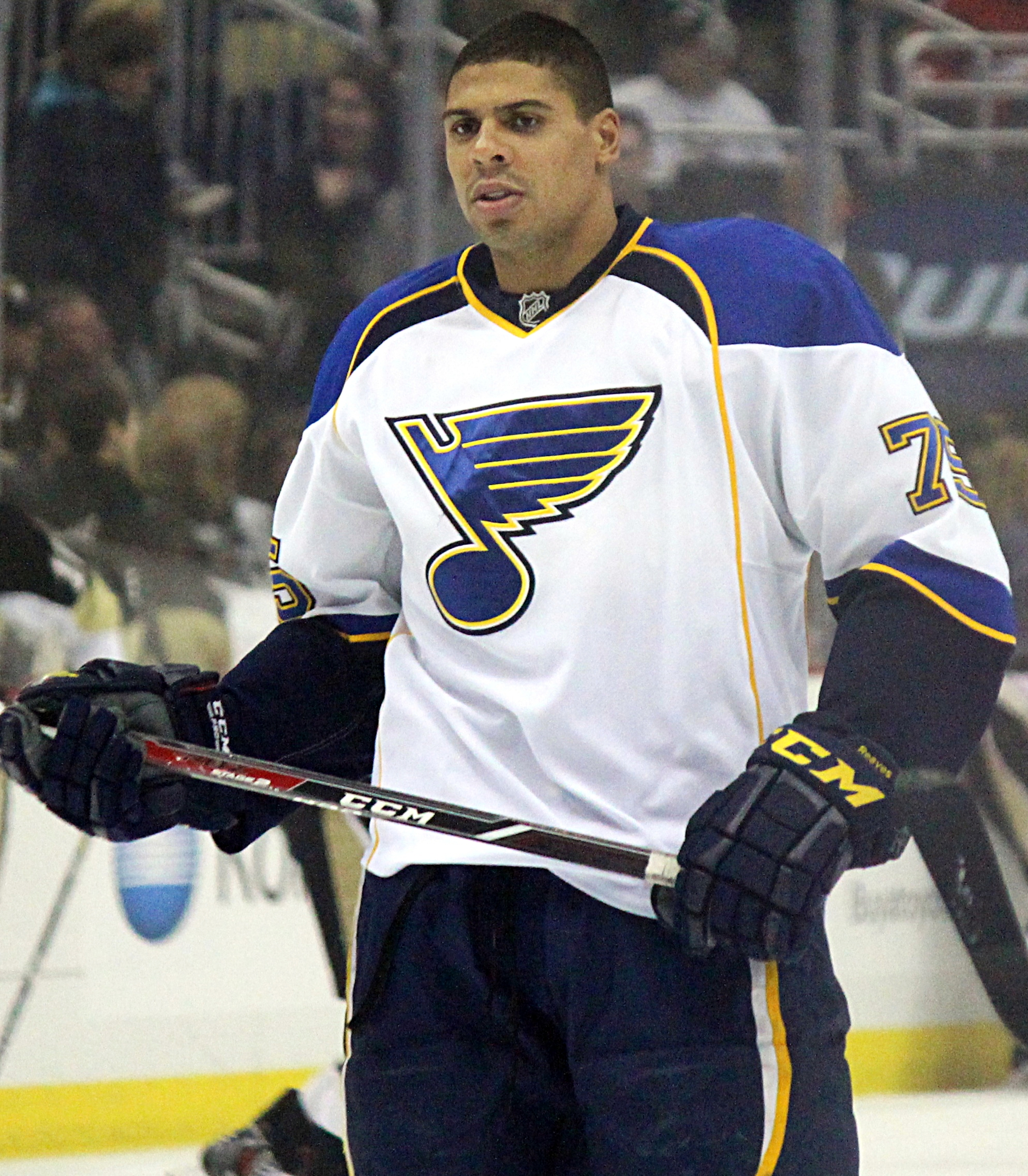
Reaves with the St. Louis Blues in March 2014.

Reaves was drafted by the St. Louis Blues 156th overall in the 2005 NHL entry draft. On May 15, 2007, Reaves signed a three-year entry-level contract with the St. Louis Blues. At the conclusion of his major junior season, Reaves attended the Blues 2007 training camp and was reassigned to their American Hockey League affiliate, the Peoria Rivermen. While playing with the Rivermen during the 2007–08 season, he suffered an injury in a game against the Rockford IceHogs and was reassigned to the Blues ECHL affiliate, the Alaska Aces.

Reaves was recalled from the Peoria Rivermen by the Blues on October 10, 2010, after Cam Janssen suffered a concussion from a hit to the head in the Blues' season opener on October 9. Reaves made his NHL debut on October 11, 2010, where he served 15 penalty minutes in the Blues' 5–1 win over the Anaheim Ducks. He was returned to Peoria after two games with the Blues as Vladimír Sobotka returned from the injured reserve list. He later scored his first NHL goal on January 12, 2011, again against the Ducks, on goaltender Jonas Hiller.

Reaves' 2015–16 season was cut short due to a knee injury and he returned to the Blues' lineup weighing 225 instead of his usual 230. During the offseason, he trained with Blues assistant coach/video coach Sean Ferrell.

==== Pittsburgh Penguins ====
On June 23, 2017, after seven seasons with the Blues, Reaves was traded to the Pittsburgh Penguins along with a 2017 second-round pick (51st overall) in exchange for Oskar Sundqvist and Pittsburgh's 2017 first-round pick (31st overall). In the 2017–18 season, Reaves added muscle to the Penguins lower lines, providing 4 goals and 8 points in 58 games.

==== Vegas Golden Knights ====
On February 23, 2018, Reaves was involved in a trade with the Vegas Golden Knights. The Penguins received Tobias Lindberg from the Golden Knights in exchange for Reaves as part of a three-way trade also involving the Ottawa Senators. Reaves scored the series-winning goal over the Winnipeg Jets that qualified the Golden Knights for the 2018 Stanley Cup Final. He also scored in game 1 of the Stanley Cup Final in a 6–4 Golden Knights victory, though the Washington Capitals would come back and win the next four games for the Stanley Cup.

On July 1, 2018, Reaves signed a two-year contract with the Golden Knights. He recorded a career-high nine goals and 20 points the subsequent season.

On June 15, 2020, the Golden Knights signed Reaves to a two-year, $3.5 million contract extension.

On May 31, 2021, Reaves was suspended for five games in the second round of the 2021 Stanley Cup playoffs for an injury on Colorado Avalanche skater Ryan Graves.

==== New York Rangers ====
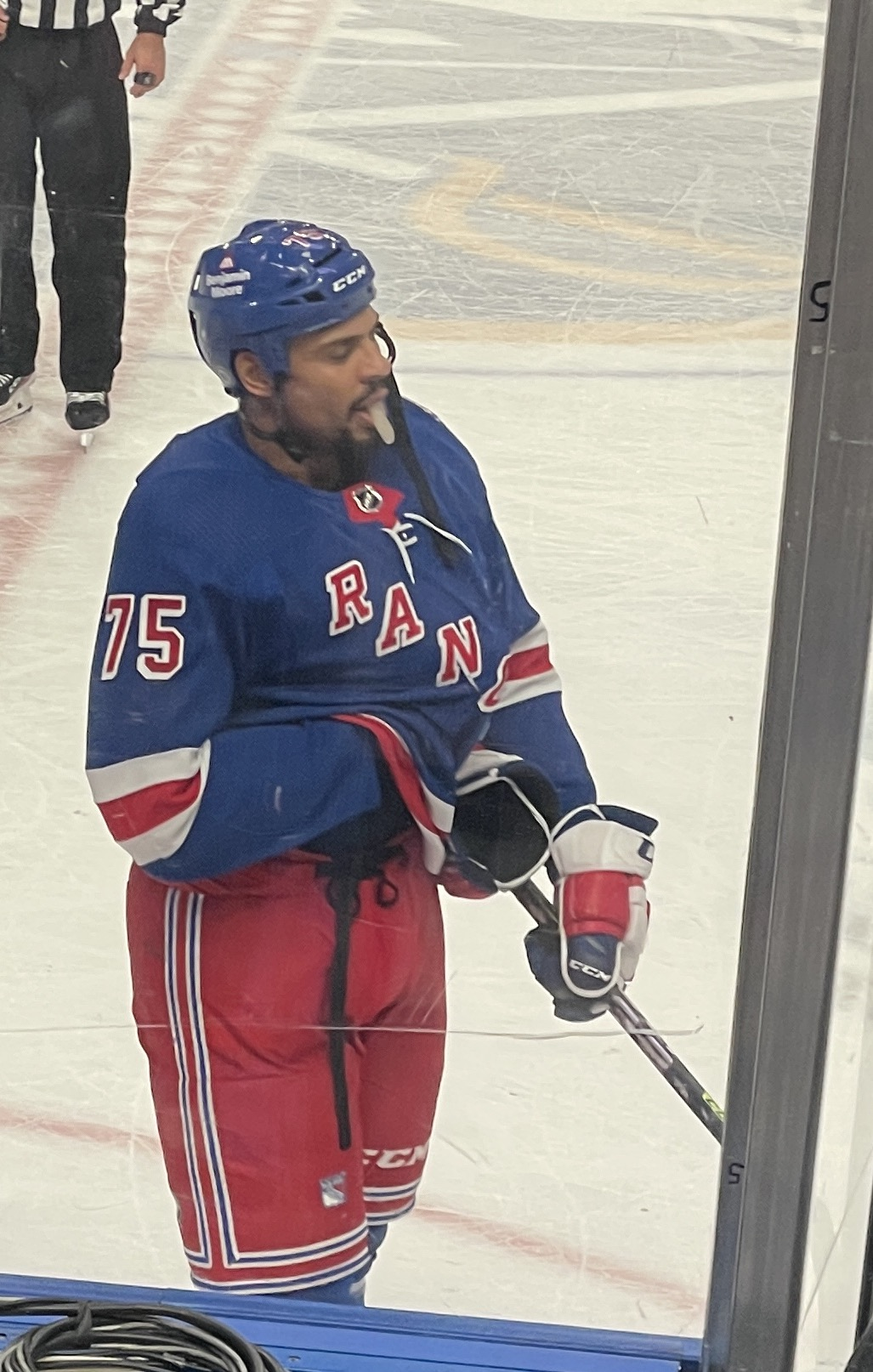
Reaves with the New York Rangers in December 2021

On July 29, 2021, the Golden Knights traded Reaves to the New York Rangers for a 2022 third-round draft pick, and on July 31, he signed a one-year contract extension with the team.

==== Minnesota Wild ====
After going scoreless in 12 games with the Rangers to open the 2022–23 season, Reaves was traded by New York to the Minnesota Wild in exchange for a 2025 fifth-round pick on November 23, 2022.

==== Toronto Maple Leafs ====
After opting to hear offers on the free agent market, Reaves signed a three-year, $4.05 million contract with the Toronto Maple Leafs on July 1, 2023.

==== San Jose Sharks and retirement ====
On July 10, 2025, Reaves was traded to the San Jose Sharks in exchange for Henry Thrun. On September 16, 2026, Reaves announced his retirement through an Instagram post.

== Playing style ==
Reaves has been described in the NHL as an enforcer, a player who is known for fighting, protecting his teammates and intimidating the opposition. Despite being known specifically for that role, he is often used on checking lines for aggressive forechecking sequences.

Reaves' playstyle has often led to run-ins with the NHL Department of Player Safety. He has been suspended four times during his NHL career for a total of eleven games (including three playoff games), and has been fined an additional three times. During the second round of the 2021 Stanley Cup playoffs, Reaves received a match penalty for attempting to injure Colorado Avalanche's Ryan Graves, after kneeling on his neck and pulling parts of his hair out. This incident resulted in a 2 game suspension from the NHL. Reaves was suspended for game 7 of the Golden Knights' second round against the Vancouver Canucks in the 2020 Stanley Cup playoffs for an illegal hit to the head of Vancouver Canucks forward Tyler Motte, and was also suspended three games after boarding San Jose Sharks defenseman Matt Tennyson in 2016. Reaves was suspended for five games for an illegal check to the head of Edmonton Oilers defenseman Darnell Nurse during a game between the Oilers and the Toronto Maple Leafs on November 16, 2024.

== Activism ==
Reaves organized several demonstrations of support for the Black Lives Matter movement after the murder of George Floyd in 2020. Reaves, who was one of only two Black players on the roster for the Vegas Golden Knights, organized his team in a show of support before their exhibition game against the Arizona Coyotes on July 30, 2020. During the national anthem, they locked arms and bowed their heads. He decided on locking arms because not everyone on the team was comfortable kneeling during the anthem.

Several days later, on August 3, 2020, Reaves approached Tyler Seguin of the Dallas Stars before the two teams played each other. He told Seguin that he planned to kneel during the anthem. Seguin agreed to join him. Seguin then told the locker room about what he planned to do, and Jason Dickinson from the Stars volunteered to join him. Reaves, who is Black, and three white players—Seguin, Dickinson, and Vegas Golden Knights goalie Robin Lehner—knelt for both the American and Canadian national anthems.

== Personal life ==
Reaves is the son of Willard Reaves, a former professional football player in the Canadian Football League and National Football League. At the time of his birth in Winnipeg, his father was a member of the Winnipeg Blue Bombers. His brother Jordan Reaves is a player with the Edmonton Elks. He also has an older sister named Regina.

Reaves and his wife Alanna have two children together, Kane and Kamilla.

Reaves holds both American and Canadian citizenship.

Reaves has made the claim he is a descendant of Bass Reeves, a former slave who was an early Black deputy U.S. marshal; Reeves' life is the focus of the 2023 TV series Lawmen: Bass Reeves.

== Career statistics ==
			Regular season					Playoffs
Season	Team	League	GP	G	A	Pts	PIM	GP	G	A	Pts	PIM
2003–04	St. John's-Ravenscourt School	HS-MB	19	20	12	32	82	—	—	—	—	—
2004–05	Brandon Wheat Kings	WHL	64	7	9	16	79	23	2	4	6	43
2005–06	Brandon Wheat Kings	WHL	68	14	14	28	91	6	0	1	1	8
2006–07	Brandon Wheat Kings	WHL	69	15	20	35	76	11	1	4	5	19
2007–08	Alaska Aces	ECHL	9	2	0	2	42	2	0	0	0	22
2007–08	Peoria Rivermen	AHL	31	4	3	7	46	—	—	—	—	—
2008–09	Peoria Rivermen	AHL	57	8	9	17	130	4	0	0	0	2
2009–10	Peoria Rivermen	AHL	76	4	7	11	167	—	—	—	—	—
2010–11	Peoria Rivermen	AHL	50	4	6	10	146	—	—	—	—	—
2010–11	St. Louis Blues	NHL	28	2	2	4	78	—	—	—	—	—
2011–12	St. Louis Blues	NHL	60	3	1	4	124	2	0	0	0	0
2012–13	Orlando Solar Bears	ECHL	13	6	3	9	34	—	—	—	—	—
2012–13	St. Louis Blues	NHL	43	4	2	6	79	6	0	0	0	2
2013–14	St. Louis Blues	NHL	63	2	6	8	126	6	0	0	0	6
2014–15	St. Louis Blues	NHL	81	6	6	12	116	6	1	0	1	0
2015–16	St. Louis Blues	NHL	64	3	1	4	68	5	0	0	0	7
2016–17	St. Louis Blues	NHL	80	7	6	13	104	11	0	0	0	8
2017–18	Pittsburgh Penguins	NHL	58	4	4	8	84	—	—	—	—	—
2017–18	Vegas Golden Knights	NHL	21	0	2	2	10	10	2	0	2	18
2018–19	Vegas Golden Knights	NHL	80	9	11	20	74	7	0	0	0	17
2019–20	Vegas Golden Knights	NHL	71	8	7	15	47	19	0	4	4	14
2020–21	Vegas Golden Knights	NHL	37	1	4	5	27	12	0	1	1	16
2021–22	New York Rangers	NHL	69	5	8	13	43	18	0	0	0	12
2022–23	New York Rangers	NHL	12	0	0	0	12	—	—	—	—	—
2022–23	Minnesota Wild	NHL	61	5	10	15	31	6	0	0	0	14
2023–24	Toronto Maple Leafs	NHL	49	4	2	6	49	5	0	1	1	2
2024–25	Toronto Maple Leafs	NHL	35	0	2	2	28	—	—	—	—	—
2024–25	Toronto Marlies	AHL	3	1	0	1	0	—	—	—	—	—
2025–26	San Jose Sharks	NHL	50	3	0	3	37	—	—	—	—	—
NHL totals			962	66	74	140	1,137	113	3	6	9	116

== See also ==
- Black players in ice hockey
