= Cashier balancing =

Process of counting and comparing money in cash register with accounting entries

Cashier balancing or cashing up is the process of a cashier counting the money in a cash register at the end of a business day or working shift. The process is usually conducted in businesses such as grocery stores, restaurants and banks, and makes the cashier responsible for the money in their cash register.

== The balancing process ==
The closing contents of the cash drawer must match the number expected on the X-report or Z-report, or "Cashier Closeoff" or "Signoff Report" generated by the cash register, usually within a certain allowed variance.

The procedure may vary drastically from store to store. For example, most modern retailers remove only larger bills for deposit, leaving smaller bills or coins in the cash drawer to be used as change. In many retailers, the "starting amount" or "float" will fluctuate from shift to shift depending on the change left in the till. In some variants, credit or debit chits will be added like cash to the total contents of the cash drawer.

In order to balance (or settle) the cash drawer, first, the manager (or sometimes the cashier) prepares to count the money in the register. The drawer is removed from the register and often taken to a back office for counting. Then, any large bills, checks, and coupons are removed and put to the side. Next, the person counting the money counts it back to its "starting amount" (the amount of money that was in the drawer at the beginning of the shift). In the process, other bills and change will taken to the side and put with the larger bills. Once the drawer is reset back to its starting amount for the next cashier's shift, it is either placed in the safe or given to the next shift.

== Deposits during shift ==
"Drops" or "pickups" or "deposits" may happen during a shift if the cashier or the manager sees there is too much cash in the drawer. This is to limit the risk of robbery.

Cash back on debit transactions is a similar concept to a deposit as the cash in the drawer is replaced by money directly placed into the store's bank account and offers the customer the advantage of not having to make a separate transaction at an ATM. In this way, Cash back is generally beneficial to both the customer and the retailer, and offers the customer the ability request change or other denominations not generally available from ATMs.

Some POS systems will prompt the cashier to make a deposit. Procedures will vary from retailer to retailer, but in general the large bills are removed from the till and are either manually counted by the cashier or by a manager and are "dropped" into an inaccessible safe. The deposit will be recorded in the cashier's POS and will therefore no longer be expected in the cashier's drawer at the end of his or her shift, but will remain part of the final accountability at the end of the cashier's shift.

== Cashier accountability ==
Now, the bills and change that were put off to the side get counted, along with the checks from the cashier's drawer. This is what makes up the cashier's sales deposit. Most cash registers can print up a sales slip and money tendering slip that tells how much money the cashier made in sales and how much money the cashier is accounted for. The manager refers to this slip when counting the cashier's sales money. If the money counted does not match what is on the balancing slip, the cashier may be over or short (in cash). Whenever a discrepancy such as overages or shortages occur, the money is usually counted again to ensure that the amount is correct. The over/short can always be calculated by subtracting the amount of money in the drawer (exclude the "starting amount") from the amount printed on the cashier tendering slip, or balancing slip.

Depending on the amount of over/short and circumstances involved, disciplinary actions may vary. Cashiers often lose their jobs to cash overages/shortages, either for repeated violations or for large overages or shortages. In most establishments, termination on the first offense is usually for $100.00 over/short or more, and can result in criminal charges against the cashier.

Shortages usually result from bills sticking together or from the cashier giving back too much change, or maybe even "pocketing" some money from the register. "Quick Change" scams are common, as a dishonest customer attempts to defraud a cashier by saying verbally, "And I'll pay with a $50" but only passing the cashier a smaller bill hoping the cashier will provide change as for a larger bill, or doing other things to attempt to confuse the cashier. In any instance of an unusual transaction, the cashier should print and save a duplicate receipt in order that the store's Loss Prevention may investigate the transaction should the till not balance.

Overages occur from taking too much money from customers, not entering the tender correctly other otherwise issuing incorrect change, or not entering items in the point of sale terminal properly.

Honesty and accuracy are paramount.

== Overages/shortages ==
Cash overages/shortages are usually expressed in several ways. This example shows how it is expressed in writing and how a register printout would show them.

Overage $12.34: is written as +12.34; is printed out as: $12.34 or +$12.34.

Shortage $12.34 is written as: -12.34; is printed out as: ($12.34) or -$12.34.
