= Nickels Grill & Bar =

Canadian casual dining restaurant chain

Nickels Deli
- Company type: Private
- Industry: Food service
- Founded: 1990 in Canada
- Founders: Céline Dion, etc.
- Headquarters: Canada
- Areas served: Canada (primarily Quebec and formerly Ontario)
- Owner: Foodtastic
- Website: Nickels Deli & Bar

Nickels is a Canadian casual dining restaurant chain. The restaurant has an extensive menu ranging from complete breakfasts to hamburgers, milkshakes, pizza, chicken, ribs, salads and a number of sandwiches, including Montreal-style smoked meat.

== History ==
Nickels was originally created by pop diva Céline Dion and four friends, who opened their first restaurant in 1990. The name came from Dion and her husband René Angélil's lucky number, 5. The parent company claims an ongoing business relationship with Dion.

Nickels has since expanded to several franchised restaurants located primarily in Quebec and Ontario. Originally designed to resemble a typical North American family diner, Nickels redesigned some of its restaurants and introduced a grill and bar concept. The most recent iteration is operating as Nickels Delicatessen with a deli and bar concept. The restaurant is known for serving Montreal-style smoked meat.

Nickels is now part of the Foodtastic group of restaurants which also includes Les Rôtisseries Benny, La Belle & La Boeuf, Souvlaki Bar, Carlos & Pepe's, Vinnie Gambini's Italian Restaurants, Bacaro, Chocolato, Big Rig, Monza and Au Coq.

== See also ==
- List of Canadian restaurant chains
