= Pita Pit =

Canadian restaurant franchise

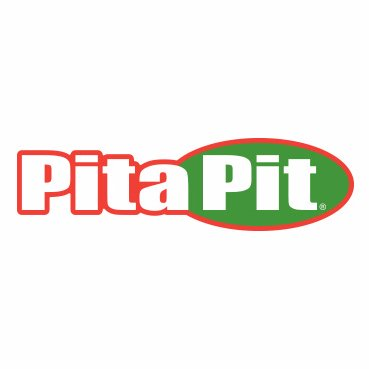

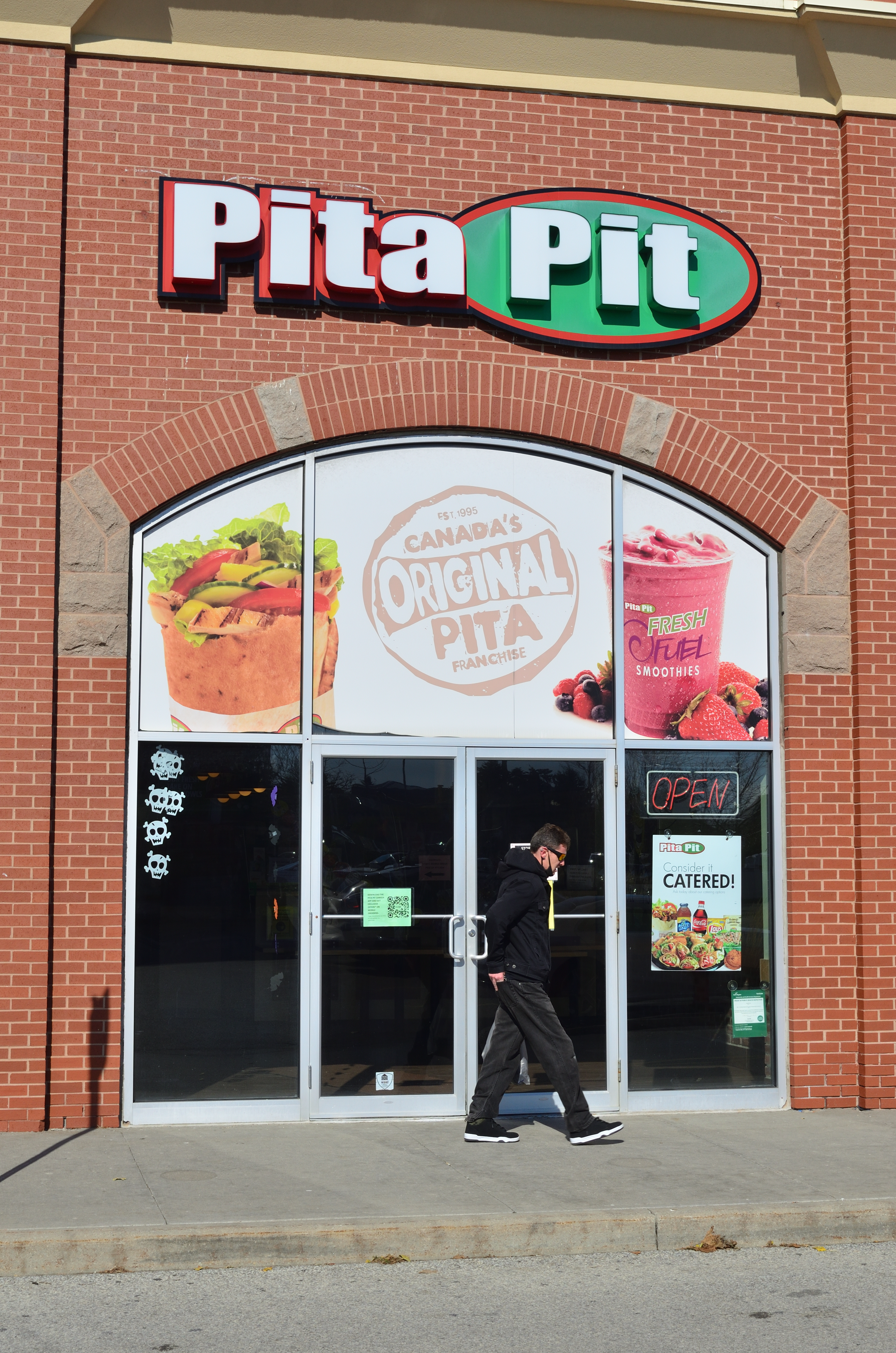
- Pita Pit in Richmond Hill, Ontario
- Type: Subsidiary
- Industry: Restaurants
- Founded: July 20, 1995; 31 years ago in Kingston, Ontario
- Founder: John Sotiriadis and Nelson Lang
- Headquarters: Kingston, Ontario (Canada); Coeur d'Alene, Idaho (US)
- Key people: John Csukor, President and CEO of Pita Pit USA; Peter Mammas, President and CEO of Foodtastic
- Parent: Parent Company (Canada): Foodtastic (September 2021 – present); Parent Company (US): Pita Pit USA 4.0, Inc. (March 2023 – present)
- Website: pitapit.ca or pitapitusa.com

Pita Pit is a quick-service restaurant franchise serving pita sandwiches with fresh vegetables, grilled meat and sauces. Worldwide, it has two separate owners. Its franchising rights for the United States and its Territories are owned by Pita Pit USA 4.0, Inc., headquartered in Coeur d’Alene, Idaho. The remainder of the franchising rights (for Canada and the rest of the world, excluding the US) are owned by Foodtastic, which is headquartered in Kingston, Ontario.

== History ==
The first shop was opened by Nelson Lang and John Sotiriadis in 1995 near Queen's University in Kingston, Ontario. The restaurant was located near the university and aimed at students in the hopes it would be "recession-proof". The store stayed open until late, providing a healthier and fresher late night food option to conventional fast food.

In 1997, Pita Pit started to expand within Canada, and in 1999 they began franchising in the United States.

The first Pita Pit location outside Canada and the United States opened in Auckland, New Zealand, in August 2007. The business was set up by Chris Henderson, a New Zealander returning from Canada, and Duane Dalton, the husband of netballer Tania Dalton.

By 2011, Pita Pit had expanded to 350 stores in Canada, the United States, New Zealand, Panama, South Korea and Brazil.

By 2020, it had over 500 locations in India, France, Brazil, Panama, Trinidad and Tobago, the United Kingdom, New Zealand, Australia, Singapore, United Arab Emirates, Ireland and Sweden.

== Pita Pit Brand Ownership ==
On April 13, 2005, the Pita Pit Brand for the United States and its Territories was sold to Pita Pit USA, Inc., which located its headquarters in Coeur d’Alene, Idaho. Thereafter, on March 7, 2023, Pita Pit USA 4.0, Inc., acquired the assets of Pita Pit USA, Inc., and became the owner of the Brand in the United States and its Territories. Pita Pit USA 4.0, Inc.’s headquarters is in the same location, Coeur d’Alene, Idaho, location as its predecessor Pita Pit USA, Inc.

On August 3, 2021, the Québécois restaurant franchiser Foodtastic had acquired the Pita Pit Brand for Canada and the rest of the world (except for in the US).

== Pita Pit International ==
=== New Zealand and Australia ===
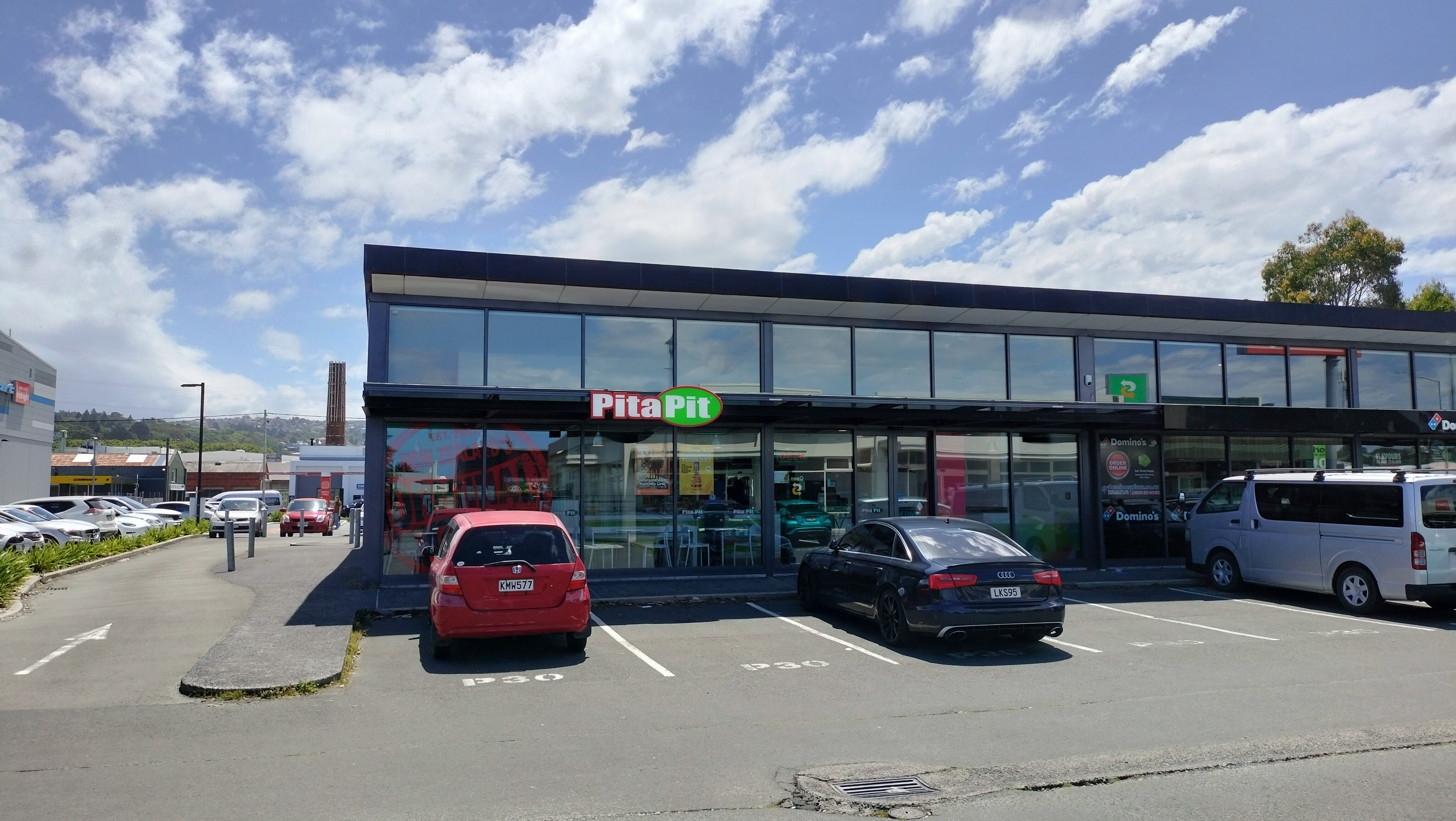
A Pita Pit store in South Dunedin, New Zealand.

Pita Pit New Zealand has 85 stores around New Zealand, including 26 in Auckland. This down from about 90 stores in 2020 and more than 100 stores in 2017, but still more than the 65 it had in 2014, and 18 it had in 2011.

The business also has nine stores from Australia, down from 14 in 2017.

The company is based in Takapuna, Auckland where it opened its first store in 2007.

Pita Pit New Zealand started actively seeking franchises in 2011, and by 2017 the vast majority of stores were franchisees.

The chain introduced a diabetes-friendly menu in 2016, and introduced a fillings limit in 2019. It started to trial virtual kitchens in 2020, after many of its stores were unable to open during the COVID-19 pandemic.
