= Legal cashier =

Type of bookkeeper for law firms

A Legal Cashier is a specialized type of bookkeeper / accountant for law firms responsible for the accounting and finance functions of a solicitor's practice such as recording day-to-day financial transactions and ensuring compliance with the Solicitors' Accounts Rules. The term "Legal Cashier" is in common use within the legal profession in England and Wales, and Outsourced Legal Cashiering is the name given to the outsourced provision of Legal Cashiering services. A number of business provide Outsourced Legal Cashiering Services.

== Solicitors' Accounts Rules ==
Depending on the category of legal work being carried out, solicitors regularly handle client monies, and due to the risk of fraud or money laundering, they must adhere to a strict Solicitors' Code of Conduct and comply with the Solicitors' Accounts Rules.

Although there is no legal requirement for a Legal Cashier to have received formal training in England and Wales, the Solicitors Accounts Rules 1998 state that "the person who maintains the books of account must have a full knowledge of the rules and the accounting requirements of solicitors' firms".

== Qualifications ==
The Institute of Legal Finance & Management (ILFM) (formed in 1978 as The Institute of Legal Cashiers) provide a formal qualification, The ILFM Diploma, to "provide a sound comprehensive and practical knowledge of the maintenance of solicitor's internal financial records, to meet compliance requirements". Candidates who pass receive a Certificate but must complete two years experience in the accounts department of a law firm before they can get associate membership or use the designatory letters.

In 2007, the University of Chester accredited an employer based training program, "Professional Certificate in Legal Account Management" which provides a foundation degree course combining academic study with workplace learning. However, this is only available to employees of Quill Pinpoint, the employer associated with the scheme.

== See also ==
- Law Society of England and Wales
- Solicitors Regulation Authority
- List of largest UK law firms
