= Sir John Rogerson's Quay =

Street in Dublin, Ireland

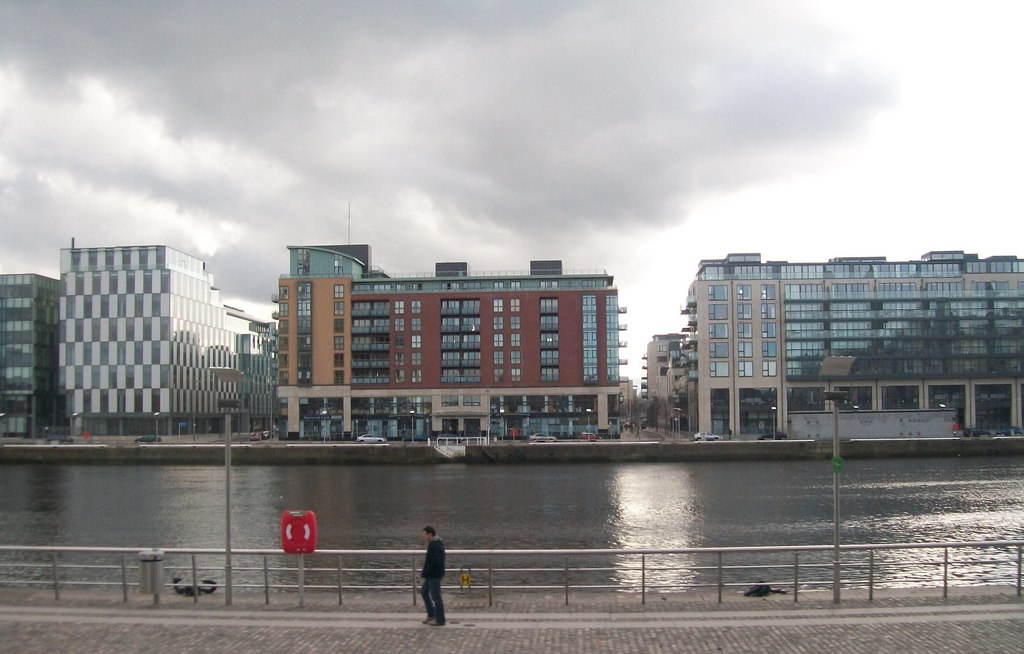
- Offices on Sir John Rogerson's Quay

- Location within Dublin
- Native name: Cé Sir John Rogerson (Irish)
- Namesake: John Rogerson
- Length: 1.0 km (0.62 mi)
- Width: 25 metres (82 ft)
- Location: Dublin, Ireland
- Postal code: D02
- Coordinates: 53.3461°N 6.2399°W
- west end: City Quay, Creighton Street
- east end: dead end

Construction
- Construction start: 1716

Other
- Known for: Diving bell, office buildings, cafés

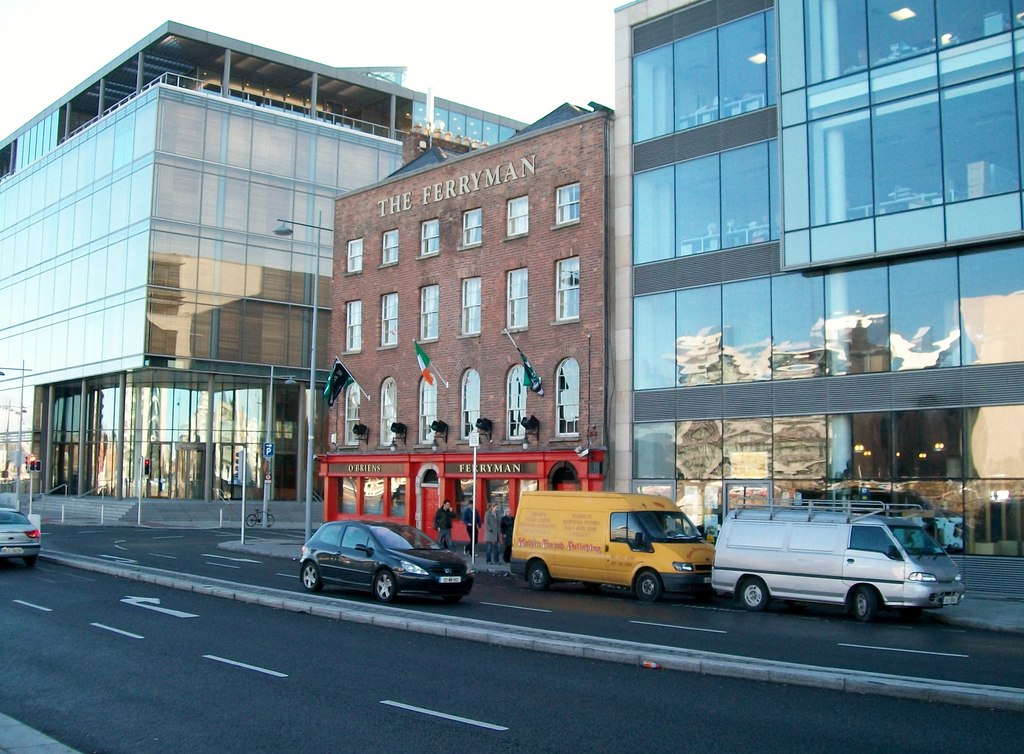
Ferryman Hotel (c.1790) flanked by later buildings on the quay

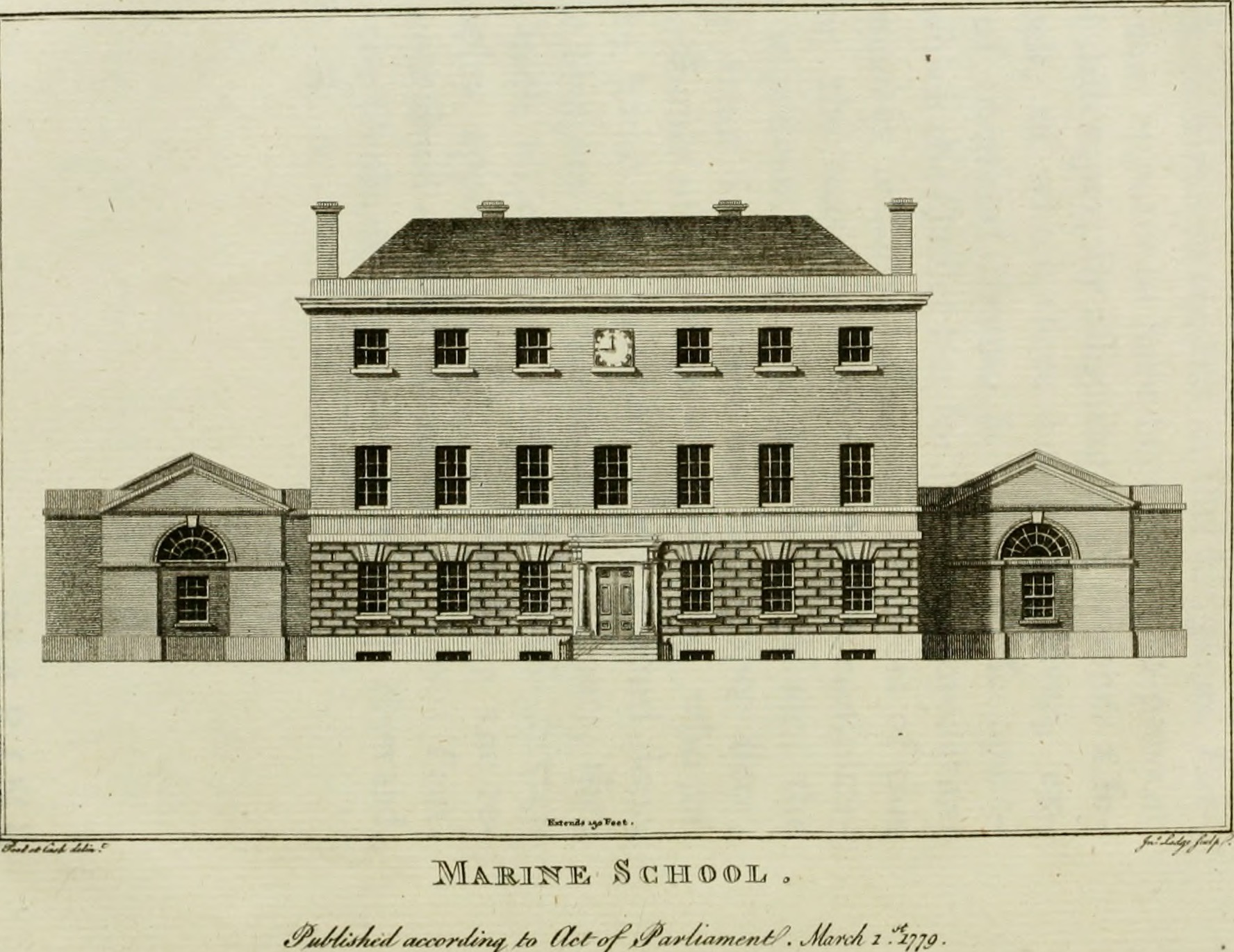
Illustration of the Royal Hibernian Marine School on Sir John Rogerson's Quay in 1779

Sir John Rogerson's Quay (Irish: Cé Sir John Rogerson) is a street and quay in Dublin on the south bank of the River Liffey between City Quay in the west and Britain Quay. Named for politician and property developer Sir John Rogerson (1648–1724), the quay was formerly part of Dublin Port. It has some of the few remaining campshire warehouses in Dublin.

== Construction and use ==
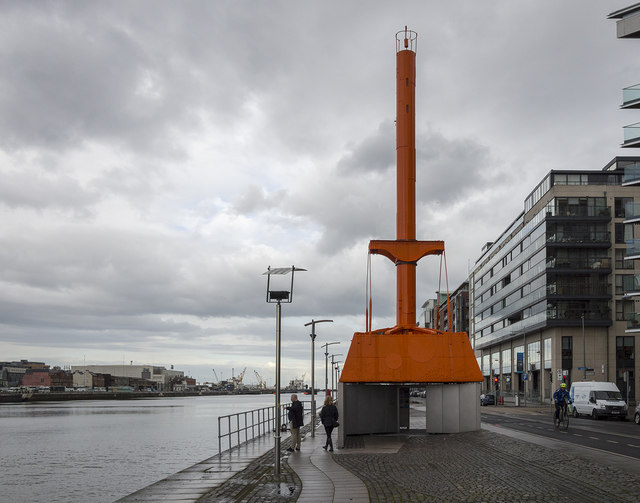
Renovated diving bell (c.1866) on Sir John Rogersons Quay

In 1713, Dublin Corporation leased lands on the Liffey to Sir John Rogerson, who was a developer and had been Lord Mayor of Dublin from 1693 to 1694. The lease of 133 acres (54 ha) on the south bank of the river (described as 'betwixt Lazy Hill and Ringsend') was conditional on Rogerson constructing a quay on the land. As part of the privately funded development, a quay wall was built facing the river, with a second wall built further inland. The gap between these walls was filled with sand and gravel dredged from the Liffey. The project commenced in 1716, with the initial phase completed by the early 1720s. John Rocque's 1756 map of Dublin shows Rogerson's quay as largely developed by the mid-18th century. During the early 19th century, the quay serviced larger freight vessels, including colliers which brought coal (from ports like Whitehaven in England) to feed the coal and gas works at nearby Hanover Quay. By the 20th century, Sir John Rogerson's Quay was home to a number of shipbuilding and shipping companies, as well as several storehouse types, including cold stores and 'campshire' sheds. At the beginning of the "Lotus-Eaters" episode of James Joyce's Ulysses, set in 1904, Leopold Bloom, one of the novel's protagonists, walks along Rogerson's Quay. Joyce describes it at the time as busy with lorry traffic and notes some of the businesses along it—a linseed crusher, the postal telegraph office, and a sailor's home.

== Modern-day ==
As of the early 21st century, the previously functional maritime buildings and features of Sir John Rogerson's Quay have been redeveloped for heritage tourism, and newer office buildings have been built on the quay. This has included redevelopment of the quay's 'campshire' warehouses (associated with the historical use of the quay as a military 'camp'), and the renovation of a mid-19th century diving bell made by Grendons of Drogheda. The diving bell has been a feature of the quays since the 1870s, and was used to build and maintain many of the walls of Dublin's quays.
