= Campshire =

Industrial warehouse buildings in Dublin, Ireland

The campshires are the stretches of land between the quay and road on both the north and south quays in Dublin. They are so named because various British military regiments, such as the Gloucestershires or Leicestershires, would camp there before setting off or returning from overseas, making 'campshire' a portmanteau of 'camp' and '-shire'.

It is not clear when the word was first used, but it must date to the First World War or earlier. The term appears in a 1957 issue of The Irish Times.

Before the Dublin Port facilities moved down river, this was the area of the Dublin quays where ships were loaded and unloaded. As a result, the area had a number of storage warehouses and travelling cranes. The campshires were renewed and renovated by the now-defunct Dublin Docklands Development Authority between 2000 and 2005, adding walkways and cycleways on both sides of the river Liffey, including parts of the Sutton to Sandycove project. A number of buildings on the campshires were also subject to renovations during the first decade of the 21st century.
