= Freshii =

Canadian fast casual restaurant franchise

- Type: Public
- Industry: Fast casual dining
- Founded: September 2005; 21 years ago (as Lettuce Eatery); Toronto, Ontario, Canada
- Founder: Matthew Corrin
- Headquarters: Toronto, Ontario, Canada
- Products: Burritos; Salads; Wraps; Rice/Noodle Bowls; Soups; Frozen Yogurt
- Parent: Foodtastic Inc. (2023–present)
- Website: freshii.com

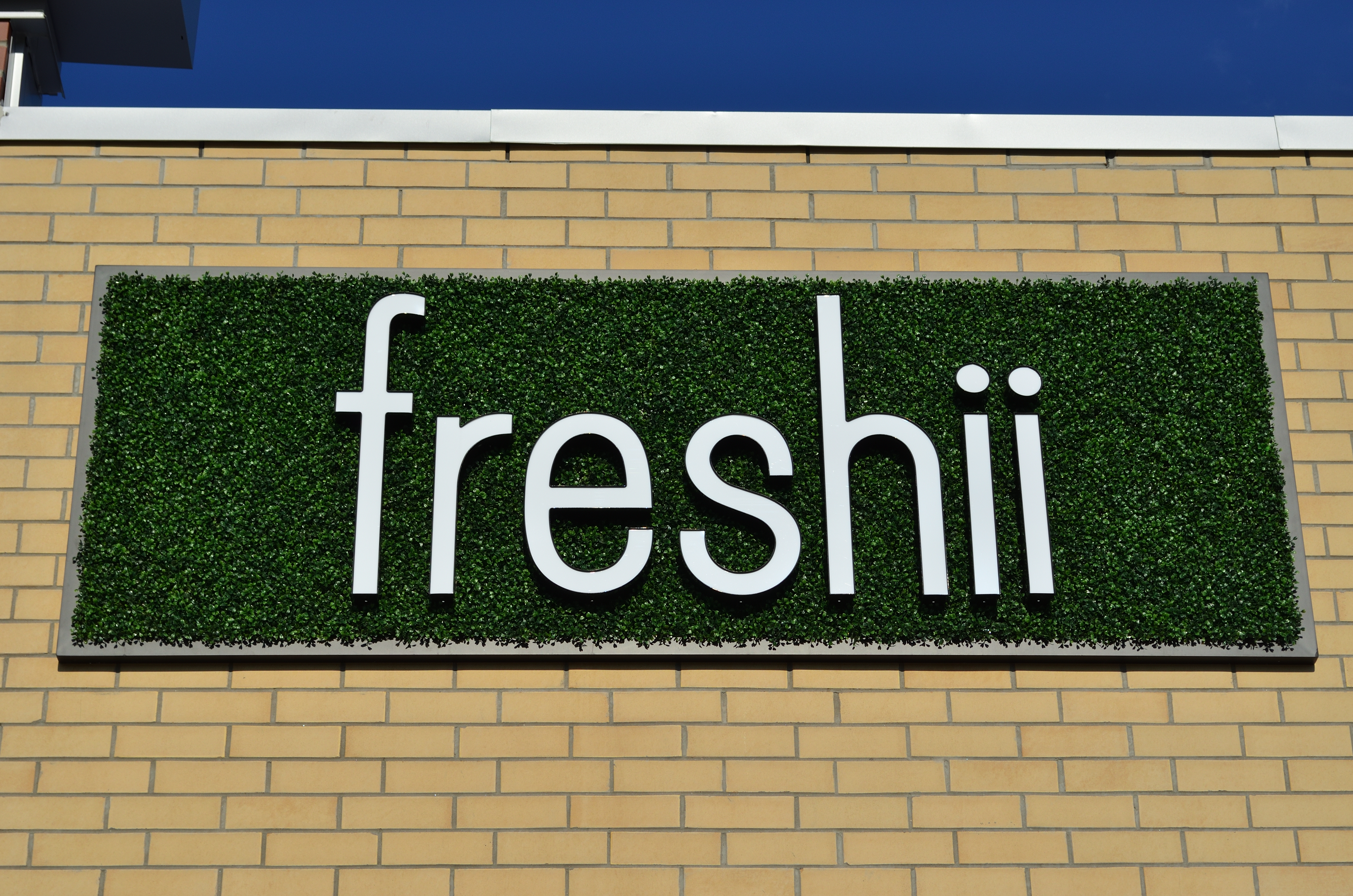
Freshii in Markham, Ontario

Freshii is a Canadian fast casual restaurant franchise that serves burritos, wraps, soups, salads, and frozen yogurt. Founded in 2005 by former CEO Matthew Corrin, it has expanded to over 100 locations in countries such as Canada, the United States, Colombia, Peru, Sweden, Austria, Switzerland, Ireland, and United Arab Emirates, with franchises under development in Germany, Guatemala, and Saudi Arabia.

As of the end of December 2021, the franchise has 343 stores in North America. Freshii does not disclose the number of stores located outside of North America in its financial reports but states that these stores represent a small portion of its overall revenues.

On February 22, 2023, Freshii was sold to Foodtastic for $54.5 million.

== History ==
At the time he founded Freshii in Toronto in 2005, Matthew Corrin was working under fashion designer Oscar de la Renta when he became inspired by New York delis that offered fresh food. Originally called "Lettuce Eatery", the store opened to large queues and ran out of food on the first day before the end of lunch.

In 2016, the company opened an average of 3.5 new stores per week and reached a total of 220 stores in 20 countries. Rapid expansion has also been seen in Latin America, with Colombia serving as the base of operations.

As of 2015, Freshii hopes to open from 13 to 20 restaurants in Chile over the next decade. Restaurants have also been opening in Mexico, Guatemala, Costa Rica and Panama. The Latin American locations all feature the same core menu as Freshii outlets in North America and Europe, but also add several local or domestic ingredients.

In 2017, the CBC reported that Freshii was failing to comply with an Ontario law which required posting calorie counts on chain restaurant menus.

As of 2017, they're also planning on expanding into the UK market, as then Freshii CEO and founder Corrin said in a statement that the United Kingdom is underserved when it comes to healthy fast-casual food offerings and the company believes there is tremendous opportunity to grow the brand in the region.

In 2016, the chain introduced meal boxes at most locations which include breakfast, lunch, dinner, and two snacks. The boxes are available in plans ranging from 1 to 30 days and focus on healthy eating. In February 2019, Freshii announced plans to begin selling their pre-packaged meals inside of Walmart Canada stores.

In April 2022, it was reported that Freshii had begun to trial the outsourcing of cashiers via telework, using video conferencing systems branded as "Percy". The "virtual cashiers" are outsourced to workers in Central American countries such as Nicaragua; the company stated that the system was intended to help address job shortages related to the COVID-19 pandemic.

The Canadian Labour Congress criticized Freshii for exploiting workers in countries with a lower minimum wage compared to Canada's (with its "virtual cashiers" reportedly being paid around US$3.75 per-hour), and eliminating positions that student workers previously took.

In May 2022, Corrin stepped down as CEO of Freshii to focus on Percy, being replaced by Chief Financial Officer Daniel Haroun. On November 10, following the release of its third quarter 2022 financial results, Freshii's stock hit an all-time low of $0.91 CDN per share, representing a decline of over 90% since the stock first started publicly trading in February 2017.

On December 19, 2022, Montreal-based franchisor Foodtastic Inc. signed a deal to buy the company for $74.4 million. On February 22, 2023, Foodtastic completed its acquisition of Freshii at $2.30 per share.

== Philanthropy ==
Freshii is an active supporter of many local organizations where they have operating locations. Freshii was an active supporter of WE Charity and meals were donated to children in need when certain meals were purchased by customers. Following a political scandal and due to the financial impacts of the COVID-19 pandemic, WE Charity announced it was ceasing operations in late 2020.

== See also ==
- List of Canadian restaurant chains
