= MPT =

MPT may refer to:

== Chemistry ==
- Methylpropyltryptamine, a psychedelic tryptamine
- Molybdopterin, a component of molybdenum cofactor
- Tetrahydromethanopterin, the coenzyme H_{4}MPT

== Organizations ==
- Malta Public Transport, the national bus operator of Malta
- Maryland Public Television, the public television broadcaster for Maryland, USA
- Medical Properties Trust, a real estate investment trust that leases healthcare facilities through sale-and-leaseback to hospitals
- Meta Peace Team, formerly Michigan Peace Team, a US-based nonviolent activist organization
- Ministry of Posts and Telecommunications, an agency in several governments
- Myanma Posts and Telecommunications (MPT), a state-owned internet service provider in Myanmar/Burma
- Mormugao Port Trust, a port in Goa, India
- Togolese People's Movement (in French: Mouvement populaire togolais)
- Partido da Terra (MPT, from its former name Movimento Partido da Terra), a Portuguese Green party
- Midpoint (MPT), a currency exchange company.

== Other ==
- Master of Physical Therapy, a post-baccalaureate professional degree conferred upon physical therapists
- Metroid Prime: Trilogy
- Microwave Power Transmission, see Microwave transmission#Microwave power transmission
- Modern portfolio theory, a mathematical framework used in finance
- ModPlug Tracker, tracker software
- Morpeth railway station, England; National Rail station code MPT
- Multistate Performance Test in US bar (law) examination
- Master partition table
- Mid-Pleistocene Transition, a change of glacial periodicity in Quaternary geology
- MKE MPT, Turkish assault rifle
