= International Financial Services Centre, Dublin =

Financial centre in Dublin, Ireland

Coordinates: 53°20′58″N 6°14′50″W

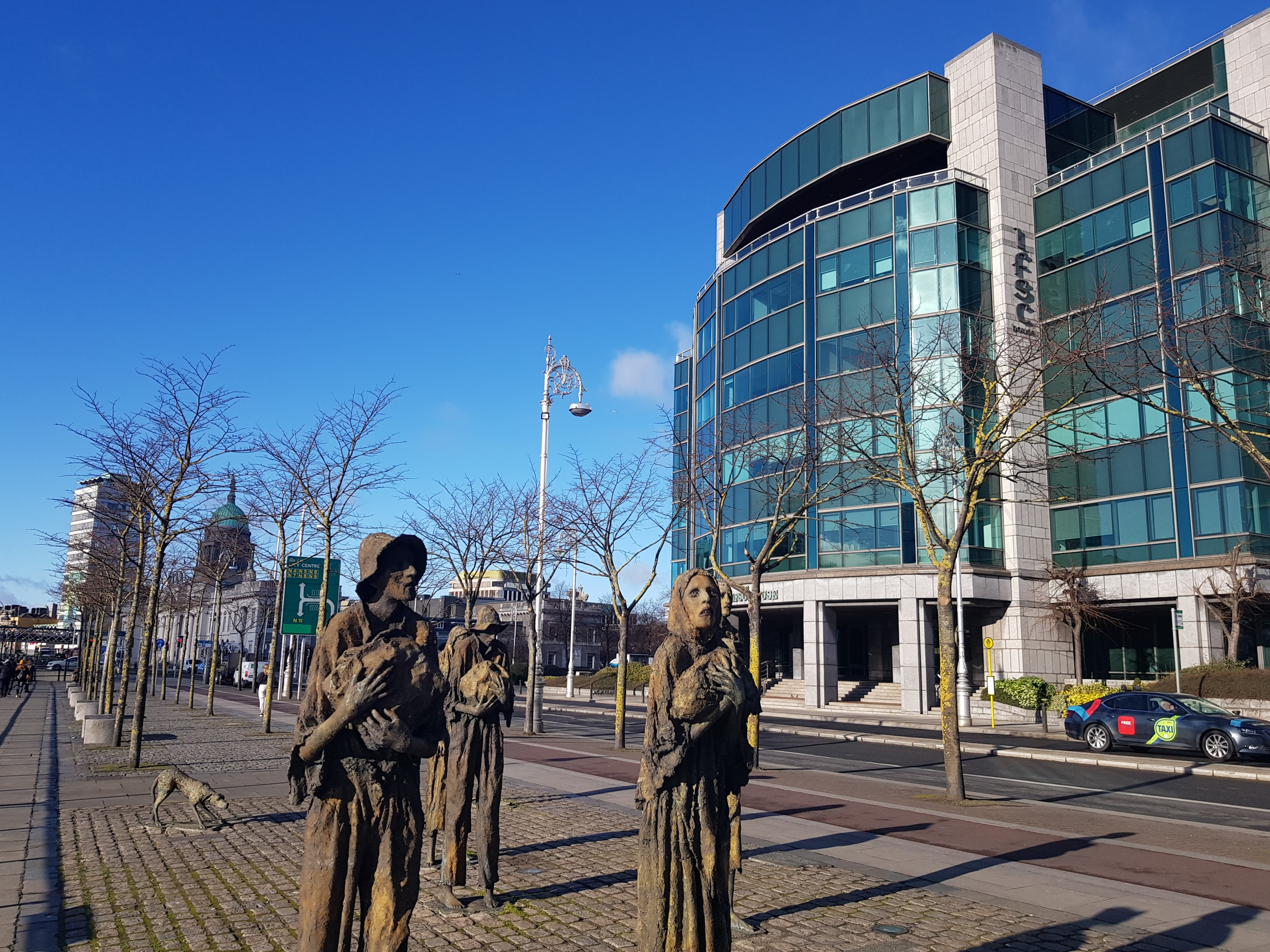
IFSC House - the former offices of AIB (IFSC, Custom House Quay, Dublin 1), 27 January 2022

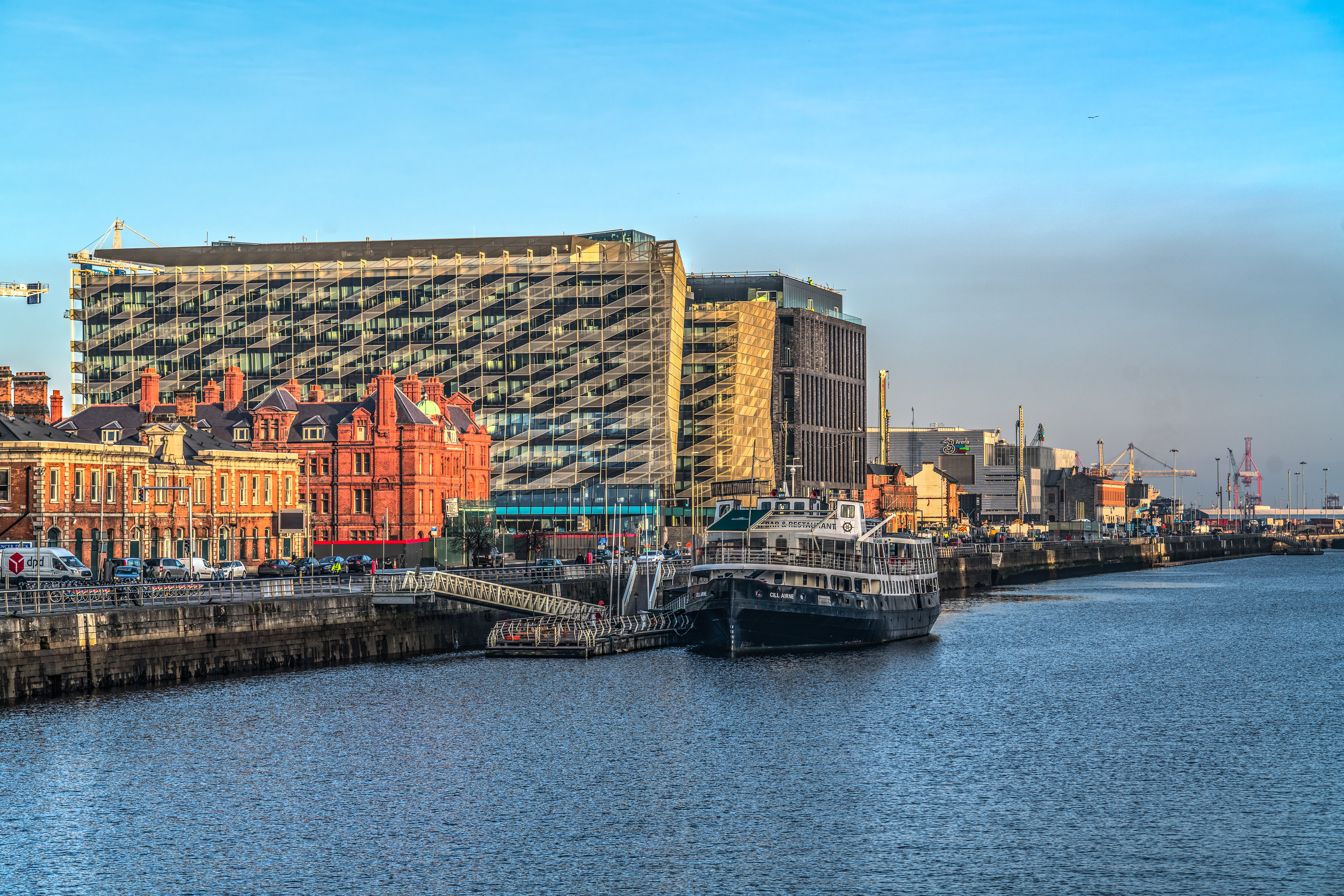
Central Bank of Ireland headquarters with the foundations of Salesforce's new Dublin office and the MV Cill Airne in the foreground (Spencer Dock, North Wall Quay, Dublin 1), 11 January 2018

The International Financial Services Centre (IFSC; Irish: Lárionad Seirbhísí Airgeadais Idirnáisiúnta) is an area of central Dublin and part of the CBD established in the 1980s as an urban regeneration area and special economic zone (SEZ) on the derelict state-owned former port authority lands of the reclaimed North Wall and George's Dock areas of the Dublin Docklands. The term has become a metonym for the Irish financial services industry as well as being used as an address and still being classified as an SEZ.

It officially began in 1987 as an SEZ on an 11-hectare (27-acre) docklands site in central Dublin, with EU approval to apply a 10% corporate tax rate for "designated financial services activities". Before the expiry of this EU approval in 2005, the Irish Government legislated to effectively have a national flat rate by reducing the overall Irish corporate tax rate from 32% to 12.5% which was introduced in 2003.

An additional primary goal of the IFSC was to assist the urban renewal and development programme of the North Wall area as a result of its dereliction following the advent of containerisation in the 1960s. Following a period of successful regeneration the Section 23 Relief and other schemes ceased accepting new entrants from 1999.

The original 11-hectare IFSC site has gone through several expansions to become a 37.8-hectare (93-acre) area by 2018 which is now a major European financial centre. By merging with the Spencer Dock and Grand Canal Dock area, the IFSC is now considered to be an "International Services Centre", covering a broader range than being purely financial. The creation and development of the IFSC is considered to be an important part of Ireland's economic growth story.

== Location ==
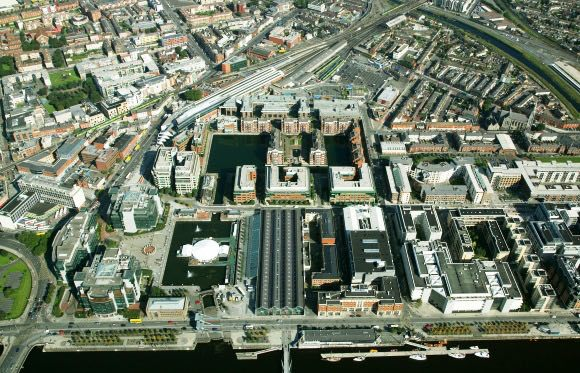
The original 11-hectare IFSC site, 13 September 2008

The original IFSC 1 (development of the 11-hectare (27-acre) site from 1987 to 1997 under the Custom House Docks Development Authority "CHDDA") comprises the area between Memorial Road, Amiens Street, Lower Sheriff Street (including part of Crinan Strand), Guild Street, and the River Liffey along North Wall Quay and Custom House Quay. Adjacent districts include East Wall to the north and Spencer Dock to the east; the Custom House, Busáras and the city centre lie to the west along Store Street and Abbey Street. Within the IFSC, the original development area lies west of Commons Street.

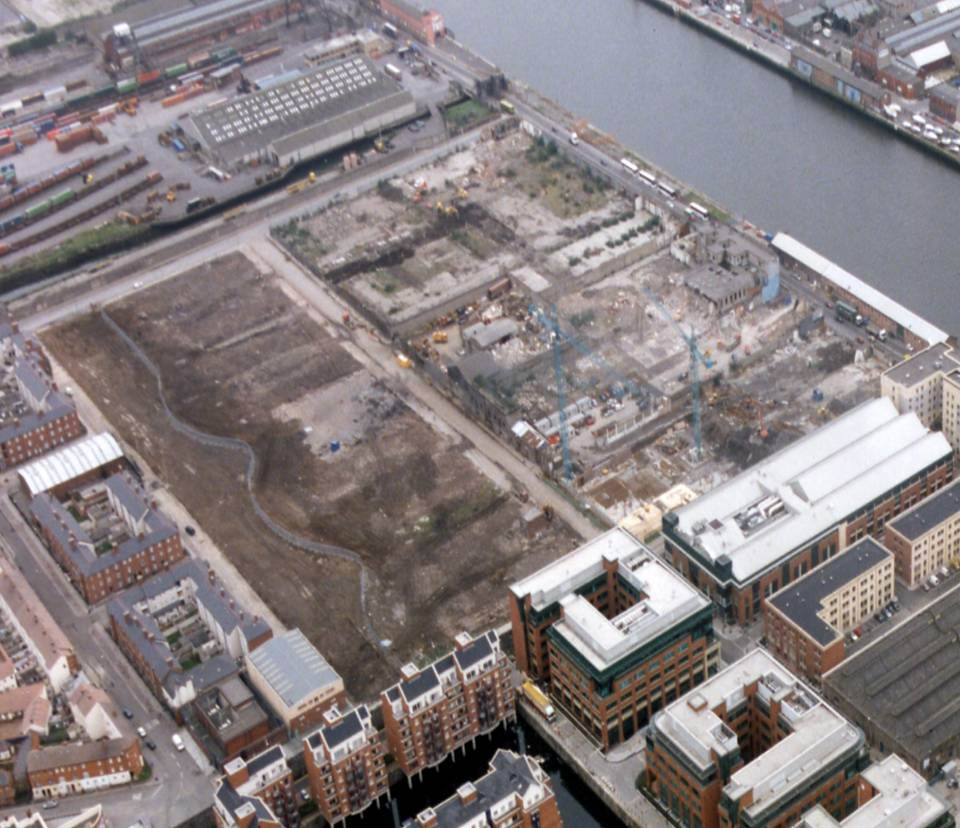
IFSC 4.8-hectare expansion site under construction (January 1998)

East of Commons Street is the later IFSC 2 expansion (development of an additional 4.8 hectares (12 acres) from 1997 to 2007 under the Dublin Docklands Development Authority (DDDA) which runs along North Wall Quay and Lower Mayor Street. It is an integrated development located in the centre of the city which incorporates office accommodation, educational institutions, housing, restaurants and shopping facilities including the Dublin Landings development.

East of Guild Street down as far as the Point Depot is the final part of the IFSC (Docklands Strategic Development Zone, created by Dublin City Council ("DCC") on the dissolution of the DDDA in 2012), as an area containing the Central Bank of Ireland as well the offices of PwC, Credit Suisse and numerous technology companies including Yahoo and WeWork. This was further expanded by DCC in 2015 into a larger special economic zone ("SEZ") to include the full 22 hectares (54 acres) of North Lotts and Grand Canal Docks sites, taking in both financial and technology services companies. Only the area within the North Wall part of the original IFSC includes IFSC as part of a postal address.

== History ==
The concept of a low tax international financial service centre is attributed to Irish businessman Dermot Desmond and politician Ruairi Quinn among others, whose ideas were later picked up by Fianna Fáil leader Charles Haughey and incorporated into his 1987 election manifesto (with contributions from AIB CEO Michael Buckley). Despite resistance from the Department of Finance (concerned about the impact on domestic tax revenues), Haughey overruled and got permission from the EU to create a special 10% tax incentive zone (the IFSC), in the 1987 Finance Act (Section 30).

The CHDDA had earlier been created under the auspices of the Garret FitzGerald lead Fine Gael-Labour minority government as a Special Purpose Agency (SPA) in November 1986. The physical manifestation of the IFSC began with the construction of three offices - The International Centre, IFSC House and La Touche House, all with distinctive green colouring. To operate in the IFSC and access the 10% tax rate, companies had to be approved by the Certification Advisory Committee (CAC), composed of representatives from the Irish Development Authority, the Department of Finance, the Department of Enterprise, Trade and Employment and the Central Bank of Ireland.

The next major event was the Irish Taxes and Consolidated Act, 1997 (TCA) which upgraded the legal and tax structures in the IFSC, and in particular created the " Irish section 110 SPV" and laid the foundations for the Double Irish, Single Malt and the Capital Allowances for Intangible Assets BEPS tools. In addition, the Dublin Docklands Development Authority was set up to oversee the expansion of the IFSC's site (most notable being the reclamation of the Grand Canal Basin site)

The "dual structure" Irish corporate tax rate, came under pressure from the EC (due to competition rules), and it was agreed that it would expire in 2005. In advance of this deadline, the Irish Government in the 1998/1999 Finance Acts introduced a lower 12.5% corporate tax rate for the entire country which was fully introduced from 1 January 2003, and by 1 January 2006, all remaining IFSC companies (some held their old licenses) were on a 12.5% rate. The IFSC ceased to exist as a required legal entity.

The next major event was the Irish financial crisis from 2008 to 2013. The IFSC was a major EU securitisation hub and the effect of billion euro special purpose vehicles (or SPVs) collapsing added to the concern over Ireland's financial position. It did not help that these SPVs (and other IFSC type activities) produced a further distorted picture of Ireland's already precarious National Accounts statistics. The sudden drop in Dublin's ranking on the Global Financial Centres Index ("GFCI") from an all-time high of 10th in March 2009 (GFCI 5), to 23rd by September 2009 (GFCI 6), sparked a formal investigation.

A tightening by the Irish regulator (after a period of loose regulation) which followed the Irish financial crisis led some financial institutions to move operations elsewhere (as well as others who were exited) and caused Dublin's GFCI ranking as a financial services centre to drop further to 70th in 2014 (GFI 16). IFSC institutions cited the timeliness of decisions by the Central Bank of Ireland as having an impact on their operations. Since 2014 however, the IFSC has started to recover, rising to 31 in the 2016 GCFI 21 ranking.

The IFSC Securitisation Sector produced a major domestic scandal when it was revealed in mid-2016 that US Distressed Debt funds (pejoratively called "vulture funds") had been using the Irish Section 110 SPV to avoid all Irish taxes on their Irish domestic investments. The Irish Government closed the "loopholes" but it was estimated that the loss in Irish tax revenues to the Irish exchequer runs to billions of euros (exceeding the value the securitisation sector ever delivered to Ireland). Discussed further in vulture fund Irish tax avoidance.

The IFSC Securitisation Sector was further pressured when it was revealed in 2018 that Russian banks (some under EU and US sanctions) had also been using the Irish Section 110 SPV to funnel over €100bn through the IFSC. Further academic studies showed that the IFSC SPV sector was operating in an almost unregulated fashion where structures were more akin to brass plate companies. Other former Central Bank of Ireland regulators also publicly highlighted their concerns. Discussed further in unregulated shadow banking.

== Financial sectors ==
A 2015 Irish Government IFS 2020 Strategy Paper, lists the Irish financial services sector as comprising over 400 companies, employing over 35,000 people (one third outside Dublin), with over €3.2 trillion in funds under administration, providing €2bn in taxes and €2.3bn in wages and salaries. KMPG estimate the IFSC constitutes 7% of Irish GDP. The IFSC has now become one of Europe's most important centres for § Fund administration and domiciling, and § Securitisation, and ultimately became the birthplace of and global leader in § Aircraft leasing.

Some of the largest offices in the IFSC are those of the major Irish accounting and law firms. They have become associated with the creation and development of international tax management tools, (such as the Double Irish, single malt, and capital allowances for intangible assets (CAIA) BEPS tools; and Section 110 SPV, QIAIF and ICAV zero-tax legal structures), leading to concerns of Ireland as a tax haven. In 2017, a University of Amsterdam study estimated that the IFSC was one of the world's largest conduit OFCs for facilitating global corporate tax avoidance. In 2018, a Gabriel Zucman study estimated that Ireland had become the world's largest corporate tax haven by virtue of its use as a Conduit OFC.

Some of the main sectors of financial services activity carried out in the IFSC are outlined below:

=== Fund administration and domiciling ===
The original proposal for the IFSC was that it would become a location for high-margin activities such as investment management, banking and securities trading given its low tax rate and proximity to the major centres of London and Paris. However, ultimately few of these companies established offices which offered these services or relocated to Dublin in the following years and while the level of material employment has grown significantly relative to its former size, it is still well below many of the larger European financial centres in overall terms such as Frankfurt, London or Paris. Many of the notable fund and investment managers are dealing mostly with domestic businesses e.g. - Irish Life and Bank of Ireland and many of the examples mentioned in the media outlets relate to fund domiciling, custody, treasury and more recently trading rather than investment management and investment banking.

Classic fund administration (i.e. fund accounting, fund administration, fund custody and transfer agency) is the largest employer in IFSC making up almost a third of IFSC jobs and totaling almost 9,274 jobs at the last reliable study. The four largest global fund administration and custody providers all have major offices in the IFSC State Street, BNY Mellon, Citibank and Northern Trust, as well as internal fund administration departments from major global investment banks such as JPMorgan Chase, Goldman Sachs and Bank of America.

Fund domiciling (and distribution) is where specialist law firms, and specialist administration departments of investment firms (i.e. BlackRock, Citibank, Deutsche Bank), provide legal (i.e. creating fund prospectus, fund listing documents etc.) and other professional services (i.e. fund trustees, fund audit etc.) to Irish domiciled, and often Irish listed, fund structures in various Irish legal fund "wrappers" (incl. UCITs, QIAIFs, MMFs and AIFs). The IFSC is one of the largest and fastest growing locations for UCITS in Europe.

The trade body for the IFSC fund administration and domiciling sector is the Irish Funds (Industry) Association (previously Dublin Funds Industry Association, or "DIMA").

=== Securitisation ===
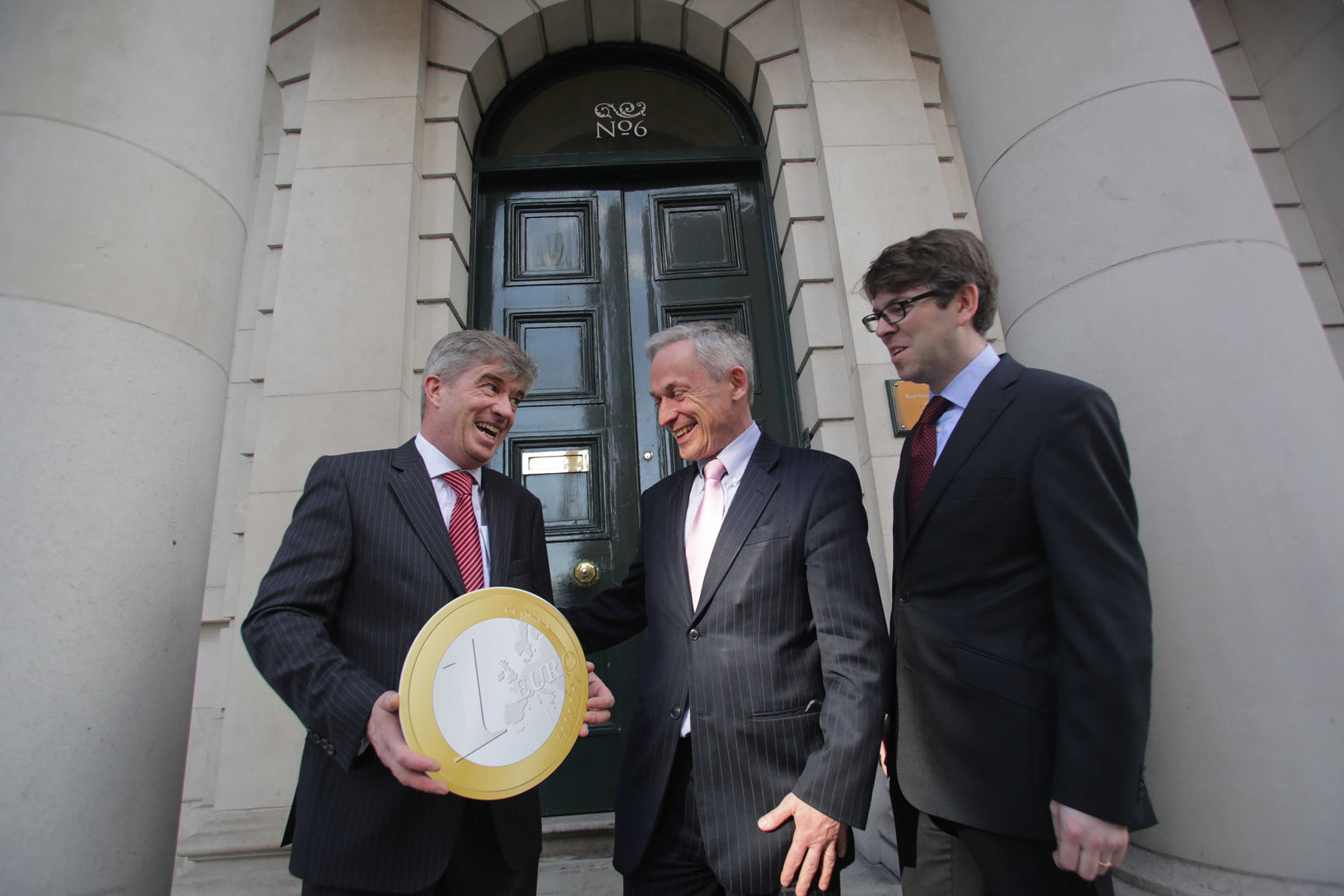
Irish Debt Securities Association (IDSA) launch on 16 April 2013 with Minister Richard Bruton, IDSA CEO Gary Palmer, and IDSA Chairman Turlough Galvin of Matheson's Tax Practice

The introduction of the Irish Section 110 SPV in 1997, described by PwC as the "heart of the Irish structured finance regime", enabled the IFSC become the largest provider of SPVs in the EU securitisation market, and has made Ireland the 4th largest shadow banking centre in the world. While Irish securitisation SPVs pay no effective Irish corporate taxes (SPVs are deliberately structured in this way), they are estimated to contribute over €100m annually to the Irish Economy from fees paid to local Irish professional services firms (legal, accounting and corporate services providers) who create and administer the SPVs. The sector was involved in a major domestic tax scandal in 2017.

Sometimes the securitisation sector is merged with the fund administration sector when "total funds administered" data is quoted for the IFSC (or IFS sector).

The trade body for the IFSC Securitisation sector is the Irish Debt Securities Association (IDSA), which was founded by IFSC law firm, Matheson.

=== Banking ===
Some of the world's largest banks have offices in the IFSC. Their focus is mainly on administration support for securitisation and structured finance activities, aircraft leasing activities, or conducting in-house corporate treasury and fund administration functions for their parent. There are few examples of foreign banks conducting higher margin asset management, investment banking or corporate finance from their IFSC platform (instead usually favouring their bases in London, Paris, Frankfurt or Luxembourg in Europe).

The trade body for the IFSC and non-IFSC banking sector is the Irish Banking Federation.

=== Insurance ===
The main insurance activities cover life insurance, general insurance, reinsurance and captive insurance. There is little insurance risk originated or underwritten in the IFSC and London remains the primary global base for these activities. The only remaining listed Irish insurance company is FBD Holdings which is one of the smaller players in the Irish insurance market. The IFSC occasionally provides an accounting and administration service for products sold on a pan-EU basis through the parent's main channels. The IFSC has a niche strength as a top location in the relatively small Captive Insurance market.

The trade body for the IFSC Insurance sector is the Dublin International Insurance & Management Association (DIMA).

=== Aircraft leasing ===
The IFSC is the largest aircraft leasing hub in the world with 14 of the top 15 aircraft lessors headquartered in Ireland (including AerCap, GECAS, SMBC and Avolon) and circa 50% of the world's fleet of leased aircraft is managed through IFSC companies. Unlike some other IFSC sectors, the Aircraft Leasing sector includes high margin activities such as origination and financing as well as accounting and administration. While the sector employs around 5,000 people (1,700 directly) (versus Fund Administration at almost 10,000 jobs), and pays less than €40m in Irish corporate tax it is estimated to provide over €500m annually to the Irish Economy (from salaries and fees) making it one of the most valuable sectors in the IFSC. In May 2019, figures from the Department of Finance showed that since 2012, the net assets of the aircraft leasing industry in Ireland was close to zero (€141 billion in Irish domiciled aircraft assets offset by €141 billion in offshore financing); and that the aircraft leasing industry paid only €54 million in Irish corporation tax in 2018. The average salary of employees in the aircraft leasing sector is estimate to be in the region of €165,000.

The closest related trade body for the IFSC Aircraft Leasing sector is the Irish Aviation Authority (IAA) (not exclusively IFSC focused). Aircraft Leasing Ireland (ALI) also represents the sector and is a constituent part of Financial Services Ireland (FSI) and ultimately of Ibec.

=== Corporate treasury ===
The corporate treasury sector primarily consists of small IFSC subsidiaries of large non-financial multi-national services organisations (e.g. Pfizer, Xerox), which serve as a hub for in-house treasury functions (i.e. cash pooling, fx hedging), for their global parent and sometimes serving as shared services centres serving multiple locations and functions (providing administration and bookkeeping functions). The level of Irish corporation tax paid by these hubs is close to €200m per annum, making it more valuable to the Irish Economy than the higher-profile IFSC Securitisation sector.

=== Payments processing ===
This sector covers payments companies, such as credit card processing companies Visa and MasterCard, internet and fintech payments companies including PayPal and Stripe, and other payment processors such as Fexco, TransferMate, Realex Payments, and Prepaid Financial Services. Ireland's tax regime for contract manufacturing, previously developed for its pharmaceutical sector, makes the country a low-tax or zero-tax location for processing payments.

The closest trade body for the IFSC Payments sector is the Fintech Payments Association of Ireland (FPAI) (not exclusively IFSC focused).

=== Private equity and venture capital ===
Private equity and private credit firms with offices and investment professionals in Ireland are mainly operated and funded by large American private equity organisations such as KKR, Carlyle Group and Oaktree Capital Management. Additionally, investments and acquisitions are also made by non-domestic firms such as Brookfield Asset Management's €120M takeover of Imagine Communications, Insight Partner's purchase of a €100m stake in the AMCS Group (in conjunction with the ISIF) and Apollo's takeover of Ireland's largest hotel chain Tifco in a €600m deal in 2018.

Domestic private equity firms include Renatus and most notably Causeway Capital who were responsible for the rescue of Patisserie Valerie in February 2019.

The trade body for the private equity and venture capital industry is the Irish Venture Capital Association (IVCA).

== Technology expansion ==
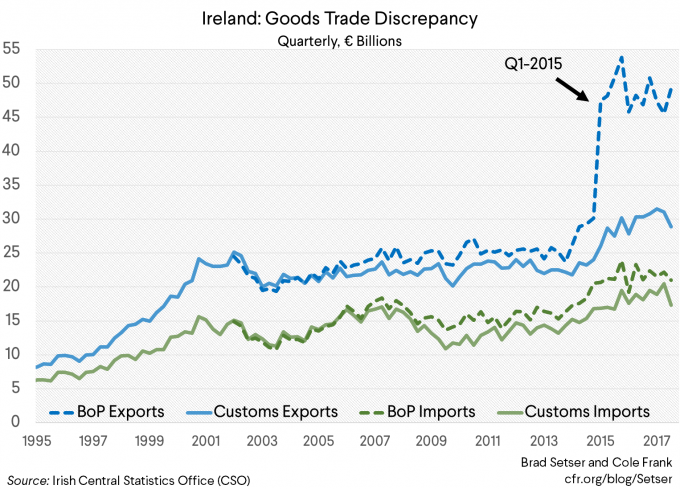
Apple's Q1 2015 Irish restructuring (leprechaun economics) is the largest BEPS action in history, and led to the replacement of GDP by GNI*. Brad Setser & Cole Frank (CoFR).

The 2015 IFSC III phase saw the "financial" IFSC merge with the neighbouring Grand Canal Dock and Dublin Docklands areas; comprising major offices of global technology multinationals including Google, Facebook, and Amazon. Since the 2015 expansion, the term "International Services Centre" (ISC) is sometimes used.

Some of the biggest offices in the IFSC are the law firms (e.g. Matheson, A&L Goodbody, McCann Fitzgerald, and William Fry), and accounting firms (e.g. PwC, KPMG, Deloitte, and EY), who advise both the financial multinationals and technology multinationals, operating in the Greater Dublin Area.

The legal structures created by IFSC law and accounting firms for securitization (e.g. Section 110 SPVs, and QIAIFs), became important to the tax structuring of US technology firms in the IFSC. Such structures are part of a suite of base erosion and profit shifting (BEPS) tools that enable US technology firms to achieve an effective tax rate (ETR) of under 4% on all non-US global profits shifted to Ireland (see here). PwC Ireland managing partner, Feargal O'Rourke, was credited as creating the Double Irish BEPS tool, while Matheson have also been identified an important developer of US tax structures in Ireland.

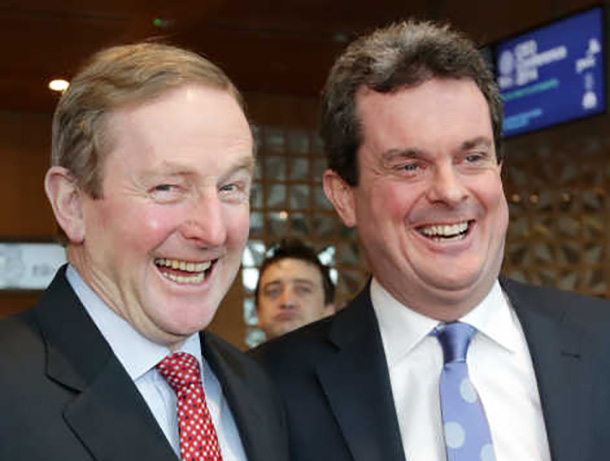
Former Taoiseach Enda Kenny (l) and PwC (Irl.) partner Feargal O'Rourke (r), 1 October 2014

With the closure of the Double Irish arrangement in 2020, the most important BEPS tool in the IFSC is the Capital Allowances for Intangible Assets (CAIA) BEPS tool. Apple used the CAIA BEPS tool in Q1 2015 to execute the largest BEPS action in history, causing the Leprechaun economics revision of Irish GDP data.

IFSC tax law firms market the sub–2.5% Irish effective tax rates that the CAIA BEPS tool can deliver for technology multinationals in the IFSC, on all their worldwide income that is shifted to Ireland. In 2018, the European Parliament GUE/NGL group called the CAIA tool, the "Green Jersey" BEPS tool.

The CAIA BEPS tool requires multinationals to create virtual internal intellectual property (IP) assets in offshore locations (e.g. Apple used Jersey). These virtual IP assets are purchased, via intergroup loans, by the Irish subsidiary. The CAIA tool allows the Irish subsidiary to write-off this intergroup purchase against future Irish taxes. An accounting firm is needed to stand over the "valuation" of the virtual group IP asset in the multinational's GAAP accounts.

"It is hard to imagine any business, under the current [Irish] IP regime, which could not generate substantial intangible assets under Irish GAAP that would be eligible for relief under [the Irish] capital allowances [for intangible assets scheme]." "This puts the attractive 2.5% Irish IP-tax rate within reach of almost any global business that relocates to Ireland."

— KPMG, "Intellectual Property Tax", 4 December 2017

== Global ranking ==
=== GFCI ranking (2007–2019) ===
The IFSC, classed as "Dublin", appears in the Global Financial Centres Index (GFCI), a ranking of the competitiveness of over 100 global financial centres based on over 29,000 financial centre assessments from an online questionnaire together with over 100 indices from organisations such as the World Bank, the Organisation for Economic Co-operation and Development (OECD), and the Economist Intelligence Unit. The index was started in 2007 and is published twice a year; the IFSC (or Dublin) reached a high of ninth in GFCI6, and a low of 73rd in GFCI16.

Global Financial Centres Index ranking (2007–2019) (Note: The "GFCI 25 Rank vs Rating Over Time" database does not give the "Total Cities" in each GFCI survey; that is provided separately from individual surveys.)
| GFCI Survey | GFCI Survey Date | Dublin Ranking | Total Cities | Dublin Score |
|---|---|---|---|---|
| GFCI1 | March 2007 | 21 | | 578 |
| GFCI2 | September 2007 | 15 | | 605 |
| GFCI3 | March 2008 | 13 | | 613 |
| GFCI4 | September 2008 | 13 | | 613 |
| GFCI5 | March 2009 | 13 | | 622 |
| GFCI6 | September 2009 | 9 | | 618 |
| GFCI7 | March 2010 | 31 | | 612 |
| GFCI8 | September 2010 | 29 | | 605 |
| GFCI9 | March 2011 | 33 | | 592 |
| GFCI10 | September 2011 | 43 | | 614 |
| GFCI11 | March 2012 | 46 | | 621 |
| GFCI12 | September 2012 | 49 | | 618 |
| GFCI13 | March 2013 | 56 | | 627 |
| GFCI14 | September 2013 | 56 | 80 | 605 |
| GFCI15 | March 2014 | 66 | 83 | 616 |
| GFCI16 | September 2014 | 73 | | 607 |
| GFCI17 | March 2015 | 54 | | 627 |
| GFCI18 | September 2015 | 48 | 84 | 654 |
| GFCI19 | March 2016 | 40 | 86 | 643 |
| GFCI20 | September 2016 | 31 | 87 | 663 |
| GFCI21 | March 2017 | 33 | 88 | 663 |
| GFCI22 | September 2017 | 30 | 92 | 672 |
| GFCI23 | March 2018 | 31 | 96 | 666 |
| GFCI24 | September 2018 | 37 | 100 | 652 |
| GFCI25 | March 2019 | 38 | 102 | 658 |
| GFCI26 | September 2019 | 38 | 114 | 674 |

=== Xinhua–Dow Jones Index (2010–2014) ===
The Xinhua–Dow Jones International Financial Centers Development Index (IFCD) was a ranking of circa 45 major global financial centres, and was compiled annually by the Xinhua News Agency of China with the Chicago Mercantile Exchange and Dow Jones & Company of the United States from 2010 to 2014; the IFSC (or Dublin) ranked 37th overall of 45 centres in the final 2014 IFCD Index.

== Tax haven concerns ==
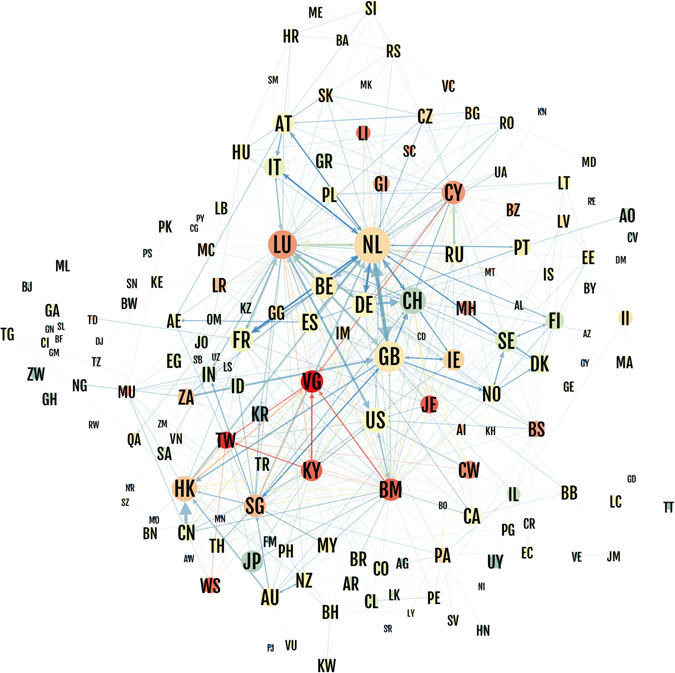
A 2017 study in Nature showed the IFSC was one of the world's largest Global Conduit OFCs, in facilitating corporate tax avoidance.

IFSC growth is closely related to concern regarding tax issues, and Ireland as a tax haven, estimated in 2018 by academics to be the world's largest tax haven. The role that the major IFSC accounting and IFSC law firms have played in creating Irish tax haven-type legal structures, including Double Irish, Single malt, and Capital allowances for intangible assets (CAIA) BEPS tools, as well as Section 110 SPV, QIAIF and ICAV zero-tax legal structures, has been chronicled.

For example, PwC Ireland, one of the largest professional services firms in the IFSC, was identified in 2013 by Bloomberg as the "great architect" of the Double Irish arrangement, the largest known legal tax avoidance structure in history, responsible shielding over US$100 billion annually from taxation.

In addition, Matheson, who state that they have the largest corporate tax group of all IFSC law firms, was identified in 2013 by the Wall Street Journal as the headquarters of 125 major US multi-nationals seeking to benefit from the Irish tax system, and avoid US corporate taxes.

The IFSC's reputation as a global centre of tax haven activities, has seen several of the "offshore magic circle" law firms set up in offices in the IFSC.

IFSC firms have also been associated with helping foreign firms avoid Irish taxes on Irish assets. In 2016, it was discovered US distressed debt funds used IFSC Section 110 securitization vehicles to avoid Irish taxes on their Irish investments (see vulture fund Irish tax avoidance), supported by IFSC law and accounting firms, It was estimated these US distressed funds would avoid €20 billion in Irish taxes from 2016 to 2026 on circa €40 billion of Irish investments made from 2012 to 2016 (which represented circa €80 billion in headline Irish loan balances). Matheson was exposed as using children's charities to hide their client's Section 110 SPVs.

The IFSC's growth has led to Ireland's rise in global league tables of tax havens, and seen Ireland "black listed" by countries such as Brazil.

There is evidence IFSC SPVs are used for circumvention of global sanctions, tax avoidance, and money laundering.

Research in 2017–2018 by Trinity College Dublin finance Professor Jim Stewart, and Cillian Doyle, showed many IFSC SPVs are unregulated brass plate structures attracting little oversight by the Revenue Commissioners or Central Bank of Ireland, and with local individuals holding hundreds of SPV directorships. The International Monetary Fund ("IMF") has noted the same concern regarding governance of IFSC SPVs (and FCVs). In 2018, a former Deputy Governor of the Central Bank of Ireland stated that the risks from abuses of IFSC SPVs was not fully appreciated by the Irish Government.

== Notable IFSC corporate offices ==
Fund Administration and Custodial Services

- State Street Corporation
- BNY Mellon
- Citibank
- Northern Trust
- Bank of America
- JPMorgan Chase
- US Bancorp

Banking & Insurance

- HSBC
- AIG
- BNP Paribas
- Wells Fargo

Investment Banking

- Davy Group
- Goodbody Stockbrokers
- Cantor Fitzgerald

Aviation and Aircraft Leasing

- AerCap
- Avolon
- GECAS
- SMBC Aviation Capital
- Irelandia Investments - (developer of low cost carriers including Ryanair, Tiger Airways and VivaColombia

Trading

- Citadel LLC
- Susquehanna International Group
- Credit Suisse
- Investment Technology Group (Acquired by Virtu Financial)
- Ion Trading Group (Fidessa, Dealogic and Acuris)
- Corvil (acquired by Pico)
- Geneva Trading

Fintech and Regtech

- First Derivatives
- Fenergo
- TransferMate - part of the Taxback Group
- Fexco incorporating a majority shareholding in Goodbody Stockbrokers
- CurrencyFair
- Stripe

Managed Futures

- Abbey Capital

Family Offices

- Elkstone Capital - various HNWI
- Island Capital - Denis O'Brien family office
- International Investment & Underwriting (IIU) - Dermot Desmond family office

Private Credit

- Guggenheim Partners
- Blackstone (GSO Capital Partners) - acquired Harbourmaster Capital Partners
- GoldenTree Asset Management
- Atlantic Capital Management
- Bain Capital

Private Equity

- KKR (formerly Avoca Capital)
- Renatus
- Carlyle Cardinal Ireland (CCI)
- Causeway Capital
- Lioncourt

Venture Capital

- Draper Espirit

Supermancos - in order of AUM(€bn)

- Carne Global Fund Managers
- Northern Trust Fund Services
- Goodbody Stockbrokers Fund Management
- Link Fund Manager Solutions
- Davy Group Investment Fund Services
- DMS Investment Management Services
- KBA Consulting
- MPMF Fund Management (part of the Maples Group)

== See also ==
- List of companies listed on Euronext Dublin
- Offshore financial centre
- Dublin Docklands
