= Tie Break Tens =

Tennis format

Tie Break Tens is the first short tennis format to be officially recognised by the International Tennis Federation (ITF) in which only tie-break matches are played. There are no games or sets, only tie-break matches and the winner is the first player to reach 10 points and lead by a margin of two. Most other traditional rules of tennis are the same. The winner-take-all prize money is usually US$250,000 for each tournament which also support a charity partner. It is a short-format version of tennis, similar to other alternative forms of traditional sports, such as T20 Cricket and rugby sevens.

The inaugural Tie Break Tens tournament took place at the Royal Albert Hall on 5 December 2015. It was won by Kyle Edmund who beat Andy Murray in the finals.

== Rules ==
Officially recognized by the ITF in September of 2025, Tie Break Tens is played using traditional tie-break rules. Players win by reaching 10 points (provided that they have a clear margin of two points). Rock-paper-scissors determines who serves first, and from which end of the court they play. The player who wins the toss, serves first. The other player then serves twice, and with the rest of the match continues with the players alternating serves every two points. Players change ends after every six points. Players are allowed an unlimited number of line-call challenges using review technology during each match, until an incorrect challenge is made. After this, no more challenges are allowed until the next match.

=== Format ===
A knock-out format is used, with quarterfinals, semifinals and final.

== 2015: London ==
The inaugural Tie Break Tens tournament took place on 5 December 2015 at the Royal Albert Hall in London. A round-robin format was used, with six players divided into two groups of three. It was staged in partnership with Champions Tennis and promoted by IMG with a winner-take-all prize of $250,000. Andy Murray, John McEnroe, Tim Henman, David Ferrer, Kyle Edmund and Champions Tennis qualifier Xavier Malisse participated in the competition. In the final, Edmund defeated Andy Murray 10-7 and took away the $250,000 prize, more than doubling his earnings for 2015.

=== Men's singles ===
	Group 1	(United Kingdom) Henman	(United States) McEnroe	(Belgium) Malisse	Match W–L	Point W–L	Differential	Standings
	(United Kingdom) Tim Henman		10–7	5–10	1–1	15–17	-2	2
	(United States) John McEnroe	7–10		7–10	0–2	14–20	-6	3
Q	(Belgium) Xavier Malisse	10–5	10–7		2–0	20–12	+8	1

Group 2	(United Kingdom) Murray	(Spain) Ferrer	(United Kingdom) Edmund	Match W–L	Point W–L	Differential	Standings
(United Kingdom) Andy Murray		10–4	10–7	2–0	20–11	+9	1
(Spain) David Ferrer	4–10		3–10	0–2	7–20	-13	3
(United Kingdom) Kyle Edmund	7–10	10–3		1–1	17–13	+4	2

Semifinals
Q	(Belgium) Xavier Malisse	4
(United Kingdom) Kyle Edmund	10
(United Kingdom) Andy Murray	10
(United Kingdom) Tim Henman	1

Final
(United Kingdom) Kyle Edmund	10
(United Kingdom) Andy Murray	7

Source: Tie Break Tens

== 2016: Vienna ==
Tie Break Tens took place on 23 October 2016, the opening weekend of the Erste Bank Open 500 in Vienna. Andy Murray, Jo Wilfried Tsonga, Dominic Thiem, Tommy Haas, Goran Ivanišević and Marcus Willis competed. It also was competed as a round-robin. Dominic Thiem won, defeating Andy Murray 10–5 in the Final.

=== Men's singles ===
Group A	(Austria) Thiem	(France) Tsonga	(Germany) Haas	Match W–L	Point W–L	Differential	Standings
(Austria) Dominic Thiem		10–4	10–3	2–0	20–7	+13	1
(France) Jo-Wilfried Tsonga	4–10		10–6	1–1	14–16	-2	2
(Germany) Tommy Haas	3–10	6–10		0–2	9–20	-11	3

Group B	(United Kingdom) Murray	(United Kingdom) Willis	(Croatia) Ivanišević	Match W–L	Point W–L	Differential	Standings
(United Kingdom) Andy Murray		10–3	10–7	2–0	20–10	+10	1
(United Kingdom) Marcus Willis	3–10		8–10	0–2	11–20	-9	3
(Croatia) Goran Ivanišević	7–10	10–8		1–1	17–18	-1	2

Semifinals
(Austria) Dominic Thiem	10
(Croatia) Goran Ivanišević	5
(United Kingdom) Andy Murray	10
(France) Jo-Wilfried Tsonga	7

Final
(Austria) Dominic Thiem	10
(United Kingdom) Andy Murray	5
Third place match
(Croatia) Goran Ivanišević	8
(France) Jo-Wilfried Tsonga	10

Source: Tie Break Tens

== 2017: Madrid ==
Tie Break Tens Tens took place at the Caja Mágica in Madrid on 4 May 2017. It featured both men's and women's tournaments for the first time. Grigor Dimitrov won the men's title with Simona Halep taking the women's title. The knock-out format debuted here and has been used ever since.

=== Men's singles ===
Stan Wawrinka, Grigor Dimitrov, Lucas Pouille, Feliciano López, Dan Evans, Tomáš Berdych, Jack Sock and Fernando Verdasco competed in the men's tournament. Dimitrov defeated Lopez in the final.

Quarterfinals
(Bulgaria) Grigor Dimitrov	14
(United Kingdom) Dan Evans	12
(France) Lucas Pouille	6
(Spain) Fernando Verdasco	10
(Czech Republic) Tomáš Berdych	12
(United States) Jack Sock	10
(Switzerland) Stan Wawrinka	1
(Spain) Feliciano López	10

Semifinals
(Bulgaria) Grigor Dimitrov	10
(Spain) Fernando Verdasco	8
(Czech Republic) Tomáš Berdych	8
(Spain) Feliciano López	10

Final
(Bulgaria) Grigor Dimitrov	10
(Spain) Feliciano López	7

Source: Tie Break Tens

=== Women's singles ===
Maria Sharapova, Garbiñe Muguruza, Agnieszka Radwańska, Johanna Konta, Simona Halep, Madison Keys, Svetlana Kuznetsova and Monica Puig played in the women's competition with Halep defeating Kuznetsova in the final.

Quarterfinals
(United States) Madison Keys	10
(Russia) Svetlana Kuznetsova	12
(Poland) Agnieszka Radwańska	10
(Spain) Garbiñe Muguruza	5
(United Kingdom) Johanna Konta	2
(Romania) Simona Halep	10
(Puerto Rico) Monica Puig	10
(Russia) Maria Sharapova	6

Semifinals
(Russia) Svetlana Kuznetsova	10
(Poland) Agnieszka Radwańska	6
(Romania) Simona Halep	10
(Puerto Rico) Monica Puig	5

Final
(Russia) Svetlana Kuznetsova	6
(Romania) Simona Halep	10

Source: Tie Break Tens

== 2018: Melbourne ==
The first Tie Break Tens competition of 2018 was played on 10 January at the Margaret Court Arena in Melbourne, Australia. It featured an 8-player men's singles tournament.

=== Men's singles ===
Initially, 5 of the 8 players were confirmed: Novak Djokovic, Nick Kyrgios, Rafael Nadal, Stan Wawrinka (withdrew, replaced by Milos Raonic) and former tennis player Lleyton Hewitt. Later, Dominic Thiem, Tomáš Berdych and Lucas Pouille also announced their participation, thus completing the field. Tomáš Berdych won the $250,000 prize defeating Nadal in the final 10–5.

Quarterfinals
(Australia) Lleyton Hewitt	10
(Serbia) Novak Djokovic	6
(France) Lucas Pouille	1
(Spain) Rafael Nadal	10
(Czech Republic) Tomáš Berdych	10
(Australia) Nick Kyrgios	8
(Canada) Milos Raonic	10
(Austria) Dominic Thiem	7

Semifinals
(Australia) Lleyton Hewitt	11
(Spain) Rafael Nadal	13
(Czech Republic) Tomáš Berdych	11
(Canada) Milos Raonic	9

Final
(Spain) Rafael Nadal	5
(Czech Republic) Tomáš Berdych	10

Source: Tie Break Tens

== 2018: New York ==
The women's only tournament was played on 5 March 2018 in New York City at Madison Square Garden. This was the first time the competition had been staged in the United States.

=== Women's singles ===
It featured an 8-player woman's singles tournament including Serena Williams, Venus Williams, CoCo Vandeweghe, Daniela Hantuchová, Elina Svitolina, Marion Bartoli, Shuai Zhang and Sorana Cîrstea.

It marked the return of Serena Williams playing her first singles competition since giving birth to her daughter.

Svitolina from Ukraine won the $250 000 winner-takes-all prize defeating Zhang in the final 10–3.

Quarterfinals
(United States) CoCo Vandeweghe	10
(Slovakia) Daniela Hantuchová	7
(United States) Venus Williams	3
(Ukraine) Elina Svitolina	10
(France) Marion Bartoli	5
(United States) Serena Williams	10
(Romania) Sorana Cîrstea	4
(China) Zhang Shuai	10

Semifinals
(United States) CoCo Vandeweghe	0
(Ukraine) Elina Svitolina	10
(United States) Serena Williams	11
(China) Zhang Shuai	13

Final
(Ukraine) Elina Svitolina	10
(China) Zhang Shuai	3

== 2019: Indian Wells ==
The men's singles tournament was played on 5 March 2019 at Indian Wells Tennis Garden. This was their first competition at Indian Wells.

=== Men's singles ===
It was an 8-player men's singles tournament including Dominic Thiem, Stan Wawrinka, Gaël Monfils, Milos Raonic, Taylor Fritz, Rafael Nadal, Marin Čilić and David Goffin. The tournament was played in Stadium 2 at the Indian Wells Tennis Garden, in front of 8,000 people.

Raonic won the $150,000 prize by defeating Wawrinka 10–6 in the final.

Quarterfinals
(Croatia) Marin Čilić	11
(Belgium) David Goffin	9
(Canada) Milos Raonic	10
(France) Gaël Monfils	7
(Austria) Dominic Thiem	5
(Switzerland) Stan Wawrinka	10
(United States) Taylor Fritz	8
(Spain) Rafael Nadal	10

Semifinals
(Croatia) Marin Čilić	3
(Canada) Milos Raonic	10
(Switzerland) Stan Wawrinka	13
(Spain) Rafael Nadal	11

Final
(Canada) Milos Raonic	10
(Switzerland) Stan Wawrinka	6

== 2021: Dubai ==
=== Men's singles ===
A men's singles tournament was played in Dubai on 22 October 2021 with AED 500,000 winner take all prize money at the Coca-Cola Arena. The 8 players were Gaël Monfils, Dan Evans, Taylor Fritz, Ramkumar Ramanathan, Zizou Bergs, Dustin Brown, Simon Roberts and Benjamin Hassan.

The winner of the tournament was Zizou Bergs from Belgium, who overcame Taylor Fitz after saving a championship point, 11–9.

Quarterfinals
(France) Gaël Monfils	11
(Germany) Benjamin Hassan	9
(Belgium) Zizou Bergs	10
(Germany) Dustin Brown	6
(United States) Taylor Fritz	10
(United Kingdom) Simon Roberts	3
(India) Ramkumar Ramanathan	7
(United Kingdom) Dan Evans	10

Semifinals
(France) Gaël Monfils	9
(Belgium) Zizou Bergs	11
(United States) Taylor Fritz	10
(United Kingdom) Dan Evans	7

Final
(Belgium) Zizou Bergs	11
(United States) Taylor Fritz	9

== 2022: Indian Wells ==
=== Women's singles ===
The 2022 tournament was organized as a women's singles event and was played on 8 March 2022 in honor of International Women's Day. The event was held at the Indian Wells Tennis Garden for the second time, ahead of the 2022 Indian Wells Masters. The eight-player field originally included Paula Badosa, Leylah Fernandez, Simona Halep, Ons Jabeur, Barbora Krejčíková, Naomi Osaka, Aryna Sabalenka, and Maria Sakkari. Amanda Anisimova later replaced Krejčíková after she withdrew following an elbow injury. Anisimova won the event and claimed US$150,000 in prize money.

Quarterfinals
(Romania) Simona Halep	7
Aryna Sabalenka	10
(Tunisia) Ons Jabeur	6
(Greece) Maria Sakkari	10
(Canada) Leylah Fernandez	3
(Spain) Paula Badosa	10
(United States) Amanda Anisimova	10
(Japan) Naomi Osaka	3

Semifinals
Aryna Sabalenka	5
(Greece) Maria Sakkari	10
(Spain) Paula Badosa	6
(United States) Amanda Anisimova	10

Final
(Greece) Maria Sakkari	7
(United States) Amanda Anisimova	10

== 2023: Indian Wells ==
=== Mixed doubles ===
The 2023 tournament was organized as the event's first mixed doubles tournament and was played on 7 March 2023. It was held at the Indian Wells Tennis Garden, ahead of the 2023 Indian Wells Open. Emma Raducanu was scheduled to play with Cameron Norrie but withdrew before the tournament. The eight-team field included:

1. Aryna Sabalenka / (United States) Taylor Fritz (champions)
2. (Poland) Iga Świątek / (Poland) Hubert Hurkacz (final)
3. (Spain) Paula Badosa / (United Kingdom) Cameron Norrie (quarterfinals)
4. (Canada) Leylah Fernandez / (Canada) Félix Auger-Aliassime (quarterfinals)
5. (Tunisia) Ons Jabeur / (Norway) Casper Ruud (semifinals)
6. (United States) Jessica Pegula / (United States) Tommy Paul (quarterfinals)
7. (Greece) Maria Sakkari / (Greece) Stefanos Tsitsipas (semifinals)
8. (Switzerland) Belinda Bencic / (Switzerland) Stan Wawrinka (quarterfinals)

Quarterfinals
(Greece) Maria Sakkari (Greece) Stefanos Tsitsipas	12
(Spain) Paula Badosa (United Kingdom) Cameron Norrie	10
(Canada) Leylah Fernandez (Canada) Félix Auger-Aliassime	6
(Poland) Iga Świątek (Poland) Hubert Hurkacz	10
(Tunisia) Ons Jabeur (Norway) Casper Ruud	10
(United States) Jessica Pegula (United States) Tommy Paul	5
Aryna Sabalenka (United States) Taylor Fritz	10
(Switzerland) Belinda Bencic (Switzerland) Stan Wawrinka	4

Semifinals
(Greece) Maria Sakkari (Greece) Stefanos Tsitsipas	7
(Poland) Iga Świątek (Poland) Hubert Hurkacz	10
(Tunisia) Ons Jabeur (Norway) Casper Ruud	8
Aryna Sabalenka (United States) Taylor Fritz	10

Final
(Poland) Iga Świątek (Poland) Hubert Hurkacz	8
Aryna Sabalenka (United States) Taylor Fritz	10

== 2024: Indian Wells ==
=== Mixed doubles ===
The 2024 tournament was organized as the event's second mixed doubles tournament and was played on 5 March 2024. It was held at the Indian Wells Tennis Garden for a third consecutive year, ahead of the 2024 Indian Wells Open.

Before the tournament, Jessica Pegula was partnered with Tommy Paul and Elena Rybakina was partnered with Andrey Rublev; both Pegula and Rybakina withdrew and were replaced by Sloane Stephens and Maria Sakkari, respectively. The eight-team field included:

1. Aryna Sabalenka / (United States) Taylor Fritz (quarterfinals)
2. (Poland) Iga Świątek / (Poland) Hubert Hurkacz (quarterfinals)
3. (Spain) Paula Badosa / (Greece) Stefanos Tsitsipas (final)
4. (Denmark) Caroline Wozniacki / (Denmark) Holger Rune (semifinals)
5. (Greece) Maria Sakkari / Andrey Rublev (quarterfinals)
6. (United States) Sloane Stephens / (United States) Tommy Paul (quarterfinals)
7. (China) Zheng Qinwen / (United States) Frances Tiafoe (semifinals)
8. (United States) Emma Navarro / (United States) Ben Shelton (champions)

Quarterfinals
(Greece) Maria Sakkari; Andrey Rublev	9
(United States) Emma Navarro (United States) Ben Shelton	11
Aryna Sabalenka (United States) Taylor Fritz	7
(Denmark) Caroline Wozniacki (Denmark) Holger Rune	10
(United States) Sloane Stephens (United States) Tommy Paul	8
(China) Zheng Qinwen (United States) Frances Tiafoe	10
(Poland) Iga Świątek (Poland) Hubert Hurkacz	2
(Spain) Paula Badosa (Greece) Stefanos Tsitsipas	10

Semifinals
(United States) Emma Navarro (United States) Ben Shelton	10
(Denmark) Caroline Wozniacki (Denmark) Holger Rune	5
(China) Zheng Qinwen (United States) Frances Tiafoe	3
(Spain) Paula Badosa (Greece) Stefanos Tsitsipas	10

Final
(United States) Emma Navarro (United States) Ben Shelton	10
(Spain) Paula Badosa (Greece) Stefanos Tsitsipas	8

== 2025: Indian Wells ==
=== Mixed doubles ===
The 2025 tournament was organized as the short formats' third mixed doubles tournament and was played on 4 March 2025 at the Indian Wells Tennis Garden for a fourth consecutive year, ahead of the 2025 Indian Wells Open. Amanda Anisimova and Daniil Medvedev replaced Paula Badosa and Stefanos Tsitsipas prior to the event.

The eight-team field included:

1. (United States) Emma Navarro / (United States) Ben Shelton (semifinals)
2. (Kazakhstan) Elena Rybakina / (United States) Taylor Fritz (champions)
3. (United States) Madison Keys / (United States) Tommy Paul (final)
4. (United States) Amanda Anisimova / Daniil Medvedev (quarterfinals)
5. (United Kingdom) Katie Boulter / (Australia) Alex de Minaur (quarterfinals)
6. (Greece) Maria Sakkari / (Norway) Casper Ruud (quarterfinals)
7. (Poland) Iga Świątek / (Poland) Hubert Hurkacz (semifinals)
8. (Italy) Jasmine Paolini / (Italy) Lorenzo Musetti (quarterfinals)

Quarterfinals
(Poland) Iga Świątek (Poland) Hubert Hurkacz	10
(Italy) Jasmine Paolini (Italy) Lorenzo Musetti	6
(United States) Madison Keys (United States) Tommy Paul	10
(Greece) Maria Sakkari (Norway) Casper Ruud	6
(United States) Amanda Anisimova; Daniil Medvedev	4
(Kazakhstan) Elena Rybakina (United States) Taylor Fritz	10
(United States) Emma Navarro (United States) Ben Shelton	10
(United Kingdom) Katie Boulter (Australia) Alex de Minaur	7

Semifinals
(Poland) Iga Świątek (Poland) Hubert Hurkacz	8
(United States) Madison Keys (United States) Tommy Paul	10
(Kazakhstan) Elena Rybakina (United States) Taylor Fritz	10
(United States) Emma Navarro (United States) Ben Shelton	6

Final
(United States) Madison Keys (United States) Tommy Paul	4
(Kazakhstan) Elena Rybakina (United States) Taylor Fritz	10

== 2026: Indian Wells ==
=== Mixed doubles ===
The 2026 tournament was organized as the short formats' fourth mixed doubles tournament and was played on 3 March 2026 at the Indian Wells Tennis Garden for a fifth consecutive year, ahead of the 2026 Indian Wells Open. The eight-team field included:

1. (Italy) Jasmine Paolini / (Italy) Matteo Berrettini (quarterfinals)
2. (Canada) Leylah Fernandez / (Canada) Felix Auger Aliassime (quarterfinals)
3. (United States) Jessica Pegula / (United States) Tommy Paul (quarterfinals)
4. (United States) Emma Navarro / (United States) Ben Shelton (quarterfinals)
5. (United States) Amanda Anisimova / (United States) Learner Tien (final)
6. Mirra Andreeva/ (Kazakhstan) Alexander Bublik (semifinals)
7. (Poland) Iga Świątek/ (Norway) Casper Ruud(semifinals)
8. (Kazakhstan) Elena Rybakina / (United States) Taylor Fritz (champions)

Quarterfinals
(United States) Emma Navarro (United States) Ben Shelton	3
(United States) Amanda Anisimova (United States) Learner Tien	10
(United States) Jessica Pegula (United States) Tommy Paul	9
Mirra Andreeva (Kazakhstan) Alexander Bublik	11
(Poland) Iga Świątek (Norway) Casper Ruud	10
(Canada) Leylah Fernandez (Canada) Felix Auger Aliassime	6
(Kazakhstan) Elena Rybakina (United States) Taylor Fritz	10
(Italy) Jasmine Paolini (Italy) Matteo Berrettini	5

Semifinals
(United States) Amanda Anisimova (United States) Learner Tien	10
Mirra Andreeva (Kazakhstan) Alexander Bublik	3
(Poland) Iga Świątek (Norway) Casper Ruud	3
(Kazakhstan) Elena Rybakina (United States) Taylor Fritz	10

Final
(United States) Amanda Anisimova (United States) Learner Tien	7
(Kazakhstan) Elena Rybakina (United States) Taylor Fritz	10

== Media coverage ==
Each Tie Break Tens tournament is broadcast live around the world. Some of the broadcast partners have included: Sky Sports, Dubai Sports, Canal+, DAZN, Facebook Live, CNN Open Court, presented by Pat Cash, SuperSport, Teledeporte TVE, BeIN Sports, Dave ESPN 2 and ESPN 3, and Tennis Channel.

== Sponsors ==
Past and current sponsors of the tournament include Voss Water, Betway, Tennis.com, Mutua, Rolex, Mercedes, Estrella, Wilson, TransferMate, FILA and Masimo, SlingerBag

== See also ==
- Ultimate Tennis Showdown
- Glossary of tennis terms
