= Midpoint (company) =

Canadian financial services company

Midpoint Holdings Ltd
- Company type: Public limited company
- Traded as: TSX-V: MPT
- Industry: Financial services
- Founded: April 15, 2010
- Headquarters: UK, Canada
- Key people: David Wong (CEO), John D'Agostino, Mike Hampson, Corbin Comishin, Dan Drogman, Ron S. Geffner
- Products: Foreign exchange, Bureau de change, E-commerce, Electronic funds transfer
- Website: www.midpoint.com

Midpoint (Midpoint Holdings Ltd) is a UK headquartered, Toronto and Frankfurt listed company providing international payments and peer-to-peer foreign exchange (bureau de change) services to individual and corporate customers. Midpoint is the world’s first dedicated peer-to-peer international foreign currency matching platform. The company's patented matching technology was the first application of peer-to-peer concept in the spot forex market.

== Operations ==
Midpoint's peer-to-peer engine directly matches businesses and individuals with offsetting currency requirements resulting in the elimination of the ‘spread or margin’ component from all transactions. By doing so, users avoid the cost of the bid–ask spread levied by traditional banks and brokers – often from 2%-5% and instead uses the midpoint of the real-time interbank market rate. For its services, the company charges a single flat fee depending on the amount of the transaction. The foreign exchange rate is set at the time the currency match is made, and the rate used is always the midpoint of the prevailing Interbank rate. The technology eliminates the spread imposed by market makers and the need for a middleman or broker. This mechanism help prevents discrimination against smaller sized transactions as all users receive the same midpoint interbank rate at the point of transaction. Despite its nomenclature, peer-to-peer foreign currency exchange should not be confused with P2P cryptocurrencies, digital or alternative 'currencies' such as bitcoin that rely on decentralised public ledgers and blockchain cryptography as a medium of exchange.

== History ==
The application of the peer-to-peer concept in foreign currency exchange began in 1999 when Mark Van Roon applied for a US patent for a "Computer Based Matching System for Party and Counterparty Exchange". Whilst the concept of peer-to-peer transactions was not in itself novel, its application in forex transactions resulting in a multi-currency netting process that satisfy offsetting currency needs was revolutionary as it promoted fair and transparent access to foreign exchange by reducing inefficiency and 'bank spreads'. This system forms the basis of Midpoint Holdings Ltd’s peer-to-peer currency exchange service. Other companies that provide a similar service, include: CurrencyFair, an Australian-based company, launched in April 2010; TransferWise which began operating in 2011; Kantox also established in 2011; and PeerFX launched in 2010.

== Technology ==
Midpoint's patented engine matches currency pair orders on a reciprocal basis by harnessing the peer-to-peer capabilities of the internet. In simpler terms, if User A in the UK wishes to purchase US dollars for pounds and User B in the USA wishes to purchase pounds for dollars, both orders are matched at the midpoint of the prevailing interbank exchange rate. The same principle applies to more sophisticated environment where more than a single party and counter-party pair are involved. For a 3-way group or even higher orders, consider an example where User X wishes to purchase US dollars for pounds, User Y wishes to purchase pounds for Swiss francs, and User Z wishes to purchase Swiss francs for dollars, Midpoint's patented technology performs multilateral netting for all three trades at the prevailing interbank market midpoint rates eliminating the need for a FX broker.

As the matching engine relies on matching orders via the internet, Midpoint's technology eliminates counterparty risks for its users as funds are held at segregated trust accounts. The company is authorised and regulated by the UK Financial Conduct Authority as a payments institution.

== Recent Developments ==
In May 2014, Midpoint announced the addition of three new currencies - Danish krone, Norwegian krone and Swedish krona to its peer-to-peer matching system. Six months later, the company added the United Arab Emirates dirham, Hong Kong dollar, and Polish złoty. In January 2015, the company was cross-listed on began trading on the Frankfurt Stock Exchange under the trading symbol '8MH'. The company announced an oversubscribed $620,000 private placement that closed in January 2015. In April 2015, Midpoint added Japanese Yen, Singapore dollar, Thai Baht and Turkish Lira to its peer-to-peer exchange platform. The launch of these four new currencies brings the total number of currencies offered to 23.

== See also ==
- CurrencyFair
- Moneycorp
- Sharing economy
- TransferWise
- Travelex
