= Torre Mapfre =

Skyscraper in the Port Olímpic

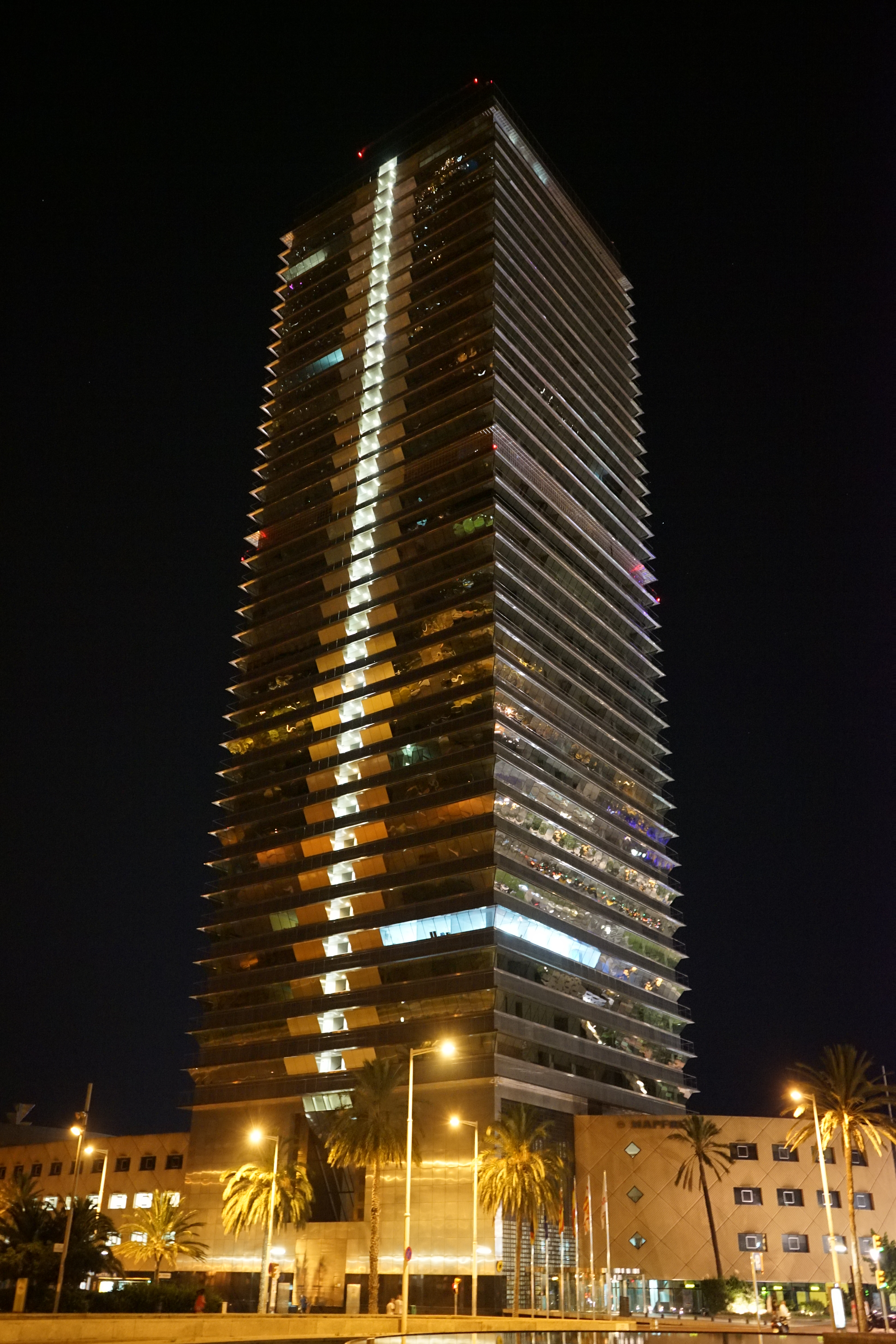
- Torre Mapfre by night
- Interactive map of the Torre Mapfre area

General information
- Status: Completed
- Type: Office
- Location: Carrer de la Marina, 18 Barcelona, Spain
- Coordinates: 41°23′16″N 2°11′51″E
- Construction started: 1991
- Completed: 1992
- Owner: Mapfre

Height
- Roof: 154 m (505 ft)

Technical details
- Floor count: 44
- Floor area: 44,555 m^{2} (479,590 sq ft)

Design and construction
- Architect: Iñigo Ortiz y Enrique de León

Torre Mapfre is a skyscraper in the Port Olímpic (Olympic Port), the maritime neighborhood of the Old City of Barcelona in Spain. It is named after its owner, Mapfre, an insurance company.

Also present in the tower are: Haufe Group, Kantox, ExoClick, Dorlet, Europerfil, Madrid Leasing (CAJA MADRID), Condal Grues, URSSA (Mondragón Corporation), Flex Multimedia Advertising SL (Flex Multimedia Group LTD), Kofax, Oriol Bohigues, Necso, Uniland Cementera S.A, Cementos Portland Valderrivas, Zardoya Otis, Texsa S.A, Oliver Wyman, Criteo.

This tower holds the title for highest helipad in Spain at 154 m (505 ft) above ground. Unlike its twin, Hotel Arts, this tower is a mixed use tower.

== See also ==
- List of skyscrapers in Spain
- Torre Agbar, third-tallest building in Barcelona
