= CurrencyFair =

Currency exchange platform

- Founded: 2009
- Headquarters: Dublin, Ireland
- No. of locations: Dublin, Ireland : Newcastle, Australia : Singapore : Hong Kong
- Area served: Australia, Canada, Europe, New Zealand.
- Founders: Brett Meyers, Jonathan Potter, Sean Barrett and David Christian
- President: Jan Lorenc
- Services: Financial Services
- Employees: 80+ (Sep 2020)
- Website: currencyfair.com
- Launched: 2009; 17 years ago

CurrencyFair is an online currency exchange platform that specialises in high value transfers. CurrencyFair is headquartered in Ireland and also has employees in the UK, Australia, Greece, Hong Kong, Poland and Singapore.

== History ==
CurrencyFair was established in April 2009 by co-founders Brett Meyers, Jonathan Potter, Sean Barrett, and David Christian. It was described by The Guardian as a marketplace where money is never exchanged across borders, rather staying in the country of origin, thereby avoiding bank conversion fees. Customers would have one currency but need funds in another. They would be "matched" with someone with a corresponding need—someone who has that currency but needs the other. This service is no longer offered.

The company was officially "launched" in December 2013 by then Irish Taoiseach Enda Kenny. At the time, 30 new jobs were announced.

In early 2014 CurrencyFair became the first platform in the world to break the $1 billion (€916 million) barrier in money-matching transfers, and in April 2017 CurrencyFair revamped their platform to enable SMEs to use the service.

CurrencyFair announced at the Web Summit in Lisbon in 2016 that it had raised €8 million in funding. A mobile app was launched in September 2015.

As of August 2017, the company announced it had traded over €5 billion. By July 2018, this had reputedly increased to over €7 billion.

In August 2018, the company announced a €20 million investment plan into the Asian market and the acquisition of Hong Kong-based Convoy Payments.

In October 2019, CurrencyFair announced its sponsorship of the 2019 Asian Gaelic Games, with a launch event in Croke Park.

In December 2019, the company completed a partnership agreement with Chinese online trade network Buy-World to launch its marketplace payment product. In April 2021, CurrencyFair agreed to merge with the Melbourne-based payments company Assembly Payments following a strategic investment from Standard Chartered; at the time CurrencyFair had about 90 employees and more than 150,000 customers. The merger was completed in November 2021, and the combined company took the name Zai, with CurrencyFair's chief executive Paul Byrne as its CEO. In April 2022, CurrencyFair, by then a sister brand of Zai. In April 2024, the Business Post reported that CurrencyFair's most recent accounts disclosed an alleged external fraud and that the company "could be forced" to cease payments for a year.

In July 2025, CurrencyFair moved its headquarters to the old central plaza.

== See also ==
- MoneyGram
- Ria Financial Services
- Transfast
- Western Union
- Wise (company)
- TransferMate
