= Kantox =

Multinational financial technology company

Kantox Ltd
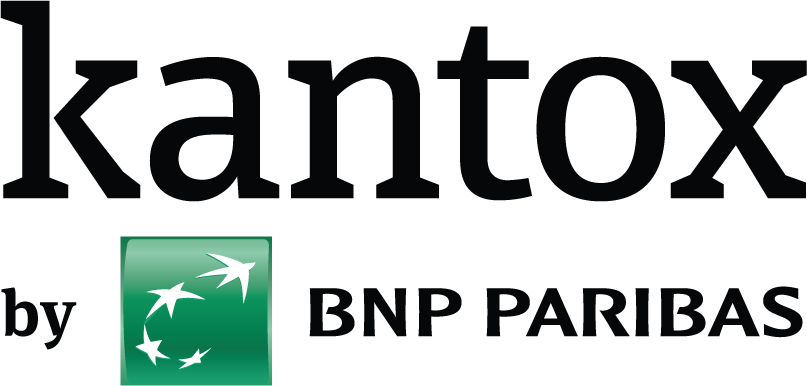
- Type: Subsidiary
- Industry: Financial services
- Founded: 2011; 15 years ago
- Founders: Philippe Gelis; Antonio Rami
- Headquarters: London, United Kingdom
- Key people: Philippe Gelis (CEO)
- Products: Foreign currency exchange
- Parent: BNP Paribas
- Website: kantox.com

Kantox Ltd is a multinational fintech company that offers Currency Management Automation software for corporate clients. Their software automates the pre-trade, trade, and post-trade stages of the corporate foreign exchange (FX) workflow.

Kantox has its headquarters in the City of London and offices in the Torre Mapfre in Barcelona, Spain. Their solution has foreign exchange capabilities in 124 currencies and operates in more than 70 countries worldwide.

They are a founding member of France Fintech, the Spanish Association for Financial Technology (Asociación Española de Technología Financiera) and the European Fintech Association, which all lobby for a greater role of FinTech in their respective countries' financial sectors.

== History ==
Kantox was founded in 2011 by former Deloitte consultants Philippe Gelis and Antonio Rami, alongside John Carbajal. The company's name is inspired by the surname of Georg Cantor, who developed the theory of transfinite numbers in the late nineteenth century.

Operating in the foreign exchange market, where daily turnover was estimated by the Bank for International Settlements at $6.6 trillion, Kantox raised €6.4 million in a Series A funding round in 2014.

Since then, Kantox has increased its total funding to over €30 million following two venture rounds from BNP Paribas and Eurazeo in July 2021. Kantox's platform reached $1 billion in total corporate foreign exchange transactions by 2015 and $18 billion by 2022.

In October 2022, BNP Paribas signed an agreement for the acquisition of Kantox for about €120 million. The acquisition was completed in July 2023.

== Recognition ==
In 2015, Kantox was named European FinTech of the Year at the European ICT Spring Awards. Kantox was also listed on the Deloitte Technology Fast 50 UK in 2017 and 2018, and the Deloitte Technology Fast 500 EMEA in 2016, 2017, and 2018.

Kantox’s Dynamic Hedging product won Treasury Management International’s award for Best Risk Management Solution in 2018, 2020, and 2022, as well as Best Solution Innovation in 2019 in collaboration with BNP Paribas. It was also named Best e-FX platform for corporates at the 2019 FX Week e-FX Awards.

The company has also been covered by international finance publications including Euromoney, Financial Times, The Wall Street Journal, and Forbes.

== Investors ==
Kantox has received financing through several investment rounds. Its investors include venture capital firms Partech Ventures, Eurazeo, and Cabiedes Partners, as well as private financiers and web entrepreneurs. In July 2021, Kantox raised €2 million from BNP Paribas and Eurazeo.

== See also ==
- Midpoint (company)
