= Transfast =

- Industry: Financial services
- Founded: 1988
- Headquarters: New York
- Area served: New York, India, UAE, Nigeria, Philippines
- Website: www.transfast.com

Transfast is an international money transfer and cross-border payments company headquartered in New York, with additional offices in India (Kochi, Pune, Jalandhar, and Hoshiarpur), the UAE, Nigeria, and the Philippines. Transfast is owned by Mastercard.

== Overview ==
The company is a provider of multi-currency, cross-border payments services for consumers and businesses around the world. Remittances are processed through its wholly owned direct-to-bank network, and the company offers 200,000 cash payout points across 120 countries.

== History ==
The company was founded in 1988 as Trans-Fast and focused on money transfers from the U.S. to Latin America. In 2007, the company received a private-equity investment from Greenhill Capital Partners, LLC and changed its name to Transfast Remittance LLC.

In July 2019, Mastercard acquired Transfast.

Transfast shuttered their online money transfer service on February 14, 2020.

== Products ==
Transpay

Transpay is a B2B/B2P cross-border payments platform. The company's platform uses robust end-to-end technology to enable instant transfers across its global proprietary network. Customers include Google and Upwork.

Agent business

Transfast has 200,000 payment points worldwide, with agents representing the company around the globe. Customers can send money in person to be received in cash or directly into a bank account.

Transfast.com

The company offers customers the ability to send online, from a desktop, or from a mobile device.

In the first quarter of 2016, Transfast was listed by World Bank at the top of the World Remittance Prices database for providing the lowest-cost remittances to the Philippines, Nigeria, Egypt and Ghana.

== Coverage ==
Transfast's network covers 120 countries across the Americas, Asia, Africa and Europe, and the company holds licenses in more than 70 jurisdictions globally.

In Africa, Transfast operates in 23 nations; the company's bank network covers up to 90 percent of adult bank account holders in those nations. Transfast customers in U.S. and Canada can send online or via mobile to recipients’ bank accounts at nearly 600 banks or to 6,000 cash pick-up locations inside banks in Africa. Transfast is also connected to M-Pesa in Kenya and teamed up with three major Kenyan banks, allowing customers worldwide to make instant money transfers to the country.

Transfast has crossed the 45,000-location mark in India and almost four million customers globally.

== See also ==
- Contactless payment
