= Ministry of Posts and Telecommunications =

Ministry of Posts and Telecommunications may refer to:

- Ministry of Post and Telecommunications (Algeria)
- Federal Ministry of Post and Telecommunications, West Germany
- Ministry of Posts, Telecommunications and Information Technology, Bangladesh
- Ministry of Post and Telecommunications (China) (1949–1998)
- Ministry of Post and Telecommunications (East Germany)
- Ministry of Posts and Telecommunications (Japan) (1946–2001)
- Ministry of Posts and Telecommunications (Laos)
- Ministry of Post and Telecommunications (Myanmar)
- Ministry of Post and Telecommunications (North Korea)
- Ministry of Posts and Telecommunications (United Kingdom)

== See also ==
- List of ministries of communications
- List of postal entities
