= TransferMate =

Irish online money transfer service

- Website type: Private company
- Available in: Multilingual
- Headquarters: Kilkenny, {{{location_country}}}
- Area served: Globally
- CEO: Gary Conroy
- Services: B2B cross border payment solution
- Employees: 185 (2017)
- Parent: Clune Technology Group (formerly The Taxback Group)
- Website: www.transfermate.com
- Registration: Yes
- Launched: 2008; 18 years ago
- Current status: Active

TransferMate is an Irish business-to-business payment technology company which was founded in 2010. The company provides a service to make cross border transfers online, this allows them to receive funds locally and make payments locally with the intention to eliminate the need for intermediary banks and international transfer fees.

It is headquartered in Kilkenny, Ireland, and has other offices in San Francisco, New York and Sydney.

According to the company, as of 2017, over $11 billion had been transferred through TransferMate's Technology. TransferMate's network of payment transfer systems is licensed and regulated in all 50 US states, Canada, Australia, New Zealand and in Europe.

== History ==
TransferMate was launched in 2008 by Terry Clune and Barry Dowling, a company under the Clune Technology Group (formerly The Taxback Group), which includes 6 other sister companies. Starting in 2008, the company expanded to 185 employees by late 2017. As of 2019, TransferMate reportedly had approximately 200 employees.

Instead of using intermediary banks to make transfers, TransferMate set up their own accounts, with the intent to allow the company to transfer funds through their own banking network. According to the company, TransferMate is regulated in the US, Canada, Australia, New Zealand and Europe.

The company created a FinTech (financial technology) system to allow their customers to make cross border transfers online, this allows them to receive funds locally and make payments locally with the intention to eliminate the need for intermediary banks and international transfer fees. TransferMate's technology has been incorporated in to other financial systems such as QuickBooks, SAP Concur and Tradeshift.

In November 2017, Allied Irish Banks invested €30m in the organisation.

In July 2018, ING Bank invested €21m, valuing TransferMate at €350m. ING Bank is also a partner, introducing TransferMate payment solutions to ING corporate clients.

Further funding of $70 million, by a UK pension fund, was announced in May 2022. A spokesperson for the company said this additional funding would "allow us to accelerate our mission to drive innovation".
